= Central High School (Burlington, Illinois) =

Location
- 44W625 Plato Road; Burlington, Kane County, Illinois 60109; United States; 42.019057°N 88.483425°W

Information
- Type: Public High School
- Opened: 1957 (current building 1991)
- School district: Central Community Unit School District 301
- NCES District ID: 1707830
- Superintendent: Amy MacCrindle
- CEEB code: 140454
- NCES School ID: 170783000397
- Principal: Brett Bending
- Staff: 80.83 (on an FTE basis)
- Grades: 9–12
- Enrollment: 1,473 (2023-2024)
- Student to teacher ratio: 18.22
- Campus type: Rural
- Colors: Blue, White
- Athletics conference: Fox Valley Conference
- Mascot: Rockets
- Rival: Hampshire Whip-Purs
- Newspaper: The Rocket Review
- Website: central301.net/chs/

Central High School, is a public four-year high school located in Burlington, Illinois. It is part of Central Community Unit School District 301, which serves Elgin, Lily Lake, Plato Center, Udina, Hampshire, Pingree Grove, Sycamore, Maple Park, Campton Hills, Burlington and far western portions of St. Charles.

== Academics ==
In 2015, the average ACT score was 22.9. In 2021–22, Central High School students saw a six-year high in year-to-year growth in Mathematics by 11% on the SAT, according to the Illinois State Board of Education. The Class of 2020, widened the gap of percentage of students enrolling in college within 12 months in comparison to the Illinois state average from 15% to 18%, according to the Illinois State Board of Education. 82% of Central High School students enrolled in college within 12 months, compared to the rest of Illinois (64%).

Overall, Central 301 has consistently received an “A" rating from Niche as one of the Top 25 unit school districts in Illinois. A majority of the district schools are ranked among the top 10 percent, according to the Illinois State Board of Education.

== Athletics ==
Central High School is a member of the Fox Valley Conference and offers more than 24 sports.

== "We Are Central" ==
Central 301 was founded in 1948 in the era of consolidation. Leaders at that time chose the name because it was a central location between Burlington High School and Plato Center High School in rural Kane County. As the two districts (along with Lily Lake) worked through the process of consolidation, a new junior / senior high school was constructed along Plato Road and opened to Grades 7–12 in 1957.

The building went through several rounds of expansion. It also experienced a devastating fire that destroyed the gym and cafeteria in January 1986. In the coming years as growth continued in the area, voters approved a referendum to construct a new high school adjacent to the building. The current high school opened on "Rocket Hill" in 1991, while the original high school is now Central Middle School.

The name "Burlington" has never been a part of the formal name for either the district or the high school. Students from Elgin, South Elgin, Campton Hills and Pingree Grove encompass an overwhelming majority of the 1,400 students at Central High School. The district uses the "We Are Central" motto as a way to engage students from nearly a dozen communities in Kane County.
