= Central Community Unit School District 301 =

School district in Illinois, United States

Address
- 275 South Street Burlington, Illinois, 60109; United States

District information
- Type: Public
- Grades: PreK–12
- NCES District ID: 1707830

Students and staff
- Students: 4,638

Other information
- Website: www.central301.net

Central Community Unit School District 301 is a school district located mainly in Kane County, Illinois. It serves Burlington, Lily Lake, and portions of Elgin, Campton Hills, St. Charles and Pingree Grove, as well as several unincorporated areas such as Bowes, North Plato, Plato Center, and Udina. In 2013, the district served 4,638 students across seven (7) schools. In 2023, the number of students was approaching 5,000.

Two (2) Central 301 schools are “Exemplary” while five (5) others were considered to be “Commendable” in the latest 2023 ISBE Report Card from the Illinois State Board of Education. Per ISBE, “Exemplary” schools perform in the top 10% of schools statewide with no underperforming student groups; while “Commendable” schools have no underperforming student groups and a graduation rate greater than 67%, with a performance that is not in the top 10% of schools statewide.

== Schools ==
- Central High School
- Central Middle School (8th Grade)
- Prairie Knolls Middle School (6th / 7th Grade)
- Country Trails Elementary School
- Howard B. Thomas Grade School
- Lily Lake Grade School
- Prairie View Grade School
