= Burlington, Illinois =

Burlington
- Village
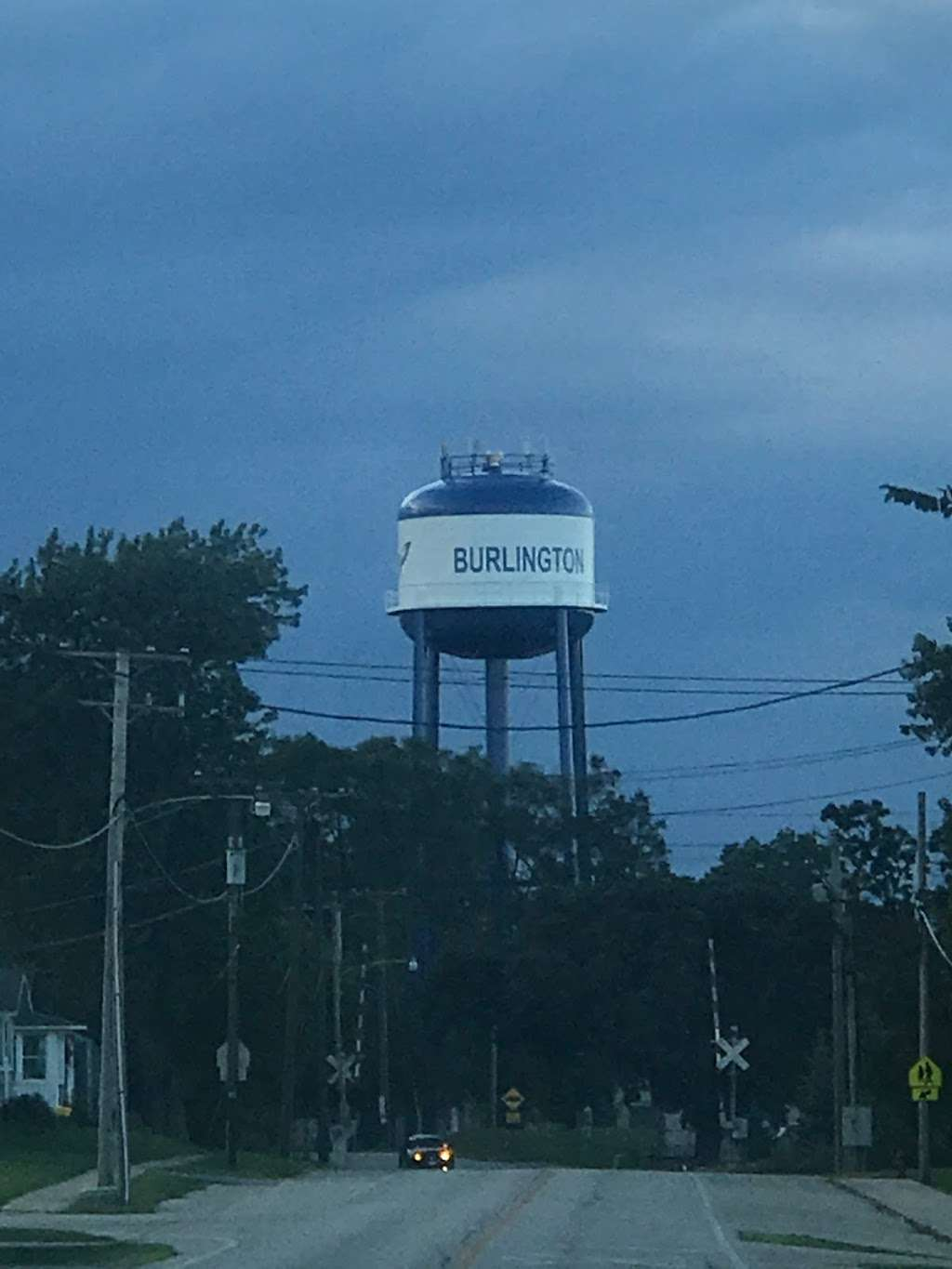
- Water Tower in Burlington

- Location of Burlington in Kane County, Illinois.

- Location of Illinois in the United States
- Coordinates: 42°03′05″N 88°33′02″W
- Country: United States
- State: Illinois
- County: Kane
- Township: Burlington
- Founded: 1906
- Incorporated: July 16, 1906

Government
  - Village President: Mary Kay Wlezen

Area
  - Total: 6.86 sq mi (17.76 km^{2})
  - Land: 6.85 sq mi (17.75 km^{2})
  - Water: 0 sq mi (0.00 km^{2})
- Elevation: 935 ft (285 m)

Population (2022)
  - Total: 429
  - Density: 419.923/sq mi (162.1333/km^{2})
- Time zone: UTC-6 (CST)
  - Summer (DST): UTC-5 (CDT)
- ZIP code: 60109
- Area code(s): 847, 224
- FIPS code: 17-09759
- GNIS feature ID: 2397500
- Wikimedia Commons: Burlington, Illinois
- Website: www.vil.burlington.il.us

Burlington is a village in Kane County, Illinois, United States. The population was 429 as of 2022 estimates. It was incorporated as a village on November 6, 1990.

== History ==
Burlington was platted by Andrew Pingree in 1851. It is located on the former Illinois Central Railroad which runs through the south edge of the village. A post office under the name "Burlington" has been in operation since 1865. In 1878, the area had three cheese factories, a general store, a hotel and a saloon. The last dairy plant closed in the 1970s.

Since the early 1990s, Burlington has been home to two small plastics companies. Concerns have been raised over the environmental impact these plants will have on the town and surrounding areas in the future. On November 6, 1990, Burlington was incorporated as a village, along with nearby Lily Lake and Virgil, in an effort to establish stricter guidelines regarding plastic manufacturing and chemical dumping in the area.

From 1910 to 2019, Burlington held an annual fall festival on the first week of September every year.

== Geography ==
Burlington is located near the intersection of Plank Road and Burlington Road. The village consists of a small "downtown" section, and is surrounded mostly by horse ranches and cornfields. It lies approximately halfway between Elgin and Sycamore, and is 20 miles north of the City of Aurora.

According to the 2022 American Community Survey, Burlington has a total area of 6.9 square miles (17.87 km^{2}), all land.

== Demographics ==
Historical population
Census	Pop.	Note	%±
1910	282		—
1920	209		−25.9%
1930	224		7.2%
1940	235		4.9%
1950	263		11.9%
1960	360		36.9%
1970	456		26.7%
1980	442		−3.1%
1990	400		−9.5%
2000	452		13.0%
2010	618		36.7%
2020	535		−13.4%
U.S. Decennial Census

Burlington village, Illinois – Racial and ethnic composition Note: the US Census treats Hispanic/Latino as an ethnic category. This table excludes Latinos from the racial categories and assigns them to a separate category. Hispanics/Latinos may be of any race.
Race / Ethnicity (NH = Non-Hispanic)	Pop 2010	Pop 2020	% 2010	% 2020
White alone (NH)	586	460	94.82%	85.98%
Black or African American alone (NH)	0	1	0.00%	0.19%
Native American or Alaska Native alone (NH)	0	0	0.00%	0.00%
Asian alone (NH)	5	1	0.81%	0.19%
Native Hawaiian or Pacific Islander alone (NH)	0	0	0.00%	0.00%
Other race alone (NH)	0	1	0.00%	0.19%
Mixed race or Multiracial (NH)	0	23	0.00%	4.30%
Hispanic or Latino (any race)	27	49	4.37%	9.16%
Total	618	535	100.00%	100.00%

As of the 2022 American Community Survey, there were 429 people residing in the village. There were 185 households, with an average of 2.3 persons per household; the majority of households (57%) include a married couple. The population density was 62.6 inhabitants per square mile (24.2/km^{2}). There were 203 housing units, 91% of which were occupied. The median value of (owner-occupied) housing units was $275,000.

The majority of the population (85.6%, or 367 people) self-identified as white. About 2.3% (10 people) identified as two or more races, and 12.1% (52 people) identified as Hispanic; no one selected other racial categories.

In the village, the median age was 37.3: 26.3% of residents (113) were under 18, and 17.7% (76) aged 65 or over. The population was 52.2% female (224 people) compared to 47.8% male (205 people).

Burlington also has many veterans, compared to the rate in Illinois more broadly: 11.1% of Burlington's population has served, compared to 5.2% in Illinois as a whole. The majority of Burlington's veterans served in the Gulf Wars (1990s and/or 2001-).

The median income for a household in the village was $79,531. The per capita income for the village was $39,489. About 9.8% of individuals were below the poverty line, including 10.6% of those under age 18 and 5.3% of those age 65 or over.

== Schools ==
Burlington is home to Central High School, Central Middle School, and Howard B. Thomas Grade School, all of which serve Central Community Unit School District 301.
