= Elgin Professional Building =

High-rise building in Elgin, Illinois

Coordinates: 42°02′20″N 88°17′00″W

The Elgin Professional Building is a historic high-rise building constructed in 1928 at 164 Division Street in downtown Elgin, Illinois. The building is 8 stories, at 96 feet tall, and functions primarily as an office building, housing the Elgin Art Showcase on the top floor since 2007. The building is also the office of Illinois State Senator Cristina Castro, and Illinois State Representative Anna Moeller. Built in the Gothic Revival style, it and the Elgin Tower Building have been centerpieces in the skyline of downtown Elgin for many years.

== History ==
In the early 20th century, Elgin was experiencing a vibrant economy and massive population growth. The Elgin National Watch Company was the largest domestic watch producer, and employed many. The Elgin Sweeper Company was an early pioneer of street sweepers, and the city had a booming dairy industry. All this business attracted the attention of the Professional Building Corporation, which decided Elgin needed a new office building. The building was constructed in the Gothic Revival style, and was the tallest building in the city, not to mention the most glamorous. It featured a soaring two story Gothic lobby, and an 8th floor ballroom which had commanding views of the city and a must go for socialites in the city. Unfortunately, like much of the country, Elgin was ravaged by the Great Depression, and the Professional Building lost many a tenant. However, it continued on as normal and today houses a variety of services, from medical professionals to law offices.

=== Renovations ===
In 2003, renovations were considered in a city-wide attempt to revitalize the downtown. It was proposed that an investment company would convert the offices into residential units, and the top floor ballroom into a restaurant, but this never occurred, and the building is still composed of offices.
