= Campton Town Hall =

Historic building in Illinois, United States

- U.S. National Register of Historic Places
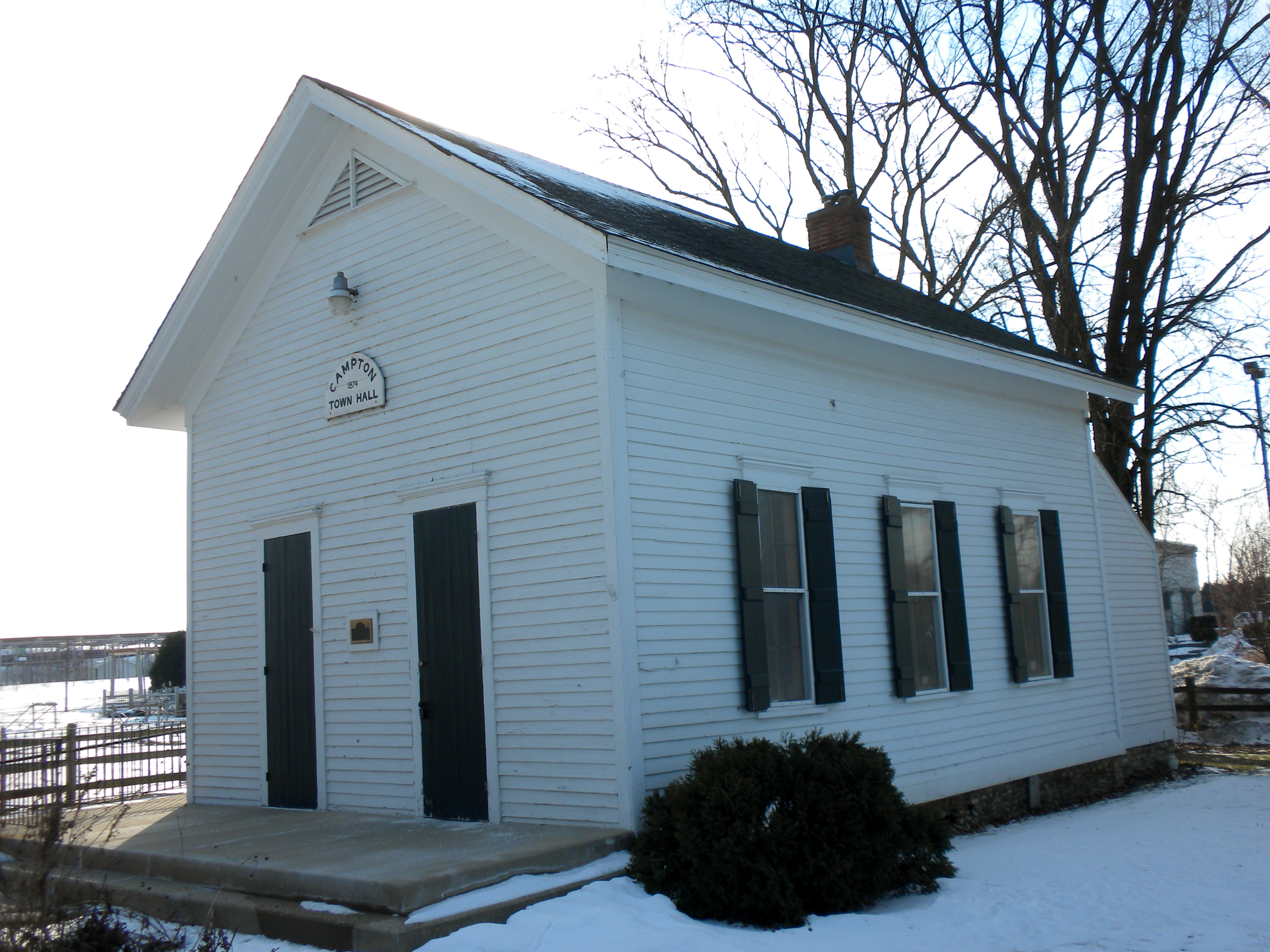
- Campton Town Hall in 2010

- Location within Illinois Location within the United States
- Location: Wasco, Illinois
- Coordinates: 41°55′56″N 88°25′45″W
- Built: 1918
- Architect: Archie Moody
- NRHP reference No.: 80001378
- Added to NRHP: November 24, 1980

Campton Town Hall a historic building in Wasco, Illinois. It was listed on the National Register of Historic Places in 1980.

== History ==
The Campton Town Hall has been operating continuously since 1874, primarily as the administrative offices for Campton Township in Kane County, Illinois. Settlers first arrived in Campton Township in 1835 and originally held town meetings in the home of Ever Chafee. The meeting place later bounced between different schools before the local citizens decided to construct a township meeting hall in 1874. This was an unusual step, as most unincorporated, rural areas of the time only held meetings in schools. A parade was held for the structure in 1935 in honor of its service. In 1975, plans for a new town hall were drawn and the Campton Town Hall was in danger of demolition, primarily due to its lack of heating and sanitation. However, the locals were able raise enough money to install these facilities in the building, and the town hall continued to serve the community. On November 24, 1980, the U. S. Department of the Interior recognized the Campton Town Hall as a Historic Place.

== Architecture ==
The building is rectangular with a wood frame and riverstone foundation. The frame is covered in 6-inch (150 mm) clapboard painted white. Sets of three four-over-four windows are on the north and south. The east side of the hall is the entrance and faces Town Hall Street just south of Illinois Route 64. The pair of doors each have four panels and sit under individual transoms. Originally, the building had a wood platform on this exposure, but this was replaced with concrete steps around 1940. The original chimney was altered to a two-flue chimney to allow for a heating system. Louver vents were also installed on the east and west around this time. The original roof had cedar shingles, but these were replaced with grey asphalt shingles.

The interior has 15-foot (4.6 m) ceilings above pine flooring. wooden wainscotting is present up to 3 feet (0.91 m) above the floor and is painted glaucous. Doors and windows are trimmed with 2.5-inch (64 mm) wood moulding. There is a chimney on the west wall. A door was added on the west wall during restoration to allow access to the utility room.
