= Plato Township, Illinois =

Plato Township
- Township
- Location in Kane County

- Kane County's location in Illinois
- Coordinates: 42°01′34″N 88°25′52″W
- Country: United States
- State: Illinois
- County: Kane
- Established: November 6, 1849

Area
  - Total: 33.49 sq mi (86.7 km^{2})
  - Land: 33.49 sq mi (86.7 km^{2})
  - Water: 0 sq mi (0 km^{2}) 0%
- Elevation: 922 ft (281 m)

Population (2020)
  - Total: 9,296
  - Density: 277.6/sq mi (107.2/km^{2})
- Time zone: UTC-6 (CST)
  - Summer (DST): UTC-5 (CDT)
- ZIP codes: 60124, 60140, 60151, 60175
- FIPS code: 17-089-60365
- Website: www.platotwp.gov

Plato Township is one of sixteen townships in Kane County, Illinois, USA. As of the 2020 census, its population was 9,296 and it contained 3,298 housing units. It was originally named Homer Township; the name was changed to Plato on July 2, 1850.

== Geography ==
According to the 2021 census gazetteer files, Plato Township has a total area of 33.49 square miles (86.74 km^{2}), all land.

=== Cities, towns, villages ===
- Campton Hills (partial)
- Elgin (partial)
- Hampshire (partial)
- Pingree Grove (partial)

=== Unincorporated towns ===
- Bowes at 42.0080822°N 88.3909136°W
- Bowes Bend at 42.0108598°N 88.4148031°W
- Chippewa at 42.0214153°N 88.4150813°W
- Hidden Lakes at 42.0255819°N 88.4131369°W
- McQueen at 42.0619702°N 88.3848039°W
- North Plato at 42.0550257°N 88.4642502°W
- Plato Center at 42.0266929°N 88.4300818°W
- Plato Corners at 41.9869713°N 88.40508°W
- Silent Meadow at 42.0116932°N 88.4236923°W
- Tamara Heights at 42.0028044°N 88.4311922°W
- Udina (west half) at 42.043331°N 88.376114°W

(This list is based on USGS data and may include former settlements.)

=== Airports and landing strips ===
- Olson Airport

=== Cemeteries ===
The township contains these five cemeteries: Plato Center, L R Baker, North Plato, Udina and Washington Memorial.

=== Major highways ===
- U.S. Route 20
- Illinois Route 47

== Demographics ==
As of the 2020 census there were 9,296 people, 1,981 households, and 1,644 families residing in the township. The population density was 277.62 inhabitants per square mile (107.19/km^{2}). There were 3,298 housing units at an average density of 98.49 per square mile (38.03/km^{2}). The racial makeup of the township was 76.05% White, 2.25% African American, 0.34% Native American, 9.34% Asian, 0.01% Pacific Islander, 3.22% from other races, and 8.79% from two or more races. Hispanic or Latino of any race were 10.59% of the population.

There were 1,981 households, out of which 34.10% had children under the age of 18 living with them, 69.91% were married couples living together, 11.61% had a female householder with no spouse present, and 17.01% were non-families. 12.60% of all households were made up of individuals, and 2.40% had someone living alone who was 65 years of age or older. The average household size was 3.17 and the average family size was 3.52.

The township's age distribution consisted of 25.0% under the age of 18, 10.6% from 18 to 24, 20.9% from 25 to 44, 28.6% from 45 to 64, and 14.8% who were 65 years of age or older. The median age was 38.6 years. For every 100 females, there were 100.4 males. For every 100 females age 18 and over, there were 92.3 males.

The median income for a household in the township was $137,572, and the median income for a family was $165,962. Males had a median income of $72,260 versus $49,544 for females. The per capita income for the township was $65,893. About 1.6% of families and 1.5% of the population were below the poverty line, including 0.0% of those under age 18 and 0.0% of those age 65 or over.

Historical population
Census	Pop.	Note	%±
2000	4,018		—
2010	6,166		53.5%
2020	9,296		50.8%
U.S. Decennial Census

== School districts ==
- Central Community Unit School District 301
- Community Unit School District 300
- School District U-46
- St. Charles Community Unit School District 303

== Political districts ==
- Illinois's 14th congressional district
- State House District 49
- State Senate District 25
