= Almora (disambiguation) =

Almora is a city in India.

Almora may also refer to:

- Almora district, a district in India
- Almora (Lok Sabha constituency)
- Almora (band), a Turkish band
- Almora, Illinois, a community in the United States
- Almorah (1817), a ship
- Albert Almora, American baseball player
