= Plasticity =

Plasticity may refer to:

== Science ==
- Plasticity (physics), in engineering and physics, the propensity of a solid material to undergo permanent deformation under load
- Behavioral plasticity, change in an organism's behavior in response to exposure to stimuli
- Neuroplasticity, in neuroscience, how entire brain structures, and the brain itself, can change as a result of experience
  - Synaptic plasticity, the property of a neuron or synapse to change its internal parameters in response to its history
  - Metaplasticity, the plasticity of synapses
- Phenotypic plasticity, in biology, describes the ability of an organism to change its phenotype in response to changes in the environment

== Art and entertainment ==
- Plastic arts, such as clay sculpture, in which material is formed or deformed into a new, permanent shape
- Plasticity, an album by Cabaret Voltaire
- Plasticity, a non-album single from Front Line Assembly released alongside Hard Wired
- "Plasticities", a song by Andrew Bird, from the album Armchair Apocrypha
- Plasticity (software) - 3D modeling program

== Events ==
- Plasticity Forum is a conference on the future of plastic and how to reduce impacts on the environment.

== See also ==
- Plastic (disambiguation)
- Neo-Plasticism
