= Burlington Township, Illinois =

Burlington Township
- Township
- Location in Kane County

- Kane County's location in Illinois
- Coordinates: 42°01′48″N 088°32′58″W
- Country: United States
- State: Illinois
- County: Kane

Area
  - Total: 33.78 sq mi (87.5 km^{2})
  - Land: 33.78 sq mi (87.5 km^{2})
  - Water: 0 sq mi (0 km^{2}) 0%
- Elevation: 920 ft (280 m)

Population (2020)
  - Total: 1,810
  - Density: 53.6/sq mi (20.7/km^{2})
- ZIP codes: 60109, 60140, 60151
- FIPS code: 17-089-09772
- GNIS feature ID: 0428737
- Website: www.burlingtontownship.net

Burlington Township is located in Kane County, Illinois. As of the 2020 census, its population was 1,810 and it contained 716 housing units. Most of its land use is agricultural.

== Geography ==
According to the 2021 census gazetteer files, Burlington Township has a total area of 33.78 square miles (87.49 km^{2}), all land.

=== Cities, towns, villages ===
- Burlington
- Hampshire (partial)
- Maple Park (partial)

The village of Burlington (pop. 535) is located near the center of the township, south of the intersection of Plank Road and Burlington Blacktop/Main Street. It is also known as "Burlington City".

== Demographics ==
Historical population
Census	Pop.	Note	%±
2000	1,767		—
2010	1,921		8.7%
2020	1,810		−5.8%
U.S. Decennial Census

As of the 2020 census there were 1,810 people, 642 households, and 522 families residing in the township. The population density was 53.58 inhabitants per square mile (20.69/km^{2}). There were 716 housing units at an average density of 21.20 per square mile (8.19/km^{2}). The racial makeup of the township was 86.80% White, 0.28% African American, 0.44% Native American, 0.28% Asian, 0.00% Pacific Islander, 5.86% from other races, and 6.35% from two or more races. Hispanic or Latino of any race were 12.93% of the population.

There were 642 households, out of which 24.90% had children under the age of 18 living with them, 72.74% were married couples living together, 2.34% had a female householder with no spouse present, and 18.69% were non-families. 16.80% of all households were made up of individuals, and 7.30% had someone living alone who was 65 years of age or older. The average household size was 2.90 and the average family size was 3.21.

The township's age distribution consisted of 17.7% under the age of 18, 12.9% from 18 to 24, 15.8% from 25 to 44, 36.6% from 45 to 64, and 17.0% who were 65 years of age or older. The median age was 48.0 years. For every 100 females, there were 100.8 males. For every 100 females age 18 and over, there were 100.3 males.

The median income for a household in the township was $108,421, and the median income for a family was $122,879. Males had a median income of $59,605 versus $25,588 for females. The per capita income for the township was $52,602. About 2.7% of families and 4.3% of the population were below the poverty line, including 4.2% of those under age 18 and 0.6% of those age 65 or over.
