= Plastique (disambiguation) =

Plastique is an obsolete term for plastic explosive.

Plastique may also refer to:

- Plastique (character), DC comic book character
  - Plastique (Arrowverse), a version of the character in the Arrowverse
  - "Plastique" (The Flash episode), an episode of The Flash
  - "Plastique" (Smallville), an episode of Smallville centered on another version of the character
- Plastique Tiara, Vietnamese-American drag queen

== See also ==
- Plastic (disambiguation)
