= Elgin Township, Illinois =

Elgin Township
- Township
- Flag Seal

- Location in Kane County

- Kane County's location in Illinois
- Coordinates: 42°01′33″N 088°19′14″W
- Country: United States
- State: Illinois
- County: Kane

Area
  - Total: 32.65 sq mi (84.6 km^{2})
  - Land: 31.92 sq mi (82.7 km^{2})
  - Water: 0.73 sq mi (1.9 km^{2}) 2.23%
- Elevation: 820 ft (250 m)

Population (2020)
  - Total: 104,493
  - Density: 3,274/sq mi (1,264/km^{2})
- FIPS code: 17-089-23087
- GNIS feature ID: 0428948

Elgin Township is located in Kane County, Illinois. It is divided by the Fox River. As of the 2020 census, its population was 104,493 and it contained 37,575 housing units.

== Geography ==
According to the 2021 census gazetteer files, Elgin Township has a total area of 32.65 square miles (84.56 km^{2}), of which 31.92 square miles (82.67 km^{2}) (or 97.77%) is land and 0.73 square miles (1.89 km^{2}) (or 2.23%) is water.

Most of the township is incorporated in the City of Elgin.

Township offices are located at 729 S. McLean Blvd Suite 200, Elgin, IL.

== Demographics ==
Elgin Township, Illinois – Racial and ethnic composition Note: the US Census treats Hispanic/Latino as an ethnic category. This table excludes Latinos from the racial categories and assigns them to a separate category. Hispanics/Latinos may be of any race.
Race / Ethnicity (NH = Non-Hispanic)	Pop 2000	Pop 2010	Pop 2020	% 2000	% 2010	% 2020
White alone (NH)	52,720	49,017	43,530	58.33%	48.57%	41.66%
Black or African American alone (NH)	5,392	6,573	6,296	5.97%	6.51%	6.03%
Native American or Alaska Native alone (NH)	119	145	143	0.13%	0.14%	0.14%
Asian alone (NH)	2,908	4,478	5,599	3.22%	4.44%	5.36%
Native Hawaiian or Pacific Islander alone (NH)	11	16	30	0.01%	0.02%	0.03%
Other race alone (NH)	68	99	374	0.08%	0.10%	0.36%
Mixed race or Multiracial (NH)	1,196	1,466	2,979	1.32%	1.45%	2.85%
Hispanic or Latino (any race)	27,970	39,128	45,542	30.95%	38.77%	43.58%
Total	90,384	100,922	104,493	100.00%	100.00%	100.00%

Historical population
Census	Pop.	Note	%±
2016 (est.)	59,278
U.S. Decennial Census

As of the 2020 census there were 104,493 people, 35,285 households, and 25,352 families residing in the township. The population density was 3,200.69 inhabitants per square mile (1,235.79/km^{2}). There were 37,575 housing units at an average density of 1,150.95 per square mile (444.38/km^{2}). The racial makeup of the township was 48.14% White, 6.36% African American, 2.14% Native American, 5.51% Asian, 0.07% Pacific Islander, 22.22% from other races, and 15.57% from two or more races. Hispanic or Latino of any race were 43.58% of the population.

There were 35,285 households, out of which 36.20% had children under the age of 18 living with them, 52.89% were married couples living together, 13.40% had a female householder with no spouse present, and 28.15% were non-families. 23.80% of all households were made up of individuals, and 9.70% had someone living alone who was 65 years of age or older. The average household size was 2.90 and the average family size was 3.44.

The township's age distribution consisted of 24.8% under the age of 18, 9.1% from 18 to 24, 26.8% from 25 to 44, 25.9% from 45 to 64, and 13.4% who were 65 years of age or older. The median age was 36.7 years. For every 100 females, there were 101.4 males. For every 100 females age 18 and over, there were 100.7 males.

The median income for a household in the township was $75,614, and the median income for a family was $84,291. Males had a median income of $41,919 versus $30,883 for females. The per capita income for the township was $30,748. About 8.7% of families and 10.6% of the population were below the poverty line, including 17.7% of those under age 18 and 6.2% of those age 65 or over.

Historical population
Census	Pop.	Note	%±
2000	90,384		—
2010	100,922		11.7%
2020	104,493		3.5%
U.S. Decennial Census

== Cities, towns, villages ==
- Bartlett (small portion)
- Elgin (vast majority)
- South Elgin (upper two thirds)

=== Other communities ===
- Almora at 42.060833°N 88.336113°W
- Youngsdale at 41.990582°N 88.340634°W
- Udina (east half) at 42.043331°N 88.376114°W
