= Elgin Downtown Commercial District =

- U.S. National Register of Historic Places
- U.S. Historic district
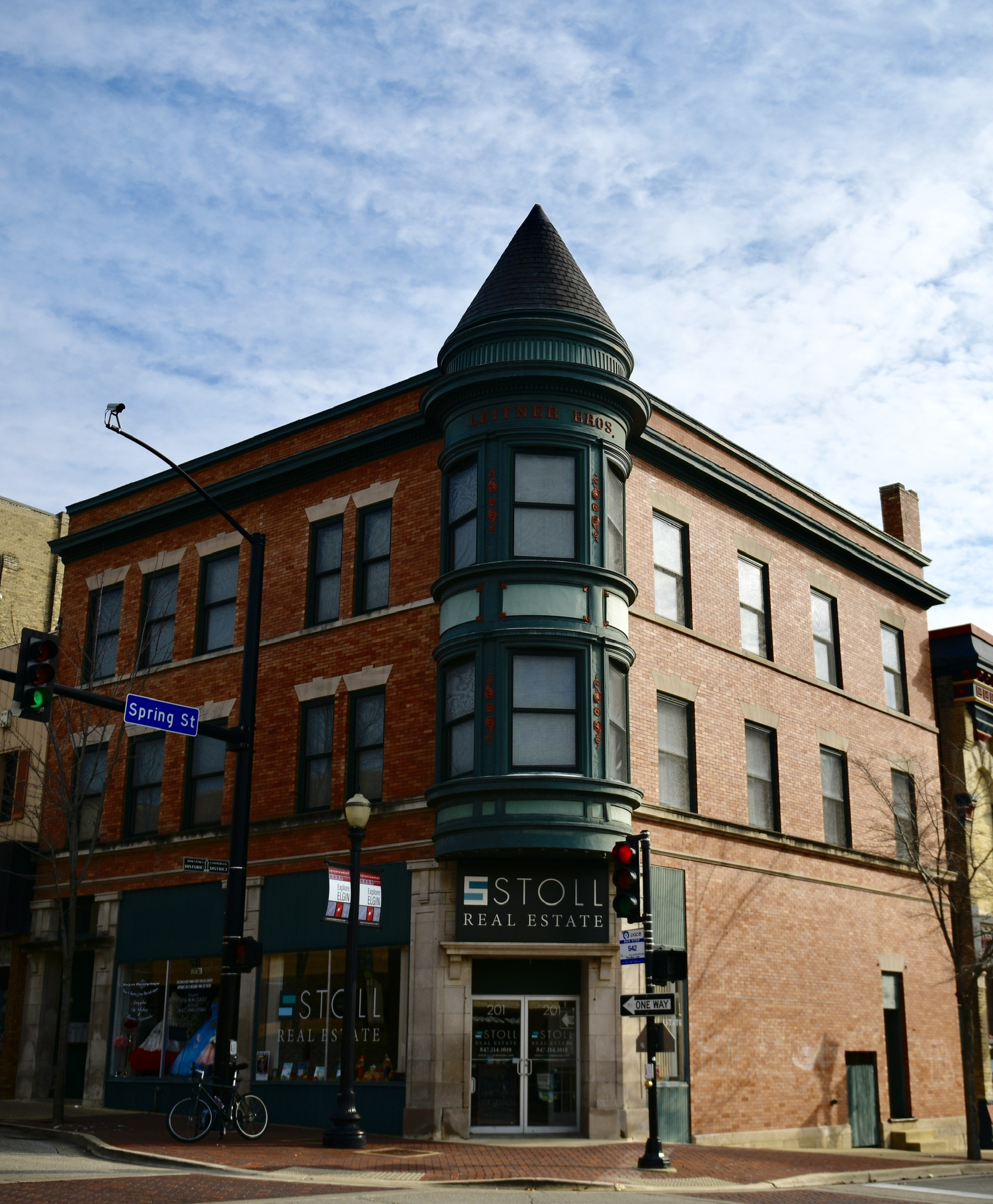
- Leitner Bros. Building. (c. 1875)

- Location within Illinois Location within the United States
- Location: Roughly bounded by Division, Villa, Center, Fulton & Grove., Elgin, Illinois
- Coordinates: 42°02′12″N 88°17′01″W
- NRHP reference No.: 14001067
- Added to NRHP: December 22, 2014

The Elgin Downtown Commercial District is a historic district encompassing the commercial core of downtown Elgin, Illinois. The district includes 94 buildings, 76 of which are considered contributing buildings to its historic character. While development in downtown Elgin began in the 1830s, the oldest buildings in the district were built in the 1870s; most of the district's buildings were built in the late 19th and early 20th centuries, but its development continued through the 20th century. The majority of the buildings in the district are two- and three-story commercial buildings, but it also includes several taller commercial buildings, churches, a public library, and a power station. Most of the 19th-century buildings in the district have Italianate or Queen Anne designs, while the 20th-century buildings features styles such as Colonial Revival and Renaissance Revival.

The district was added to the National Register of Historic Places on December 22, 2014.
