= The Plastics =

The Plastics may refer to

- Plastics, a Japanese technopop band
- The Plastics, name of a clique of schoolgirls in the film Mean Girls

== See also ==
- The Plastic People of the Universe, a rock back from the Czech Republic
- Plastic (disambiguation)
