= Wade Schaaf =

Wade Schaaf (born 1979) is an American contemporary dancer, choreographer and dance company artistic director.

== Biography ==
Wade Schaaf (they/them) was born in Elgin, Illinois on May 2, 1979. After graduating from Northern Illinois University with a BFA in Theater Arts (Dance Performance Emphasis) in 2001, Wade went on to dance for such companies as The Ohio Ballet, State Street Ballet, River North Chicago Dance Company and Thodos Dance Chicago.

Wade is the founder and Artistic Director of Chicago Repertory Ballet, the company that they founded on November 13, 2011. Wade has created works on such companies as The Omaha Theater Ballet, and Thodos Dance Chicago, Nomi Dance Company, Chicago Repertory Ballet, South Chicago Dance Theater and more.

== Performing ==
Schaaf started their performing career in Elgin, IL performing in various community and children's theater productions. At Northern Illinois University Wade performed in various ballets and contemporary choreographies such as The Sleeping Beauty, The Nutcracker, Paquita, and Giselle. After leaving the university setting, they performed extensively throughout the United States, Europe and Asia. During Wade's career, they performed works by such choreographers as Kennet Oberly, Lauri Stallings, Bill Soleau, Septime Webre, Stephen Mills, Frank Chavez, and Ann Reinking; Reinking created the role of Carter Harrison in the ballet, "The White City: Chicago's Colombian Exposition". Schaaf retired in 2011 due to injury.

== Choreography ==
Wade's choreography is known for its emotional sensitivity, musicality, and variety. Their choreography ranges from Full length narrative ballets, to abstract ballets to contemporary dance works of varied style and tone.

| Title | Company | Premiere date/Location |
|---|---|---|
| Scheonberg Piano Works | Omaha Theater Ballet | 2005 Omaha, NE |
| Somewhere in the Middle | Omaha Theater Ballet | 2006 Omaha, NE |
| The Gathering | Omaha Theater Ballet | 2007 Omaha, NE |
| Awakening | Thodos Dance Chicago | 2008, Ruth Page Center, Chicago, IL |
| Dancer, Net | Thodos Dance Chicago | 2009, Dance Center Columbia College, Chicago, IL |
| Shostakovich Piano Concerto | Thodos Dance Chicago | 2010, Ruth Page Center, Chicago, IL |
| Tres Hip: A Love Story | Dance in the Parks | 2010, Chicago Parks, Chicago, IL |
| La Vie en Rose | Chicago Repertory Ballet | 2012, Ruth Page Center, Chicago, IL |
| 2 Lent et Douloureux | Chicago Repertory Ballet | 2012, Ruth Page Center, Chicago, IL |
| Peoplescape: Juxtaposition | Chicago Repertory Ballet | 2012, Ruth Page Center, Chicago, IL |
| Le Sacre du Printemps (The Rite of Spring) | Chicago Repertory Ballet | 2013, The Vittum Theater, Chicago, IL |
| The Four Seasons | Chicago Repertory Ballet | 2014, The Biograph Theater, Chicago, IL |
| Wasteland | Chicago Repertory Ballet | 2015, The Biograph Theater, Chicago, IL |
| Bolero | Chicago Repertory Ballet | 2015, The Biograph Theater, Chicago, IL |
| Macbeth | Chicago Repertory Ballet | 2016, The Ruth Page Center, Chicago, IL |
| A Symphony for Hope | Chicago Repertory Ballet | 2017, The Biograph Theater, Chicago, IL |
| Duet: 1 | Chicago Repertory Ballet | 2017, The Biograph Theater, Chicago, IL |
| Illuminations Nos 1-3 | Nomi Dance Company | 2017, The Athenaeum Theater, Chicago, IL |
| Grand Pianola Music: On the Great Divide | Chicago Repertory Ballet | 2018, The Athenaeum Theater, Chicago, IL |
| Anderson Sweet | Chicago Repertory Ballet | 2021, Montrose Harbor, Chicago, IL |
| Le Sacre Du Printemps (Revived/Renewed) | Chicago Repertory Ballet | 2021, Montrose Harbor, Chicago, IL |
| Huit Suite | Chicago Repertory Ballet | 2021, Center on Halsted, Chicago, IL |

== Chicago Repertory Ballet ==
Chicago based contemporary ballet company founded by Wade Schaaf. The company, founded on November 13, 2011, is dedicated to bring storytelling and choreographic innovation to the stage while inspiring audiences and challenging preconceived notions of the art form. Chicago Repertory Ballet premiered at the Ruth Page Center for the Arts in 2012.
