= Campton Township, Illinois =

Campton Township
- Township
- Location in Kane County

- Kane County's location in Illinois
- Coordinates: 41°56′30″N 088°26′09″W
- Country: United States
- State: Illinois
- County: Kane

Area
  - Total: 34.48 sq mi (89.3 km^{2})
  - Land: 34.31 sq mi (88.9 km^{2})
  - Water: 0.17 sq mi (0.44 km^{2}) 0.48%
- Elevation: 889 ft (271 m)
- ZIP Codes: 60119, 60124, 60151, 60175, 60183
- FIPS code: 17-089-10903
- GNIS feature ID: 0428755

Campton Township is located in Kane County, Illinois. As of the 2020 census, its population was 17,064 and it contained 5,828 housing units.

The township's rural character is subject to increased development. Following an annexation by Elgin, Illinois of northern land for high density development, in May 2007 most of the unincorporated areas of the township became part of the new Village of Campton Hills.

== Geography ==
According to the 2021 census gazetteer files, Campton Township has a total area of 34.48 square miles (89.30 km^{2}), of which 34.31 square miles (88.86 km^{2}) (or 99.52%) is land and 0.17 square miles (0.44 km^{2}) (or 0.48%) is water.

=== Cities, Towns, Villages ===
- Campton Hills (vast majority)
- Elburn (partial)
- Elgin (partial)
- Lily Lake
- St. Charles (partial)

=== Unincorporated Towns ===
- Appaloosa West
- Wasco

== Demographics ==
As of the 2020 census there were 17,064 people, 5,888 households, and 4,956 families residing in the township. The population density was 494.95 inhabitants per square mile (191.10/km^{2}). There were 5,828 housing units at an average density of 169.05 per square mile (65.27/km^{2}). The racial makeup of the township was 88.71% White, 0.91% African American, 0.15% Native American, 2.31% Asian, 0.01% Pacific Islander, 1.19% from other races, and 6.72% from two or more races. Hispanic or Latino of any race were 5.61% of the population.

There were 5,888 households, out of which 40.70% had children under the age of 18 living with them, 76.19% were married couples living together, 4.62% had a female householder with no spouse present, and 15.83% were non-families. 13.10% of all households were made up of individuals, and 6.10% had someone living alone who was 65 years of age or older. The average household size was 2.94 and the average family size was 3.22.

The township's age distribution consisted of 26.3% under the age of 18, 8.1% from 18 to 24, 17.7% from 25 to 44, 32.7% from 45 to 64, and 15.3% who were 65 years of age or older. The median age was 43.4 years. For every 100 females, there were 98.7 males. For every 100 females age 18 and over, there were 98.8 males.

The median income for a household in the township was $146,604, and the median income for a family was $165,407. Males had a median income of $86,547 versus $36,313 for females. The per capita income for the township was $60,450. About 2.4% of families and 3.6% of the population were below the poverty line, including 3.4% of those under age 18 and 4.8% of those age 65 or over.

Historical population
Census	Pop.	Note	%±
2000	14,053		—
2010	17,174		22.2%
2020	17,064		−0.6%
2016 (est.)	17,564		2.3%
U.S. Decennial Census

== Trivia ==
- In the 1840s, the family of young Charles Ingalls moved from New York to the tallgrass prairie of Campton Township, just west of Elgin, Illinois.
