= Elgin Tower Building =

- U.S. National Register of Historic Places
- U.S. Historic district – Contributing property
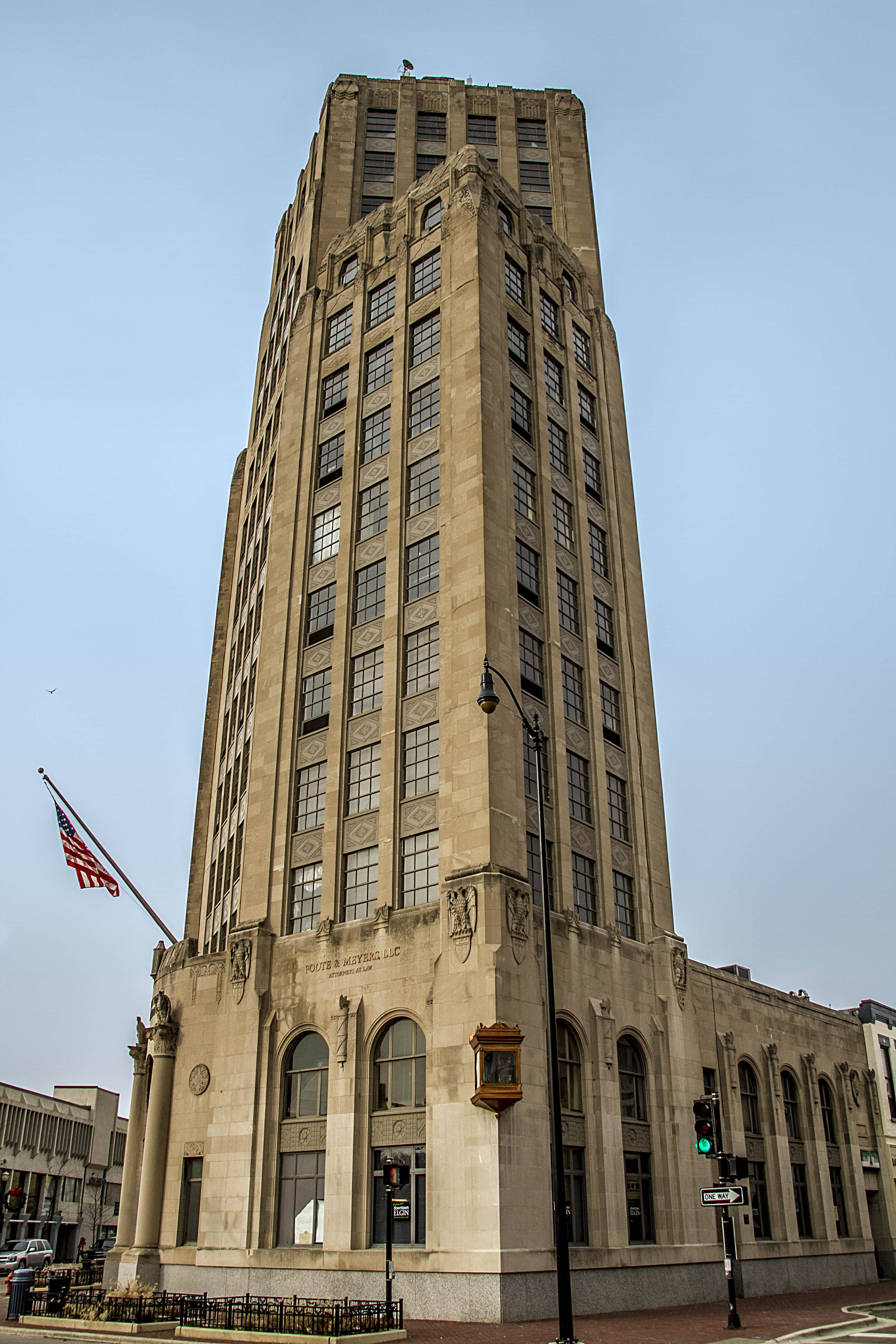
- The Elgin Tower building in Elgin, Illinois

- Location within Illinois Location within the United States
- Location: 100 E. Chicago St., Elgin, Illinois
- Coordinates: 42°2′22″N 88°17′4″W
- Built: 1929
- Architect: W. G. Knoebel
- Architectural style: Art Deco
- Part of: Elgin Downtown Commercial District (ID14001067)
- NRHP reference No.: 02000542
- Added to NRHP: May 22, 2002

The Elgin Tower Building, originally the Home Banks Building, is a historic office building in downtown Elgin, Illinois. The tower is 186 feet tall and 15 stories. It was built in 1929 to house the Home National Bank and Home National Savings and Trust. Though initially successful, the Great Depression devastated the bank only months later. The tower was again prosperous following World War II, when demand for Elgin goods increased. However, this prosperity was only temporary, and the tower again fell on hard times in the 1960s, particularly after the 1965 closing of the Elgin National Watch Company. The tower was eventually purchased by William R. Stickling, who went to great lengths to restore it. It was donated to a charity named in his honor following his 1999 death, and the William R. Stickling Charitable Foundation continues to maintain the structure. Its restoration is considered a major part of a hopeful rehabilitation of downtown Elgin. The tower is one of only two Art Deco buildings in Elgin and was added to the National Register of Historic Places in 2002. An elevator in the building that had a wooden interior was destroyed by arson on May 4, 2014. The building was then purchased in 2016 by Capstone Development and renovated into apartments.

== History ==
Elgin, Illinois was founded on the Fox River in 1835. The Galena and Chicago Union Railroad connected to the city in 1850, allowing Elgin to become a supplier of dairy products to Chicago. In 1865, the Elgin National Watch Company opened and became a major employer. The great success of Elgin National led other manufacturers to build factories within Elgin. Elgin's prosperity led to the opening of a number of banks by the late 19th century. The Elgin First National Bank opened in 1865 and was followed by the Home National Bank in 1872. The Aurora, Elgin and Fox River Electric Company opened in 1895, connecting Elgin with other Fox River Valley settlements, and the Aurora, Elgin and Chicago Railroad allowed easy access to and from Chicago in 1903. By 1920, downtown Elgin featured eleven clothing stores, two hotels, two department stores, and a Woolworth's. The Home National Bank was an important investor in these businesses, and often had to build extensions on its three-story building in Fountain Square. Home National Savings and Trust was responsible for managing the Elgin National payroll. Eventually, the bank's officials decided that the small building would no longer suffice, and ordered the construction of a new building in 1927.

Construction of the Home Banks Building began in March 1928 and was managed by the St. Louis Building and Equipment Company. It was completed in May 1929 at a cost of $800,000. Home National Bank and Home National Savings and Trust were the main occupants, but they leased many of their new offices to other local businesses, opening at 70% capacity. Its completion of the city's first skyscraper was seen as the dawning of a new era for Elgin. The bank boasted state-of-the-art vaults, which were fireproof and burglar-proof.

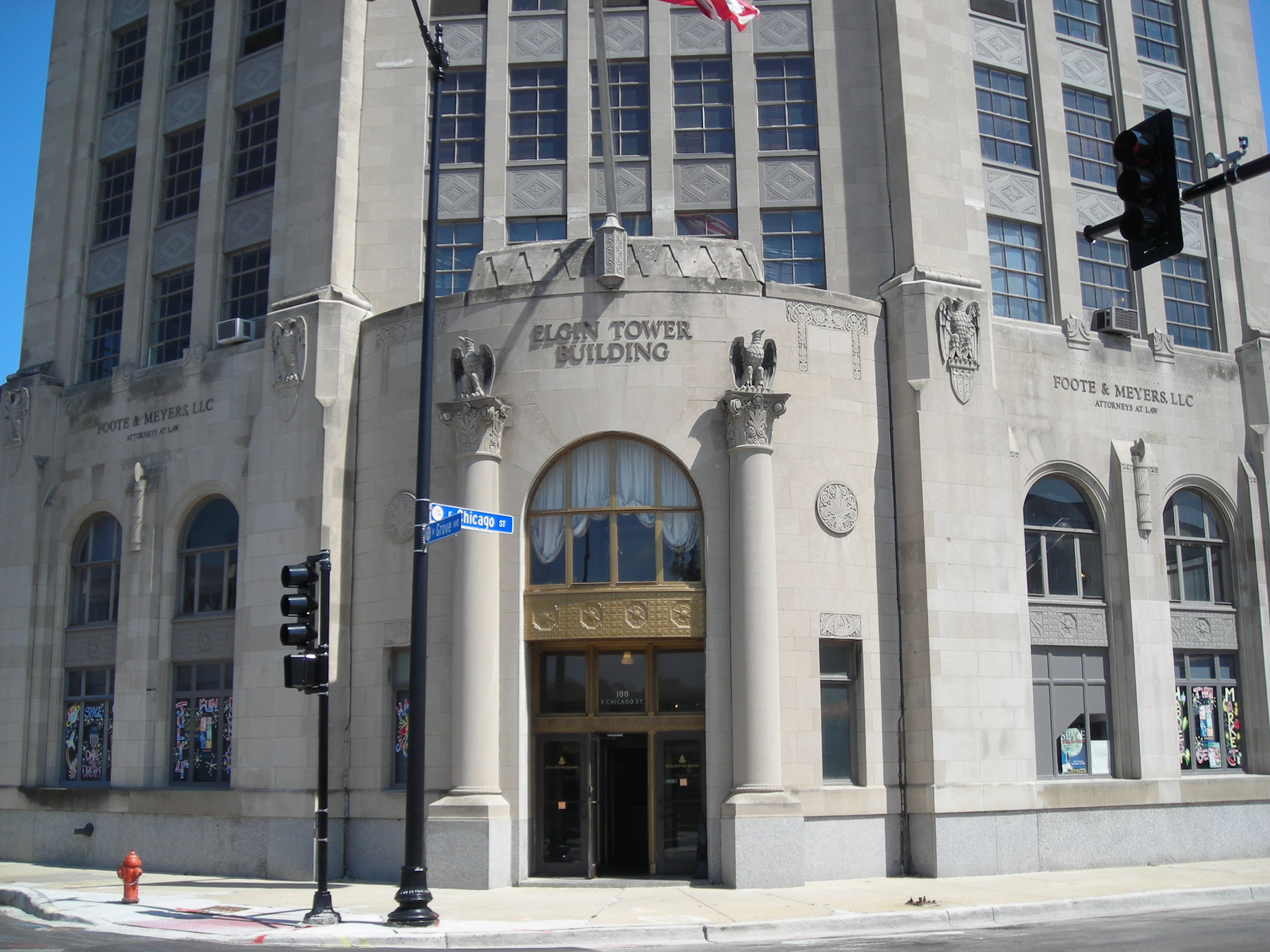
The entrance of the Elgin Tower Building

However, like many banks of the day, Home National Bank collapsed during the Great Depression. By the time Home National declared bankruptcy in 1932, only 35% of the building was still occupied. The First National Bank of Chicago assumed control of the building in August 1932. The building's new owner, who renamed the structure the Elgin Tower Building, was able to increase occupancy to 60% thanks in part to a ban on new construction in Elgin. The Depression years were meager, but a Walgreens did open on the ground floor. The end of World War II in 1945 brought a great demand for manufactured supplies, again making Elgin an important industrial center. Also in 1945, investor Otto Pelikan purchased the building. It filled to nearly full capacities from the late 1940s through the 1950s.

The Elgin Tower Building again declined in usage in the 1960s as demand for Elgin's manufactured goods attenuated. Walgreens vacated in 1957, although a successful restaurant opened in its place. The Elgin National Watch Company closed in 1965, signaling the end of Elgin's relevance as a major industrial town. Furthermore, a new bypass of Elgin was opened for U.S. Route 20. The 1971 opening of Woodfield Mall in nearby Schaumburg sharply decreased shopping demand in the city, and, in the early 1980s, major retailers such as Sears and JC Penney shuttered their downtown Elgin stores and relocated to Spring Hill Mall. By 1980, occupancy at Elgin National Tower was as low as 40%. Following Pelikan's death in 1967, the tower changed owners several times. The tower's facade was restored by the Williams family in 1975 in an effort to rehabilitate the downtown area. Three years later, William Stickling purchased the tower and continued to make improvements. The most substantial of these restorations came in 1996 at a cost of millions of dollars. Special lighting was installed on the building's exterior in 1999 to showcase its architectural merit. Stickling died later that year, but his benefactors transferred the building to the William R. Stickling Charitable Foundation, who currently maintain the building. An addition was built in 1999 to house, rent-free, the Downtown Neighborhood Association, who intend to revitalize the downtown area. The tower was added to the National Register of Historic Places on May 22, 2002.

== Architecture ==
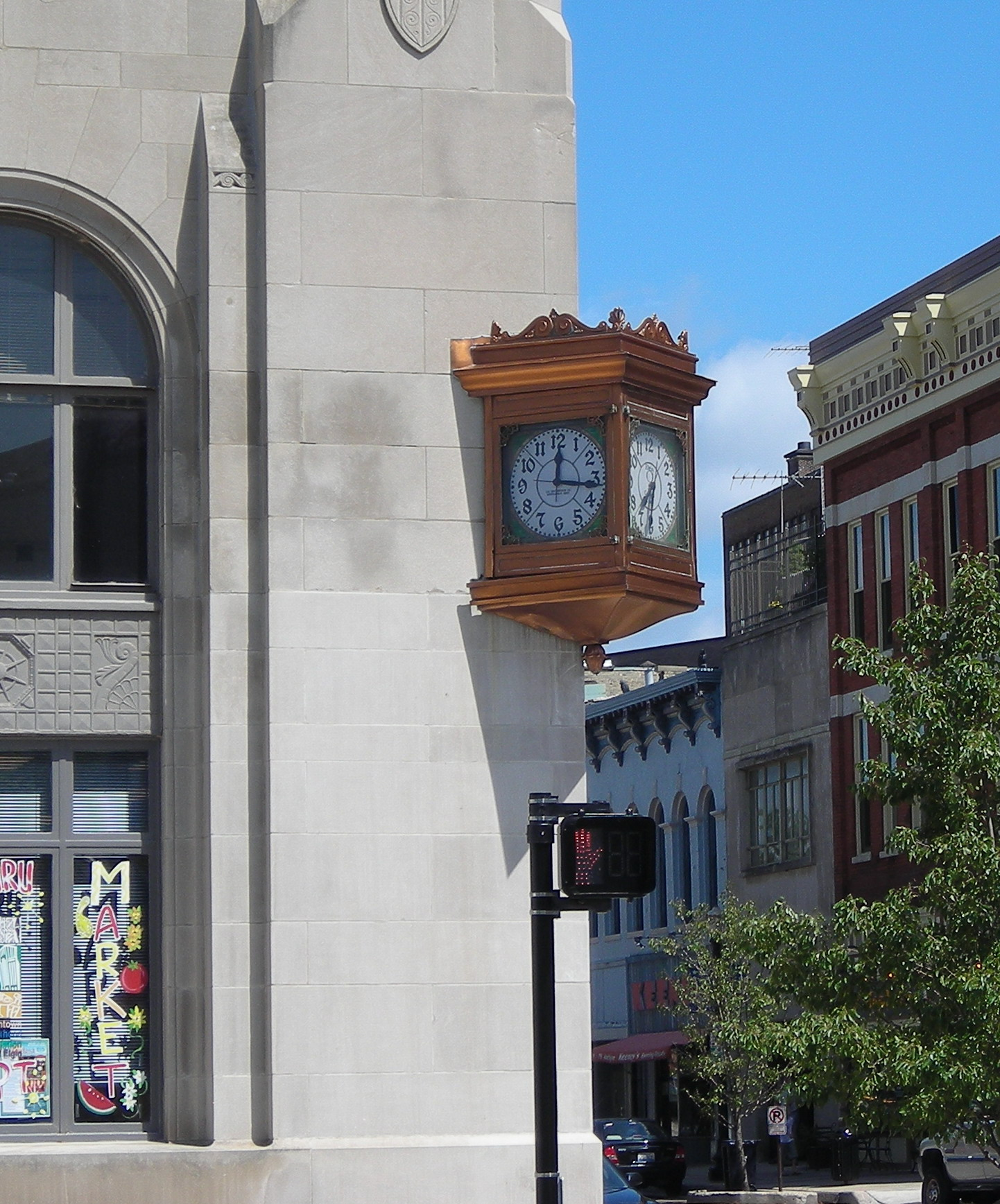
The clock on the east side of the building.

The Elgin Tower Building is located at 100 E. Chicago St. in Elgin, between Douglas and N. Grove Avenues. This area has historically been known as Fountain Square, generally accepted as the downtown area of Elgin. The nearby bridge on Chicago Street was the only bridge across the Fox River at the time of its construction. The fifteen-story structure, designed by W. G. Knoebel, is one of only two Art Deco buildings in the city. The two-story base extends 31 feet (9.4 m) beyond the upper thirteen floors on the west side and 25 feet (7.6 m) on the west side. Small retail buildings have since adjoined on this base. The building's entrance, two sets of three glass doors, faces the southwest and is flanked by Corinthian columns. An eagle statue adorns the top of each column. Classic elements are carved into the limestone base, consistent with Art Deco style. Seven bas-relief eagles are carved on the top of the second floor, below a zig-zagging parapet. Windows are arched and feature high relief fasces. A three-faced clock is found on the east corner; the Home National Bank previously advertised the building as "The Bank with the Clock". The clock is in a copper case with copper and bronze ornamentation.
