= Campton Hills, Illinois =

Campton Hills
- Village
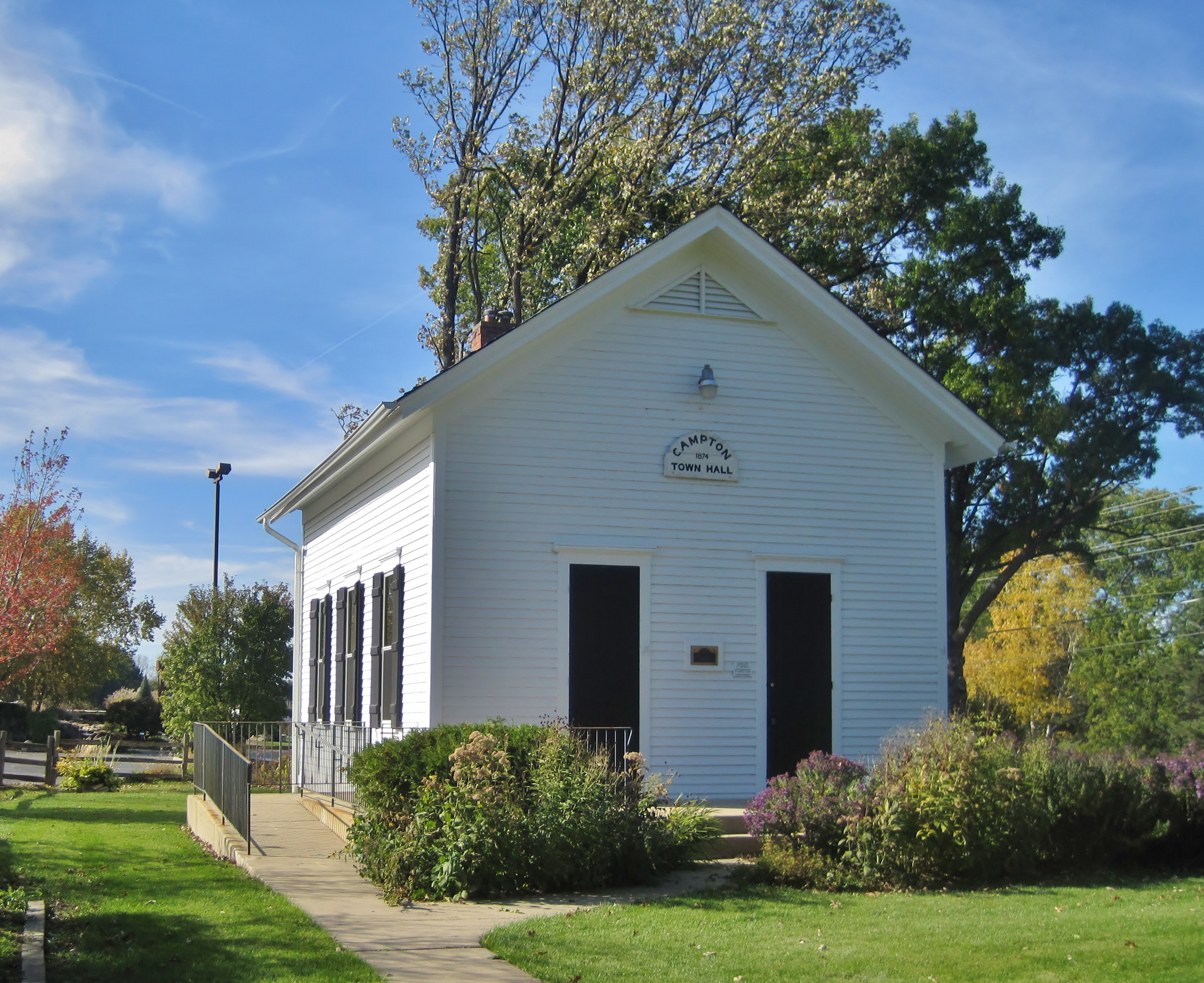
- Campton Town Hall has been used continuously since being built in 1874.

- Location of Campton Hills in Kane County, Illinois

- Location of Illinois in the United States
- Coordinates: 41°57′15″N 88°25′00″W
- Country: United States
- State: Illinois
- County: Kane
- Township: Campton, Plato, Blackberry

Government
  - Village President: Barbara Wojnicki

Area
  - Total: 16.97 sq mi (43.95 km^{2})
  - Land: 16.89 sq mi (43.75 km^{2})
  - Water: 0.081 sq mi (0.21 km^{2})
- Elevation: 846 ft (258 m)

Population (2020)
  - Total: 10,885
  - Density: 644.5/sq mi (248.83/km^{2})
- Time zone: UTC-6 (CST)
  - Summer (DST): UTC-5 (CDT)
- ZIP Codes: 60119, 60124, 60147, 60151, 60175, 60183
- Area codes: 224/847 and 331/630
- FIPS code: 17-10906
- GNIS feature ID: 2357470
- Wikimedia Commons: Campton Hills, Illinois
- Website: camptonhills.illinois.gov

Campton Hills is a village in Kane County, Illinois, and is a western suburb of Chicago. The population of the village is 10,885 per the 2020 US Census.

== History ==
The village was established on May 14, 2007, by incorporating 20.3 square miles of Campton and Plato townships, including the unincorporated community of Wasco. The incorporation followed an April 17 referendum in which 55 percent of voters approved incorporation. Several areas on the village's boundaries disconnected within the first year of incorporation, taking advantage of less restrictive requirements imposed by state statute during that period. As of August 2009, the village comprised 17.16 square miles (44.4 km^{2}).

The village is served by three school districts. The majority is served by St. Charles Community Unit School District 303 while the northern end is served by Central Community Unit School District 301. Kaneland Community Unit School District 302 serves the far southwest portion of the village.

The first president and one of the founders of the village was Patsy Smith. Due to confusion over the requirements of Illinois election laws, an opposition group filed nominating petitions for a primary election to be held in February 2015; in previous municipal elections it had been believed that a primary was not required for the non-partisan general election. Over the objections of Smith and her supporters, a Kane County judge affirmed the requirement for a primary. Forced to run as a write-in candidate in the general election, Smith lost in her bid for re-election to Harry Blecker, an incumbent village trustee who had appeared on the primary ballot as a candidate for village president.

=== Comprehensive plan ===
In July 2012, the village released a comprehensive plan detailing future outlooks and developmental goals. Topics included village history, demographics, an outline of principles, policies and strategies, and also proposals for further commercial, residential and community development.

As of March 2013, Campton Hills has an established open space initiative.

== Geography ==
Campton Hills is bordered by Saint Charles to the east, Lily Lake to the west, Elburn to the south and Elgin to the north.

According to the 2021 census gazetteer files, Campton Hills has a total area of 16.97 square miles (43.95 km^{2}), of which 16.89 square miles (43.74 km^{2}) (or 99.53%) is land and 0.08 square miles (0.21 km^{2}) (or 0.47%) is water.

== Demographics ==
Historical population
Census	Pop.	Note	%±
2010	11,131		—
2020	10,885		−2.2%
U.S. Decennial Census

=== Racial and ethnic composition ===
Campton Hills village, Illinois – Racial and ethnic composition Note: the US Census treats Hispanic/Latino as an ethnic category. This table excludes Latinos from the racial categories and assigns them to a separate category. Hispanics/Latinos may be of any race.
Race / Ethnicity (NH = Non-Hispanic)	Pop 2010	Pop 2020	% 2010	% 2020
White alone (NH)	10,341	9,480	92.90%	87.09%
Black or African American alone (NH)	57	91	0.51%	0.84%
Native American or Alaska Native alone (NH)	12	6	0.11%	0.06%
Asian alone (NH)	197	257	1.77%	2.36%
Native Hawaiian or Pacific Islander alone (NH)	6	0	0.05%	0.00%
Other race alone (NH)	13	22	0.12%	0.20%
Mixed race or Multiracial (NH)	99	413	0.89%	3.79%
Hispanic or Latino (any race)	406	616	3.65%	5.66%
Total	11,131	10,885	100.00%	100.00%

=== 2020 census ===
As of the 2020 census, Campton Hills had a population of 10,885. There were 3,235 families residing in the village. The population density was 641.43 inhabitants per square mile (247.66/km^{2}). The median age was 43.5 years. 25.1% of residents were under the age of 18 and 15.7% of residents were 65 years of age or older. For every 100 females there were 103.6 males, and for every 100 females age 18 and over there were 101.1 males age 18 and over.

89.2% of residents lived in urban areas, while 10.8% lived in rural areas.

There were 3,536 households in Campton Hills, of which 39.4% had children under the age of 18 living in them. Of all households, 79.3% were married-couple households, 7.9% were households with a male householder and no spouse or partner present, and 9.5% were households with a female householder and no spouse or partner present. About 9.2% of all households were made up of individuals and 4.7% had someone living alone who was 65 years of age or older. The average household size was 3.24 and the average family size was 3.12.

There were 3,641 housing units at an average density of 214.56 per square mile (82.84/km^{2}), of which 2.9% were vacant. The homeowner vacancy rate was 0.8% and the rental vacancy rate was 4.9%.

=== Income and poverty ===
The median income for a household in the village was $173,503, and the median income for a family was $175,156. Males had a median income of $100,291 versus $36,885 for females. The per capita income for the village was $66,605. About 1.7% of families and 2.9% of the population were below the poverty line, including 1.4% of those under age 18 and 5.1% of those age 65 or over.
