= Plastic (disambiguation) =

Plastic is a polymerized material. It may also refer to:

== Science and technology ==
- Plastic SCM, a distributed revision control tool
- Plasticity (physics), a material that has high plasticity may be called plastic
- Phenotypic plasticity, the ability of an organism to change its phenotype in response to changes in the environment

== Arts, entertainment, and media ==
- Plastic (2011 film), American horror film
- Plastic (2014 film), a British crime film
- Plastics (band) (1976–1981), a Japanese new wave band
- Plastic (Mitsuki Aira album), 2009
- Plastic (Joey Tafolla album), 2001
- "Plastic" (New Order song), 2015
- "Plastic" (Spiderbait song), 1999
- "Plastic", a song by Alanis Morissette from Alanis, 1991
- "Plastic", a song by Prefuse 73 from One Word Extinguisher, 2003
- "Plastic", a song by Pussy Riot from Matriarchy Now, 2022
- "Plastic", a song by Slayyyter from Starfucker, 2023
- Plastic (comic book), a comic book series published by the American company Image Comics
- Plastic arts, art forms involving physical manipulation of a plastic medium, such as sculpture or ceramics
- Plastic.com, a community-driven message board

== Other uses ==
- Plastic, Polish video game developer most notable for Linger in Shadows
- Plastic, a colloquial term for a credit card or debit card
- Plastics Industry Association, a trade group, sometimes stylized as PLASTICS

== See also ==
- The Plastics (disambiguation)
- Plastik, 1999 album by Oomph!
- Plastique (disambiguation)
