= The Einstein Academy (Elgin, Illinois) =

Coordinates: 42.066752°N 88.298218°W

- Elgin, Illinois; United States

Information
- Type: Private, Independent
- Established: 2002
- Head of school: Cathryn Ilani
- Grades: PreK - 12
- Colors: Purple, Black & White
- Mascot: Panthers
- Website: www.einsteinacademy.us

The Einstein Academy is a small, private school for talented and gifted students in Pre-kindergarten through High school. The academy is registered as a 501(c)(3) Nonprofit organization in Elgin, Illinois, and is accredited by the North Central Association of Colleges and Schools.

The school has affiliations with the Illinois Association for Gifted Children, College Board, and the National Honor Society.
