= North Plato, Illinois =

- Unincorporated community
- Location within Illinois Location within the United States
- Coordinates: 42.055035°N 88.464248°W
- Country: United States
- State: Illinois
- County: Kane
- Township: Plato
- Elevation: 965 ft (294 m)
- Time zone: UTC-6 (Central (CST))
  - Summer (DST): UTC-5 (CDT)
- ZIP code: 60140 (Hampshire)
- GNIS feature ID: 423028

North Plato is an unincorporated community in Kane County, Illinois, United States, located directly northwest of Plato Center. It is about equidistant between Hampshire and Plato Center. The center of the community is located exactly near the intersection of Plank Road and Illinois Route 47.
