= Wasco, Illinois =

- Former unincorporated community
- Location within Illinois Location within the United States
- Coordinates: 41°56′17″N 88°24′16″W
- Country: United States
- State: Illinois
- County: Kane
- Village: Campton Hills
- Elevation: 820 ft (250 m)
- Time zone: UTC-6 (Central (CST))
  - Summer (DST): UTC-5 (CDT)
- ZIP code: 60183
- Area codes: 630 & 331
- GNIS feature ID: 420545

Wasco is a former unincorporated community that became part of the village of Campton Hills, Illinois, when it was formed in 2007. Wasco is in Kane County, 40 miles (64 km) west of Chicago. It has a post office (ZIP Code 60183), a few restaurants, and an elementary school. The community is located along Illinois Route 64 approximately 4 miles (6 km) west of St. Charles and is at the center of the village of Campton Hills. The area outside the downtown section is mostly residential homes, spanning several blocks.

== History ==
Wasco was originally named "Campton", after an early family that settled the area. The Wasco post office was originally built in 1836 by a lay preacher named Dr. King on King's Mill Road near Lake Campton. The post office was then moved to its present location on Illinois Route 64 in 1890. Throughout the years, the building has undergone multiple renovations and has served many different functions, including a milk depot, a general store, an antique store, and a repair shop. Other historic buildings in Wasco include the Campton Town Hall built in 1873, the Wasco Baptist Church built in 1891, and Wasco Elementary built in 1906.
