= Bowes, Illinois =

- Unincorporated community
- Location within Illinois Location within the United States
- Coordinates: 42°00′29″N 88°23′27″W
- Country: United States
- State: Illinois
- County: Kane
- Township: Plato
- Elevation: 853 ft (260 m)
- Time zone: UTC-6 (Central (CST))
  - Summer (DST): UTC-5 (CDT)
- Area codes: 847 & 224
- GNIS feature ID: 404737

Bowes is an unincorporated community in Plato Township, Kane County, Illinois, United States, located at the intersection of Bowes and Nesler Roads.
