= Udina, Illinois =

- Unincorporated community
- Location within Illinois Location within the United States
- Coordinates: 42°02′36″N 88°22′34″W
- Country: United States
- State: Illinois
- County: Kane
- Township: Elgin, Plato
- Elevation: 902 ft (275 m)
- Time zone: UTC-6 (Central (CST))
  - Summer (DST): UTC-5 (CDT)
- Area codes: 847 & 224
- GNIS feature ID: 420005

Udina is an unincorporated community in Elgin and Plato Townships, Kane County, Illinois, United States. It is located mainly at the intersection of Coombs Road, U.S. Route 20 and Plank Road. The Pingree Grove Fire Department, Klein's Farm & Garden Market, and Plank Road Tap Room are located here.
