= Almora, Illinois =

- Unincorporated community
- Location within Illinois Location within the United States
- Coordinates: 42°03′39″N 88°20′10″W
- Country: United States
- State: Illinois
- County: Kane
- Township: Elgin
- Elevation: 863 ft (263 m)
- Time zone: UTC-6 (Central (CST))
  - Summer (DST): UTC-5 (CDT)
- Area codes: 847 & 224
- GNIS feature ID: 422402

Almora is an unincorporated community in Kane County, in the U.S. state of Illinois.

== History ==
Almora had its start in the 1880s when the railroad was extended to that point. A post office called Almora was established in 1885, and remained in operation until it was discontinued in 1910. Although an older source states Almora was named after "a European city", a more recent source proposes the name may be after Almora, in India.
