= Lily Lake, Illinois =

- Village
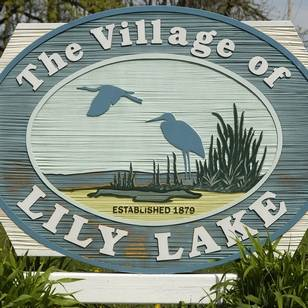
- Welcome sign on Illinois Route 47

- Location of Lily Lake in Kane County, Illinois

- Location of Illinois in the United States
- Coordinates: 41°57′06″N 88°28′28″W
- Country: United States
- State: Illinois
- County: Kane
- Township: Campton

Area
  - Total: 2.72 sq mi (7.04 km^{2})
  - Land: 2.72 sq mi (7.04 km^{2})
  - Water: 0 sq mi (0.00 km^{2})
- Elevation: 958 ft (292 m)

Population (2020)
  - Total: 1,032
  - Density: 379.8/sq mi (146.66/km^{2})
- Time zone: UTC-6 (CST)
  - Summer (DST): UTC-5 (CDT)
- ZIP Code(s): 60151
- Area code: 331
- FIPS code: 17-43406
- GNIS feature ID: 2398437
- Wikimedia Commons: Lily Lake, Illinois
- Website: www.lilylakeil.gov

Lily Lake is a village in Kane County, Illinois, United States. The town is 15 miles (24 km) southwest of Elgin and 50 miles (80 km) west of Chicago. The village is in the far western part the Chicago metro area. It was incorporated as a village on November 6, 1990. The population was 1,032 at the 2020 census, up from 993 in 2010.

== History ==
Lily Lake was originally called "Canada Corners" (after the large number of Canadians settled there) and was located further north. The settlement shifted its location when the railroad was built and changed its name to "Lily Lake", referring to a local lake.

== Geography ==
Lily Lake is located in west central Kane County in the western part of Campton Township. Neighboring villages are Campton Hills to the east and Virgil to the west.

According to the 2021 census gazetteer files, Lily Lake has a total area of 2.72 square miles (7.04 km^{2}), of which 2.72 square miles (7.04 km^{2}) (or 99.96%) is land and 0.00 square miles (0.00 km^{2}) (or 0.04%) is water.

== Demographics ==
Historical population
Census	Pop.	Note	%±
2000	825		—
2010	993		20.4%
2020	1,032		3.9%
U.S. Decennial Census

=== Racial and ethnic composition ===
Lily Lake village, Illinois – Racial and ethnic composition Note: the US Census treats Hispanic/Latino as an ethnic category. This table excludes Latinos from the racial categories and assigns them to a separate category. Hispanics/Latinos may be of any race.
Race / Ethnicity (NH = Non-Hispanic)	Pop 2000	Pop 2010	Pop 2020	% 2000	% 2010	% 2020
White alone (NH)	797	941	902	96.61%	94.76%	87.40%
Black or African American alone (NH)	7	2	19	0.85%	0.20%	1.84%
Native American or Alaska Native alone (NH)	0	0	1	0.00%	0.00%	0.10%
Asian alone (NH)	2	2	7	0.24%	0.20%	0.68%
Native Hawaiian or Pacific Islander alone (NH)	0	0	0	0.00%	0.00%	0.00%
Other race alone (NH)	0	1	6	0.00%	0.10%	0.58%
Mixed race or Multiracial (NH)	2	1	34	0.24%	0.10%	3.29%
Hispanic or Latino (any race)	17	46	63	2.06%	4.63%	6.10%
Total	825	993	1,032	100.00%	100.00%	100.00%

=== 2020 census ===
As of the 2020 census, Lily Lake had a population of 1,032. The median age was 43.4 years. 21.9% of residents were under the age of 18 and 15.5% were 65 years of age or older. For every 100 females, there were 102.4 males; for every 100 females age 18 and over, there were 104.6 males.

75.1% of residents lived in urban areas, while 24.9% lived in rural areas.

There were 347 households, of which 34.6% had children under the age of 18 living in them. Of all households, 79.8% were married-couple households, 6.1% had a male householder with no spouse or partner present, and 9.5% had a female householder with no spouse or partner present. About 8.0% of all households were made up of individuals, and 3.7% had someone living alone who was 65 years of age or older.

There were 359 housing units, of which 3.3% were vacant. The homeowner vacancy rate was 0.6% and the rental vacancy rate was 4.8%. The population density was 379.69 inhabitants per square mile (146.60/km^{2}). There were 359 housing units at an average density of 132.08 per square mile (51.00/km^{2}).

=== Income and poverty ===
The median income for a household in the village was $119,792, and the median income for a family was $127,778. Males had a median income of $66,731 versus $33,750 for females. The per capita income for the village was $49,711. No families and 0.8% of the population were below the poverty line, including none of those under age 18 and none of those age 65 or over.
