= Pingree Grove, Illinois =

- Village
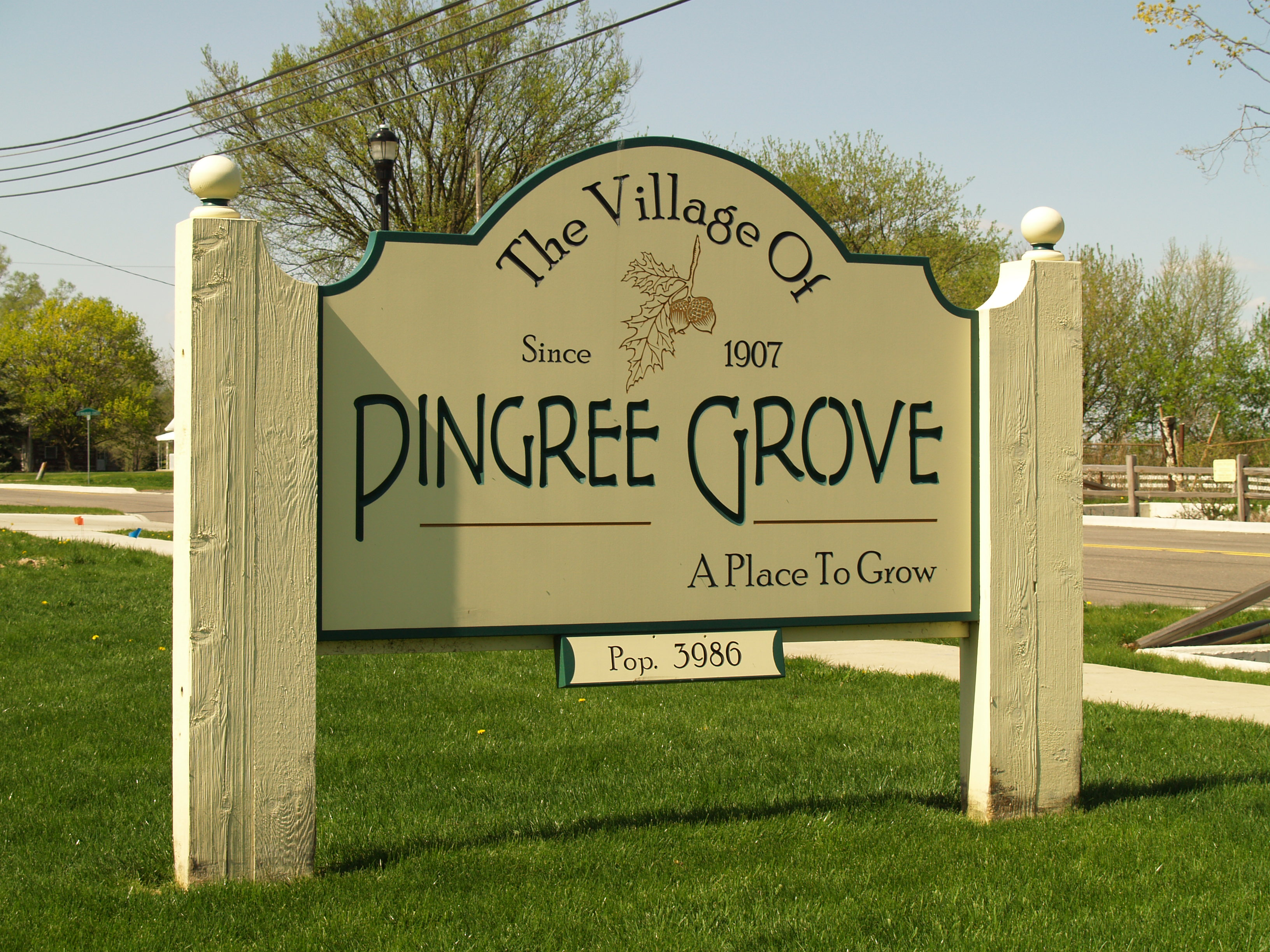
- Village sign

- Location of Pingree Grove in Kane County, Illinois

- Location of Illinois in the United States
- Coordinates: 42°05′08″N 88°26′10″W
- Country: United States
- State: Illinois
- County: Kane
- Townships: Rutland, Plato

Government
  - Village President: Amber Kubiak

Area
  - Total: 3.64 sq mi (9.42 km^{2})
  - Land: 3.64 sq mi (9.42 km^{2})
- Elevation: 912 ft (278 m)

Population (2020)
  - Total: 10,365
  - Density: 2,850/sq mi (1,100.2/km^{2})
- Time zone: UTC-6 (CST)
  - Summer (DST): UTC-5 (CDT)
- ZIP code: 60140, 60166
- Area codes: 847 and 224
- FIPS code: 17-59988
- GNIS feature ID: 2399676
- Wikimedia Commons: Pingree Grove, Illinois
- Website: www.villageofpingreegrove.org

Pingree Grove (/ˈpɪŋɡʌriː/ PING-GREE) is a village in Kane County, Illinois, United States. The population was 124 at the 2000 census. However, with rapid development in the following years, the 2010 census indicated 4,532 residents, and the 2020 census was 10,365.

== Geography ==
Pingree Grove is located in northern Kane County. Neighboring communities are Hampshire to the west, Huntley to the north, Gilberts to the northeast, Plato Center to the south, and the city of Elgin to the southeast. U.S. Route 20 passes through the village, leading northwest 17 miles (27 km) to Marengo and southeast 7 miles (11 km) into Elgin. Downtown Chicago is 45 miles (72 km) southeast of Pingree Grove.

According to the 2021 census gazetteer files, Pingree Grove has a total area of 3.64 square miles (9.43 km^{2}), all land.

== Demographics ==
Historical population
Census	Pop.	Note	%±
1910	135		—
1920	115		−14.8%
1930	125		8.7%
1940	130		4.0%
1950	162		24.6%
1960	173		6.8%
1970	174		0.6%
1980	183		5.2%
1990	138		−24.6%
2000	124		−10.1%
2010	4,532		3,554.8%
2020	10,365		128.7%
U.S. Decennial Census; 2010 2020

=== Racial and ethnic composition ===
Pingree Grove village, Illinois – Racial and ethnic composition Note: the US Census treats Hispanic/Latino as an ethnic category. This table excludes Latinos from the racial categories and assigns them to a separate category. Hispanics/Latinos may be of any race.
Race / Ethnicity (NH = Non-Hispanic)	Pop 2000	Pop 2010	Pop 2020	% 2000	% 2010	% 2020
White alone (NH)	119	3,050	6,658	95.97%	67.30%	64.24%
Black or African American alone (NH)	0	104	436	0.00%	2.29%	4.21%
Native American or Alaska Native alone (NH)	0	1	11	0.00%	0.02%	0.11%
Asian alone (NH)	0	294	657	0.00%	6.49%	6.34%
Pacific Islander alone (NH)	0	1	0	0.00%	0.02%	0.00%
Other race alone (NH)	0	5	29	0.00%	0.11%	0.28%
Mixed race or Multiracial (NH)	0	81	424	0.00%	1.79%	4.09%
Hispanic or Latino (any race)	5	996	2,150	4.03%	21.98%	20.74%
Total	124	4,532	10,365	100.00%	100.00%	100.00%

=== 2020 census ===
As of the 2020 census, Pingree Grove had a population of 10,365. The population density was 2,849.88 inhabitants per square mile (1,100.34/km^{2}), and housing density was 1,029.14 per square mile (397.35/km^{2}).

The median age was 35.0 years. 29.5% of residents were under the age of 18 and 12.6% of residents were 65 years of age or older. For every 100 females there were 95.0 males, and for every 100 females age 18 and over there were 90.9 males age 18 and over.

There were 3,586 households, including 2,359 family households. Of all households, 45.6% had children under the age of 18 living in them, 64.6% were married-couple households, 10.4% had a male householder and no spouse or partner present, and 18.8% had a female householder and no spouse or partner present. About 16.9% of all households were made up of individuals and 6.3% had someone living alone who was 65 years of age or older.

There were 3,743 housing units, of which 4.2% were vacant. The homeowner vacancy rate was 3.0% and the rental vacancy rate was 4.5%. In the village, 99.1% of residents lived in urban areas, while 0.9% lived in rural areas.

=== Income and poverty ===
The median income for a household in the village was $89,683, and the median income for a family was $98,906. Males had a median income of $70,160 versus $43,438 for females. The per capita income for the village was $41,078. About 6.2% of families and 8.0% of the population were below the poverty line, including 11.7% of those under age 18 and 4.3% of those age 65 or over.

== 2010 earthquake ==
On February 10, 2010, Pingree Grove and the surrounding areas experienced an earthquake. The shock had a moment magnitude of 3.8 and a maximum Mercalli intensity of IV (Light). It was felt 214 km (134 miles) away in Madison, Wisconsin. When the quake was first reported, it was thought Sycamore was the epicenter. However, revised data from the USGS determined the epicenter to be closer to Virgil. This was the first earthquake in Northern Illinois since a M4.2 (intensity V (Moderate)) event in 2004.
