= Plato Center, Illinois =

- Unincorporated community
- Location within Illinois Location within the United States
- Coordinates: 42°01′36″N 88°25′48″W
- Country: United States
- State: Illinois
- County: Kane
- Township: Plato
- Elevation: 922 ft (281 m)
- Time zone: UTC-6 (Central (CST))
  - Summer (DST): UTC-5 (CDT)
- ZIP code: 60124, 60170
- Area codes: 847 & 224
- GNIS feature ID: 415766

Plato Center is an unincorporated community in Kane County, Illinois, United States, located south of Pingree Grove. Plato Center has its own ZIP code, 60170, and is also part of ZIP code 60124.
