= Elgin, Illinois =

- City
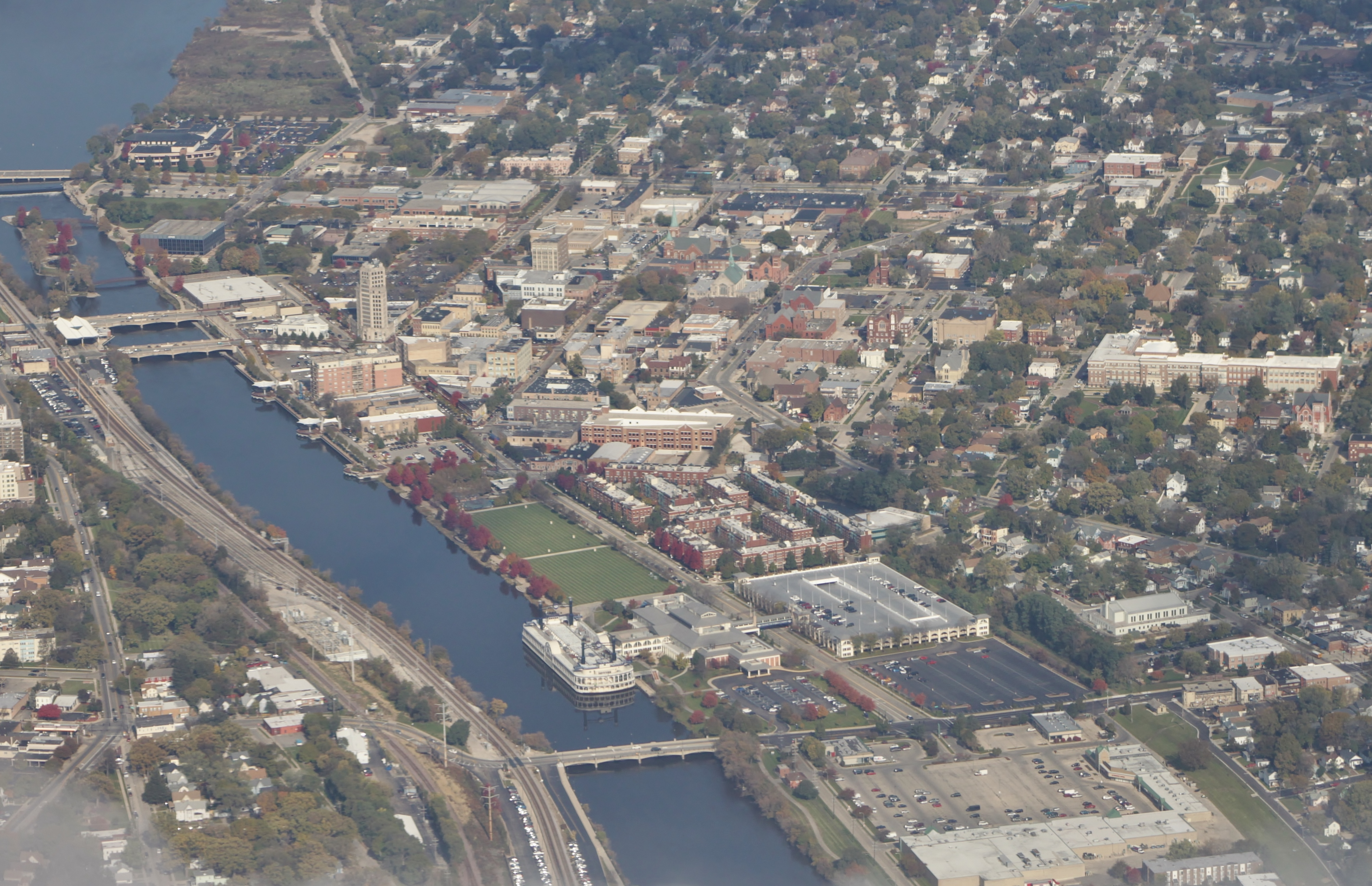
- Aerial view of downtown Elgin

- Seal Logo
- Nickname: The City in the Suburbs
- Motto: The Jewel of the Midwest
- Interactive map of Elgin, Illinois
- Location within Chicago metropolitan area Location within Illinois Location within the United States
- Coordinates: 42°02′18″N 88°19′22″W
- Country: United States
- State: Illinois
- Counties: Kane; Cook
- Townships: Elgin (Kane); Dundee (Kane); Rutland (Kane); Plato (Kane); Campton (Kane); Hanover (Cook)
- Founded: 1835
- Incorporated (city): April 24, 1854

Government
  - Type: Council–manager
  - Mayor: Dave Kaptain
  - City manager: Rick Kozal

Area
  - Total: 38.60 sq mi (99.97 km^{2})
  - Land: 38.03 sq mi (98.49 km^{2})
  - Water: 0.58 sq mi (1.49 km^{2}) 1.43%
- Elevation: 810 ft (250 m)

Population (2020)
  - Total: 114,797
  - Estimate (2024): 114,701 ▼
  - Density: 3,018.9/sq mi (1,165.59/km^{2})

Standard of living (2011)
  - Median household income: $56,091
  - Median home value: $209,800
- Time zone: UTC−6 (Central)
  - Summer (DST): UTC−5 (Central)
- ZIP code(s): 60120, 60121, 60123, 60124
- Area code(s): 224/847 and 331/630
- Geocode: 17-23074
- FIPS code: 17-23074
- Demonym: Elginite, Elginer
- Website: elginil.gov

Elgin (/ˈɛldʒɪn/ EL-jin) is a city in Cook and Kane counties in the U.S. state of Illinois. It is located 35 mi (56 km) northwest of Chicago along the Fox River. As of the 2020 census, the city had a population of 114,797, making it the sixth-most populous city in the state.

== History ==
The Indian Removal Act of 1830 and the Black Hawk Indian War of 1832 led to the expulsion of the Native Americans who had settlements and burial mounds in the area and set the stage for the founding of Elgin. Thousands of militiamen and soldiers of Gen. Winfield Scott's army marched through the Fox River valley during the war, and accounts of the area's fertile soils and flowing springs soon filtered east.

In New York, James T. Gifford and his brother Hezekiah Gifford heard tales of this area ripe for settlement, and they traveled west. Looking for a site on the stagecoach route from Chicago to Galena, Illinois, they eventually settled on a spot where the Fox River could be bridged. In April 1835, they established the city, naming it after the Scottish tune "Elgin".

Early Elgin achieved fame for the butter and dairy goods it sold to the city of Chicago. Gail Borden established a condensed milk factory here in 1866, and the local library was named in his honor. The dairy industry became less important with the arrival of the Elgin Watch Company. The watch factory employed three generations of Elginites from the late 19th century to the mid-20th century, when it was the largest producer of fine watches in the United States (the factory ceased production in 1965 and was torn down in the summer of 1966) and the operator of the largest watchmaking complex in the world. Today, the clocks at Chicago's Union Station still bear the Elgin name.

From 1910 until 1920, with the exception of the World War I years, the city hosted the Elgin National Road Races, which attracted the top national racing champions as well as many of the major automobile manufacturers. The races were sponsored by the Elgin Watch Company who offered a $1,000 prize and a silver trophy to the winner. The races contributed significantly to the development of the modern automobile.

Elgin has a long tradition of education and invention. Elgin was formerly home to the Elgin Academy, the oldest coeducational, non-sectarian college preparatory school west of the Allegheny Mountains. Its buildings have since been purchased by the Burhan Academy, an Islamic K–12 school billed as "the largest in North America". Elgin High School boasts five Navy admirals, a Nobel Prize winner, a Pulitzer Prize winner, a Tony Award winner, two Academy Award-winning producers, Olympic athletes and a General Motors CEO among its alumni. Elgin resident John Murphy invented the motorized streetsweeper in 1914 and later formed the Elgin Sweeper Corporation. Pioneering African-American chemist Lloyd Hall was an Elgin native, as was the legendary marketer and car stereo pioneer Earl "Madman" Muntz; and Max Adler, founder of the Adler Planetarium in Chicago, America's first planetarium.

In the 1990s, Elgin became one of the few cities in northern Illinois to host a riverboat casino. The Grand Victoria Casino initially generated controversy, but went on to be a significant source of income for the city. Drawing nearly four million people annually, as of March 2005 it was the fifth most popular tourist attraction in Illinois. The Grand Victoria Foundation, to which the casino had contributed an amount in excess of $116 million, provides community grants to nonprofits in the city. In the years since, more casinos have opened in the area and the Grand Victoria Casino had seen attendance and revenue decline.

In 2013, Elgin ranked number one in the Chicago metropolitan area in new home starts while ranking second in new home closings. Elgin's downtown has also been the center of city renovations and new developments. New townhouses, condo towers, loft spaces, and art galleries have opened in the last decade. In October 2003 the Gail Borden Public Library moved into a new $30 million, 139,980 square foot, 460,000 volume-capacity building, and in August 2009 opened its first-ever satellite branch. The 10,000 square foot Rakow Branch, situated on Elgin's West Side, was LEED registered, and was designed to be expandable up to 30,000 square feet. Elgin opened the 185,000 sq. ft. Centre of Elgin recreation facility across the street from the library. In 2009, Gail Borden was one of five libraries to receive the National Medal for Museum and Library Service issued by the Institute of Museum and Library Services in Washington D.C. In 2014, Elgin completed the Central Business District Streetscape Improvement Project and the Riverside Drive Promenade.

A significant Laotian American community calls Elgin home. Elgin has been a sister city of Vientiane, the capital of Laos, since 1967. Some Laotian Americans have opened stores and restaurants, contributing to the city's cultural diversity. Elgin is also home to a sizable Latino population, contributing to 45.7% of the population in 2020.

== Geography ==
=== Topography ===
Elgin is located at 42°2′18″N 88°19′22″W (42.0384225, −88.3226510).

According to the 2021 census gazetteer files, Elgin has a total area of 38.60 square miles (99.97 km^{2}), of which 38.03 square miles (98.50 km^{2}) (or 98.52%) is land and 0.57 square miles (1.48 km^{2}) (or 1.48%) is water.

=== Climate ===
Elgin is in the Hot-summer humid continental climate, or Köppen Dfa zone. The zone includes four distinct seasons. Winter is cold with snow. Spring warms up with precipitation and storms, some of which can be severe and include tornadoes. Summer has high precipitation and storms. Fall cools down.

Climate data for Elgin, Illinois (1991–2020 normals, extremes 1983–present)
Month	Jan	Feb	Mar	Apr	May	Jun	Jul	Aug	Sep	Oct	Nov	Dec	Year
Record high °F (°C)	63 (17)	70 (21)	83 (28)	91 (33)	97 (36)	101 (38)	102 (39)	98 (37)	95 (35)	89 (32)	76 (24)	68 (20)	102 (39)
Mean maximum °F (°C)	51.6 (10.9)	55.0 (12.8)	69.2 (20.7)	79.1 (26.2)	87.4 (30.8)	92.4 (33.6)	93.0 (33.9)	92.3 (33.5)	89.2 (31.8)	81.9 (27.7)	67.1 (19.5)	54.7 (12.6)	95.1 (35.1)
Mean daily maximum °F (°C)	30.1 (−1.1)	34.2 (1.2)	46.1 (7.8)	58.7 (14.8)	70.3 (21.3)	80.1 (26.7)	84.1 (28.9)	82.3 (27.9)	75.7 (24.3)	62.7 (17.1)	47.6 (8.7)	35.5 (1.9)	59.0 (15.0)
Daily mean °F (°C)	22.1 (−5.5)	25.5 (−3.6)	36.2 (2.3)	47.9 (8.8)	59.3 (15.2)	69.2 (20.7)	73.7 (23.2)	71.8 (22.1)	64.3 (17.9)	51.8 (11.0)	38.8 (3.8)	27.8 (−2.3)	49.0 (9.4)
Mean daily minimum °F (°C)	14.1 (−9.9)	16.8 (−8.4)	26.3 (−3.2)	37.0 (2.8)	48.3 (9.1)	58.4 (14.7)	63.2 (17.3)	61.2 (16.2)	52.8 (11.6)	40.9 (4.9)	30.1 (−1.1)	20.1 (−6.6)	39.1 (3.9)
Mean minimum °F (°C)	−7.0 (−21.7)	−2.6 (−19.2)	8.5 (−13.1)	23.7 (−4.6)	35.0 (1.7)	44.8 (7.1)	52.6 (11.4)	51.5 (10.8)	39.4 (4.1)	27.8 (−2.3)	15.4 (−9.2)	1.0 (−17.2)	−10.6 (−23.7)
Record low °F (°C)	−27 (−33)	−25 (−32)	−9 (−23)	11 (−12)	28 (−2)	36 (2)	45 (7)	40 (4)	29 (−2)	18 (−8)	4 (−16)	−24 (−31)	−27 (−33)
Average precipitation inches (mm)	2.02 (51)	1.87 (47)	2.37 (60)	3.96 (101)	5.12 (130)	4.46 (113)	3.98 (101)	4.33 (110)	3.53 (90)	3.31 (84)	2.68 (68)	2.22 (56)	39.85 (1,012)
Average snowfall inches (cm)	9.5 (24)	8.0 (20)	3.7 (9.4)	0.8 (2.0)	0.0 (0.0)	0.0 (0.0)	0.0 (0.0)	0.0 (0.0)	0.0 (0.0)	0.0 (0.0)	1.4 (3.6)	8.7 (22)	32.1 (82)
Average extreme snow depth inches (cm)	7.3 (19)	5.4 (14)	2.9 (7.4)	0.5 (1.3)	0.0 (0.0)	0.0 (0.0)	0.0 (0.0)	0.0 (0.0)	0.0 (0.0)	0.0 (0.0)	0.9 (2.3)	3.7 (9.4)	10.2 (26)
Average precipitation days (≥ 0.01 in)	10.0	7.9	9.6	12.5	13.1	11.1	9.4	10.1	9.1	10.8	9.9	10.4	123.9
Average snowy days (≥ 0.1 in)	7.1	5.1	2.7	0.7	0.0	0.0	0.0	0.0	0.0	0.0	1.1	5.2	21.9
Source: NOAA

On March 28, 1920, Elgin was struck by several tornadoes along the Fox River that caused significant damage to Chicago and several western suburbs. Twenty-three people were killed and several businesses and homes were destroyed, including the Opera House and Grant Theater.

== Demographics ==
Historical population
Census	Pop.	Note	%±
1860	2,797		—
1870	5,441		94.5%
1880	8,787		61.5%
1890	17,823		102.8%
1900	22,433		25.9%
1910	25,976		15.8%
1920	27,454		5.7%
1930	35,929		30.9%
1940	38,333		6.7%
1950	44,223		15.4%
1960	49,447		11.8%
1970	55,691		12.6%
1980	63,798		14.6%
1990	77,010		20.7%
2000	94,487		22.7%
2010	108,188		14.5%
2020	114,797		6.1%
2024 (est.)	114,701		−0.1%
U.S. Decennial Census; 2010 2020

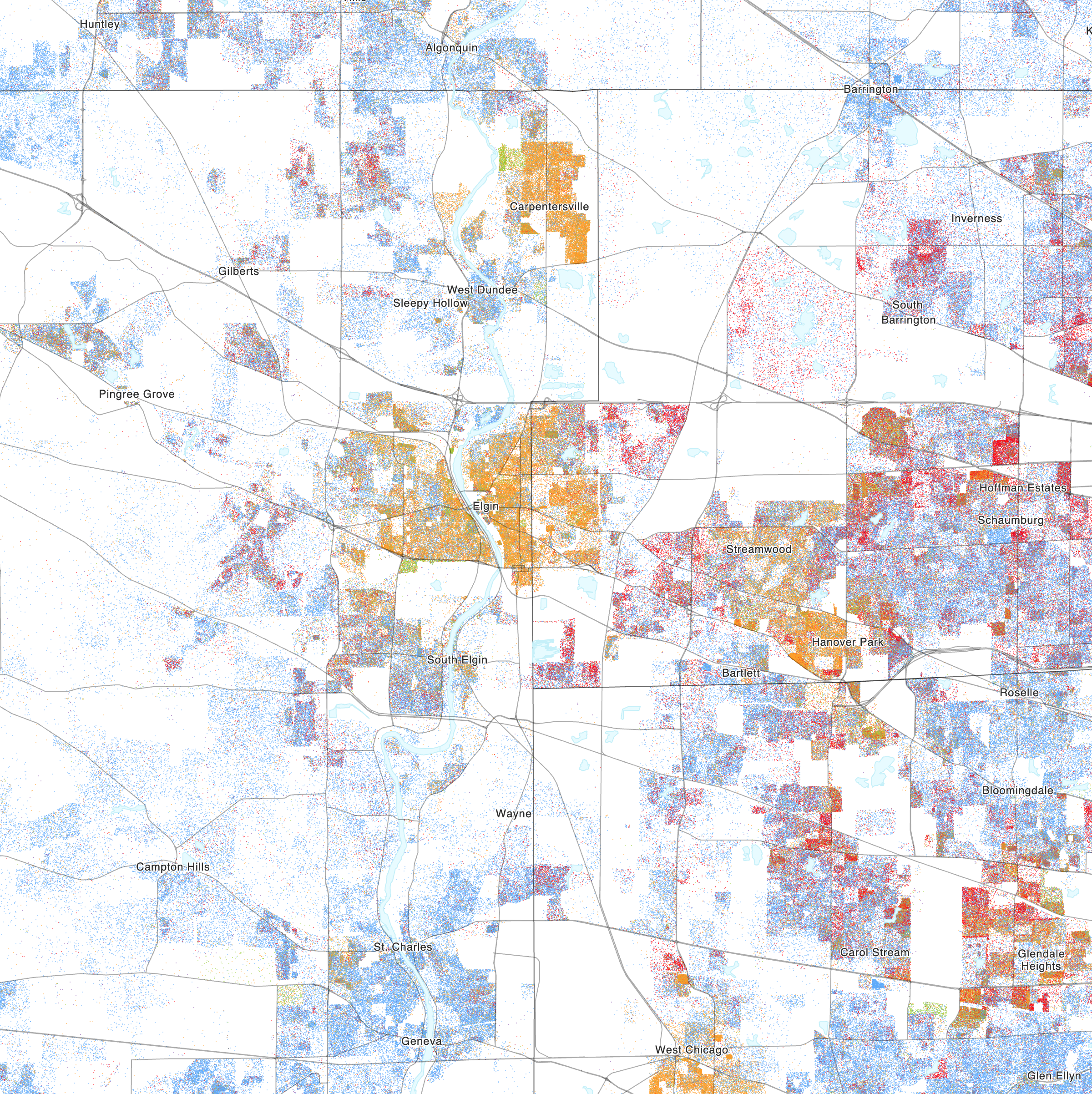
Map of racial distribution in Elgin, 2020 U.S. census. Each dot is one person: ⬤ White ⬤ Black ⬤ Asian ⬤ Hispanic ⬤ Multiracial ⬤ Native American/Other

As of the 2020 census there were 114,797 people, 36,825 households, and 26,310 families residing in the city. The population density was 2,974.02 inhabitants per square mile (1,148.28/km^{2}). There were 40,530 housing units at an average density of 1,050.00 per square mile (405.41/km^{2}). The racial makeup of the city was 43.42% White, 6.60% African American, 2.40% Native American, 6.48% Asian, 0.08% Pacific Islander, 24.33% from other races, and 16.69% from two or more races. Hispanic or Latino of any race were 47.44% of the population.

There were 36,825 households, out of which 37.5% had children under the age of 18 living with them, 52.29% were married couples living together, 13.59% had a female householder with no husband present, and 28.55% were non-families. 24.15% of all households were made up of individuals, and 9.43% had someone living alone who was 65 years of age or older. The average household size was 3.60 and the average family size was 2.99.

The city's age distribution consisted of 26.6% under the age of 18, 9.2% from 18 to 24, 27.2% from 25 to 44, 24.8% from 45 to 64, and 12.2% who were 65 years of age or older. The median age was 34.9 years. For every 100 females, there were 102.3 males. For every 100 females age 18 and over, there were 103.0 males.

The median income for a household in the city was $72,999, and the median income for a family was $82,334. Males had a median income of $41,402 versus $30,037 for females. The per capita income for the city was $29,423. About 8.8% of families and 10.5% of the population were below the poverty line, including 16.4% of those under age 18 and 6.5% of those age 65 or over.

Elgin city, Illinois – Racial and ethnic composition Note: the US Census treats Hispanic/Latino as an ethnic category. This table excludes Latinos from the racial categories and assigns them to a separate category. Hispanics/Latinos may be of any race.
Race / Ethnicity (NH = Non-Hispanic)	Pop 2000	Pop 2010	Pop 2020	% 2000	% 2010	% 2020
White alone (NH)	50,831	46,089	42,261	53.80%	42.60%	36.81%
Black or African American alone (NH)	6,100	7,467	7,207	6.46%	6.90%	6.28%
Native American or Alaska Native alone (NH)	135	144	150	0.14%	0.13%	0.13%
Asian alone (NH)	3,600	5,675	7,285	3.81%	5.25%	6.35%
Pacific Islander alone (NH)	14	19	27	0.01%	0.02%	0.02%
Other race alone (NH)	72	115	392	0.08%	0.11%	0.34%
Mixed race or Multiracial (NH)	1,305	1,558	3,015	1.38%	1.44%	2.63%
Hispanic or Latino (any race)	32,430	47,121	54,460	34.32%	43.55%	47.44%
Total	94,487	108,188	114,797	100.00%	100.00%	100.00%

== Economy ==
According to Elgin's 2018 Comprehensive Plan, the top employers in the city are:

#	Employer	# of Employees
1	Elgin Area School District U46	4,329
2	J.P. Morgan Chase	2,500
3	Advocate Sherman Hospital	2,094
4	John B. Sanfilippo (Fisher Nuts)	1,742
5	Provena Saint Joseph Hospital	1,349
6	Elgin Community College	1,064
7	Grand Victoria Casino	800
8	Elgin Mental Health Center	750
9	American NTN Bearing	675
10	City of Elgin	659
11	Motorola Solutions	400
12	Communication Test Design Inc	312

== Arts and culture ==
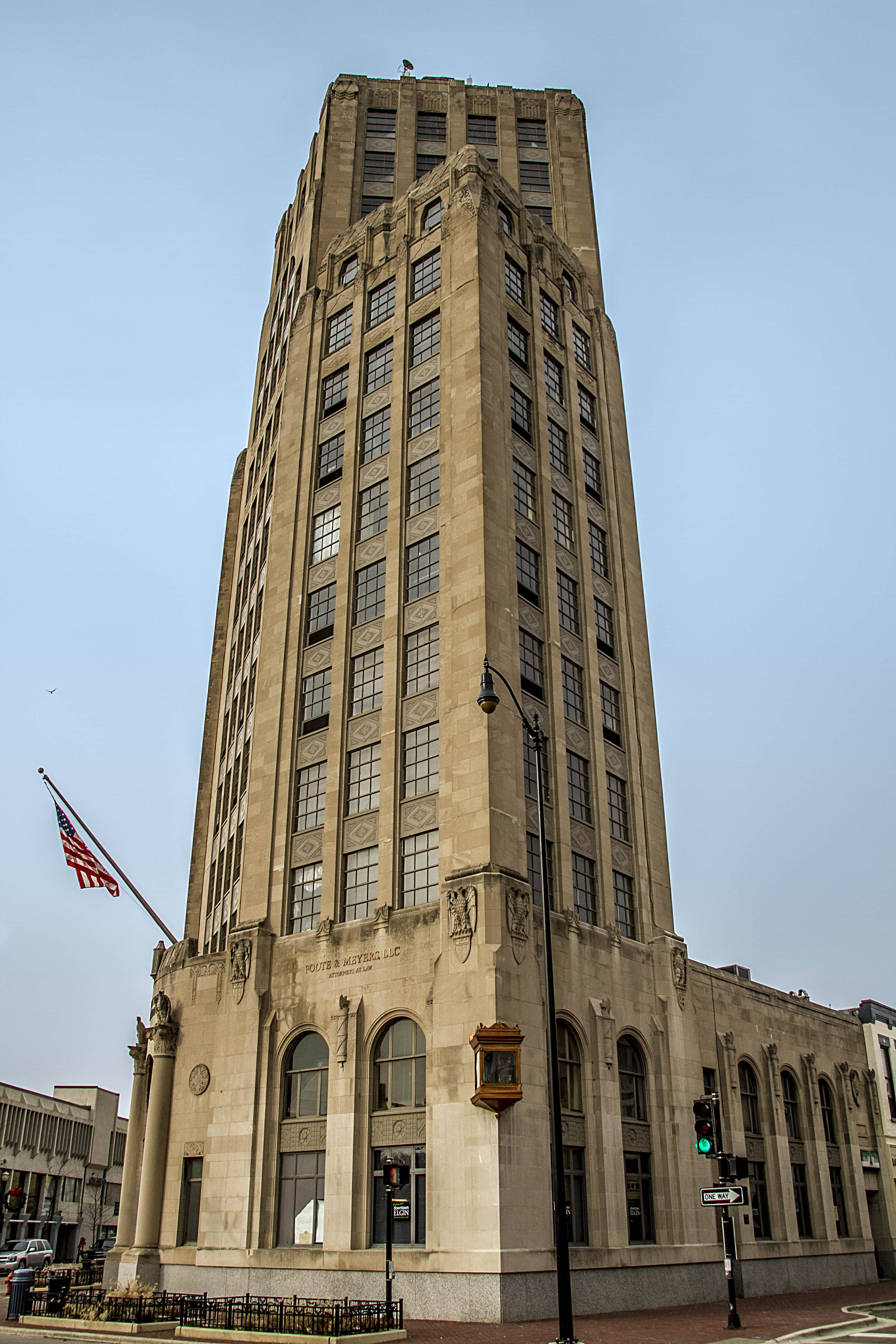
Elgin Tower Building

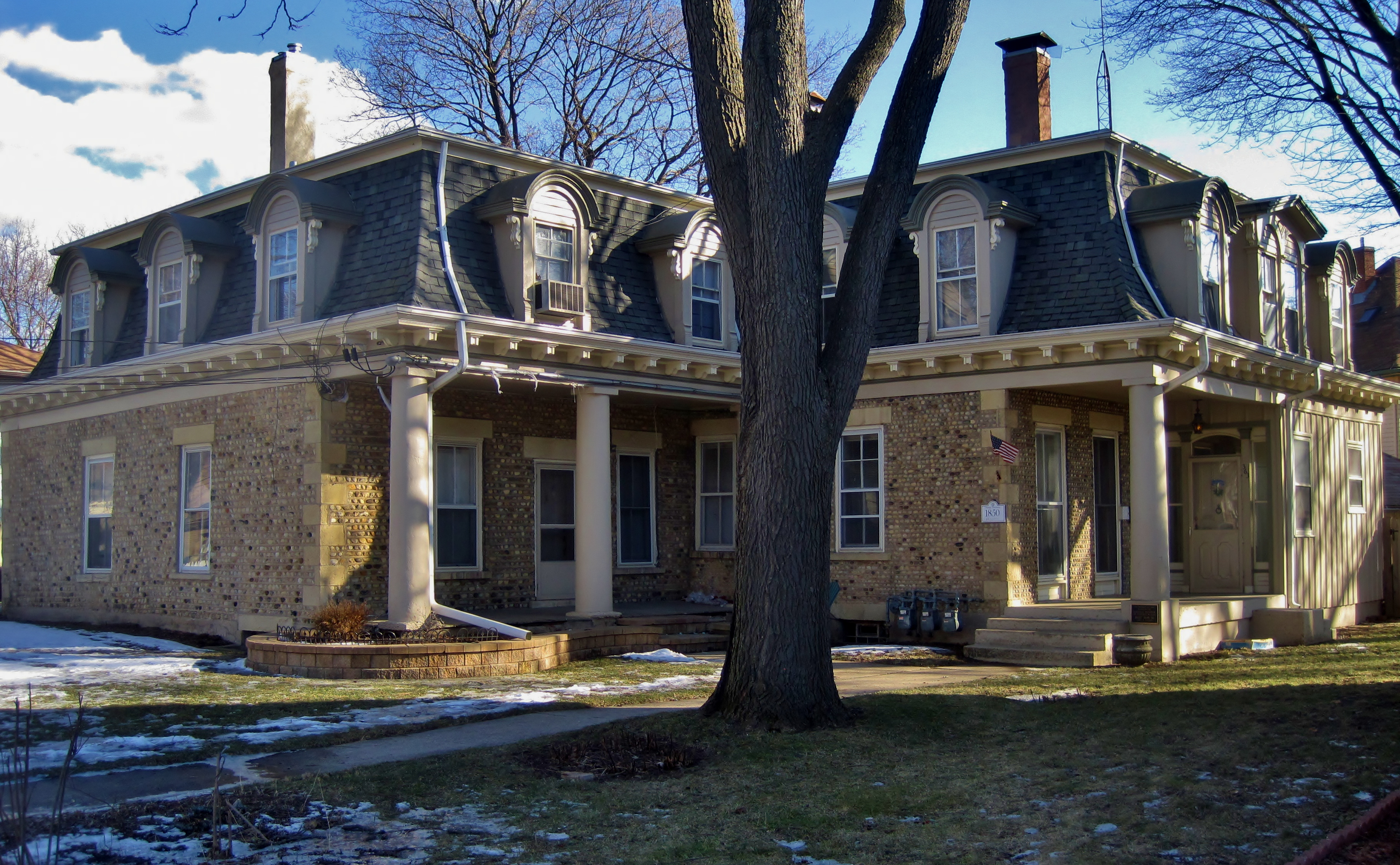
The 1850 cobblestone Gifford-Davidson House

Elgin is home to the Elgin Symphony Orchestra. Other classical music groups include the Elgin Youth Symphony Orchestra, the Elgin Master Chorale, and the Elgin Children's Chorus. Outdoor music can be heard at the Wing Park Bandshell. Theatre groups include the Janus Theatre Company, Elgin Theatre Company, the Independent Players, Children's Theatre of Elgin, Fox Valley Theatre Company, The Home Creative Company, and Nothing Special Productions. Together, The Hemmens Cultural Center and Elgin Community College's Visual & Performing Arts Center host dozens of performances a year by performers ranging from Chicago's Hubbard Street Dance Company to comedian Bill Maher.

After losing many landmark businesses in the 1980s, downtown Elgin experienced a renaissance in the 1990s with the arrival of the Grand Victoria riverboat casino and improvement in the local economy. Many historic buildings have been transformed into stylish clubs and restaurants.

=== Architecture ===
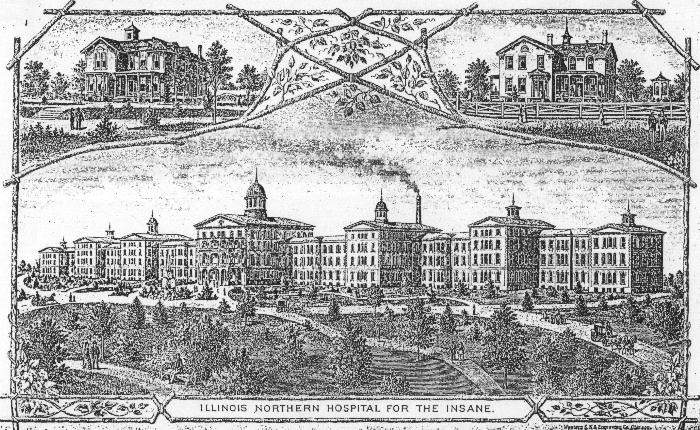
Historic print of Main Building of Elgin State Hospital, demolished in 1993

The city was known for its historic architecture and landmarks from the Victorian era, including some fine examples of homes in the Queen Anne style. Many of the most remarkable homes once belonged to National Watch Company executives. Many interesting Sears Catalog Homes arrived in Elgin as kits from 1908 to 1940. The Elgin Tower Building and the Elgin Professional Building are two large towers constructed in Elgin's heyday, before the Great Depression. The Tower Building was recently renovated, converting it to residential apartments.

Predating Victorian homes were homes made of native cobblestone. It was believed that Elgin had at one time the largest concentration of cobblestone homes outside of Rochester, New York. Several such homes built by the earliest settlers still stand. They can be seen in Elgin's historic districts, two of which are recognized by the National Register of Historic Places.

The Elgin Public Museum at Lords Park was the oldest building in Illinois built expressly as a museum that was still serving that purpose.

Open Elgin is a free, self guided tour of downtown Elgin's architecture. Each April, over two dozen buildings are accessible on the tour, though the event has been postponed due to the ongoing COVID-19 pandemic.

The nine-member Elgin Heritage Commission promotes historic preservation activity. The Gifford Park Association was also active in historic preservation, and conducts a popular annual house tour.

== Parks and recreation ==
Elgin's city parks include 112-acre (45 ha) Lords Park, which features the Elgin Public Museum and a small zoo featuring a herd of American bison, and 121-acre (49 ha) Wing Park, which includes a golf course and outdoor swimming pool. Other golf courses within Elgin include the Highlands of Elgin, the Elgin Country Club, and Bowes Creek Country Club. The Centre of Elgin, which among other features includes an aquatic park and a climbing wall, remains one of the largest municipal recreation centers in the United States. The Elgin Sports Complex on the city's southwest side offers ten lighted ballfields, ten soccer fields and The Hill BMX track. The complex hosts several local, regional and national tournaments every year. Elgin connects to Algonquin and Dundee to the north, and St. Charles, Geneva, and Batavia to the south by the Fox River Trail bike path.

Although one of the largest and fastest-growing cities in Illinois, Elgin still retains some of the natural habitat diversity that first brought settlers to this area. On the east, the city borders the 4,200-acre (1,700 ha) Poplar Creek Preserve, maintained by the Cook County Forest Preserves, which includes bike trails, hiking trails and equestrian trails. The Shoe Factory Road Prairie located in the preserve provides an example of the hill prairies that once dotted the region. Poplar Creek Preserves connects to the 4,000-acre (1,600 ha) Spring Creek Valley Forest Preserve via a conservation easement covering parts of the Sears campus.

Elgin boasts two highly protected nature preserves, the Bluff Spring Fen and Trout Park. For its size, Bluff Spring Fen has a remarkable number of distinct plant communities, including a hill prairie and a fen, or alkaline spring marshland, which is home to several rare orchids. Trout Park also includes a similar calcareous seep community, with the addition of a unique forest community of oaks, ashes, maples, and uncommon species such as arborvitae and witch-hazel. When the park was created in the 1920s, the local newspaper ran a lengthy front-page story with lists of the plant species of Trout Park, reflecting both the great variety of plants present and the interest Elginites had in conservation. In the 1960s, the Northwest Tollway bisected the site and reduced it in size.

In recent years, Elgin has increased its efforts to be more environmentally sustainable. In 2017, the city introduced free curbside textile recycling to residents, and it is the first city in Illinois to do so. Additionally, Elgin encourages its residents to compost and use rain barrels, which it sometimes subsidizes for residents to purchase. The city also has a proposed Sustainability Action Plan that includes plans for creating renewable sources of energy for the city, a curbside organics/composting pilot-program, and information about community gardens.

== Government ==
Elgin was chartered as a city by the State of Illinois in 1854, and 100 years later it became the first city in Illinois to adopt a council-manager form of government. Residents elect eight at-large council members and a mayor, who serve on a part-time basis. The city manager, a full-time professional, serves at the pleasure of the mayor and city council.

The current council members are Corey Dixon, Dustin Good, Rosamaria Martinez, Anthony Ortiz, Tish S. Powell, Carol J. Rauschenberger, F. John Steffen and Steven Thoren. Elgin's current mayor is David Kaptain and city manager is Rick Kozal.

The city council meets the second and fourth Wednesday of each month at 6:00 p.m. in the council chambers, located on the second floor of City Hall. Agenda and minutes are available on the city's website. Residents may attend in person at City Hall, watch the live video stream from the online newsroom, or view the replays on cable Channel 17.

The city is represented in the Illinois legislature by Representatives Anna Moeller (D), Dan Ugaste (R), and Fred Crespo (D) and Senators Cristina Castro (D) and Don DeWitte (R). In the US House of Representatives, Elgin is represented by Lauren Underwood (D), Delia Ramirez (D), and Raja Krishnamoorthi (D).

Elgin includes portions of Hanover Township in Cook County and Elgin Township, Plato Township, Rutland Township, Dundee Township, and Campton Township in Kane County. Elgin Township is governed by a supervisor (Kenneth C. Bruderle), highway commissioner (Jason Krabbe), assessor (Steven P. Surnicki), clerk (Karen Dowling) and four trustees (Mark Bialek, Alejandro Lopez, Janet Rogalla and Eric Stare) elected to four-year terms.

Elgin Fire Department has 133 sworn firefighters and seven fire stations. The front-line fire apparatus consists of four Advanced Life Support (ALS) fire engines, three ALS Quints, five ALS ambulances, two boats, a rescue raft, and a Battalion Chief, along with several vehicles used for inspections and other official business.

== Education ==
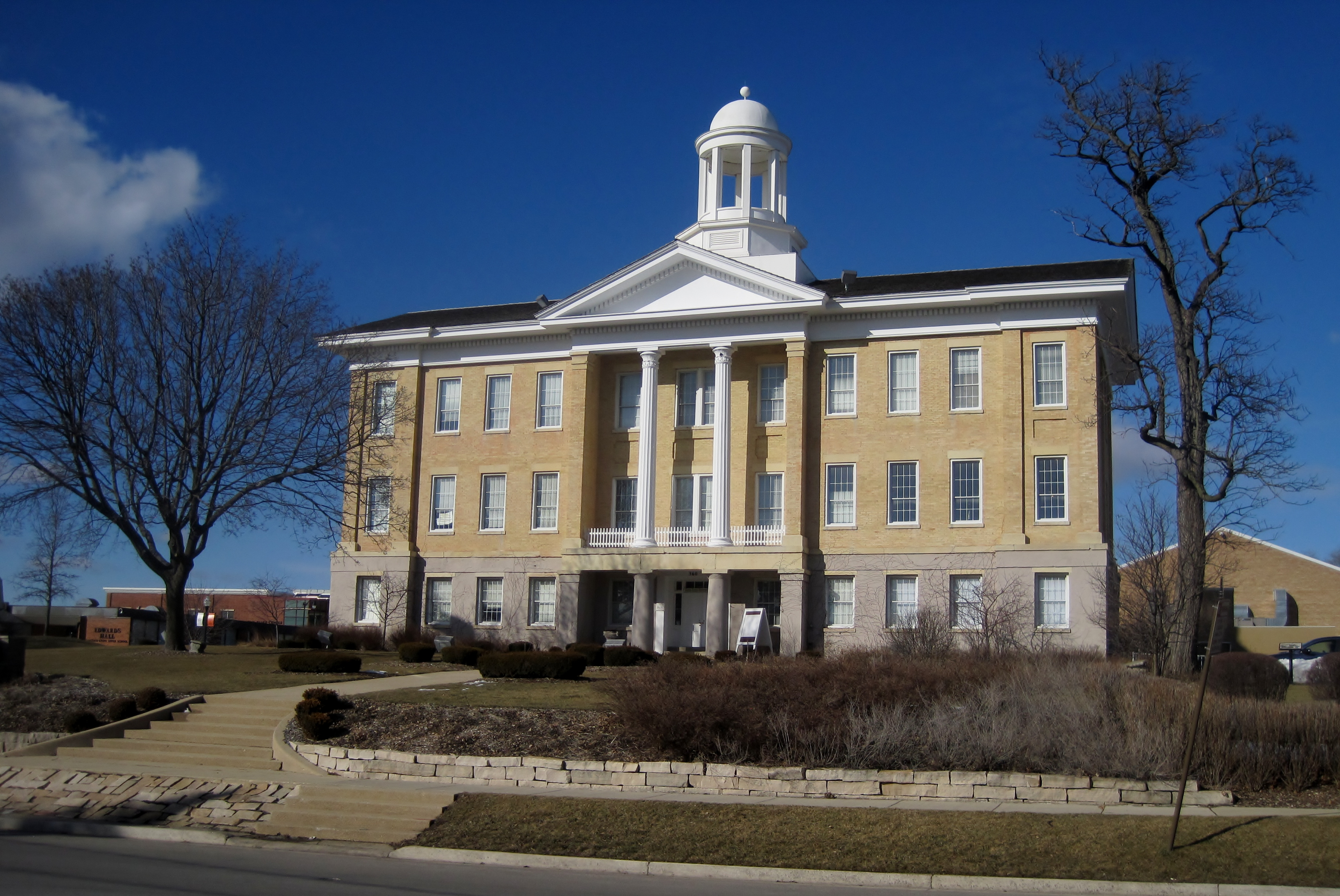
Elgin Academy

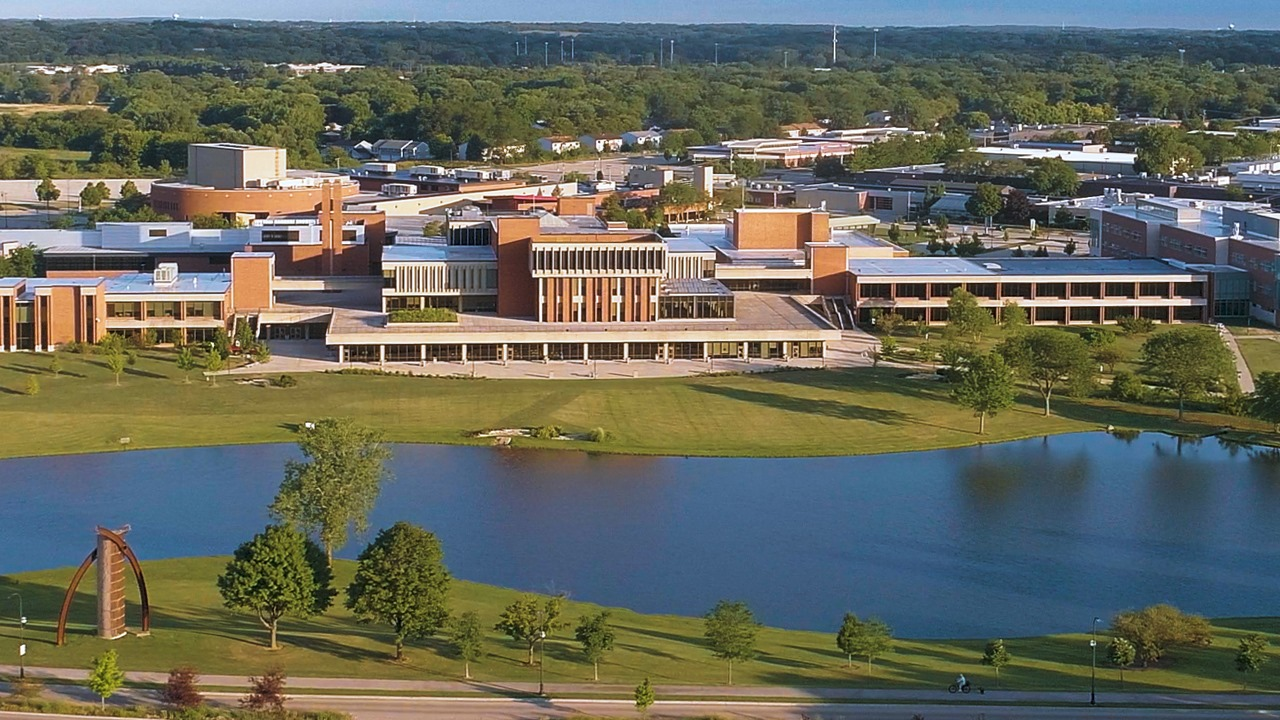
The campus of Elgin Community College

Five public school districts and 18 private schools serve Elgin.

=== K–12 public ===
- Elgin Area School District U46 is Elgin-based, and serves most of Elgin. U-46 is the second largest school district in Illinois, serves an area of 90 square miles (230 km^{2}) in Cook, DuPage and Kane Counties. Almost 40,000 children of school age are in its area. Elgin's two public high schools include Elgin High School and Larkin High School. Elgin has one K-8 publicly funded charter school: Elgin Math and Science Academy Charter School.
- Community Unit School District 301—Burlington-based, serves some western portions of Elgin
- Community Unit School District 300—Carpentersville-based, serves some northwestern portions of Elgin
- Community Unit School District 303—St. Charles-based, serves some southwestern portions of Elgin

=== K–12 private ===
Private schools include:

- Harvest Christian Academy
- The Einstein Academy
- Good Shepherd Lutheran Preschool
- Northwest Baptist Academy
- St. Edward Central Catholic High School
- St. John's Lutheran School and Preschool
- St. Edwards Preparatory Catholic School
- St. Thomas More Catholic Elementary School
- Westminster Christian School
- St. Mary's Catholic School

=== Accredited colleges and universities ===
- Elgin Community College serves the district #509 communities of St. Charles, Burlington, South Elgin, Wayne, Bartlett, Algonquin, Dundee, Hampshire and smaller towns, and was one of the fastest-growing community colleges in the state.
- Judson University, an accredited, four-year liberal arts American Baptist college, sits on the banks of the Fox River on the city's northwest side. Judson features graduate programs in architecture, education, Clinical Mental Health Counseling, Human Services Administration, Organizational Leadership, Business Administration, Leadership in Ministry and the Doctor of Education in Literacy programs.
- National Louis University, an accredited private non-profit undergraduate and graduate institution of higher learning, in colleges of education, arts and sciences, and business and management.

== Transportation ==
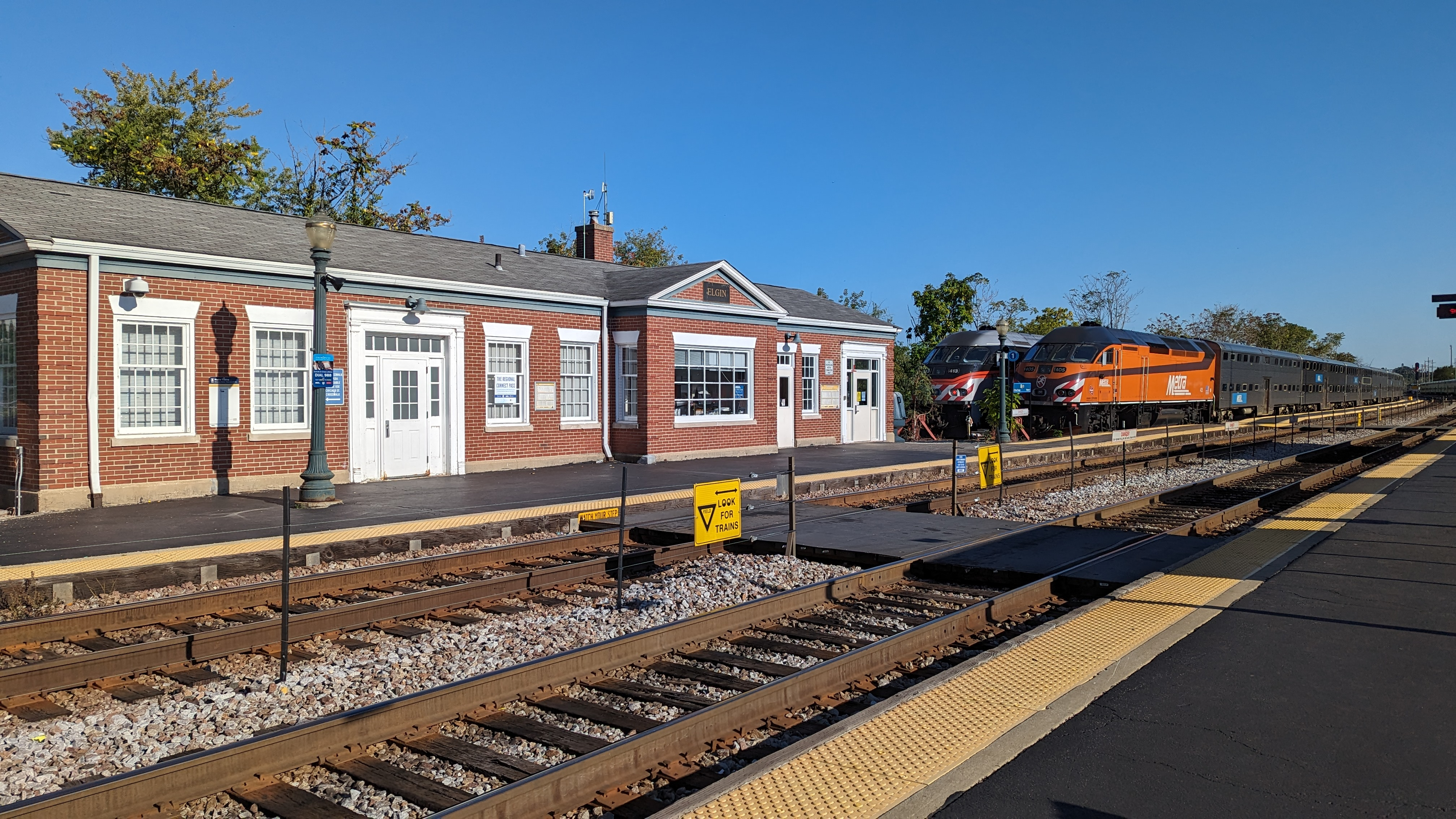
Elgin station

=== Metra ===
Elgin has three stations on Metra's Milwaukee District West Line, which provides daily rail service between Elgin and Chicago Union Station): National Street, Elgin, and Big Timber Road. Big Timber Road is the western terminus of this service; however, Big Timber is not serviced by the Metra on weekends or major U.S. holidays, as trains terminate in Elgin on those days.

The Chicago & North Western had a line to Freeport which ran through Elgin, now cut back to Rockford and operated by Union Pacific.

Elgin used to have a streetcar system, operated by the Aurora, Elgin and Fox River Electric Company. Additionally, Elgin was served by several interurban lines. The most prominent of these was the Chicago Aurora and Elgin Railroad which provided frequent service into Chicago. There was also the Elgin and Belvidere Electric Company.

=== Pace ===
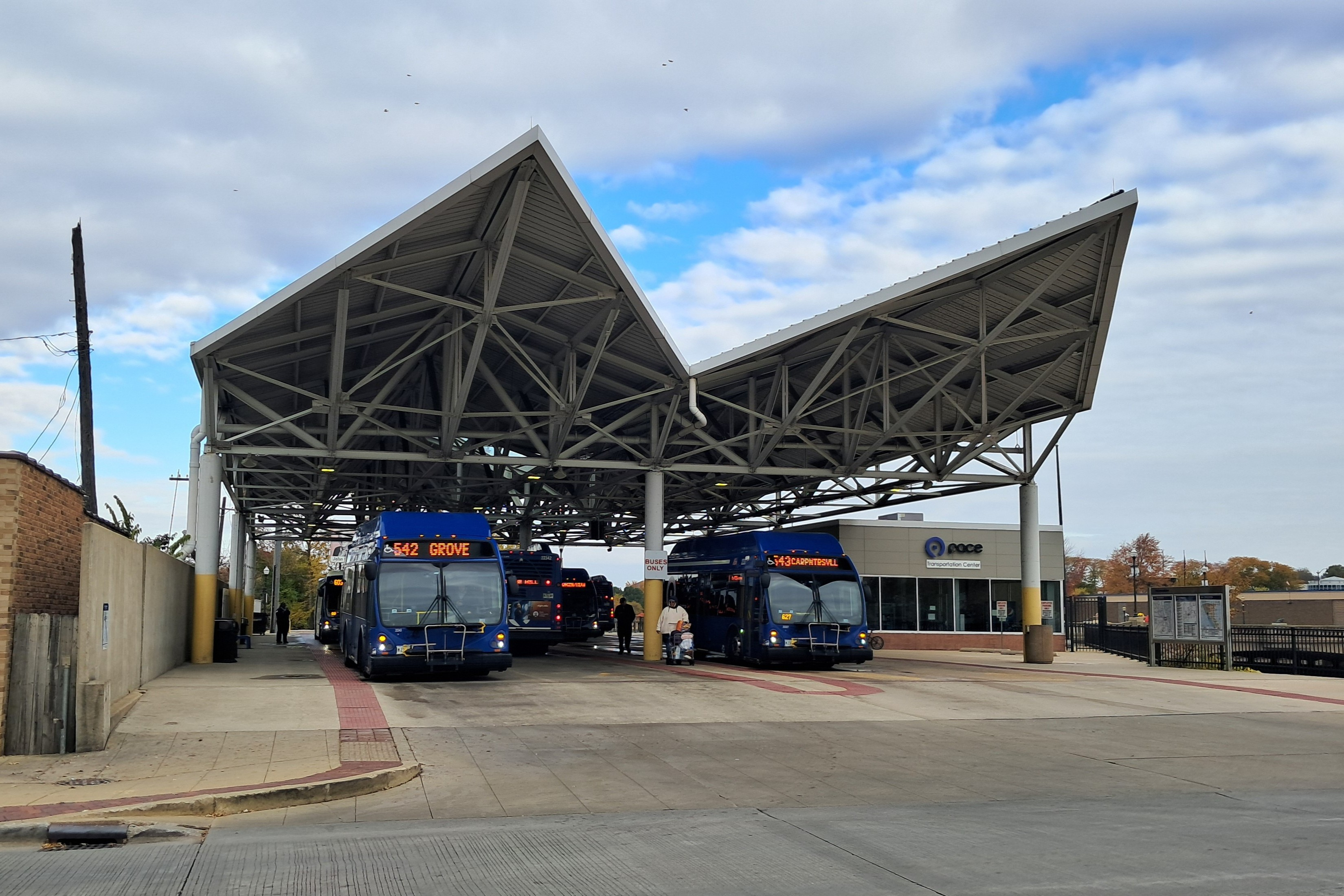
Pace buses at Elgin Transportation Center

Local bus service is provided by Pace (the Suburban bus provider of the Northeastern Illinois Regional Transportation Authority). Pace operates about a dozen bus routes in the city with service running Monday through Saturday. Most of the routes terminate at the Elgin Transportation Center located at 102 West Chicago Street in downtown. Routes generally run every half hour and meet up at the terminal at the same time to provide convenient transferring. Several routes also travel out of Elgin to other nearby suburbs, such as Carpentersville, West Dundee (Spring Hill Mall), Schaumburg (Woodfield Mall), and St. Charles (and connecting bus service to Aurora and Geneva).

Pace operates an express route between Elgin and the Rosemont station on the Blue Line. The service operates along I-90. Access to the bus route is via the Elgin Transportation Center, the Randall Road park and ride lot, and the IL-25 park and ride lot.

=== Major highways ===
Major highways in Elgin include:

Interstate Highways
Interstate 90

US Highways
U.S. 20

Illinois Highways
Illinois Route 19
Illinois Route 25
Illinois Route 31
Illinois Route 47
Illinois Route 58
Illinois Route 59
Illinois Route 72
Randall Road

== Notable people ==
Notable people of Elgin include the following:

- Brandon Johnson, is currently serving as the 57th Mayor of Chicago (2023); Cook County Board Commissioner (2018–2023)
- Max Adler, vice-president of Sears & Roebuck; benefactor of Adler Planetarium
- Bruce Boxleitner, actor
- Harry Chamberlin, U.S. Army brigadier general and Olympic medalist in equestrian events
- Paul Flory, chemist; Nobel Prize winner (1974)
- Eugenia St. John Mann, President, Illinois State WCTU; President, Kansas Equal Suffrage Association
- Jessica Mink, astronomer; co-discoverer of the rings around the planet Uranus
- Earl "Madman" Muntz, marketer, car stereo and 4-track cartridge pioneer
- James Roche, chairman of General Motors
- Wade Schaaf, dancer and choreographer
- Tom Shales, journalist; Pulitzer Prize winner (1988)
- Jim Gaffigan, comedian and actor

== Commemorative coin ==
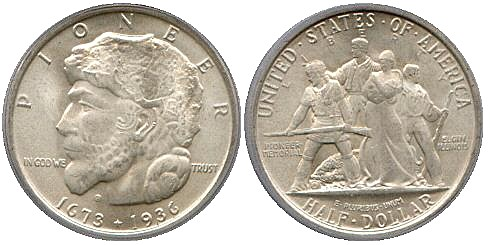
Elgin, Illinois, Centennial half dollar

In 1936, a commemorative silver half dollar was issued by the United States Mint commemorating the centennial of Elgin. The coin was meant to raise money for the pioneer family memorial proposed by Elgin sculptor Trygve Rovelstad, and sold for $1.50. The obverse features the profile of a pioneer with the dates 1673 * 1936, while the reverse features a pioneer family; both images are based on a centennial "Pioneer Medal" made by Rovelstad. The date 1673 was in reference to the expedition of Louis Jolliet and Jacques Marquette, despite the fact that their journey took them nowhere near the future site of Elgin.

The coin did not prove to be a popular success, probably because of the Great Depression and the great variety of commemorative coins being issued at the time. Five thousand of the 25,000 coins initially minted were unsold and melted down by the mint. Rovelstad's pioneer statue was not installed until 2001.

== In popular culture ==
=== In film ===
- Scenes from the film Four Friends (1981) were shot in the west side neighborhood just above the Woodruff and Edwards foundry.
- The movie Pretty in Pink (1986) was said to take place in Elgin.
- Part of the comedy film Dennis the Menace (1993) was set in Elgin.
- The Elgin Mental Health Center appears in the movie Primal Fear (1996).
- A scene in the suspense/thriller film Contagion (2011) was filmed in Elgin's Sherman Hospital.
- Parts of the horror film Plastic (2011) were shot in Elgin.
- A scene in the film A Nightmare on Elm Street (2010) was shot in Elgin's Bluff City Cemetery.
- Purge Feed footage depicts Elgin in The Purge (2013).

=== In television ===
- The exterior of the home in the television series Grace Under Fire was on Elgin's east side at 445 DuPage Street.
- In "Unearthed", an episode of the television series Prison Break, Dr. Sara Tancredi stayed at a motel in Elgin.
- The television series Roseanne was set in the fictional town of Lanford but was modeled after Elgin. At one point, Jackie attends a trucking school in Elgin. In the episode "Crime and Punishment", Roseanne offers to take Jackie to the hospital in Elgin.
- Wyatt Cenac's Problem Areas featured the Elgin Police Department's community policing strategies in its episode "Energy Problems, Millennial Problems, Community Policing Problems" which aired on April 27, 2018.
- The NBC series Superstore mentions Elgin.
