= Kane County, Illinois =

County in Illinois, United States

- County
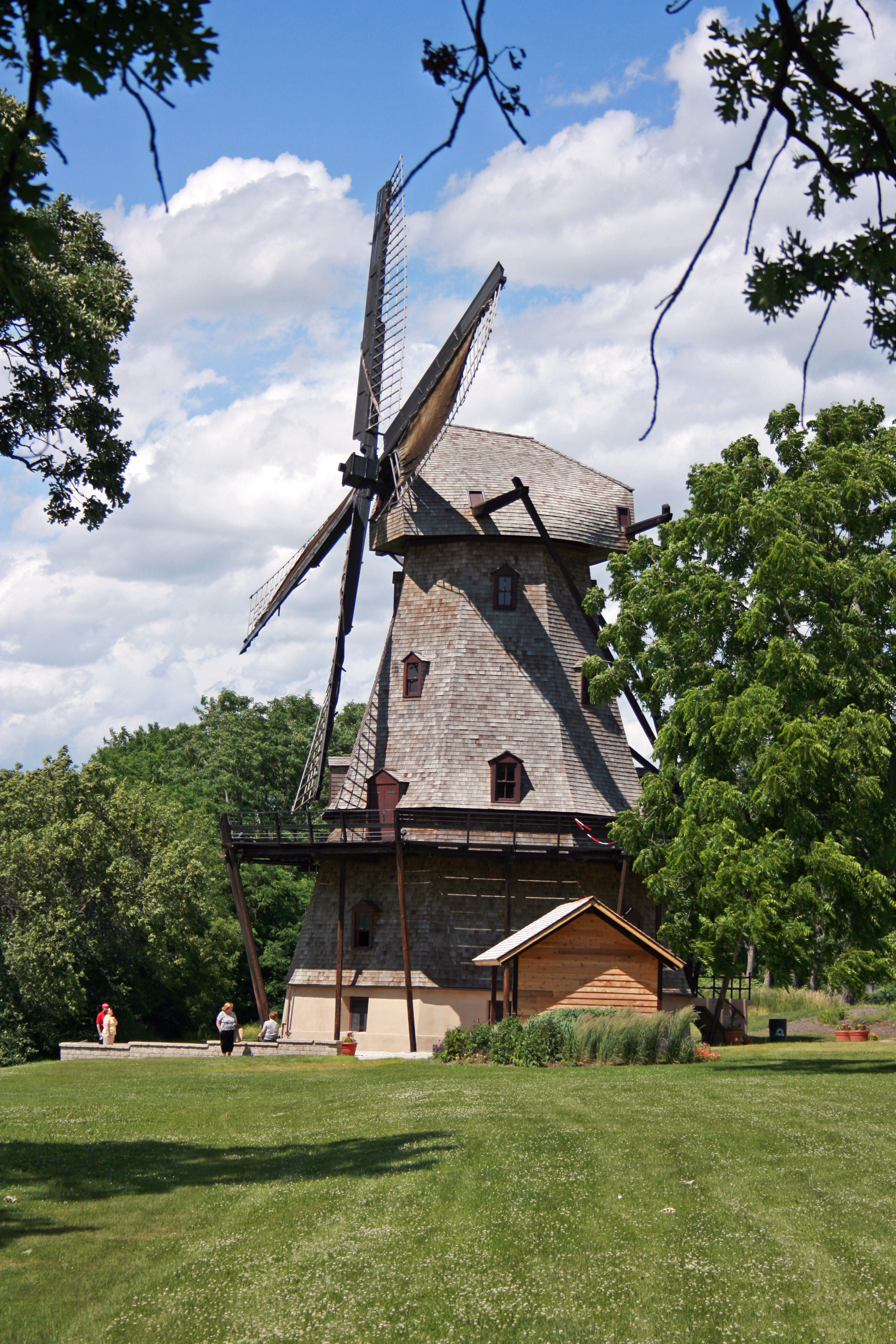
- The Fabyan Windmill in Geneva is on the National Register of Historic Places in Kane County, Illinois.

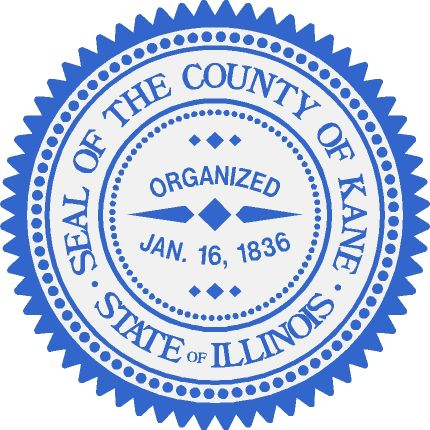
- Flag Seal

- Location within the U.S. state of Illinois
- Coordinates: 41°57′N 88°26′W
- Country: United States
- State: Illinois
- Founded: January 16, 1836
- Named for: Elias Kane
- Seat: Geneva
- Largest city: Aurora

Area
  - Total: 524 sq mi (1,360 km^{2})
  - Land: 520 sq mi (1,300 km^{2})
  - Water: 4.1 sq mi (11 km^{2}) 0.8%

Population (2020)
  - Total: 516,522
  - Estimate (2025): 525,757 ▲
  - Density: 990/sq mi (380/km^{2})
- Time zone: UTC−6 (Central)
  - Summer (DST): UTC−5 (CDT)
- Congressional districts: 8th, 11th, 14th
- Website: www.kanecountyil.gov

Kane County is a county in the U.S. state of Illinois. According to the 2020 census, it has a population of 516,522, making it the fifth-most populous county in Illinois. Its county seat is Geneva, and its largest city is Aurora. Kane County is one of the collar counties of the metropolitan statistical area designated "Chicago–Naperville–Elgin, IL–IN–WI" by the US census.

== History ==
Kane County was formed out of LaSalle County in 1836. The county was named in honor of Elias Kane, a United States senator and the first secretary of state of Illinois.

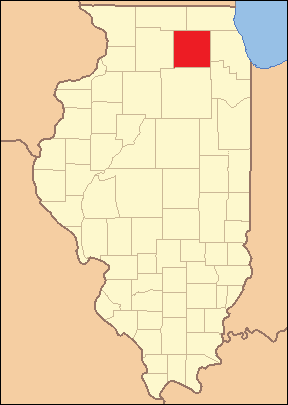
Kane County from the time of its creation to 1837, when DeKalb County was split off

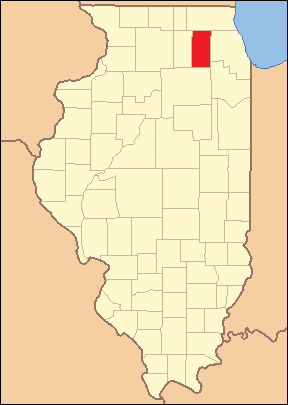
Kane County between 1837 and 1841

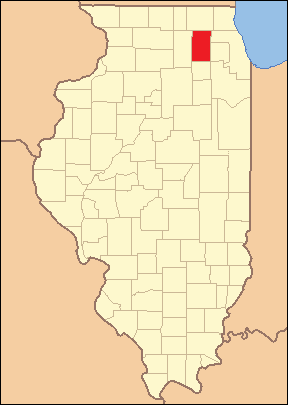
Kane County in 1841, reduced to its present size

== Geography ==
According to the U.S. Census Bureau, the county's area was 524 square miles (1,360 km^{2}), of which 520 square miles (1,300 km^{2}) is land and 4.1 square miles (11 km^{2}) (0.8%) is water. Its largest cities are along the Fox River.

=== Climate ===
Geneva, Illinois

Climate chart (precipitation, max. and min. temperature)
J	F	M	A	M	J	J	A	S	O	N	D
1.6 29 10	1.5 35 16	2.6 46 26	3.9 59 36	3.9 71 46	4.3 81 56	4.4 84 61	4.4 82 58	3.5 75 50	2.7 63 38	3.2 47 28	2.4 34 16
- █ Average max. and min. temperatures in °F
- █ Precipitation totals in inches
- Source: The Weather Channel
Metric conversion
J	F	M	A	M	J	J	A	S	O	N	D
41 −2 −12	39 2 −9	65 8 −3	99 15 2	99 22 8	110 27 13	112 29 16	111 28 14	89 24 10	69 17 3	81 8 −2	61 1 −9
- █ Average max. and min. temperatures in °C
- █ Precipitation totals in mm

In recent years, average temperatures in the county seat of Geneva have ranged from a low of 10 °F (−12 °C) in January to a high of 84 °F (29 °C) in July, although a record low of −26 °F (−32 °C) was recorded in January 1985 and a record high of 111 °F (44 °C) was recorded in July 1936. The average monthly precipitation ranged from 1.52 inches (39 mm) in February to 4.39 inches (112 mm) in July.

== Parks and recreation ==
- Deicke Park
- Fox River Trail
- Great Western Trail
- Illinois Prairie Path
- James "Pate" Philip State Park

=== Forest preserves ===
Notable forest preserves include:

- Fabyan Windmill
- Hampshire Forest Preserve
- Raceway Woods

== Demographics ==
Historical population
Census	Pop.	Note	%±
1840	6,501		—
1850	16,703		156.9%
1860	30,062		80.0%
1870	39,091		30.0%
1880	44,939		15.0%
1890	65,061		44.8%
1900	78,792		21.1%
1910	91,862		16.6%
1920	99,499		8.3%
1930	125,327		26.0%
1940	130,206		3.9%
1950	150,388		15.5%
1960	208,246		38.5%
1970	251,005		20.5%
1980	278,405		10.9%
1990	317,471		14.0%
2000	404,119		27.3%
2010	515,269		27.5%
2020	516,522		0.2%
2025 (est.)	525,757	▲	1.8%
U.S. Decennial Census; 1790–1960 1900–1990; 1990–2000 2010–2019

2000 census age pyramid for Kane County

=== 2020 census ===
As of the 2020 census, the county had a population of 516,522, the median age was 38.3 years, 24.7% of residents were under the age of 18, and 14.7% of residents were 65 years of age or older. For every 100 females there were 98.0 males overall and 95.9 males for every 100 females age 18 and over.

The racial makeup of the county was 60.0% White, 5.3% Black or African American, 1.4% American Indian and Alaska Native, 4.2% Asian, <0.1% Native Hawaiian and Pacific Islander, 16.2% from some other race, and 12.9% from two or more races. Hispanic or Latino residents of any race comprised 32.8% of the population.

96.0% of residents lived in urban areas, while 4.0% lived in rural areas.

There were 180,374 households in the county, of which 36.2% had children under the age of 18 living in them. Of all households, 55.4% were married-couple households, 15.2% were households with a male householder and no spouse or partner present, and 23.1% were households with a female householder and no spouse or partner present. About 21.9% of all households were made up of individuals and 9.7% had someone living alone who was 65 years of age or older.

There were 188,510 housing units, of which 4.3% were vacant. Among occupied housing units, 73.7% were owner-occupied and 26.3% were renter-occupied. The homeowner vacancy rate was 1.3% and the rental vacancy rate was 6.2%.

=== Racial and ethnic composition ===
Kane County, Illinois – Racial and ethnic composition Note: the US Census treats Hispanic/Latino as an ethnic category. This table excludes Latinos from the racial categories and assigns them to a separate category. Hispanics/Latinos may be of any race.
Race / Ethnicity (NH = Non-Hispanic)	Pop 1980	Pop 1990	Pop 2000	Pop 2010	Pop 2020	% 1980	% 1990	% 2000	% 2010	% 2020
White alone (NH)	235,709	250,551	273,390	304,051	282,307	84.66%	78.92%	67.65%	59.01%	54.66%
Black or African American alone (NH)	13,435	18,353	22,477	27,819	26,239	4.83%	5.78%	5.56%	5.40%	5.08%
Native American or Alaska Native alone (NH)	460	497	536	591	514	0.17%	0.16%	0.13%	0.11%	0.10%
Asian alone (NH)	1,694	4,227	7,142	17,505	21,191	0.61%	1.33%	1.77%	3.40%	4.10%
Native Hawaiian or Pacific Islander alone (NH)	x	x	57	130	115	x	x	0.01%	0.03%	0.02%
Other race alone (NH)	989	308	338	522	1,521	0.36%	0.10%	0.08%	0.10%	0.29%
Mixed race or Multiracial (NH)	x	x	4,255	6,261	15,040	x	x	1.05%	1.22%	2.91%
Hispanic or Latino (any race)	26,118	43,535	95,924	158,390	169,595	9.38%	13.71%	23.74%	30.74%	32.83%
Total	278,405	317,471	404,119	515,269	516,522	100.00%	100.00%	100.00%	100.00%	100.00%

==== Racial / Ethnic Profile of places in Kane County, Illinois (2020 census) ====
Racial / Ethnic Profile of places in Kane County, Illinois (2020 Census)
Following is a table of towns and census designated places in Kane County, Illinois. Data for the United States (with and without Puerto Rico), the state of Illinois, and Kane County itself have been included for comparison purposes.
The majority racial/ethnic group is coded per the key below. Communities that extend into and adjacent county or counties are delineated with a ‡ followed by an accompanying explanatory note. The full population of each community has been tabulated including the population in adjacent counties.

Majority minority with no dominant group
Majority White
Majority Black
Majority Hispanic
Majority Asian

Racial and ethnic composition of places in Kane County, Illinois (2020 Census) (NH = Non-Hispanic) Note: the US Census treats Hispanic/Latino as an ethnic category. This table excludes Latinos from the racial categories and assigns them to a separate category. Hispanics/Latinos may be of any race.
Place	Designation	Total Population	White alone (NH)	%	Black or African American alone (NH)	%	Native American or Alaska Native alone (NH)	%	Asian alone (NH)	%	Pacific Islander alone (NH)	%	Other race alone (NH)	%	Mixed race or Multiracial (NH)	%	Hispanic or Latino (any race)	%
United States of America (50 states and D.C.)	x	331,449,281	191,697,647	57.84%	39,940,338	12.05%	2,251,699	0.68%	19,618,719	5.92%	622,018	0.19%	1,689,833	0.51%	13,548,983	4.09%	62,080,044	18.73%
United States of America (50 states, D.C., and Puerto Rico)	x	334,735,155	191,722,195	57.28%	39,944,624	11.93%	2,252,011	0.67%	19,621,465	5.86%	622,109	0.19%	1,692,341	0.51%	13,551,323	4.05%	65,329,087	19.52%
Illinois	State	12,812,508	7,472,751	58.32%	1,775,612	13.86%	16,561	0.13%	747,280	5.83%	2,959	0.02%	45,080	0.35%	414,855	3.24%	2,337,410	18.24%
Kane County	County	516,522	282,307	54.66%	26,239	5.08%	514	0.10%	21,191	4.10%	115	0.02%	1,521	0.29%	15,040	2.91%	169,595	32.83%
Aurora ‡	City	180,542	61,017	33.80%	18,930	10.49%	207	0.11%	19,659	10.89%	61	0.03%	655	0.36%	5,032	2.79%	74,981	41.53%
Batavia ‡	City	26,098	21,479	82.30%	608	2.33%	11	0.04%	583	2.23%	2	0.01%	77	0.30%	944	3.62%	2,394	9.17%
Elgin ‡	City	114,797	42,261	36.81%	7,207	6.28%	150	0.13%	7,285	6.35%	27	0.02%	392	0.34%	3,015	2.63%	54,460	47.44%
Geneva	City	21,393	18,392	85.97%	128	0.60%	10	0.05%	485	2.27%	3	0.01%	55	0.26%	758	3.54%	1,562	7.30%
St. Charles ‡	City	33,081	26,099	78.89%	562	1.70%	25	0.08%	1,440	4.35%	4	0.01%	102	0.31%	1,125	3.40%	3,724	11.26%
Algonquin ‡	Village	29,700	22,327	75.18%	704	2.37%	27	0.09%	2,143	7.22%	7	0.02%	85	0.29%	1,048	3.53%	3,359	11.31%
Barrington Hills ‡	Village	4,114	3,369	81.89%	39	0.95%	4	0.10%	348	8.46%	0	0.00%	18	0.44%	124	3.01%	212	5.15%
Bartlett ‡	Village	41,105	26,377	64.17%	995	2.42%	31	0.08%	7,345	17.87%	6	0.01%	95	0.23%	1,309	3.18%	4,947	12.04%
Big Rock	Village	1,104	984	89.13%	3	0.27%	1	0.09%	5	0.45%	0	0.00%	0	0.00%	37	3.35%	74	6.70%
Burlington	Village	535	460	85.98%	1	0.19%	0	0.00%	1	0.19%	0	0.00%	1	0.19%	23	4.30%	49	9.16%
Campton Hills	Village	10,885	9,480	87.09%	91	0.84%	6	0.06%	257	2.36%	0	0.00%	22	0.20%	413	3.79%	616	5.66%
Carpentersville	Village	37,983	11,477	30.22%	2,152	5.67%	40	0.11%	1,971	5.19%	3	0.01%	126	0.33%	843	2.22%	21,371	56.26%
East Dundee ‡	Village	3,152	2,241	71.10%	177	5.62%	0	0.00%	74	2.35%	0	0.00%	4	0.13%	86	2.73%	570	18.08%
Elburn	Village	6,175	5,324	86.22%	50	0.81%	0	0.00%	119	1.93%	0	0.00%	7	0.11%	196	3.17%	479	7.76%
Gilberts	Village	8,366	5,284	63.16%	257	3.07%	4	0.05%	1,065	12.73%	1	0.01%	33	0.39%	310	3.71%	1,412	16.88%
Hampshire	Village	7,667	5,832	76.07%	177	2.31%	8	0.10%	169	2.20%	4	0.05%	16	0.21%	248	3.23%	1,213	15.82%
Hoffman Estates ‡	Village	52,530	26,014	49.52%	2,472	4.71%	69	0.13%	13,733	26.14%	2	0.00%	183	0.35%	1,579	3.01%	8,478	16.14%
Huntley ‡	Village	27,740	22,223	80.11%	450	1.62%	24	0.09%	1,516	5.47%	1	0.00%	60	0.22%	883	3.18%	2,583	9.31%
Kaneville	Village	452	386	85.40%	2	0.44%	1	0.22%	8	1.77%	0	0.00%	4	0.88%	16	3.54%	35	7.74%
Lily Lake	Village	1,032	902	87.40%	19	1.84%	1	0.10%	7	0.68%	0	0.00%	6	0.58%	34	3.29%	63	6.10%
Maple Park ‡	Village	1,433	1,259	87.86%	2	0.14%	0	0.00%	10	0.70%	0	0.00%	6	0.42%	42	2.93%	114	7.96%
Montgomery ‡	Village	20,262	9,929	49.00%	1,901	9.38%	11	0.05%	640	3.16%	4	0.02%	77	0.38%	832	4.11%	6,868	33.90%
North Aurora	Village	18,261	12,191	66.76%	1,010	5.53%	11	0.06%	910	4.98%	8	0.04%	48	0.26%	577	3.16%	3,506	19.20%
Pingree Grove	Village	4,532	3,050	67.30%	104	2.29%	1	0.02%	294	6.49%	1	0.02%	5	0.11%	81	1.79%	996	21.98%
Sleepy Hollow	Village	3,214	2,603	80.99%	52	1.62%	1	0.03%	72	2.24%	0	0.00%	9	0.28%	89	2.77%	388	12.07%
South Elgin	Village	23,865	14,935	62.58%	821	3.44%	14	0.06%	2,117	8.87%	5	0.02%	85	0.36%	926	3.88%	4,962	20.79%
Sugar Grove	Village	9,278	7,778	83.83%	150	1.62%	10	0.11%	163	1.76%	1	0.01%	26	0.28%	343	3.70%	807	8.70%
Virgil	Village	289	257	88.93%	5	1.73%	3	1.04%	0	0.00%	0	0.00%	0	0.00%	4	1.38%	20	6.92%
Wayne ‡	Village	2,286	1,861	81.41%	15	0.66%	2	0.09%	167	7.31%	0	0.00%	11	0.48%	47	2.06%	183	8.01%
West Dundee	Village	7,686	5,461	71.05%	261	3.40%	9	0.12%	500	6.51%	0	0.00%	26	0.34%	270	3.51%	1,159	15.08%
Prestbury	CDP	1,657	1,456	87.87%	16	0.97%	1	0.06%	14	0.84%	0	0.00%	1	0.06%	49	2.96%	120	7.24%

=== 2010 census ===
As of the 2010 census, there were 515,269 people, 170,479 households, and 128,323 families residing in the county. The population density was 990.8 inhabitants per square mile (382.6/km^{2}). There were 182,047 housing units at an average density of 350.1 per square mile (135.2/km^{2}). The racial makeup of the county was 74.6% white, 5.7% black or African American, 3.5% Asian, 0.6% American Indian, 13.0% from other races, and 2.6% from two or more races. Those of Hispanic or Latino origin made up 30.7% of the population. In terms of ancestry, 24.3% were German, 13.0% were Irish, 7.9% were Polish, 7.4% were Italian, 7.1% were English, and 2.4% were American.

Of the 170,479 households, 42.3% had children under the age of 18 living with them, 59.2% were married couples living together, 11.0% had a female householder with no husband present, 24.7% were non-families, and 19.8% of all households were made up of individuals. The average household size was 2.98 and the average family size was 3.45. The median age was 34.5 years.

The median income for a household in the county was $67,767 and the median income for a family was $77,998. Males had a median income of $53,833 versus $39,206 for females. The per capita income for the county was $29,480. About 7.0% of families and 9.1% of the population were below the poverty line, including 13.5% of those under age 18 and 5.7% of those age 65 or over.

== Education ==
- Aurora University
- Elgin Community College
- Judson University
- Waubonsee Community College

== Infrastructure ==
=== Health care ===
There are several hospitals serving the county:

- Advocate Sherman Hospital, Elgin
- Northwestern Medicine Delnor Hospital, Geneva
- Presence Mercy Medical Center, Aurora
- Presence Saint Joseph Hospital, Elgin
- Rush-Copley Medical Center, Aurora

=== Transportation ===
==== Transit ====
- Metra
- BNSF Line
- Milwaukee District West Line
- Union Pacific West Line
- Pace
- Pace I-90 Express

==== Airport ====
- Aurora Municipal Airport

==== Major highways ====
Kane county has an extensive county highway system that includes federal, state and county maintained routes. During the years that the county was represented by Dennis Hastert it received many federal earmarks for highway improvements to respond to population growth. In addition, the county has entered into an agreement with the Illinois State Toll Highway Authority to operate a limited access toll bridge on the Longmeadow Parkway that is not connected to any other tollway.

- I-88 Toll / IL 110 (CKC)
- I-90
- US 20
- US 30
- US 34
- IL 19
- IL 25
- IL 31
- IL 38
- IL 47
- IL 56
- IL 58
- IL 62
- IL 64
- IL 68
- IL 72

== Communities ==
=== Cities ===
- Aurora (mostly)
- Batavia (mostly)
- Elgin (mostly)
- Geneva
- St. Charles (mostly)

=== Villages ===
- Algonquin (part)
- Barrington Hills (part)
- Bartlett (part)
- Big Rock
- Burlington
- Campton Hills
- Carpentersville
- East Dundee (mostly)
- Elburn
- Gilberts
- Hampshire
- Hoffman Estates (part)
- Huntley (part)
- Kaneville
- Lily Lake
- Maple Park (part)
- Montgomery (mostly)
- North Aurora
- Pingree Grove
- Sleepy Hollow
- South Elgin
- Sugar Grove
- Virgil
- Wayne (part)
- West Dundee

=== Census-designated place ===
- Prestbury

=== Other unincorporated communities ===
- Allens Corners
- Almora
- Bald Mound
- Bowes
- Five Island Park
- Freeman
- La Fox
- Mooseheart
- North Plato
- Nottingham Woods
- Plato Center
- Rainbow Hills
- Starks
- Thornwood
- Udina
- Valley View
- Wasco (former)

=== Townships ===
- Aurora Township
- Batavia Township
- Big Rock Township
- Blackberry Township
- Burlington Township
- Campton Township
- Dundee Township
- Elgin Township
- Geneva Township
- Hampshire Township
- Kaneville Township
- Plato Township
- Rutland Township
- St. Charles Township
- Sugar Grove Township
- Virgil Township

== Government ==
=== Kane County Board ===
Kane County services are overseen by a 24 member Board which is elected every two years. The Board's chair is elected every four years. The Board sets the County's budget. Corrine Michelle Pierog is the current County Board Chair. There are currently 16 Democrats and 8 Republicans on the Board.

In addition to the Board chair, there are nine county officeholders elected countywide every four years. These positions are the Auditor, Circuit Clerk, County Clerk, Coroner, Recorder, Regional Office of Education Superintendent, Sheriff, State's Attorney, and Treasurer.

=== Current elected officials ===
Kane County Board Members, 2022–2024
Party	District	Board Member	City/town
	Chair	Corinne Pierog	Batavia
	1	Myrna Molina	Aurora
	2	Dale Berman	North Aurora
	3	Anita Lewis	Aurora
	4	Mavis Bates	Aurora
	5	Bill Lenert	Sugar Grove
	6	Ron Ford	Aurora
	7	Monica Silva	Aurora
	8	Michelle Gumz	Aurora
	9	Gary Daughtery	Gilberts
	10	Bill Tarver	Batavia
	11	Leslie Juby	Geneva
	12	Bill Roth	St. Charles
	13	Michael Linder	St. Charles
	14	Mark Davoust	St. Charles
	15	David Young	Elgin
	16	Michael Kenyon	South Elgin
	17	Deborah Allan	Elgin
	18	Rick Williams	Geneva
	19	Mohammad "Mo" Iqbal	Elgin
	20	Cherryl Fritz Strathmann	Elgin
	21	Clifford Surges	Gilberts
	22	Verner (Vern) Tepe	Elgin
	23	Chris Kious	Algonquin
	24	Jarett Sanchez	Carpentersville

Countywide Officeholders, 2022–2024
Party	Office	Name	Party	Serving Until
	Kane County Clerk	John "Jack" A. Cunningham	Republican	2026
	Sheriff	Ron Hain	Democratic	2026
	Treasurer	Chris Lauzen	Republican	2026
	Board Chair	Corinne M. Pierog	Democratic	2024
	Circuit Clerk	Theresa Barreiro	Democratic	2024
	Auditor	Penny Wegman	Democratic	2024
	Coroner	L. Robert Russell	Republican	2024
	Recorder	Sandy Wegman	Republican	2024
	State's Attorney	Jamie Mosser	Democratic	2024

=== 16th Circuit ===
Kane County is coterminous with the 16th Judicial Circuit. The 16th Judicial Circuit is divided into four subcircuits. The first subcircuit consists of the majority of Aurora Township. The second subcircuit consists of most of Elgin and Dundee townships. The fourth subcircuit consists the tri-cities area of Batavia, Geneva, and Saint Charles. The third subcircuit consists of all territory not included in the other three subcircuits, which corresponds to an area of roughly the western two thirds of the county.

== Politics ==
As one of the Yankee-settled and prosperous suburban "collar counties", Kane County was a stronghold of the Free Soil Party in its first few elections, being one of nine Illinois counties to give a plurality to Martin van Buren in 1848. Kane County then unsurprisingly became solidly Republican for the century and a half following that party's formation. It voted for the GOP presidential nominee in every election between 1856 and 2004 except that of 1912 when the Republican Party was mortally divided and Progressive candidate Theodore Roosevelt carried the county with a majority of the vote over conservative incumbent William Howard Taft.

The gradual shift of the GOP towards white Southern Evangelicals, however, has led the generally moderate electorate of Kane and the other "collar counties" to trend towards the Democratic Party. In 2008, Senator Barack Obama became the first Democrat to carry Kane County since Franklin Pierce in 1852, and the first ever to win an absolute majority of the county's vote (the previous two Democratic winners, Pierce and James K. Polk in 1844 had both gained only pluralities due to strong Free Soil votes). Obama won a plurality in 2012, and Hillary Clinton improved upon Obama's showing to become the second Democrat to win a majority in 2016. In 2020, Joe Biden had the best performance ever by a Democrat in the county, even besting Obama's 2008 victory.

Kane County is represented in the United States House of Representatives by Democrats Bill Foster (11th District), Raja Krishnamoorthi (8th District), and Lauren Underwood (14th District).

United States presidential election results for Kane County, Illinois
Year	Republican		Democratic		Third party(ies)	
Year	No.	%	No.	%	No.	%
1892	7,977	53.80%	5,778	38.97%	1,072	7.23%
1896	12,133	69.94%	4,852	27.97%	362	2.09%
1900	12,031	67.55%	5,259	29.53%	521	2.93%
1904	12,638	75.64%	2,799	16.75%	1,271	7.61%
1908	12,840	70.29%	4,316	23.63%	1,111	6.08%
1912	2,415	12.67%	4,394	23.05%	12,257	64.29%
1916	23,868	67.71%	9,875	28.01%	1,506	4.27%
1920	26,832	82.82%	4,323	13.34%	1,243	3.84%
1924	32,717	76.34%	3,517	8.21%	6,624	15.46%
1928	38,236	69.94%	16,184	29.60%	253	0.46%
1932	32,934	56.15%	24,638	42.00%	1,084	1.85%
1936	33,491	52.55%	28,187	44.23%	2,051	3.22%
1940	41,949	61.77%	25,676	37.81%	289	0.43%
1944	38,689	62.16%	23,362	37.54%	185	0.30%
1948	39,284	64.41%	21,176	34.72%	532	0.87%
1952	50,801	67.78%	24,058	32.10%	96	0.13%
1956	56,009	72.82%	20,848	27.10%	59	0.08%
1960	55,389	63.84%	31,279	36.05%	93	0.11%
1964	46,391	53.27%	40,703	46.73%	0	0.00%
1968	54,144	61.94%	26,609	30.44%	6,667	7.63%
1972	64,546	69.87%	27,525	29.80%	306	0.33%
1976	59,275	62.15%	34,057	35.71%	2,042	2.14%
1980	64,106	61.77%	29,015	27.96%	10,663	10.27%
1984	72,655	69.09%	31,875	30.31%	629	0.60%
1988	66,283	64.10%	36,366	35.17%	763	0.74%
1992	55,684	43.52%	44,568	34.84%	27,686	21.64%
1996	54,375	47.41%	47,902	41.77%	12,416	10.83%
2000	76,996	54.45%	60,127	42.52%	4,282	3.03%
2004	92,065	55.03%	73,813	44.12%	1,419	0.85%
2008	83,963	43.42%	106,756	55.21%	2,644	1.37%
2012	88,335	48.61%	90,332	49.71%	3,058	1.68%
2016	82,734	41.43%	103,665	51.91%	13,288	6.65%
2020	96,775	41.74%	130,166	56.14%	4,935	2.13%
2024	99,260	44.18%	120,077	53.45%	5,323	2.37%

== See also ==
- Dundee Township Park District
- Fermilab
- Fox River (Illinois River tributary)
- National Register of Historic Places listings in Kane County, Illinois
- Tri-Cities (Illinois)

== Notable people ==
- Geneva, Illinois§Notable people
- Batavia, Illinois§Notable people
- St. Charles, Illinois§Notable people
- List of people from Elgin, Illinois
- List of people from Aurora, Illinois
- Carpentersville, Illinois§Notable residents
- East Dundee, Illinois§Notable residents
- Hampshire, Illinois§Notable people
- Kaneville, Illinois§Notable natives
- Montgomery, Illinois§Notable people
- Sugar Grove, Illinois§Notable people
- West Dundee, Illinois§Notable resident
