= List of people from Elgin, Illinois =

List of notable people from Elgin, Illinois

The following list includes notable people who were born in or have lived in Elgin, Illinois. For a similar list organized alphabetically by last name, see the category page: People from Elgin, Illinois.

== Authors and academics ==
- E.C. "Mike" Alft, historian, author, and former mayor of Elgin
- Nina Burleigh, journalist and author
- Paul Flory, chemist; Nobel Prize winner (1974)
- Lloyd Hall, chemist
- Donella Meadows, environmentalist
- Jessica Mink, astronomer; co-discoverer of the rings around Uranus
- John Platt, computer scientist
- Tom Shales, journalist; Pulitzer Prize winner (1988)
- Dwight Smith Young, physicist with the Manhattan Project
- Carleton Washburne, educator; author
- Helen Woodruff (1899–1980), art historian, manuscript scholar, curator, and educator

== Business and invention ==
- Max Adler, vice president of Sears & Roebuck; benefactor of the Adler Planetarium
- Lawrence B. Hamlin, marketer and purveyor of Hamlin's Wizard Oil
- Lysander Hamlin, co-originator of Hamlin's Wizard Oil with John Austen Hamlin
- James P. Liautaud, industrialist, inventor, and business theorist
- Earl "Madman" Muntz, marketer, car stereo and 4-track cartridge pioneer
- James Roche, chairman of General Motors

== Media and arts ==
- Dan Andriano, musician
- BarlowGirl, Christian rock band
- Joe Becker, musician
- Bruce Boxleitner, actor
- Josh Caterer, songwriter, musician, singer
- Citizen Way, Christian rock band
- Daniel de Marbelle, songwriter; wrote When They Ring Those Golden Bells
- Erik Foss, artist and curator
- Jim Gaffigan, comedian, actor, and author
- Mitzi Gaynor, actress and entertainer; lived in Elgin
- George Hamlin, opera singer; son of John Austin Hamlin
- John Austin Hamlin, magician
- Matt Hoffman, contestant on Big Brother 12
- Charles Ingalls, father of Laura Ingalls Wilder (Little House on the Prairie); lived in nearby Campton Township
- Laurence Kaptain, recording artist; Dean at the College of Music and Dramatic Arts, Louisiana State University
- William LeBaron, playwright and film producer
- Kevin Martin, musician
- Norman Mayell, musician (Sopwith Camel, Blue Cheer, Norman Greenbaum)
- Paleo (David Strackany), folk singer-songwriter
- Jane Peterson, painter and artist
- John Qualen, actor
- Courtney Reed, stage actress; originated the role of Jasmine in Aladdin on Broadway
- Marie Sidenius Zendt, singer

== Military ==
- Harry Chamberlin, U.S. Army brigadier general and Olympic medalist in equestrian events
- William Francis Lynch, American Civil War veteran and US Army brigadier general

== Politics and law ==
- Ray Barnhart, Texas state representative
- Robert L. Bergman (1948–2013), Illinois state representative
- DeGoy B. Ellis (1876–1949), Illinois state representative and lawyer
- Thomas W. Ferry (1827–1896), acting President Pro Tempore of the United States Senate and U.S. Senator
- Peter Fitzgerald, U.S. Senator from Illinois
- Barbara Giolitto, Illinois state representative
- Adam Neylon, Wisconsin state representative
- Jeanette Ward, member of the Wyoming House of Representatives; lived in Elgin until moving to Casper, Wyoming in 2021

== Sports ==
- Charlene Barnett (1928–1979), baseball player
- Earl Britton (1903–1973), football player
- Bethany Goldsmith (1927–2004), baseball player
- Harry Hanson (1896–1966), baseball player
- Hunkey Hines (1867–1928), baseball player
- Tony Kaufmann (1900–1982), baseball player
- Scott Kellar (born 1963), football player
- Ed McDonough (1886–1926), baseball player
- Lou North (1891–1974), baseball player
- Brian Oldfield (born 1945), Olympic shot putter
- David Otunga (born 1980), wrestler
- Erwin Renfer (1891–1957), baseball player
- Flynn Robinson (born 1941), basketball player
- Rick Short (born 1972), baseball player
- Roger Smithberg (born 1966), baseball player
- Ray Whipple (1893–1973), football player
