= Sugar Grove Township, Illinois =

Sugar Grove Township
- Township
- Location in Kane County

- Kane County's location in Illinois
- Coordinates: 41°46′09″N 88°25′48″W
- Country: United States
- State: Illinois
- County: Kane
- Established: November 6, 1849

Area
  - Total: 35.42 sq mi (91.7 km^{2})
  - Land: 35.24 sq mi (91.3 km^{2})
  - Water: 0.18 sq mi (0.47 km^{2}) 0.50%
- Elevation: 699 ft (213 m)

Population (2020)
  - Total: 20,684
  - Density: 586.9/sq mi (226.6/km^{2})
- Time zone: UTC-6 (CST)
  - Summer (DST): UTC-5 (CDT)
- ZIP codes: 60506, 60511, 60538, 60542, 60554
- FIPS code: 17-089-73404
- Website: www.townshipofsugargrove.com

Sugar Grove Township is one of sixteen townships in Kane County, Illinois, USA. As of the 2020 census, its population was 20,684 and it contained 7,484 housing units. The Sugar Grove campus of Waubonsee Community College is within this township.

== Geography ==
According to the 2021 census gazetteer files, Sugar Grove Township has a total area of 35.42 square miles (91.74 km^{2}), of which 35.24 square miles (91.27 km^{2}) (or 99.50%) is land and 0.18 square miles (0.47 km^{2}) (or 0.50%) is water. The township encompasses an area that extends to Orchard Road to the east, Baseline Road (Route 30) to the south, Dugan Road to the west and Seavey Road/Tanner Road to the north.

== Demographics ==
As of the 2020 census there were 20,684 people, 7,295 households, and 5,455 families residing in the township. The population density was 583.98 inhabitants per square mile (225.48/km^{2}). There were 7,484 housing units at an average density of 211.30 per square mile (81.58/km^{2}). The racial makeup of the township was 76.15% White, 4.80% African American, 0.53% Native American, 2.92% Asian, 0.03% Pacific Islander, 4.82% from other races, and 10.74% from two or more races. Hispanic or Latino of any race were 14.46% of the population.

There were 7,295 households, out of which 36.90% had children under the age of 18 living with them, 65.68% were married couples living together, 4.84% had a female householder with no spouse present, and 25.22% were non-families. 21.80% of all households were made up of individuals, and 8.50% had someone living alone who was 65 years of age or older. The average household size was 2.84 and the average family size was 3.39.

The township's age distribution consisted of 25.4% under the age of 18, 8.8% from 18 to 24, 23.1% from 25 to 44, 26.8% from 45 to 64, and 15.8% who were 65 years of age or older. The median age was 40.5 years. For every 100 females, there were 104.1 males. For every 100 females age 18 and over, there were 98.4 males.

The median income for a household in the township was $114,854, and the median income for a family was $125,853. Males had a median income of $74,106 versus $45,409 for females. The per capita income for the township was $46,887. About 2.0% of families and 2.7% of the population were below the poverty line, including 1.2% of those under age 18 and 10.1% of those age 65 or over.

Historical population
Census	Pop.	Note	%±
2000	9,595		—
2010	19,618		104.5%
2020	20,684		5.4%
U.S. Decennial Census

== Government ==
The town hall is located at 70 West First Street Sugar Grove, IL. The township is led by an elected supervisor and four trustees. The other elected officials are the assessor, clerk and highway commissioner.

The Sugar Grove Library District now covers both Sugar Grove and Blackberry Townships.

=== Cities, towns, villages ===
- Aurora (partial)
- Big Rock (eastern edge)
- Montgomery (partial)
- North Aurora (partial)
- Sugar Grove (majority)

=== Other communities ===
- Prestbury

=== Cemeteries ===
The township contains these two cemeteries: Jericho and Sugar Grove.

=== Airports and landing strips ===
- Aurora Municipal Airport

== School districts ==
- Hinckley-Big Rock Community Unit School District 429
- Kaneland Community Unit School District 302
- West Aurora Public School District 129
- Yorkville Community Unit School District 115

== Political districts ==
- Illinois's 14th congressional district
- State House District 50
- State Senate District 25
