= Big Rock Township =

Big Rock Township may refer to:

- Big Rock Township, Pulaski County, Arkansas
- Big Rock Township, Kane County, Illinois
