= Sugar Grove, Illinois =

- Village
- Location of Sugar Grove in Kane County, Illinois
- Coordinates: 41°46′N 88°27′W
- Country: United States
- State: Illinois
- County: Kane
- Townships: Big Rock, Blackberry, Sugar Grove,
- Incorporated: 1957

Government
  - Type: Council-Manager government
  - President: Susan Stillwell

Area
  - Total: 10.56 sq mi (27.35 km^{2})
  - Land: 10.54 sq mi (27.31 km^{2})
  - Water: 0.015 sq mi (0.04 km^{2}) 0.19%

Population (2020)
  - Total: 9,278
  - Density: 879.9/sq mi (339.75/km^{2})
- ZIP code: 60554
- Area code(s): 630, 331
- Geocode: 73391
- FIPS code: 17-73391
- Website: sugargroveil.gov

Sugar Grove is a village in Kane County, Illinois, United States. The population at the 2020 census was 9,278.

== Geography ==
Sugar Grove is located in southern Kane County at 41°46′N 88°27′W (41.772529, -88.442374). It is bordered to the east by the city of Aurora and to the west by the village of Big Rock. Sugar Grove nearly encircles the unincorporated community of Prestbury, and the city of Yorkville is to the south. Downtown Chicago is 46 miles (74 km) to the east and Rockford is approximately 67 miles (108 km) to the northwest.

According to the 2021 census gazetteer files, Sugar Grove has a total area of 10.56 square miles (27.35 km^{2}), of which 10.54 square miles (27.30 km^{2}) (or 99.86%) is land and 0.02 square miles (0.05 km^{2}) (or 0.14%) is water.

Sugar Grove is located within a band of heavy growth on the western edge of the Chicago metropolitan area, stretching from approximately the Huntley area in McHenry County to the Joliet area in Will County. Sugar Grove adopted its first comprehensive land use plan on January 12, 1981.

== Demographics ==
Historical population
Census	Pop.	Note	%±
1960	326		—
1970	1,230		277.3%
1980	1,366		11.1%
1990	2,005		46.8%
2000	3,909		95.0%
2010	8,997		130.2%
2020	9,278		3.1%
U.S. Decennial Census

=== Racial and ethnic composition ===
Sugar Grove village, Illinois – Racial and ethnic composition Note: the US Census treats Hispanic/Latino as an ethnic category. This table excludes Latinos from the racial categories and assigns them to a separate category. Hispanics/Latinos may be of any race.
Race / Ethnicity (NH = Non-Hispanic)	Pop 2000	Pop 2010	Pop 2020	% 2000	% 2010	% 2020
White alone (NH)	3,626	7,881	7,778	92.76%	87.60%	83.83%
Black or African American alone (NH)	54	137	150	1.38%	1.52%	1.62%
Native American or Alaska Native alone (NH)	1	12	10	0.03%	0.13%	0.11%
Asian alone (NH)	20	153	163	0.51%	1.70%	1.76%
Native Hawaiian or Pacific Islander alone (NH)	0	0	1	0.00%	0.00%	0.01%
Other race alone (NH)	5	9	26	0.13%	0.10%	0.28%
Mixed race or Multiracial (NH)	30	107	343	0.77%	1.19%	3.70%
Hispanic or Latino (any race)	173	698	807	4.43%	7.76%	8.70%
Total	3,909	8,997	9,278	100.00%	100.00%	100.00%

=== 2020 census ===
As of the 2020 census, Sugar Grove had a population of 9,278. The population density was 878.68 inhabitants per square mile (339.26/km^{2}). Housing density averaged 328.06 per square mile (126.66/km^{2}). The median age was 42.0 years. 24.2% of residents were under the age of 18 and 15.9% of residents were 65 years of age or older. For every 100 females there were 100.0 males, and for every 100 females age 18 and over there were 95.0 males age 18 and over.

97.3% of residents lived in urban areas, while 2.7% lived in rural areas.

There were 3,342 households in Sugar Grove, of which 37.0% had children under the age of 18 living in them. Of all households, 68.9% were married-couple households, 10.3% were households with a male householder and no spouse or partner present, and 16.5% were households with a female householder and no spouse or partner present. About 17.0% of all households were made up of individuals and 7.2% had someone living alone who was 65 years of age or older.

There were 3,464 housing units, of which 3.5% were vacant. The homeowner vacancy rate was 1.6% and the rental vacancy rate was 8.4%.

=== Income and poverty ===
The median income for a household in the village was $110,607, and the median income for a family was $121,199. Males had a median income of $69,219 versus $40,315 for females. The per capita income for the village was $46,950. About 2.5% of families and 3.8% of the population were below the poverty line, including 1.4% of those under age 18 and 13.8% of those age 65 or over.

== Transportation and utilities ==
Sugar Grove is accessible by one interstate highway (Interstate 88), one US highway (US Route 30), and two state highways (Illinois Route 47 and Illinois Route 56). Route 56 connects the central part of Sugar Grove to Interstate 88. US 30 utilizes the same pavement as Illinois Route 47 from the village's southern border to the interchange with Illinois Route 56. US 30 then turns west. Illinois Route 47 is a heavily travelled route at the far western edge of the Chicago area and runs north–south through the village. Aurora Municipal Airport is situated on the northwest side of town, capable of handling small jets. The BNSF Railway's mainline from Chicago to Seattle runs through the village. The Virgil Gilman Trail is a paved bicycle trail connecting the city of Aurora to the east with Waubonsee Community College to the north.

== Major highways ==
Major highways in Sugar Grove include:

Interstate Highways
Interstate 88

US Highways
US 30

Illinois Highways
Route 47
Route 56
Route 110

== Education ==
Students who live in Sugar Grove attend either Kaneland Community Unit School District 302 or West Aurora Public School District 129. In Kaneland, children who are in grades K-5 attend Kaneland John Shields Elementary School in Sugar Grove or Kaneland McDole Elementary School in Montgomery. For grades 6–8, they attend Kaneland Harter Middle School in Sugar Grove, while grades 9-12 are served by Kaneland High School in Maple Park.

Waubonsee Community College, a two-year public community college, is located on Route 47 in the northern part of Sugar Grove.

== Services ==
In 2004, the library district passed an $8 million building bond for a new library. The bond was issued in February 2005. The doors opened on August 8, 2009. The facility is approximately 25,500 sq ft (2,370 m^{2}). The library district service area encompasses nearly all of Sugar Grove Township and the portion of Blackberry Township south of Seavey Road. Excluded from this geography are the areas in the city of Aurora and the village of North Aurora. In 2008, the district population was 15,476, of which 40% had a library card.

== Notable people ==
- P. J. Fleck, head football coach at University of Minnesota
- Leah Hayes, swimmer, Sports Illustrated Kids 2018 SportsKid of the Year
- Julie Montagu, Countess of Sandwich, entrepreneur, writer and reality television star
- Jim Oberweis, businessman and politician
- John F. Petit, businessman and politician; born in Sugar Grove
