= Lysander Butler Hamlin =

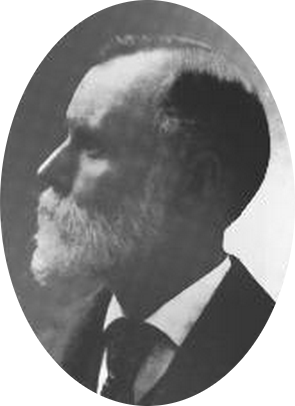
Lysander Butler Hamlin portrait from 1905

Lysander Butler Hamlin (26 January 1839 – 12 April 1910) was the maker of Hamlin's Wizard Oil, a patent medicine.

== Biography ==
He was born on 26 January 1839 in Bristol Township, Morgan County, Ohio to Dr. William Starr Hamlin and Eliza Welch. His brother was John Austen Hamlin. Together he and his brother manufactured and sold patent medicines in Cincinnati, Ohio. In 1861 they both moved to Chicago, where they marketed their Hamlin's Wizard Oil. On 16 December 1868 he married Ella Louisa Town, the daughter of Morris C. Town and Maria S. Selkregg.

He died on 12 April 1910 in Elgin, Illinois.
