= Dave Kaptain =

American politician

David "Dave" Kaptain

Mayor of Elgin, Illinois
- Incumbent
- Assumed office May 2011
- Preceded by: Ed Schock

Personal details
- Born: 1947 or 1948 (age 78–79) Elgin, Illinois, U.S.
- Spouse: Sandy Kaptain
- Education: Bradley University
- Occupation: Chemist
- Website: kaptainformayor.com

Dave Kaptain is an American chemist and politician who is the current mayor of Elgin, Illinois. Kaptain won the April 2011 election by receiving 54.35% of the mayoral votes, defeating incumbent Ed Schock.

Kapt School District U-46i bachelor' degree from Bradley University in Peoria, Illinois. He worked for 32 years for the Fox River Water Reclamat, including as a chief chemist, before retiring from there. He was also the Elgin Community Networ executive director.

He was on the Elgin city council from 2009 until becoming mayor. After winning the election for mayor, Kaptain said that part of his approach would be to visit the homes of community members in Elgin to confer with them about city governance matters and to encourage higher voter turnout.

== See also ==
- List of mayors of Elgin, Illinois
