= Ed Schock =

American politician

Mayor of Elgin, Illinois
- In office 1999–2011
- Preceded by: Kevin Kelly
- Succeeded by: Dave Kaptain

City Councilman of Elgin, Illinois
- In office 1993–1999
- Preceded by: Sue Moylan

Personal details
- Born: c. 1947
- Party: Republican
- Spouse: Karen (m. June 1971)
- Children: three
- Education: Roosevelt University
- Occupation: Elementary school principal

Edward "Ed" Schock (born circa 1947) is an Illinois politician and former elementary school principal. He began service on the Elgin City Council after winning election in 1993, and he was re-elected in 1997. In 1999, Schock successfully contested incumbent Kevin Kelly for the office of Mayor of Elgin. He was re-elected in 2003 and 2007.

He married his wife Karen in June 1971. Schock is a lifelong Elgin resident and the couple has three adult children.

The Elgin government was dominated by Republicans and no City Council member was opposed by a Democrat or independent when he ran for re-election. During his time on the City Council, he was part of a 4–3 majority opposition block to Mayor Kevin Kelly. In the mid-1990s, Elgin had extensive debates on how to manage its casino revenues. As a city councilman, his proposal that seniors be given a property tax rebate because of surplus riverboat tax revenues made news outside of Illinois. Schock remained principal of Coleman Elementary School while on the city council.

His starting annual salary as mayor in 1999 was $7000, and he continued to serve as a principal until he retired in 2003. Day-to-day responsibilities fell to the full-time city manager. As a mayor, his city's success at managing its gambling-dependent economy and its relationship with the Grand Victoria Casino Elgin was well chronicled throughout the country. Revenues from the casino have helped pay for the Elgin Police Department building and a new town recreation center. In 2000, he lured Motorola to bring its distribution center to Elgin by using an Illinois state economic incentives package.

== See also ==
- List of mayors of Elgin, Illinois
