= Hampshire Forest Preserve =

Forest preserve in Kane County, Illinois, United States

- Location within Illinois
- Location: Kane County, Illinois, USA
- Nearest city: Hampshire, Illinois
- Coordinates: 42.112247°N 88.488975°W
- Area: 13,146,533 square feet (1,221,352.9 m^{2})
- Elevation: 970–1,030 ft (median 1,000 ft)
- Established: 1940
- Governing body: Forest Preserve District of Kane County

Hampshire Forest Preserve is a publicly owned natural area located in Kane County, Illinois, within the United States. Covering approximately 302 acres (1.22 km^{2}), the preserve includes areas of oak savanna, tallgrass prairie, and wetland habitats, characteristic of the Midwest. It was officially established in 1940 by the Forest Preserve District of Kane County as part of early efforts to conserve open space and promote outdoor recreation in the region.

== Geography ==
The terrain of Hampshire Forest Preserve includes rolling woodlands, prairie patches, and several gentle inclines typical of the region. A variety of soil types support diverse vegetation zones across the preserve.

The elevation of the preserve ranges from approximately 970 feet (296 m) at its lowest point to 1,030 feet (314 m) at the highest point, with a median elevation of around 1,000 feet (305 m).

== Flora and fauna ==
The preserve features a wide range of native plant species, including big bluestem, switchgrass, black-eyed Susan, wild bergamot, and mature oak and hickory stands in the forested areas.

Local wildlife includes white-tailed deer, red foxes, wild turkeys, and a variety of songbirds and raptors. Wetland zones support amphibians such as frogs and salamanders, as well as migratory waterfowl.

== Conservation and restoration efforts ==
Ongoing conservation work includes prairie restoration, invasive species removal, and prescribed burns conducted in cooperation with state agencies. The preserve also participates in regional biodiversity studies and habitat improvement programs.

== Human history ==
Initially used for agriculture and grazing, the land was gradually acquired by local authorities seeking to preserve open space during early conservation movements in Illinois.

The preserve was officially established in 1940 by the Kane County Forest Preserve District.

In the 1970s, major trail systems were developed, and in 2001 a wetland restoration project revitalized over 40 acres of habitat. Community involvement grew through educational programs in the 2010s.

== Recreation ==
Hampshire Forest Preserve offers over 10 miles of marked trails suitable for hiking, mountain biking, and horseback riding. Trail surfaces range from gravel paths to natural dirt tracks.

The preserve includes picnic shelters equipped with grills and tables.

Seasonal events include spring wildflower walks, autumn foliage tours, and nature education camps for youth during summer months.

A model aircraft field with grass runways allows for model aircraft and drones in the specified areas only.

== Park management ==
The preserve is accessible via County Road 3 (Allen Road), located approximately 3 miles northeast of Hampshire, Illinois. Directional signage is posted on nearby highways.

Free parking is available at the main entrance lot. The back parking lot is open spring through fall.

Hampshire Forest Preserve is open daily from sunrise to sunset. Trail access is prohibited after dark.

Trails are mowed.

== See also ==
- List of protected areas of Illinois
- Conservation in the United States

== Sources ==
- "Hampshire Forest Preserve Restoration Continues," Westville Weekly, May 2015.
