= Dundee Township Park District =

Park district in Illinois, United States

Coordinates: 42°6′18.2″N 88°15′36.7″W

The Dundee Township Park District provides park areas, open spaces, recreational facilities and services in the Dundee Township of Kane County, Illinois, United States. It serves the communities of Carpentersville, East Dundee, West Dundee, Sleepy Hollow, and portions of Elgin, Barrington Hills, Hoffman Estates, Gilberts and Algonquin.

== Services ==
The Dundee Township Park District offers a wide variety of services to both residents and non-residents of Dundee Township. The facilities and services offered include a recreation and fitness center, a day care center, two golf courses, a senior center, two outdoor swimming pools which include Dolphin Cove Family Aquatic Center and Sleepy Hollow Pool, an indoor pool, Randall Oaks Barnyard Zoo, 40 park sites and facilities, and 92 acres (37 ha) of woodlands at Raceway Woods.

=== Senior center ===
The senior center is located at 665 Barrington Ave in Carpentersville. It offers classes, programs, special events, day trips, extended tours and social clubs for adults aged 50 or older. It was built in 2003 and provides its services six days a week.

=== Golf courses ===
The Park District has two 18-hole public golf courses, Bonnie Dundee and Randall Oaks. Bonnie Dundee Golf Course is located 3 miles (4.8 km) north of Interstate 90 (I-90) on Route 25 in East Dundee. It was built in 1924 by architect C. D. Wegstaff. It has a clubhouse and banquet room. Randall Oaks Golf Course is located 2.5 miles (4.0 km) north of I-90 just off Randall Road in West Dundee. It has two practice facilities, two putting greens, a clubhouse, and a 3-hole Acorn family course.

=== Athletics ===
The Park District's athletic programs provide competitive programs within different leagues and clubs, as well as learning programs that teach basic skills for various sports.

=== Camps ===
The Park District camps provide activities for children in arts and crafts, field trips, special events, and other activities.

=== Early childhood ===
The Park District offers a preschool/pre-kindergarten and child care center, helping to prepare children for kindergarten.

== Governing body ==
The Board of Commissioners governs the Dundee Township Park District. It is composed of five elected officials who represent their community. Its current members are:

- Erin O'Leary - President
- Jim Bonkoski - Vice President
- John Meschewski - Treasurer
- Pam Griffin - Secretary
- Frank Scarpelli - Commissioner

== History ==
The Park District was established in 1952. It followed a referendum campaign motivated by the need to have a permanent administrative body to oversee the operation of Edmund Haeger Memorial Pool, which was located in Lions Park.

One of the first buildings that the District operated was the Besinger Community Center, which opened on December 26, 1959. This housed the Park District’s senior center before construction of its replacement began in 2002.

In 1962, voters approved a bond issue of $225,000 to build Thresher Pool. L.W. Besinger donated the land for the pool and the pool was opened on July 2, 1963. In December 1963, the Park District announced plans to construct a golf course and open a park site on Randall Road. The park opened in 1964 and was dedicated as Randall Oaks Park. Its facilities included a petting zoo, which still operates. Randall Oaks Golf Course was opened in September 1965 and its18-hole course completed in June 1966.

In 1971, the Park District purchased Library Hall, an historical building constructed in 1895. This became the Administrative Offices of the District and remains so. In 1972, the Park District purchased the Sleepy Hollow pool for the cost of $120,000. Private interests had previously operated this pool. In 1986 the pool was renovated to include a new filtration system and a zero depth entry area.

In the late 1970s, the Park District received grant funds to purchase an additional 130 acres (0.53 km^{2}) to add to the existing 27-acre (110,000 m^{2}) Randall Oaks Park.

In 1982, a community building was constructed and dedicated to Al Price, whose family owned and operated the farm prior to the Park District’s purchase.

Construction on a 50,000-square-foot (4,600 m^{2}) recreation center stated in July 1988. The center's pool was completed in early July 1989, and the building was opened to the public that September. In 1993, the Park District completed construction of Dolphin Cove Family Aquatic Center. The water park contains two large flume slides and two smaller slides, a sand volleyball court, concession center and a sand play area. The water park connects to the recreation center's pool.

In 1988, a $200,000 grant from the Illinois Department of Natural Resources was obtained for projects at Randall Oaks Park. A community picnic shelter, playground, basketball court and trails were built. More recently, baseball and football fields have been added to the park.

On November 5, 1991, voters approved a $4.9 million bond issue to purchase Bonnie Dundee Golf Course. The Park District began operation on the course in 1992. In 1995 the course was renovated to include an underground irrigation system and an additional parking area on the golf course grounds.

On November 3, 1992, voters approved a $1.5 million referendum to purchase 50 acres (200,000 m^{2}) of wooded property that was part of an old racetrack. The Kane County Forest Preserve District agreed to purchase an adjoining 42 acres (170,000 m^{2}). Since that time, nearly $100,000 has been spent on restoration work at raceway woods.

In summer 2000, development of Prairie Meadow Park was completed in West Dundee. The park has an in-line/ice skating rink, playground, picnic shelter, basketball court and soccer fields. A $200,000 grant from the Illinois Department of Natural Resources was secured for this project. A cooperative venture with School District #300 was agreed upon in the winter of 2001. The park district contributed funds to enlarge gyms to provide additional programming areas, at two of the new schools being constructed.

The construction of a new senior center began in 2002. It developed as an addition to the recreation center. This center includes a large multi-purpose room with a state, arts and crafts room, library and computer room, and offices. The center was completed in 2003.

== Park list ==
Name	Town	Features
Aldis Park	West Dundee	Picnic Area, Playground, Tennis Courts
Algonquin Lakes Park	Algonquin	Baseball Diamonds, Basketball Court, Playground, Washrooms
Austin Park	Carpentersville	Basketball Court, Tot Lot
Bartels Park	East Dundee	Basketball Court, Picnic Shelter, Playground,
Besigner Park	Carpentersville	Playground
Carrington Park	West Dundee	Gazebo, Playground, Tot Lot,
Deerpath Park	Carpentersville	Baseball Diamonds, Basketball Court, Picnic Shelter, Playground, Tot Lot, and Walking trail
Fairview Park	Carpentersville	Baseball Diamonds, Basketball Court, Playground
Glen Eagle Park	Carpentersville	Baseball Diamonds, Playground
Golfview Park	Carpentersville	Baseball Diamonds
Grafelman Park	West Dundee	Gazebo, Playground, Tennis Courts, Washrooms
Grandview Park	Carpentersville	Basketball Court, Picnic Shelter, Playground, Tot Lot, Walking Trail
Hickory Hill Park	Carpentersville	Baseball Diamonds
Huffman Park	West Dundee	Baseball Diamonds, Basketball Court, Playground, Soccer Field, Tennis Courts, TotLot
Keele Farm Park	Carpentersville	Open Space
Kemper Park	Carpentersville	Baseball Diamonds, Playground
Liberty Elementary School Park	Carpentersville	Playground, Soccer Field, Tot Lot
Lions Park	East Dundee	Baseball Diamonds, Basketball Court, Picnic Area, Play Ground, Tennis Courts, Tot Lot
Meadowdale Park	Carpentersville	Soccer Field
Morningside Park	Carpentersville	Boys & Girls Club Site, Playground,
Prairie Meadows Park	West Dundee	Baseball Backstop, Basketball Court, Ice Rink, Picnic Area, Playgrond, Roller Hockey, Soccer Field
Randall Oaks Park	West Dundee	Barnyard Petting Zoo, Baseball Diamonds, Centerville School, Picnic Area, Playground, Tot Lot, Volleyball Courts
Rolling Hills Park	Carpentersville	Basketball Court, Playground,
Sabatino Park	Sleepy Hollow	Baseball Diamonds, Playground. Soccer Field, Tot Lot
Shenandoah Park	Carpentersville	Playground
Silverstone Lake Park	Carpentersville	Baseball Diamonds, Climbing Wall, Fitness Trail, Picnic Area, Playground, Soccer Field
Sleepy Hollow Park	Sleepy Hollow	Basketball Court, Playground, Tennis Courts, Volleyball Courts
South End Park	West Dundee	Baseball Diamonds, Basketball Court, Bike Trail Connection, Canoe Launch, Picnic Area, Playground, Washrooms
