= David Voorhees =

American geologist

- Born: David Hillyer Voorhees
- Education: University of Rochester; Rensselaer Polytechnic Institute; University of Illinois Urbana-Champaign
- Occupation: Geologist

David Hillyer Voorhees is an American geologist. He is a professor in the department of earth science and geology at Waubonsee Community College.

In 2014, Voorhees was named a fellow of the American Association for the Advancement of Science.
