= List of mayors of Elgin, Illinois =

The following is a list of mayors of the city of Elgin, Illinois, United States.

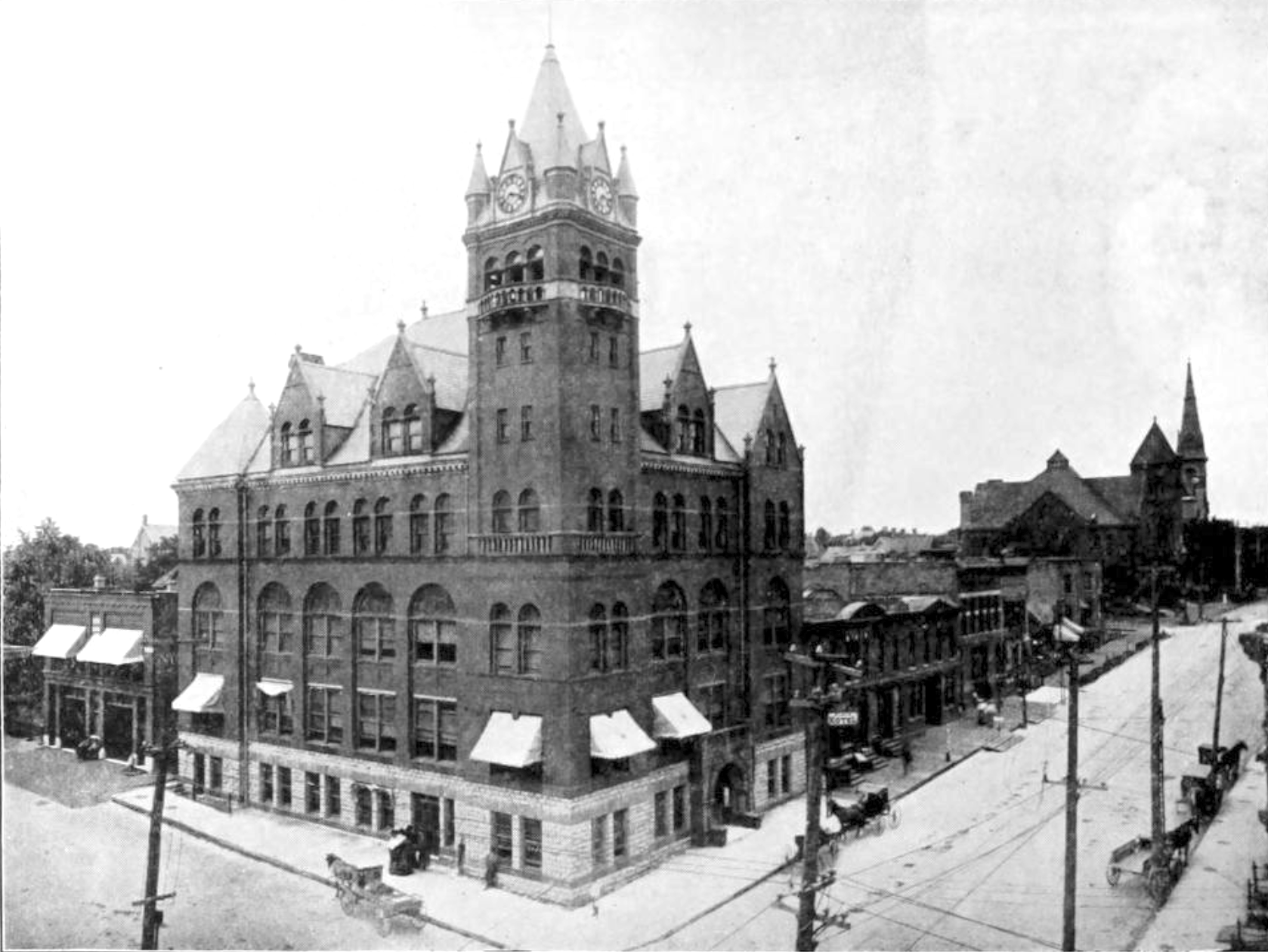
City hall building in Elgin, Illinois (photo circa 1903)

- Joseph Tefft, 1854-1855, 1863, 1866, 1868
- Sam’l J. Kimball, 1856-1857
- John Hill, 1858
- Andrew J. Waldron, 1859-18560
- Edward S. Joslyn, 1861, 1865
- Walter L. Pease, 1862, 1864
- John Shuler Wilcox, 1867
- Melvin B. Baldwin, 1869-1870
- William C. Kimball, 1871
- Geo. S. Bowen, 1872-1873
- David F. Barclay, 1874-1876, 1883-1884
- Edward Coultas Lovell, 1877
- Ed. F. Reeves, 1878
- Geo. P. Lord, 1879
- Franklin S. Bosworth, 1880-1882
- Henry B. Willis, 1885-1887
- Vincent C. Lovell, 1887-1889
- Arwin E. Price, 1889-1890, 1898-1902
- Wm. Grote, 1891-1895
- Charles Harley Wayne, 1896-1897
- Augustine (“Gus”) Hamilton Hubbard, c.1903-1905
- Arwin E. Price, c.1922-1923
- Earle R. Kelley, c.1923-1925
- Myron M. Lehman, c.1931-1943, 1951-1955
- Walter E. Miller, c.1945-1951
- Myron M. Lehman, 1951-1955
- Elmer Charles "Mike" Alft Jr., 1967-1971
- Kevin Kelly, 1995-1999
- Ed Schock, 1999-2011
- Dave Kaptain, 2011–present

== See also ==
- Elgin history
