= John F. Petit =

American politician and businessman

John Frank Petit (September 29, 1887–April 9, 1963) was an American politician and businessman.

Petit was born in Sugar Grove, Illinois. He was involved with the insurance and real estate business. Petit was also involved with the Democratic Party. He served as the postmaster for Mooseheart, Illinois during the administration of President Woodrow Wilson. Petit lived in Batavia, Illinois. He served in the Illinois House of Representatives from 1928 to 1939. He died at his home in Carpentersville, Illinois from a long illness.
