= Dwight Smith Young =

American physicist (1892–1975)

- Born: 22 October 1892; Elgin, Illinois
- Died: 24 December 1975 (aged 83); Illinois
- Occupations: Photographer, physicist

Dwight Smith Young (22 October 1892 – 24 December 1975) was an American physicist who took part in the Manhattan Project. He was given the nickname "The Hermit of Pajarito Canyon" after making his home in an old log cabin in a remote canyon on the Los Alamos testing site from roughly 1946 to 1952.

== Early life ==
Young was born in Elgin, Illinois, raised in Oswego, Illinois, and attended East Aurora High School in Aurora, Illinois. After graduating from high school in 1910, Young worked as a carpenter with his father, Lou C. Young, taking photographs of their construction projects and providing a photographic record of such things as barn-building techniques of the early 20th century. After two years of carpentry, Young took up photography full time, eventually working with a photographer named Henry Morris in Galveston, Texas in 1915. It was during this tenure that he had the occasion to photograph the aftermath of the 1915 Galveston Hurricane. Upon returning home, he opened his own photography studio in Wilmington, Illinois.

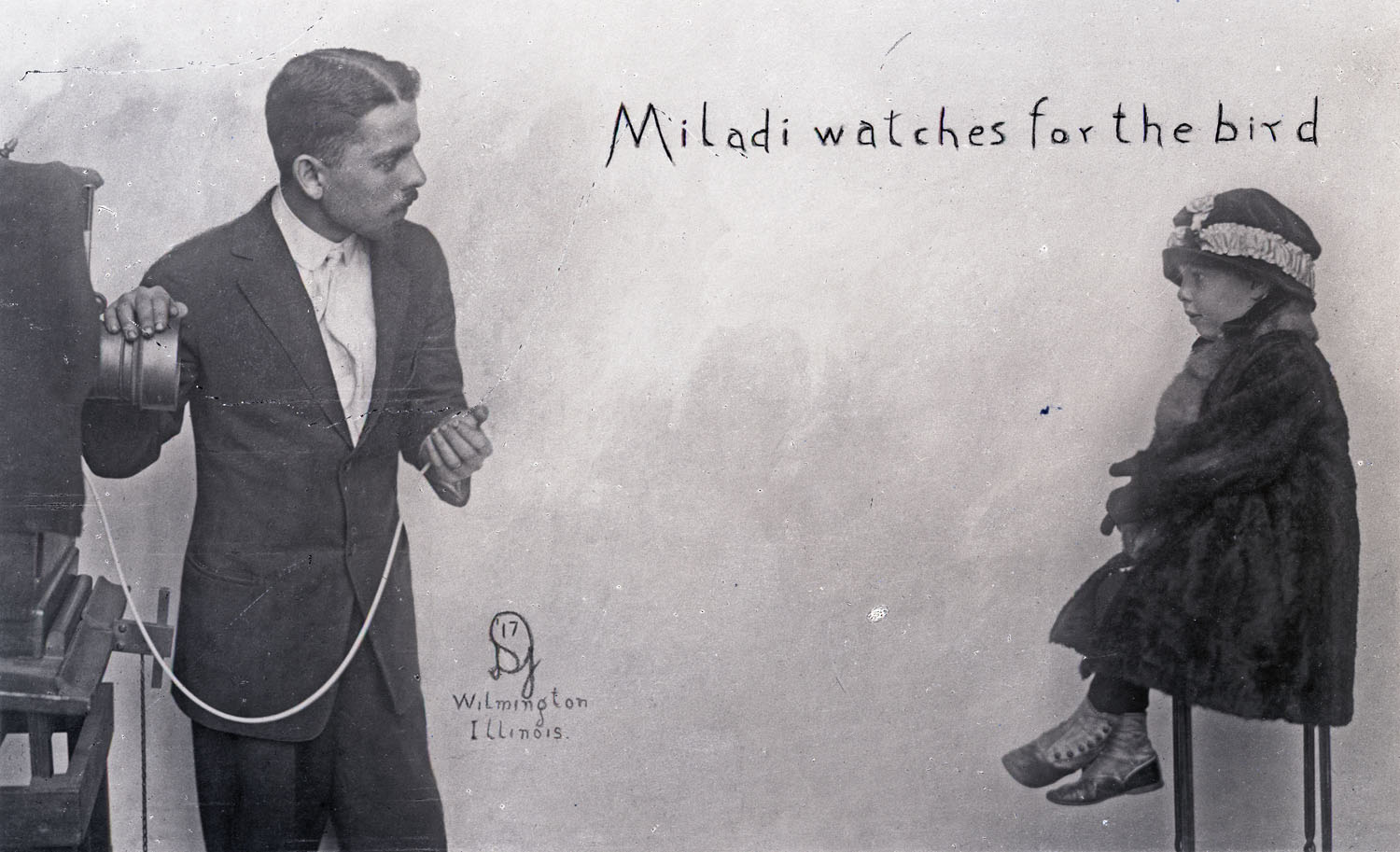
1917 self-portrait of Dwight Smith Young in his Wilmington, Illinois studio.

During America's involvement in World War I, Young enlisted in the U.S. Army Air Service, a forerunner of the United States Air Force, and was at the School of Military Aeronautics in Austin, Texas as a cadet undergoing pilot training when the war ended. After his military service, Young returned to Illinois and continued working as a carpenter and photographer. During the Great Depression of the 1930s and into the early 1940s, Young worked as a maintenance man at the Pictorial Paper Package Corporation in Aurora, Illinois. Not happy with that work, he recalled to an interviewer that he "decided to see what was going on at the University of Chicago." Despite having no college education, in 1942 he took an on-the-spot PhD oral exam and was given a job as a technician at the Metallurgical Laboratory at the university.

== Work in Los Alamos ==
The Metallurgical Laboratory being a cover name for the research into the production and weaponization of plutonium during World War II, Young was hired by and worked under group leader Edward Creutz for nine months in Chicago before transferring with Creutz's group to Project Y in Los Alamos, New Mexico. From 1943 until 1953, Young worked officially as a technician with "principal effort on photographic processes, general mechanical work and some electronics"; however, as his Group Leader H.C. Paxton explained to Division Leader R.E. Schreiber in a letter requesting Young's promotion from graded technician to full staff member in 1952:

"By the time I reached Group W-2, Mr. Young's interest in the group's program was most general and surprisingly fundamental. The empirical point of view, normally associated with technicians, was nicely supplemented by attention to basic processes, e.g. chemical reactions in photography, ionic processes in particle counters and neutron behaviour in critical assemblies. He was designing and carrying through experimental investigations to supplement the principal group activities. Illustrative is a file of informal reports by him on self-initiated work [...] that includes the following items: the influence of ambient temperature on the reactivity level of Topsy; a study of the self-heating of topsy; pulse shapes characteristic of a boron-lined neutron detector; studies of the stability and linearity of long-geometry neutron counting systems; a description of the "Fission Fragment Catcher-Photographic Emulsion Method of Studying Neutron Distributions," and its application to the Oy-polythene assembly and to Topsy with various perturbations."

Despite lacking a university degree or any formal nuclear physics training, Young received his promotion to full staff member in 1953. In December 1956, Young delivered a talk at the American Nuclear Society in Washington, D.C. about a simplified method for taking neutron measurements around a "critical assembly" machine.

=== Criticality accident ===
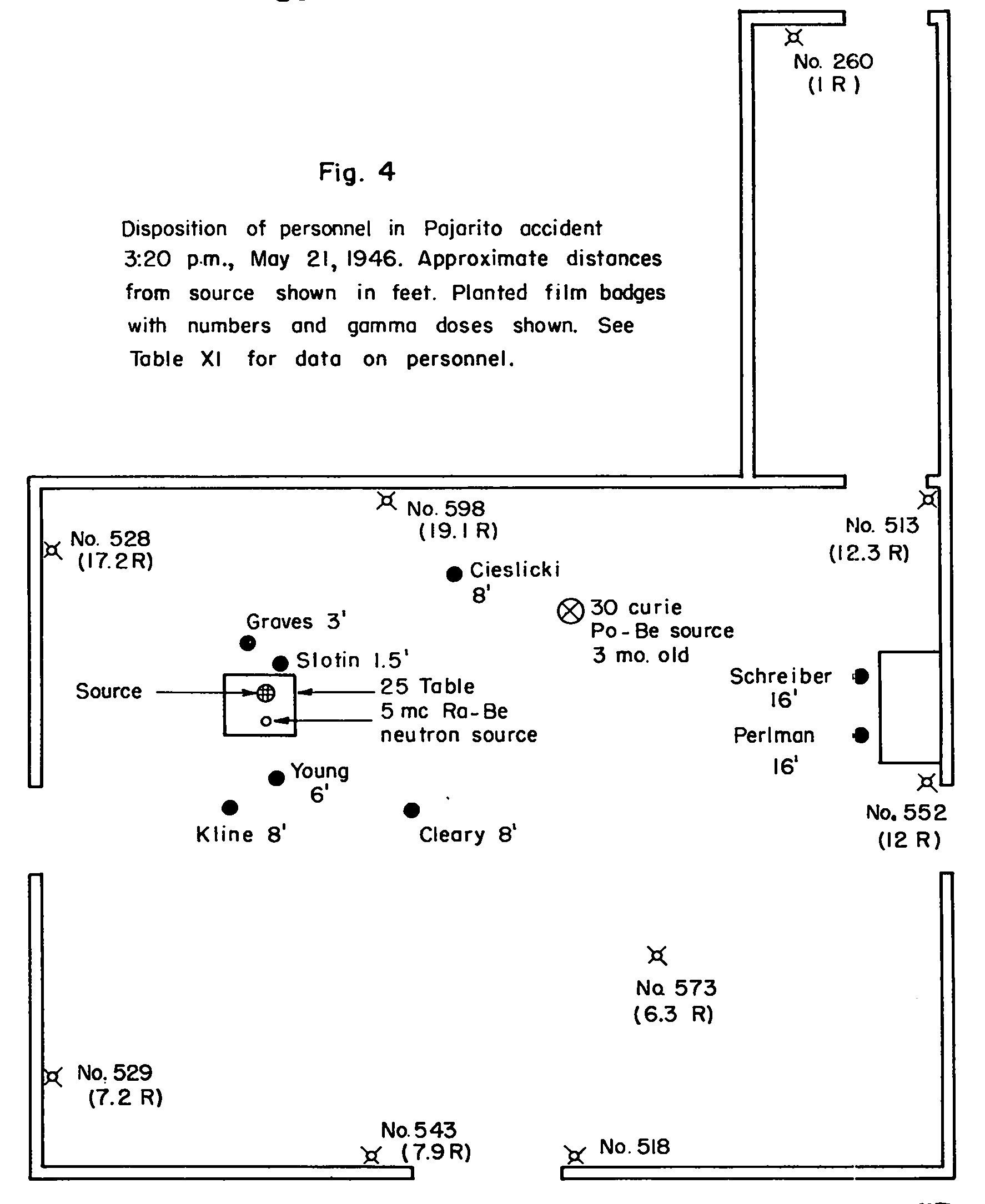
A diagram showing those present at the accident and their approximate distance from the source of the radiation burst.

On May 21, 1946, Young was present with six colleagues at Project Y's Omega Site as Louis Slotin performed an experiment that involved the creation of one of the first steps of a fission reaction by placing two beryllium hemispheric shells around a plutonium core. Holding the upper hemisphere with his left hand through a thumb hole at the top, Slotin maintained the separation of the beryllium shells using the blade of a screwdriver with his right hand, having removed the shims normally used to maintain separation. At exactly 15:20 the screwdriver slipped out from between the hemispheres, causing the upper beryllium shell to close down on the lower shell and triggering a prompt critical reaction and an accompanying burst of nuclear radiation. Young, the third-closest person to the burst, ran out of the building and stopped behind an earth barricade before returning to check for those that might still be inside.

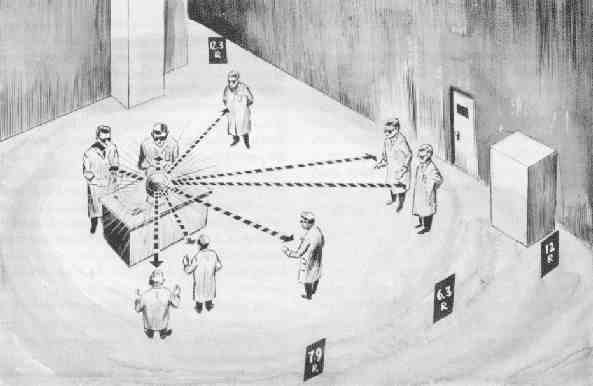
A drawing based on the above diagram.

Within five days of the accident, four of the men present in the room had been released from the army hospital. After nine days of increasingly traumatic physical deterioration, Slotin died at 11:00 on May 30, in the presence of his parents. Young remained under close observation and hospital care for more than four months after Slotin's death. For the rest of his life Young's body was tested for radiation damage, with the results always being negative – including such a test just six months before his death.

=== Little Eva ===
In 1951, while working on a paper he was writing in his spare time, Young needed to do emulsion studies but lacked a small neutron source. For this a small nuclear reactor was needed. Although engineers at the laboratory told him that such a nuclear reactor could not be built, he designed one himself and built it with the help of a machinist at a cost of $1200, naming it "Little Eva" after a character in Harriet Beecher Stowe's anti-slavery novel Uncle Tom's Cabin. For years the Young's Little Eva nuclear reactor was one of the Los Alamos laboratory's most successful neutron sources. In 1958 it was taken to the Nuclear Rocket Development Site in Mercury, Nevada, to calibrate foils for reactor diagnostics, and on 22 November 1958 was the first nuclear reactor to go critical in Nevada.

=== Independent work outside the laboratory ===
In addition to his professional work at the Los Alamos Scientific Laboratory, Young conducted independent archaeological research, including supervising the excavation of a site of ruins in the Pajarito Canyon of New Mexico. In 1954 he wrote an article for New Mexico Magazine detailing his exploration of a previously unstudied collection of pictographs etched into stones in the White Rock Canyon of the Rio Grande. The same year, Young conducted dendrochronology studies at the site of a 21-room pueblo dating between A.D. 1225 and 1350, and produced a report on the Tsirege Cave Site on the north wall of Pajarito Canyon.
