= Hamlin's Wizard Oil =

American patent medicine

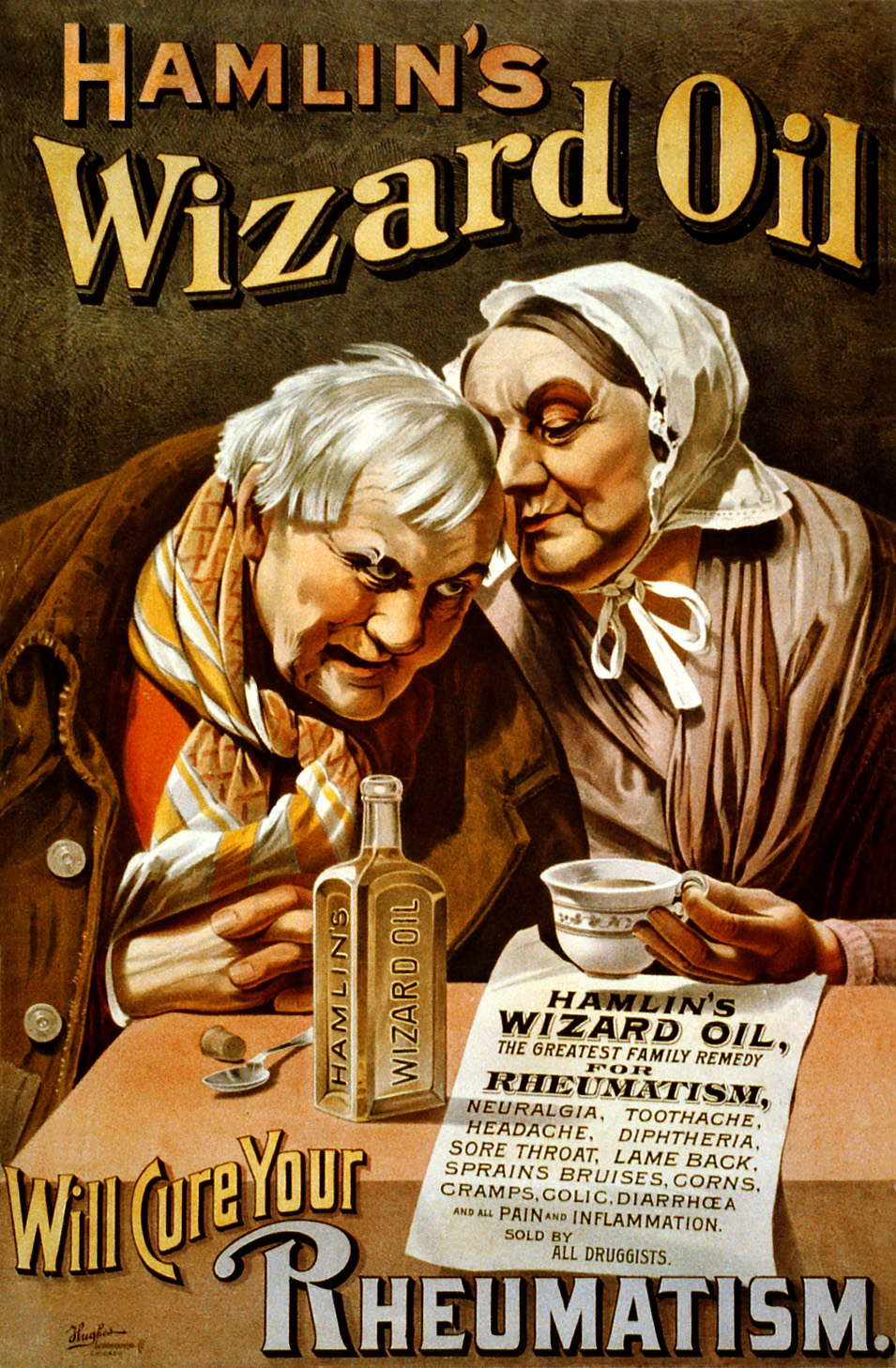
Advertising poster from about 1890

Hamlin's Wizard Oil was an American patent medicine sold as a cure-all under the slogan "There is no Sore it will Not Heal, No Pain it will not Subdue."

== History ==
First produced in 1861 in Chicago by former magician John Austin Hamlin and his brother Lysander Butler Hamlin, it was primarily sold and used as a liniment for rheumatic pain and sore muscles, but was advertised as a treatment for pneumonia, cancer, diphtheria, earache, toothache, headache, and hydrophobia. It was made of 50–70% alcohol containing camphor, ammonia, chloroform, sassafras, cloves, and turpentine, and was said to be usable both internally and topically.

Traveling performance troupes advertised the product in medicine shows across the Midwest, with runs as long as six weeks in a town. They used horse-drawn wagons and dressed in silk top hats, frock coats, pinstriped trousers, and patent leather shoes—with spats. They distributed song books at the shows and in pharmacies. Performers included James Whitcomb Riley, singer and composer Paul Dresser from Indiana, and southern gospel music progenitor Charles Davis Tillman.

At these gatherings, John Austin Hamlin delivered lectures replete with humor borrowed from the writings of Robert Jones Burdette.

Grinnell College research points out that the Hamlins claimed efficacy for Wizard Oil on not only human beings but also horses and cattle, one poster displaying an elephant drinking the product by lifting the bottle with its trunk. Bottles came in 35¢ and 75¢ sizes. Carl Sandburg inserted two versions of lyrics titled "Wizard Oil" together with a tune into his American Songbag (1927).

John Austin Hamlin would use the profits of Hamlin's Wizard Oil to found and manage Chicago's Grand Opera House.

In 1916, Lysander's son Lawrence B. Hamlin of Elgin, by then manager of the firm, was fined $200 under the 1906 Pure Food and Drug Act for advertising that Hamlin's Wizard Oil could "check the growth and permanently kill cancer."

== See also ==
- List of topics characterized as pseudoscience
