= E. C. Alft =

American politician (1925–2021)

Elmer C. "Mike" Alft Jr.
- Born: July 13, 1925; Chicago, Illinois, U.S.
- Died: November 22, 2021 (aged 96); West Grove, Pennsylvania, U.S.
- Occupations: Historian, educator and politician

Elmer Charles "Mike" Alft Jr. (July 13, 1925 – November 22, 2021) was an American historian and former mayor of Elgin, Illinois. Born in Chicago, Illinois, he graduated Phi Beta Kappa from Grinnell College in 1949 and received his master's degree from the Maxwell School of Citizenship and Public Affairs at Syracuse University in 1950. He taught at Elgin High School for four decades while serving as city councilman, mayor, secretary of the Board of Trustees of the Gail Borden Public Library District, and various other capacities in local government. In addition he was a part-time instructor at Elgin Community College.

Alft was elected to the Elgin City Council in the at-large election in April, 1963. Four years later, he was elected Mayor, succeeding Clyde Shales. As was the custom at the time, Alft did not seek reelection when his four-year term expired in 1971. William Rauschenberger was elected to succeed him.

He may be best known as a historian of Elgin. He has published several books on the history of Elgin and the surrounding area, in addition to hundreds of articles for the local newspaper, the Elgin Daily Courier-News. He also wrote a biweekly column on Elgin's history. In 2001, Alft appeared on C-SPAN as part of a panel of local historians discussing Upton Sinclair and Theodore Dreiser.

== Works ==
- Your Illinois Banks, Illinois Bankers Association, 1957
- A Century of Service: The First National Bank of Elgin, Elgin, 1965
- Elgin High : a centennial history and record book, 1869–1969, Board of Education, Elgin Public Schools, 1969
- Elgin Area Landmarks: A Community Heritage Tour Guide, Elgin Area Historical Society, 1975
- South Elgin, A history of the village from its origin as Clintonville, South Elgin Heritage Commission, 1979
- Hanover Township, Bartlett Historical Society, 1980
- The Elgin Historic District, Elgin Area Historical Society and Gifford Park Association, 1980
- Elgin, An American History 1835-1985, Crossroads Communications, 1984
- Sherman Hospital: A century of caring, Crossroads Communications, 1987
- Old Elgin: A Pictorial History, G. Bradley Publishing, 1991
- Elgin: Days Gone By, Crossroads Communications, 1992
- Books and More: a history of the Gail Borden Public Library, 1996
- Elgin's Black Heritage, City of Elgin, 1996
- Elgin Time: A History of the Elgin National Watch Company 1864-1968, Elgin Area Historical Society, 2003
- An Elgin almanac: a book of stories, records, lists and curiosities, City of Elgin, 2004
- Elgin parks: A community history, City of Elgin, 2005
- Elgin: A Women's City, Elgin Area Historical Society, 2008
- Promoting Elgin: A centennial history of the Elgin Area Chamber of Commerce, 1908–2008, Elgin Area Chamber, 2008
- Hispanics in Elgin: A brief history, Elgin Area Historical Society, 2010
- A History of Elgin History, Elgin Area Historical Society, 2011, ISBN 978-0-9815626-3-6

== See also ==
- List of mayors of Elgin, Illinois

== Sources ==
- Alft Family History
- Mike Alft, former Elgin mayor, historian and longtime library board trustee, dead at age 96
