= Big Rock, Illinois =

- Village
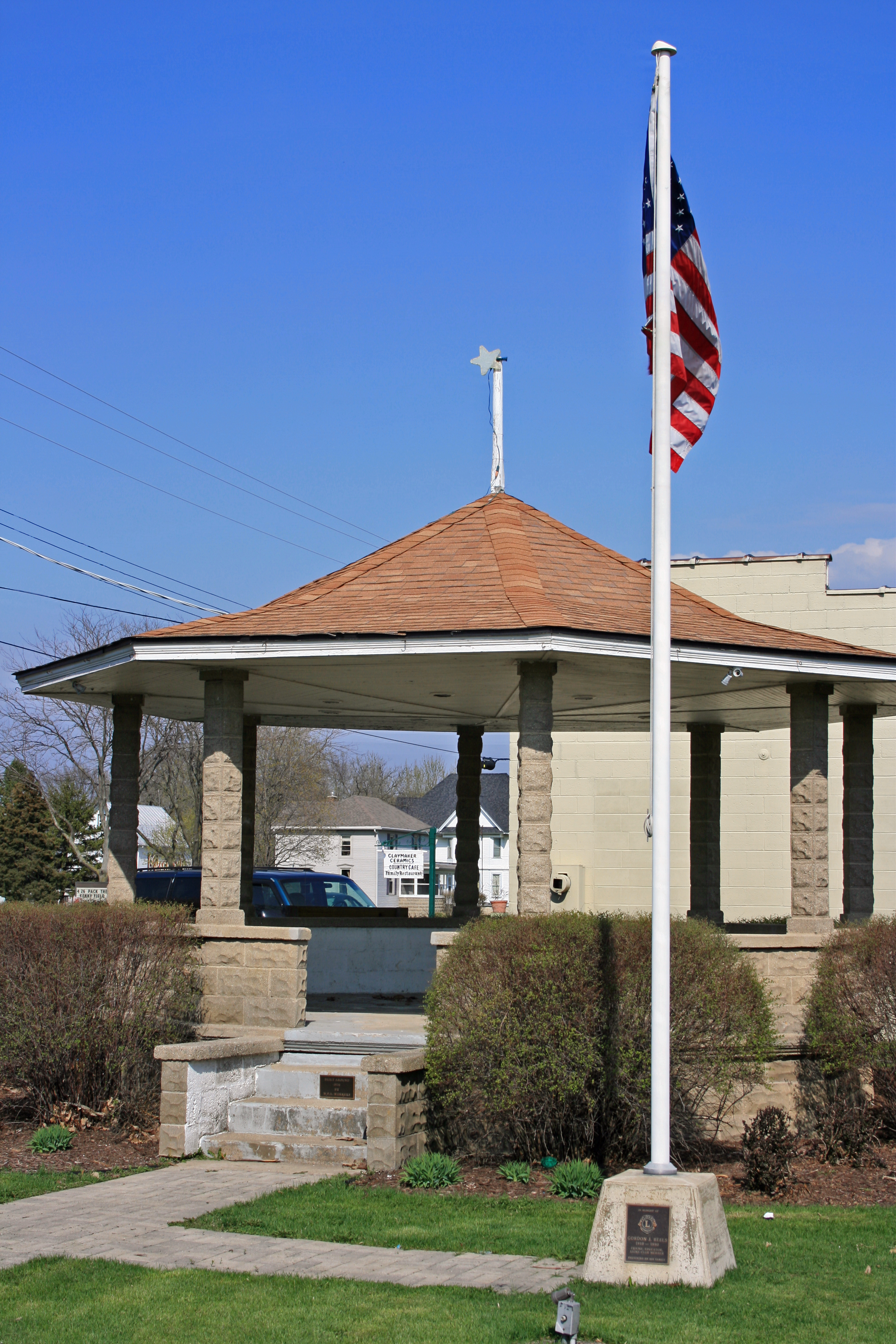
- Gazebo in downtown Big Rock

- Location of Big Rock in Kane County, Illinois

- Location of Illinois in the United States
- Coordinates: 41°46′00″N 88°31′35″W
- Country: United States
- State: Illinois
- County: Kane
- Township: Big Rock, Sugar Grove
- Established: 2001

Government

Area
  - Total: 4.32 sq mi (11.18 km^{2})
  - Land: 4.32 sq mi (11.18 km^{2})
  - Water: 0 sq mi (0.00 km^{2})
- Elevation: 702 ft (214 m)

Population (2020)
  - Total: 1,104
  - Density: 255.7/sq mi (98.71/km^{2})
- Time zone: UTC-6 (CST)
  - Summer (DST): UTC-5 (CDT)
- ZIP code: 60511
- Area code(s): 630, 331
- FIPS code: 17-05976
- GNIS feature ID: 2398118
- Website: www.villageofbigrock.us

Big Rock is a village in Kane County, Illinois, United States. It is located approximately 50 miles (80 km) due west of Chicago. It is between the villages of Hinckley and Sugar Grove.

The village was incorporated on July 26, 2001. As of the 2020 census it had a population of 1,104.

== Geography ==
Big Rock is located in southwestern Kane County. U.S. Route 30 passes through the north side of the village, leading east 5 miles (8 km) to Sugar Grove and west the same distance to Hinckley.

According to the 2021 census gazetteer files, Big Rock has a total area of 4.32 square miles (11.19 km^{2}), all land.

== Demographics ==
Historical population
Census	Pop.	Note	%±
2010	1,126		—
2020	1,104		−2.0%
U.S. Decennial Census

=== Racial and ethnic composition ===
Big Rock village, Illinois – Racial and ethnic composition Note: the US Census treats Hispanic/Latino as an ethnic category. This table excludes Latinos from the racial categories and assigns them to a separate category. Hispanics/Latinos may be of any race.
Race / Ethnicity (NH = Non-Hispanic)	Pop 2010	Pop 2020	% 2010	% 2020
White alone (NH)	1,073	984	95.29%	89.13%
Black or African American alone (NH)	6	3	0.53%	0.27%
Native American or Alaska Native alone (NH)	4	1	0.36%	0.09%
Asian alone (NH)	2	5	0.18%	0.45%
Native Hawaiian or Pacific Islander alone (NH)	0	0	0.00%	0.00%
Other race alone (NH)	3	0	0.27%	0.00%
Mixed race or Multiracial (NH)	16	37	1.42%	3.35%
Hispanic or Latino (any race)	22	74	1.95%	6.70%
Total	1,126	1,104	100.00%	100.00%

=== 2020 census ===
As of the 2020 census, Big Rock had a population of 1,104. The population density was 255.67 inhabitants per square mile (98.71/km^{2}). The median age was 44.5 years. 21.8% of residents were under the age of 18 and 19.4% of residents were 65 years of age or older. For every 100 females, there were 105.2 males, and for every 100 females age 18 and over there were 104.0 males age 18 and over.

0.0% of residents lived in urban areas, while 100.0% lived in rural areas.

There were 409 households in Big Rock, of which 30.1% had children under the age of 18 living in them. Of all households, 67.0% were married-couple households, 14.2% were households with a male householder and no spouse or partner present, and 13.2% were households with a female householder and no spouse or partner present. About 16.6% of all households were made up of individuals and 7.6% had someone living alone who was 65 years of age or older.

There were 430 housing units at an average density of 99.58 per square mile (38.45/km^{2}), of which 4.9% were vacant. The homeowner vacancy rate was 0.8% and the rental vacancy rate was 4.7%.

=== Income and poverty ===
The median income for a household in the village was $106,375, and the median income for a family was $111,071. Males had a median income of $58,571 versus $41,029 for females. The per capita income for the village was $46,158. About 0.0% of families and 0.6% of the population were below the poverty line, including 0.0% of those under age 18 and 0.0% of those age 65 or over.

== Education ==
Big Rock Township is a part of the Hinckley-Big Rock Community Unit School District 429, which operates three schools:

- Hinckley-Big Rock Elementary School is located on the west side of Hinckley on US HWY 30.
- Hinckley-Big Rock Middle School is located in the center of Big Rock on US HWY 30.
- Hinckley-Big Rock High School is located on the east side of Hinckley on US HWY 30.

== Images ==
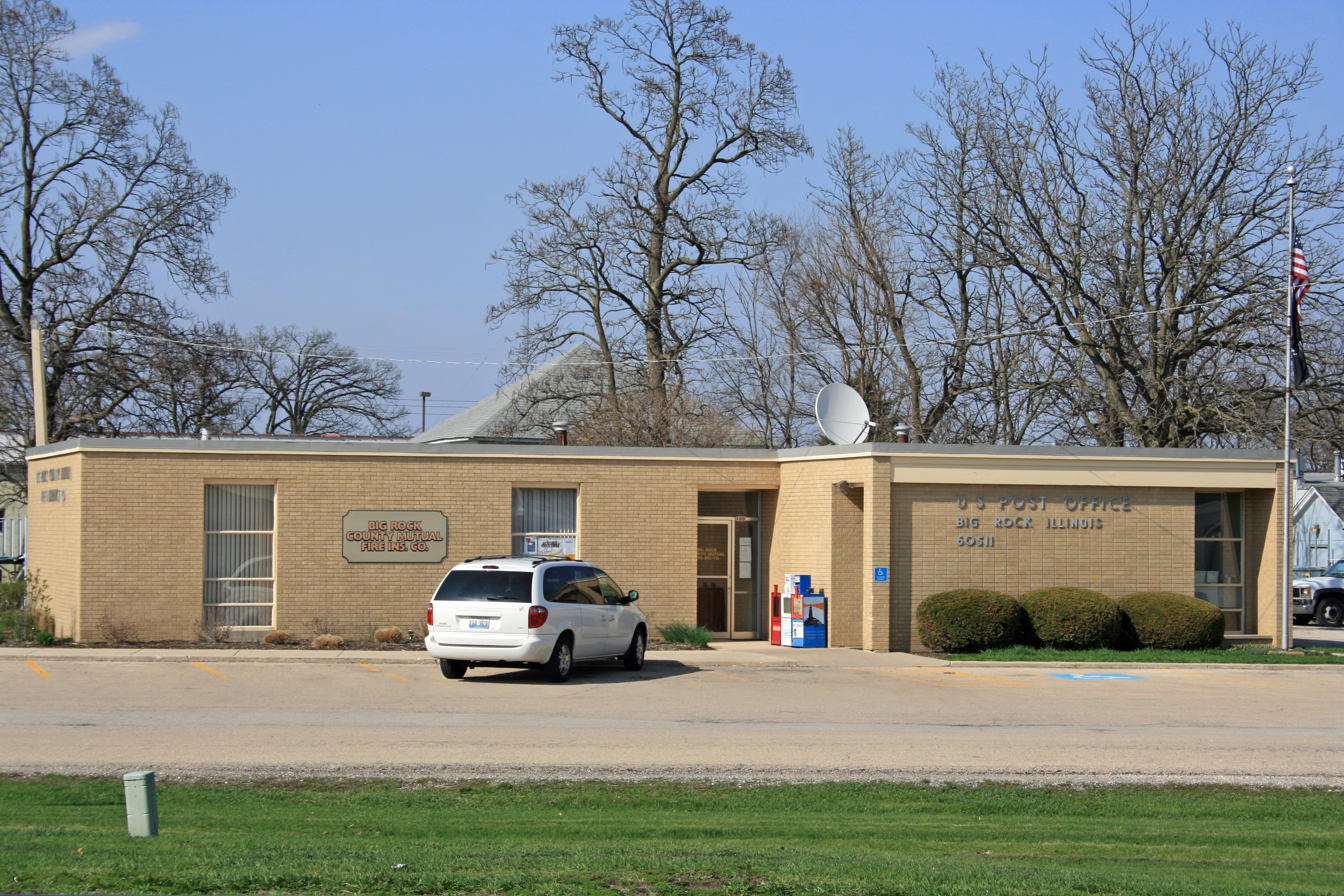
Big Rock post office

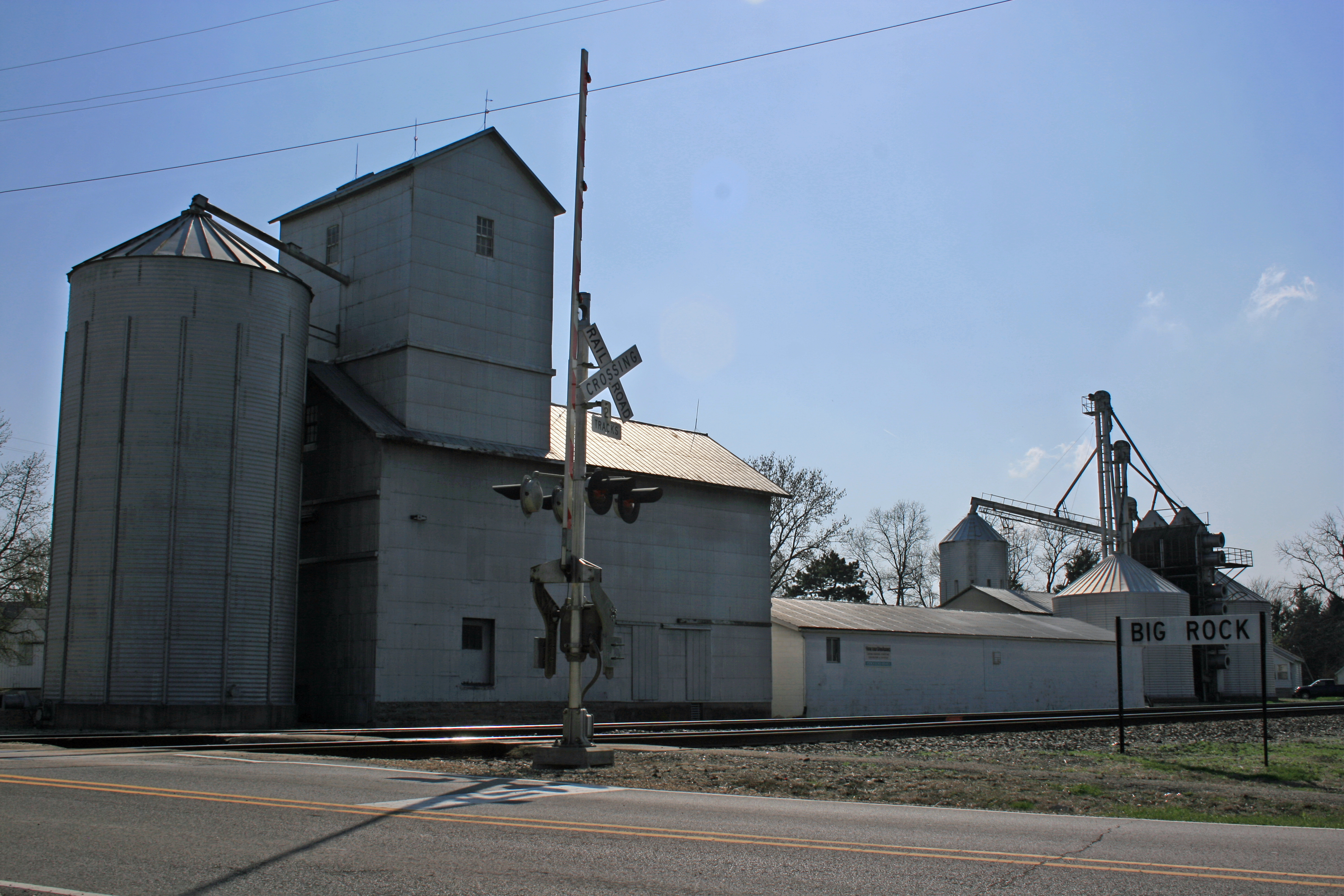
Big Rock grain elevator

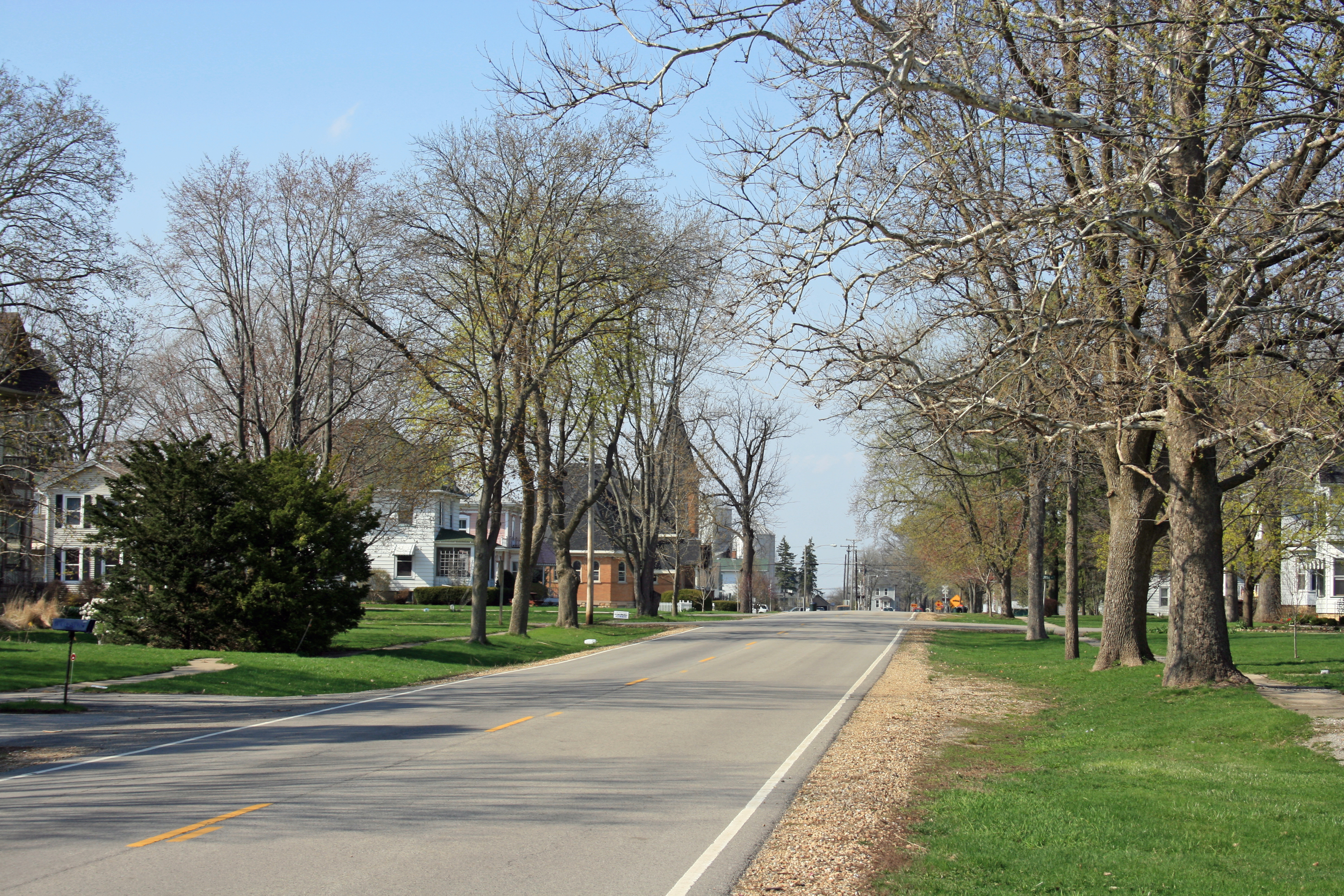
Downtown Big Rock

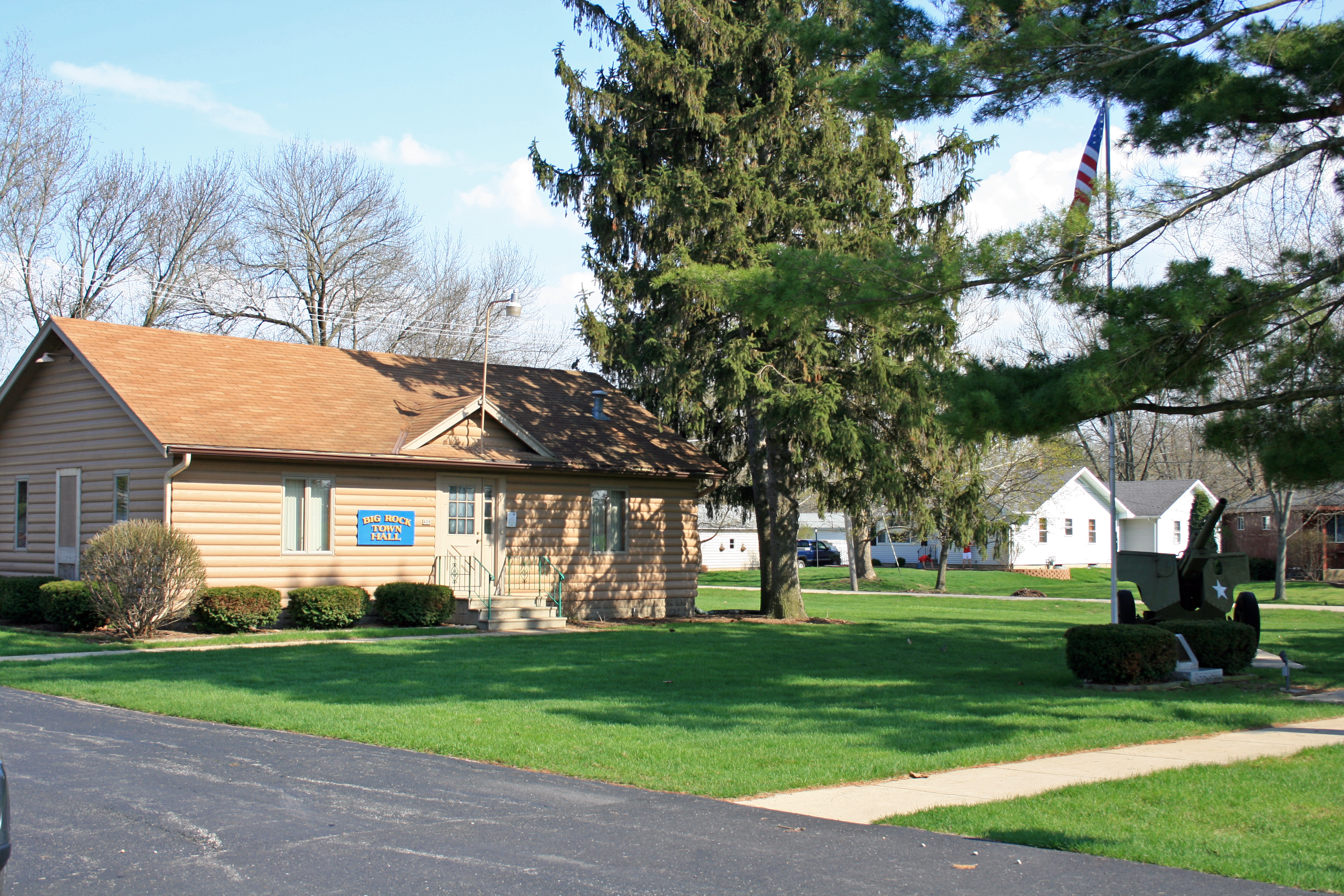
Big Rock town hall

== See also ==
- Big Rock Township, Kane County, Illinois
