= Waubonsee Community College =

Community college in Sugar Grove, Aurora, and Plano, Illinois, US

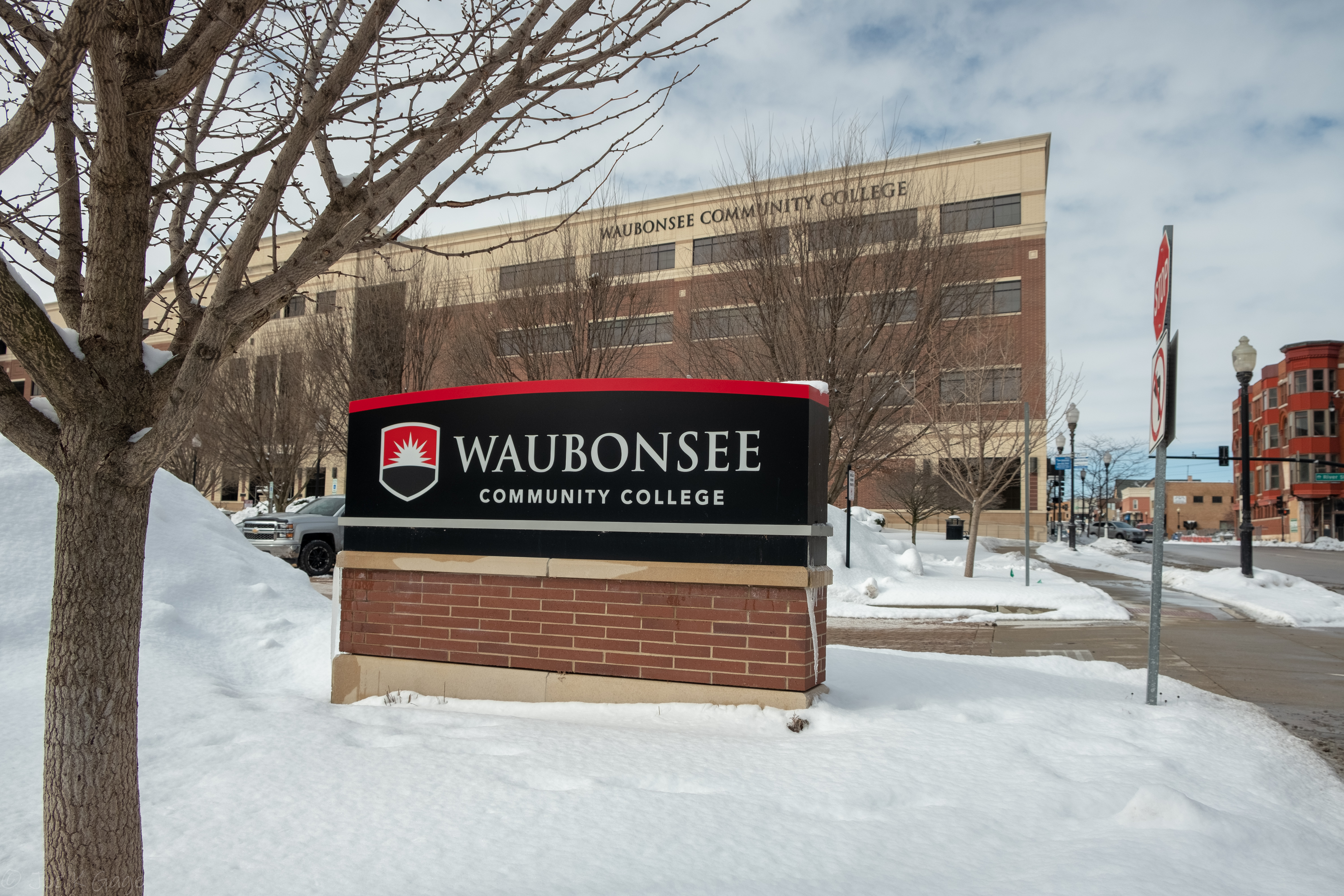
- Waubonsee Community College Aurora Campus
- Type: Public community college
- Established: 1966; 60 years ago
- President: Brian Knetl
- Faculty: 93 full-time and 324 part-time (Spring 2022)
- Students: 7,564 (all undergraduate)
- Location: Sugar Grove, Aurora, Plano, Illinois, United States; 41°47′49″N 88°27′30″W
- Website: www.waubonsee.edu

Waubonsee Community College is a public community college with four campuses in Illinois: the main campus in Sugar Grove, two campuses in Aurora (Aurora Downtown and Aurora Fox Valley, formerly known as the Copley Campus), and one in Plano. Founded in 1966, Waubonsee Community College serves twelve public school districts in Aurora, Batavia, Big Rock, Bristol, Elburn, Geneva, Hinckley, Kaneville, Leland, Maple Park, North Aurora, Plano, Sandwich, Somonauk, Oswego, Sugar Grove, and Yorkville.

== History ==
Founded in August 1966, Waubonsee Community College began shaping its infrastructure and curriculum in early 1967. To name the new institution, the college organized a district-wide contest. "Waubonsee," meaning "early dawn" or "early day," was chosen, honoring Chief Waubonsie, a Potawatomi chief who lived in the Fox River Valley in the 1800s.

=== Campus development ===
The college initially held classes at community facilities in September 1967, serving 1,603 students. A successful bond referendum in December 1967 facilitated the establishment of a permanent campus, which opened in Sugar Grove on a 243-acre site. This main campus has since expanded to include various educational and recreational facilities, including laboratories, a library, and a nature trail.

=== Campus expansion ===
In 1986, Waubonsee opened a second campus in downtown Aurora, later relocating in 2011 to a new 132,000-square-foot facility on River Street. This campus serves as a hub for adult education and community services, including GED programs, ESL courses, and the Illinois Small Business Development Center.

In January 1997, Waubonsee established the Aurora Fox Valley Campus, next to Copley Medical Center, which houses healthcare programs and offers general education courses. The Plano Campus, opened in 2011, recently evolved into the Innovation and Design Center, featuring programs in computer-aided design, cybersecurity, and welding.

=== Development initiatives ===
In the early 2000s, Waubonsee adopted its 2020 College Master Plan, resulting in new facilities on the Sugar Grove Campus, including a Science Building and a Student Center. The college also expanded its online offerings, providing nearly 200 courses and full associate degrees online.

In 2016, Waubonsee celebrated its 50th anniversary with a focus on the theme "Proud Past, Bold Future." As it advances, the college continues to prioritize student success through accessible and quality education.

== Academics ==
In addition to its primary campuses, the college also uses facilities in many communities as extension site locations. At these nearly forty sites, Waubonsee provides college credit courses, seminars for business and industry, workshops for personal enrichment, and programs for youth.

Delivery of instruction across the district has also expanded through distance learning and the college's video conferencing system. This system links Waubonsee's three academic sites, two area high schools and the Illinois Mathematics and Science Academy via a two-way interactive microwave network. Using fiber optics, the network also includes Judson University, Kishwaukee College, and McHenry County College, thus enhancing the academic programs offered by Waubonsee and the Fox Valley Educational Alliance (FVEA).

Waubonsee is a founding member of the Illinois Virtual Campus (IVC) and also provides courses to students statewide through Illinois Community Colleges Online (ILCCO). Waubonsee has the distinction of being an ILCCO grant recipient naming Waubonsee as the host institution and college responsible for the development and operation of the ILCCO Learning Academy. The Learning Academy provides training and support for Illinois community college educators in the development, design and delivery of online courses. Waubonsee offers more than 100 online courses and is one of a handful of higher education institutions in Illinois to offer fully accredited degrees to students in a distance learning format.

== Athletics ==
The nickname for the athletic department is the Chiefs. First year for the Chiefs athletics was 1967–68.

== Notable faculty ==
- David Voorhees – geologist
