= Big Rock Township, Illinois =

Big Rock Township
- Township
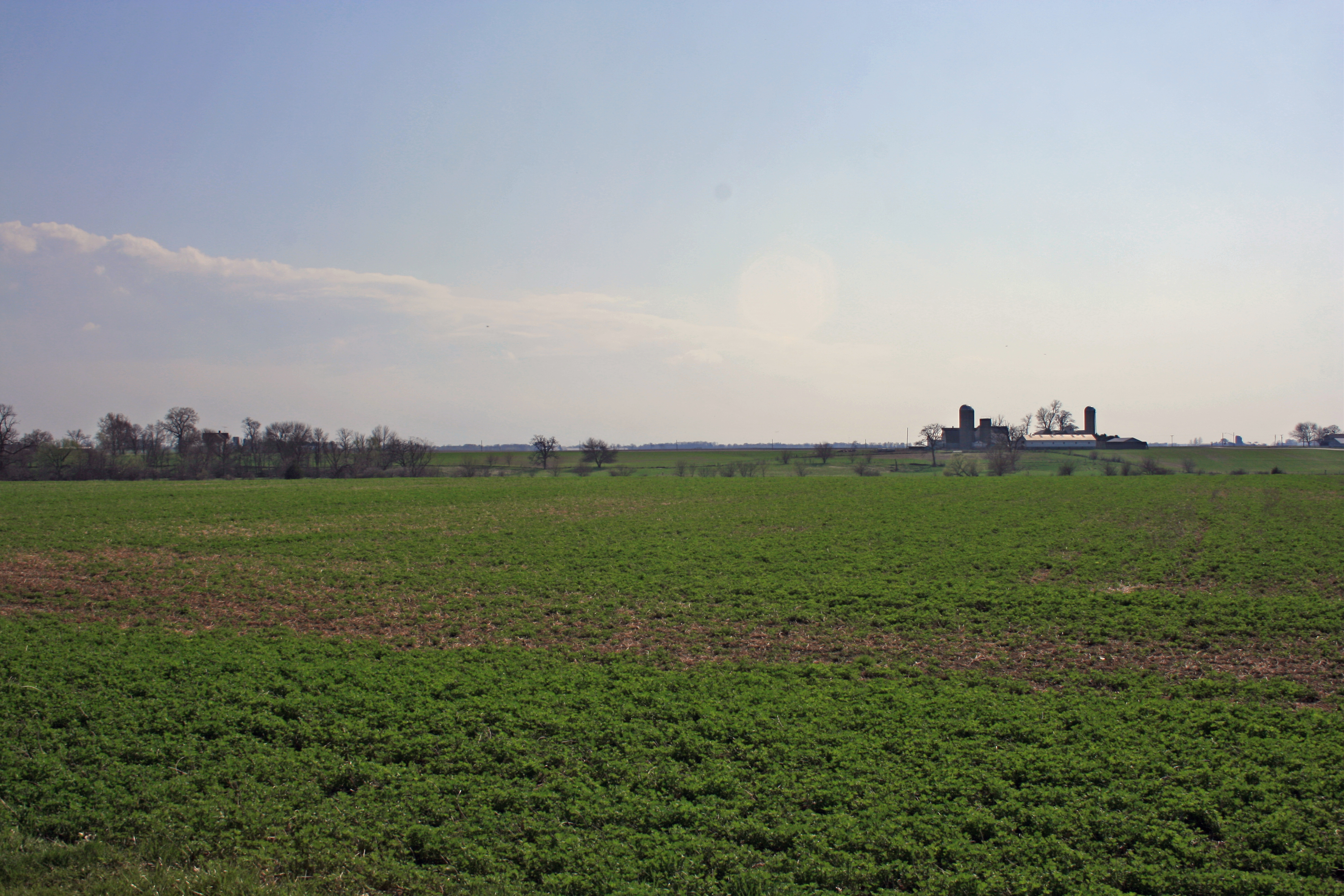

- Location in Kane County

- Kane County's location in Illinois
- Coordinates: 41°45′49″N 088°32′48″W
- Country: United States
- State: Illinois
- County: Kane
- Established: November 6, 1849

Area
  - Total: 35.15 sq mi (91.0 km^{2})
  - Land: 35.15 sq mi (91.0 km^{2})
  - Water: 0 sq mi (0 km^{2}) 0%
- Elevation: 709 ft (216 m)

Population (2020)
  - Total: 1,768
  - Density: 50.30/sq mi (19.42/km^{2})
- FIPS code: 17-089-05989
- GNIS feature ID: 0428673
- Website: bigrocktownship.com

Big Rock Township is located in Kane County, Illinois. As of the 2020 census, its population was 1,768 and it contained 706 housing units. Most of its land use is agricultural.

== Geography ==
According to the 2021 census gazetteer files, Big Rock Township has a total area of 35.15 square miles (91.04 km^{2}), all land.

U.S. Route 30 runs east to west through the township.

=== Cities and towns ===
- Big Rock
- Sugar Grove (small portion)

== Demographics ==
As of the 2020 census there were 1,768 people, 617 households, and 492 families residing in the township. The population density was 50.30 inhabitants per square mile (19.42/km^{2}). There were 706 housing units at an average density of 20.09 per square mile (7.76/km^{2}). The racial makeup of the township was 92.25% White, 0.17% African American, 0.57% Native American, 0.34% Asian, 0.00% Pacific Islander, 1.19% from other races, and 5.49% from two or more races. Hispanic or Latino of any race were 6.17% of the population.

There were 617 households, out of which 32.10% had children under the age of 18 living with them, 74.23% were married couples living together, 2.76% had a female householder with no spouse present, and 20.26% were non-families. 13.60% of all households were made up of individuals, and 3.90% had someone living alone who was 65 years of age or older. The average household size was 2.88 and the average family size was 3.24.

The township's age distribution consisted of 26.6% under the age of 18, 4.3% from 18 to 24, 26.5% from 25 to 44, 27.1% from 45 to 64, and 15.6% who were 65 years of age or older. The median age was 36.5 years. For every 100 females, there were 131.1 males. For every 100 females age 18 and over, there were 122.0 males.

The median income for a household in the township was $97,734, and the median income for a family was $103,636. Males had a median income of $59,904 versus $42,059 for females. The per capita income for the township was $41,960. About 2.8% of families and 2.0% of the population were below the poverty line, including none of those under age 18 and 5.1% of those age 65 or over.

Historical population
Census	Pop.	Note	%±
2000	1,957		—
2010	1,859		−5.0%
2020	1,768		−4.9%
U.S. Decennial Census

== Images ==
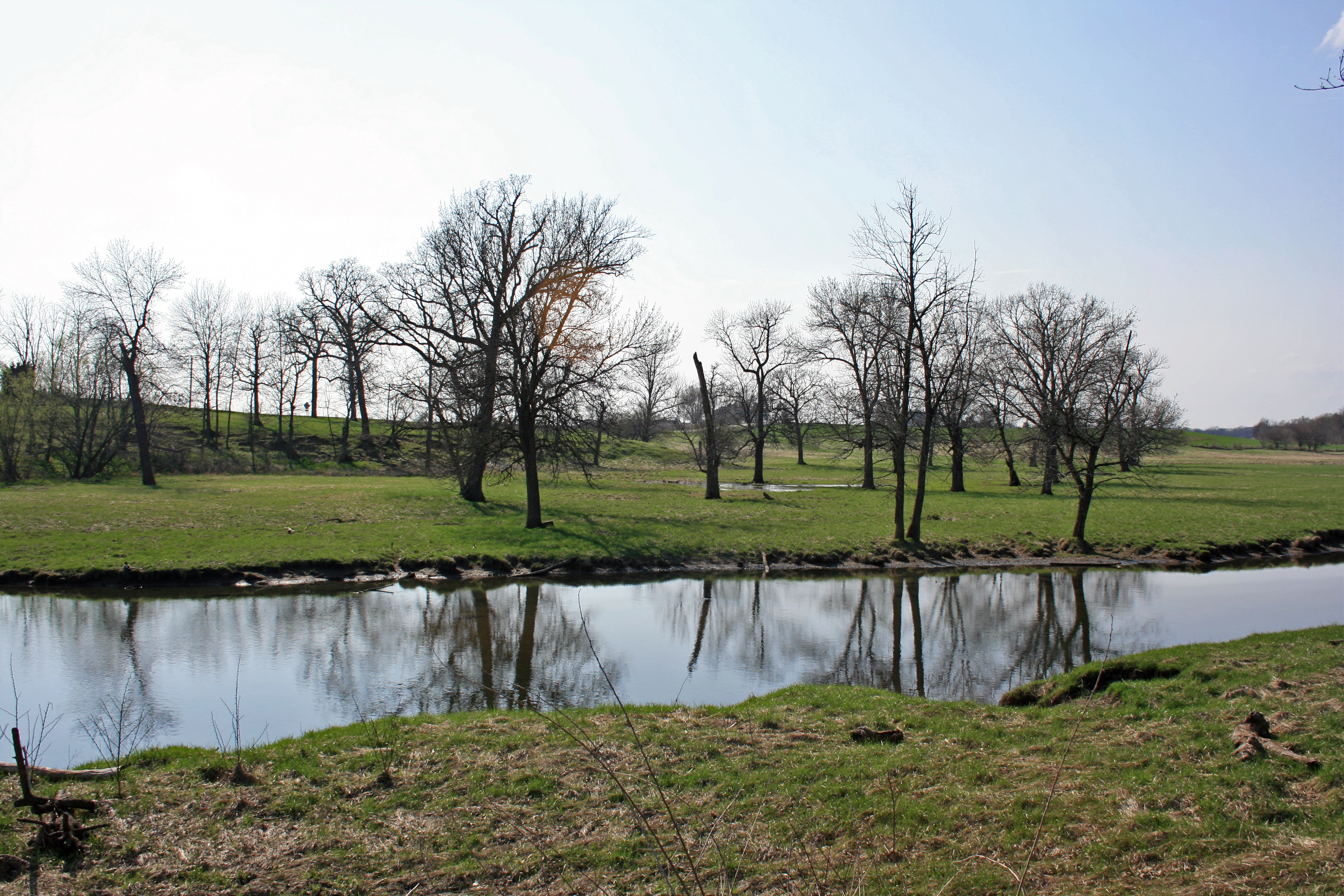
Big Rock Creek

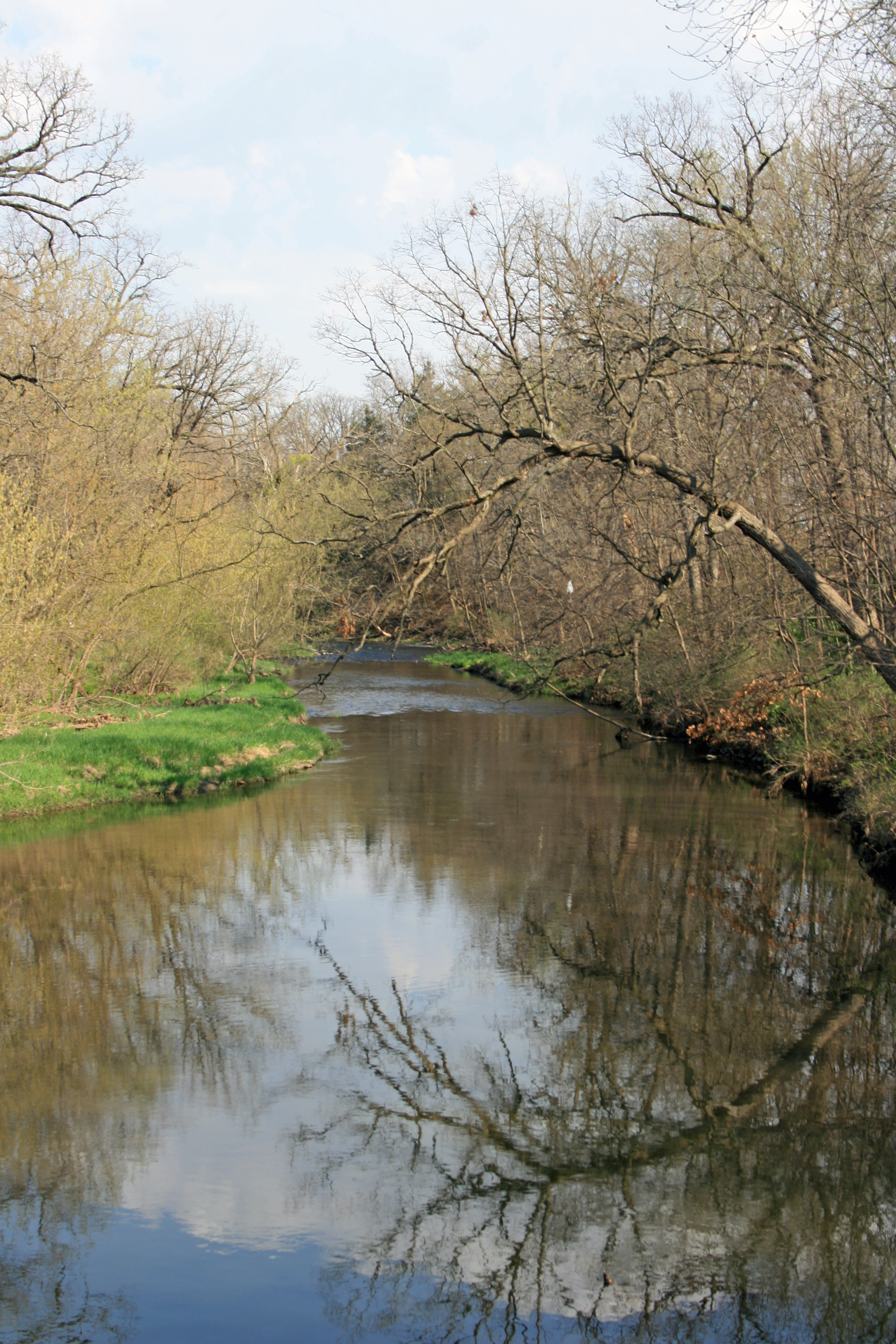
Big Rock Creek
