= List of people from Aurora, Illinois =

The following list includes notable people who were born or have lived in Aurora, Illinois. For a similar list organized alphabetically by last name, see the category page People from Aurora, Illinois.

== Arts and culture ==
=== Art and architecture ===
Name	Image	Birth	Death	Known for	Association	Reference
Ruth VanSickle Ford		Aug 8, 1897	Apr 18, 1989	Owner of the Chicago Academy of Fine Arts	Grew up in Aurora	
Frank Howell Holden		Jun 8, 1870	May 29, 1937	Architect	Grew up in Aurora	

=== Film, radio, and television ===
Name	Image	Birth	Death	Known for	Association	Reference
John Barrowman		Mar 11, 1967		Actor and singer	Father was employed in Aurora	
Cisco Cotto		Sep 22, 1975		Radio news anchor and pastor	Born in Aurora	
Kimberly Donley		Dec 15, 1965		Adult model and actress	Born in Aurora	
John Drury		Jan 4, 1927	Nov 25, 2007	Longtime Chicago news anchorman	Raised in Aurora	
Andrea Evans		Jun 18, 1957	Jul 9, 2023	Emmy-nominated actress	Born in Aurora	
Stana Katic		Apr 26, 1978		Actress, co-star of ABC's Castle	Attended West Aurora High School	
Jim McGuinn		Feb 13, 1966		Radio personality and program director	Born in Aurora	
Hayden Rolence				Actor	Lives in Aurora	
Paul Scheuring		Nov 20, 1968		Screenwriter and director	Born in Aurora	
Tom Skilling		Feb 20, 1952		Chicago Tribune and WGN-TV meteorologist	Born in Aurora	
Phillip Edward Van Lear				Actor	Born in Aurora	

=== Music ===
Name	Image	Birth	Death	Known for	Association	Reference
Jackie DeShannon		Aug 21, 1941		Singer-songwriter		
Gene Greene (a.k.a. The Ragtime King)		Jun 9, 1857	Apr 5, 1930	Entertainer, singer and composer	Born in Aurora	
Kenneth W. Griffin		Dec 28, 1909	Mar 11, 1956	Organist	Lived in Aurora and is buried there	
Dave Johnston				Banjoist, singer, Yonder Mountain String Band		
Jeff Olson		Jul 14, 1962		Musician	Raised in Aurora and taught music there	
Maud Powell		Aug 22, 1867	Jan 8, 1920	Violinist	Began violin and piano lessons in Aurora in 1874	
Carl Thomas		Jun 15, 1972		R&B singer	Attended East Aurora High School	
Ray White				Soul vocalist and rock and blues guitarist; member of Frank Zappa's touring ensembles		

=== Writing and journalism ===
Name	Image	Birth	Death	Known for	Association	Reference
Clive Cussler		Jul 15, 1931	Feb 24, 2020	Adventure novelist and marine archaeologist	Born in Aurora	
M. Miriam Herrera				Author and poet	Raised in Aurora	
Thom Jones		Jan 26, 1945		Short story writer	Raised in Aurora	
Elizabeth Linington		Mar 11, 1921	Apr 5, 1988	Prolific novelist	Born in Aurora	
Mabel O'Donnell		1890	1985	Wrote the Alice and Jerry basal reader series	Attended East Aurora High School	
Vernon Louis Parrington		Aug 3, 1871	Jun 16, 1929	Pulitzer Prize-winning historian; college football coach	Born in Aurora	
Nicole Peeler		1978		Novelist	Born in Aurora	
Mary Foot Seymour		1846	Mar 21, 1893	New York journalist, business woman, school founder	Born in Aurora	
Randy Shilts		Aug 8, 1951	Feb 17, 1994	Pioneering gay journalist and author		
Valerie Taylor		Sep 7, 1913	Oct 22, 1997	Author of lesbian pulp fiction novels and poetry	Born in Aurora	

== Business and administrative ==
Name	Image	Birth	Death	Known for	Association	Reference
James Compton		Apr 7, 1939		Former president and CEO of the Chicago Urban League	Born in Aurora	
Jeffrey Skilling		Nov 25, 1953		Former CEO of Enron Corporation	Attended West Aurora High School	

== Law and crime ==
Name	Image	Birth	Death	Known for	Association	Reference
Pericles Abassi		1984		Lawyer and online personality	Born in Aurora	
Rita B. Garman		Nov 19, 1943		Justice of the Supreme Court of Illinois	Born in Aurora	
Edna Murray		1898	1966	Depression-era outlaw		
Roy Solfisburg		1912	1991	Chief justice of the Illinois Supreme Court	Born in Aurora	

== Military ==
Name	Image	Birth	Death	Known for	Association	Reference
James H. Monroe		Oct 17, 1944	Feb 16, 1967	Combat medic in the Vietnam War and recipient of the Medal of Honor	Born in Aurora	
Walter E. Truemper		Oct 31, 1918	Feb 20, 1944	Member of the U.S. Army Air Forces in World War II and recipient of the Medal of Honor	Born in Aurora	
Lester W. Weber		Jul 30, 1948	Feb 23, 1969	U.S. Marine and recipient of the Medal of Honor for heroism in Vietnam	Born in Aurora	

== Politics ==
Name	Image	Birth	Death	Known for	Association	Reference
Mark Catlin, Sr.		Nov 12, 1882	May 16, 1956	State legislator, Wisconsin; head football coach at University of Iowa	Born in Aurora	
Thomas E. Coleman		Feb 23, 1893	Feb 4, 1964	Chairman of the Republican Party of Wisconsin	Born in Aurora	
Ira Clifton Copley		Oct 25, 1864	Nov 1, 1947	U.S. congressman and founder of Copley		
Michael J. Davis		Jul 21, 1947		Chief justice of the U.S. District Court for the District of Minnesota	Raised in Aurora	
Suzanne Deuchler		Jul 21, 1929	Jun 24, 2022	Illinois state congresswoman	Lived and died in Aurora	
Charles Henry Dietrich		Nov 26, 1853	Apr 10, 1924	U.S. senator from and 11th governor of Nebraska	Born in Aurora	
Matt Hanson		May 17, 1973		State representative	Lived in Aurora	
Dennis Hastert		Jan 2, 1942	Oct 3, 2026	Speaker of the U.S. House of Representatives	Born in Aurora	
Phillip E. Johnson		Jun 18, 1940	Nov 2, 2019	Retired law professor and author	Born in Aurora	
Chris Lauzen		Dec 30, 1952		Illinois state senator	Born in Aurora	
Linda Chapa LaVia		Aug 16, 1966		Illinois state congressman	Born in Aurora	
Patricia Reid Lindner		Nov 29, 1939		Illinois state congressman	Born in Aurora	
Lewis M. Long		Jun 22, 1883	Sep 9, 1957	U.S. congressman	Attended schools in Aurora	
Tim Mahoney		Aug 16, 1956		U.S. congressman from Florida	Born in Aurora	
Scott B. Palmer		Nov 22, 1950		Former chief of staff to U.S. congressman Dennis Hastert	Attended Aurora University	
Robert W. Pritchard		Mar 31, 1945		Illinois state congressman	Born in Aurora	
Charlotte Thompson Reid		Sep 27, 1913	Jan 25, 2007	U.S. congresswoman	Lived and died in Aurora	
Frank R. Reid		Apr 18, 1879	Jan 25, 1945	U.S. congressman	Born in Aurora	
Tom Weisner		1949	2018	Mayor of Aurora		

== Religion ==
Name	Image	Birth	Death	Known for	Association	Reference
Nathaniel Popp		Jun 12, 1940		Archbishop of the Orthodox Church in America's Romanian Episcopate	Born in Aurora	
Vasile Louis Puscas		Sep 13, 1915	Oct 3, 2009	Bishop emeritus of the Romanian Catholic Eparchy of St George's in Canton	Born in Aurora	
Alexander Raţiu		May 4, 1916	Jul 25, 2002	Romanian Greek-Catholic priest, political prisoner, and author	Lived and died in Aurora	

== Science ==
Name	Image	Birth	Death	Known for	Association	Reference
Henry Gale		Sep 12, 1874	Nov 16, 1942	Astrophysicist and author	Born in Aurora	
Frank Haven Hall		Feb 9, 1841	1911	Inventor of the Hall Braille Writer and other Braille printing devices	Lived and died in Aurora	
James F. Phillips		Nov 20, 1930	Oct 3, 2001	Environmental activist	Born in Aurora	
Martha E. Sloan		1939		Electrical engineer, the first female president of the IEEE	Born in Aurora	
G. David Tilman		Jul 22, 1949		Ecologist and college professor	Born in Aurora	

== Sports ==
=== Baseball ===
Name	Image	Birth	Death	Known for	Association	Reference
Rich Becker		Feb 1, 1972		Outfielder for several Major League Baseball teams	Born in Aurora	
Michael Bowden		Sep 9, 1986		Pitcher for the Boston Red Sox and Chicago Cubs	Attended Waubonsie Valley High School	
Mark Grant		Oct 24, 1963		Pitcher for six Major League Baseball teams	Born in Aurora	
Bob Johnson		Apr 25, 1943		Pitcher for five Major League Baseball teams	Born in Aurora	
Ken Jungels		Jun 23, 1916	Sep 9, 1975	Pitcher for Cleveland Indians and Pittsburgh Pirates	Born in Aurora	
Bob Kipper		Jul 8, 1964		Relief pitcher for California Angels, Pittsburgh Pirates, Minnesota Twins	Born in Aurora	
Mario Ramos		Oct 19, 1977		Pitcher for Texas Rangers	Born in Aurora	
Jim Reninger		Mar 7, 1915	Aug 23, 1993	Pitcher for Philadelphia Athletics	Born in Aurora	

=== Basketball ===
Name	Image	Birth	Death	Known for	Association	Reference
Kenny Battle		Oct 10, 1964		Small forward for several NBA teams	Born in Aurora	
Ryan Boatright		Dec 27, 1992		Point guard, UConn 2014 National Championship team	Born in Aurora	
Bob Carney		Aug 3, 1932	Nov 9, 2011	Shooting guard for the Minneapolis Lakers	Born in Aurora	
Bob Lavoy		Jun 29, 1926	Dec 18, 2010	NBA player of early 1950s	Born in Aurora	
John Mauer		Sep 4, 1901	Dec 20, 1978	Basketball head coach, Kentucky, Tennessee, Florida	Born in Aurora	
Jim Platt		Mar 1, 1952		College basketball assistant and head coach	Born in Aurora	

=== Football ===
Name	Image	Birth	Death	Known for	Association	Reference
Marger Apsit		Jun 5, 1909	Dec 22, 1988	Running back for four National Football League teams	Born in Aurora	
Kurt Becker		Dec 22, 1958		Guard for Chicago Bears and Los Angeles Rams; Super Bowl XX champion	Born in Aurora	
Don Beebe		Dec 18, 1964		Wide receiver for Buffalo Bills, Carolina Panthers, and Green Bay Packers; Super Bowl XXXI champion	Born in Aurora; head football coach at Aurora Christian and later at Aurora University	
Brad Childress		Jun 27, 1956		Pro and college football coach, head coach of Minnesota Vikings 2006–10	Born in Aurora	
Larry English		Jan 22, 1986		Linebacker for San Diego Chargers and Tampa Bay Buccaneers	Born in Aurora	
Ralph Galloway		Aug 27, 1946		Guard in Canadian Football League 1969–79	Born in Aurora	
Andy Gustafson		Apr 3, 1903	Jan 7, 1979	Head coach in College Football Hall of Fame	Born in Aurora	
Roy Horstmann		Dec 6, 1910	Jan 23, 1998	Running back for Boston Redskins and Chicago Cardinals	Born in Aurora	
Joe Krakoski		Nov 11, 1962		Linebacker for Washington Redskins	Born in Aurora	
Randy Melvin		Apr 3, 1959		Defensive line coach for Cleveland Browns	Born in Aurora	
Andy Sabados		Nov 24, 1916	Jul 5, 2004	Guard for NFL's Chicago Cardinals	Born in Aurora	
Steve Thompson		Jun 24, 1965		Defensive tackle for Washington Redskins	Born in Aurora	

=== Golf ===
Name	Image	Birth	Death	Known for	Association	Reference
Mike Small		Mar 4, 1966		College coach and PGA Tour player	Born in Aurora	

=== Gymnastics ===
Name	Image	Birth	Death	Known for	Association	Reference
Anna Li		Sep 4, 1988		Artistic gymnast; member of the U.S. National Team; alternate at the Summer 2012 London Olympics	Graduated from Waubonsie Valley High School; lives in Aurora	

=== Ice Hockey ===
Name	Image	Birth	Death	Known for	Association	Reference
Lyndie Lobdell		Sep 1, 2002		Professional ice hockey defenseman for the Seattle Torrent	Born in Aurora	

=== Sports-related professionals ===
Name	Image	Birth	Death	Known for	Association	Reference
Zachary Taylor Davis		May 26, 1872	Dec 16, 1946	Architect of Old Comiskey Park (1910), Wrigley Field (1914)	Born in Aurora	
Chick Hearn		Nov 27, 1916	Aug 5, 2002	Sportscaster for the Los Angeles Lakers	Born in Aurora	

=== Soccer ===
Name	Image	Birth	Death	Known for	Association	Reference
Wyatt Borso		Mar 8, 2004		Forward	Hometown	
Derek Dodson		Nov 3, 1998		Forward	Born in Aurora	
Quavas Kirk		Apr 13, 1988		Defender and forward	Born in Aurora	

=== Track and field ===
Name	Image	Birth	Death	Known for	Association	Reference
Tom Petranoff		Apr 8, 1958		World record javelin thrower	Born in Aurora	

=== Wrestling ===
Name	Image	Birth	Death	Known for	Association	Reference
Izzy Martinez		Apr 23, 1982		Wrestling coach and COO of Real American Freestyle	Born in Aurora	
