= Prestbury, Illinois =

- Census-designated place
- Location in Kane County and the state of Illinois.
- Coordinates: 41°47′05″N 88°25′21″W
- Country: United States
- State: Illinois
- County: Kane

Area
  - Total: 0.66 sq mi (1.71 km^{2})
  - Land: 0.63 sq mi (1.62 km^{2})
  - Water: 0.035 sq mi (0.09 km^{2})
- Elevation: 709 ft (216 m)

Population (2020)
  - Total: 1,657
  - Density: 2,647.8/sq mi (1,022.32/km^{2})
- Time zone: UTC-6 (Central (CST))
  - Summer (DST): UTC-5 (CDT)
- Area codes: 630 & 331
- GNIS feature ID: 2629860
- FIPS code: 17-61821

Prestbury is a census-designated place in Kane County, Illinois, United States. Per the 2020 census, the population was 1,657. Prestbury first appeared as a census-designated place in the 2010 U.S. census.

== Geography ==
According to the 2021 census gazetteer files, Prestbury has a total area of 0.66 square miles (1.71 km^{2}), of which 0.63 square miles (1.63 km^{2}) (or 94.70%) is land and 0.04 square miles (0.10 km^{2}) (or 5.30%) is water.

== Demographics ==
Historical population
Census	Pop.	Note	%±
2010	1,722		—
2020	1,657		−3.8%
U.S. Decennial Census; 2010 2020

=== Racial and ethnic composition ===
Prestbury CDP, Illinois – Racial and ethnic composition Note: the US Census treats Hispanic/Latino as an ethnic category. This table excludes Latinos from the racial categories and assigns them to a separate category. Hispanics/Latinos may be of any race.
Race / Ethnicity (NH = Non-Hispanic)	Pop 2010	Pop 2020	% 2010	% 2020
White alone (NH)	1,572	1,456	91.29%	87.87%
Black or African American alone (NH)	26	16	1.51%	0.97%
Native American or Alaska Native alone (NH)	0	1	0.00%	0.06%
Asian alone (NH)	29	14	1.68%	0.84%
Pacific Islander alone (NH)	0	0	0.00%	0.00%
Other race alone (NH)	0	1	0.00%	0.06%
Mixed race or Multiracial (NH)	7	49	0.41%	2.96%
Hispanic or Latino (any race)	88	120	5.11%	7.24%
Total	1,722	1,657	100.00%	100.00%

=== 2020 census ===
As of the 2020 census, Prestbury had a population of 1,657 and 530 families. The population density was 2,506.81 inhabitants per square mile (967.88/km^{2}). There were 741 housing units at an average density of 1,121.03 per square mile (432.83/km^{2}).

The median age was 59.9 years. 14.2% of residents were under the age of 18 and 40.4% of residents were 65 years of age or older. For every 100 females there were 89.2 males, and for every 100 females age 18 and over there were 87.1 males age 18 and over.

100.0% of residents lived in urban areas, while 0.0% lived in rural areas.

There were 722 households in Prestbury, of which 17.2% had children under the age of 18 living in them. Of all households, 68.6% were married-couple households, 8.3% were households with a male householder and no spouse or partner present, and 20.5% were households with a female householder and no spouse or partner present. About 23.1% of all households were made up of individuals and 17.2% had someone living alone who was 65 years of age or older.

Of all housing units, 2.6% were vacant. The homeowner vacancy rate was 1.0% and the rental vacancy rate was 0.0%.

=== Income and poverty ===
The median income for a household in the CDP was $112,155, and the median income for a family was $135,625. Males had a median income of $135,699 versus $21,797 for females. The per capita income for the CDP was $53,360. None of the population was below the poverty line.
