= Charles McGavin =

American politician (1874–1940)

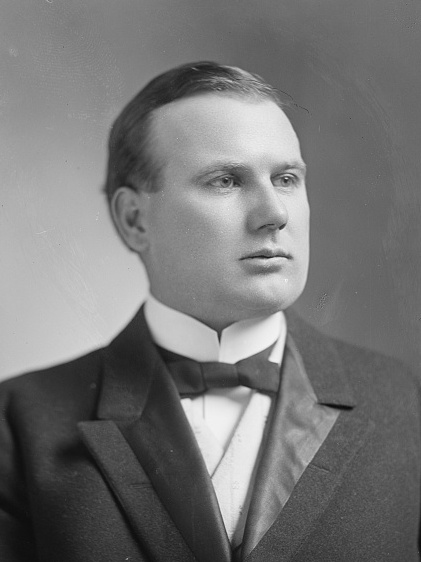
- Portrait of McGavin by Charles Milton Bell, taken between March 1905 and August 1906

Member of the U.S. House of Representatives from Illinois's 8th district
- In office March 4, 1905 – March 3, 1909
- Preceded by: William F. Mahoney
- Succeeded by: Thomas Gallagher

Personal details
- Born: January 10, 1874 Riverton, Illinois, US
- Died: December 17, 1940 (aged 66) Chicago, Illinois, US
- Resting place: Mount Auburn Cemetery
- Party: Republican
- Occupation: Politician, lawyer

Charles McGavin (January 10, 1874 – December 17, 1940) was an American politician and lawyer. A Republican, he was a member of the United States House of Representatives from Illinois.

== Biography ==
McGavin was born on January 10, 1874, in Riverton, Illinois, the son of James McGavin and Mary Ann (née Farley) McGavin. He was educated at common schools in Springfield, graduating high school in Mount Olive. He read law, and in 1897, was admitted to the bar, after which he practiced law in Springfield for two years. In 1899, he moved to Chicago, practicing there in the Herner & Waters partnership. He was the city assistant attorney in 1903 and 1904. He was also a coal mining superintendent.

McGavin was a Republican. He was a member of the United States House of Representatives from March 4, 1905, to March 3, 1909, representing Illinois's 8th district. He was the youngest person elected to the district at the time. In his first election, he was thought to have lost to Stanley H. Kunz, though won with a plurality of 85. He left Congress in order to run for judge of the Illinois Municipal Court. He was later a delegate to the 1920 Republican National Convention. Politically, he leaned liberal, his Congressional tenure have come during the Presidency of Theodore Roosevelt.

After serving in Congress, McGavin returned to practicing law in Chicago. From 1912 to 1915, he practiced in Los Angeles, afterward returning to Chicago. He retired c. 1932. He was Presbyterian. He died on December 17, 1940, aged 66, in Chicago, and was buried at Mount Auburn Cemetery, in Harvard.

U.S. House of Representatives
Preceded by William F. Mahoney	Member of the U.S. House of Representatives from Illinois's 8th congressional district March 4, 1905 - March 3, 1909	Succeeded by Thomas Gallagher
