= Illinois's 8th congressional district =

U.S. House district for Illinois

Coordinates: 42°00′35″N 88°05′48″W

- Interactive map of district boundaries since January 3, 2023
- Representative: Raja Krishnamoorthi; D–Schaumburg
- Area: 291.5 mi^{2} (755 km^{2})
- Distribution: 100.0% urban; 0.0% rural
- Population (2025): 740,781
- Median household income: $101,497
- Ethnicity: 54.4% White; 23.8% Hispanic; 14.3% Asian; 4.3% Black; 2.8% Two or more races; 0.5% other
- Cook PVI: D+5

The 8th congressional district of Illinois is a congressional district in the U.S. state of Illinois that has been represented by Democrat Raja Krishnamoorthi since 2017.

== History ==
=== 2011 redistricting ===
The congressional district covers parts of Cook County, DuPage County and Kane County, as of the 2011 redistricting which followed the 2010 United States census. All or parts of Addison, Arlington Heights, Barrington Hills, Bloomingdale, Carol Stream, Carpentersville, East Dundee, Elgin, Elk Grove Village, Glendale Heights, Hanover Park, Hoffman Estates, Lombard, Palatine, Rolling Meadows, Roselle, Schaumburg, South Elgin, Streamwood, Villa Park and Wood Dale are included. These boundaries became effective on January 3, 2013.

== Composition ==
For the 118th and successive Congresses (based on redistricting following the 2020 census), the district contains all or portions of the following counties, townships, and municipalities:

Cook County (25)

Arlington Heights (part, also 5th and 9th), Barrington Hills (part, also 5th; shared with Kane, Lake, and McHenry counties), Barrington Township (part, also 5th), Bartlett (part, also 3rd; shared with DuPage County), Chicago (part, also 1st, 2nd, 3rd, 4th, 5th, 6th, 7th, and 9th; shared with DuPage County), Deer Park (part, also 5th; shared with Lake County), Des Plaines (part, also 3rd, 5th, and 9th), East Dundee (part, shared with Kane County), Elgin (part, also 3rd; shared with Kane County), Elk Grove Township (part, also 3rd and 5th; shared with DuPage County), Elk Grove Village (part, also 3rd; shared with DuPage County), Hanover Park (part, also 3rd; shared with DuPage County), Hanover Township (part, also 3rd), Hoffman Estates (part, also 5th), Inverness (part, also 5th), Mount Prospect (part, also 5th), Norridge (part, also 5th), Palatine (part, also 5th), Palatine Township (part, also 5th), Rolling Meadows (part, also 5th), Roselle (part, shared with DuPage County), Rosemont (part, also 5th), Schaumburg (part, also 5th; shared with DuPage County), Streamwood (part, also 3rd), South Barrington (part, also 5th)

DuPage County (15)

Addison (part, also 3rd), Addison Township (part, also 3rd), Bartlett (part, also 3rd; shared with Cook County), Bloomingdale, Bloomingdale Township (part, also 3rd), Carol Stream (part, also 3rd), Elk Grove Village (part, also 3rd; shared with DuPage County), Hanover Park (part, also 3rd; shared with Cook County), Itasca, Glendale Heights (part, also 3rd), Glen Ellyn (part, also 3rd and 6th), Milton Township (part, also 3rd and 6th), Roselle (part, shared with Cook County), Wayne Township (part, also 3rd), Wood Dale (part, also 3rd)

Kane County (21)

Algonquin (part, also 9th; shared with McHenry County), Barrington Hills (part, also 5th; shared with Cook, Lake, and McHenry counties), Batavia (part, also 11th), Carpentersville, Dundee Township, East Dundee (part, shared with Cook County), Elgin (part, also 3rd; shared with Cook County), Elgin Township (part, also 11th), Geneva (part, also 11th), Geneva Township (part, also 11th), Gilberts, Hampshire (part, also 11th), Huntley (part, also 11th; shared with McHenry County), Pingree Grove, Rutland Township (part, also 11th), Sleepy Hollow, South Elgin, St. Charles (part, also 11th), St. Charles Township (part, also 11th), Wayne (part, also 3rd; shared with DuPage County), West Dundee

Chicago neighborhoods in the 8th district include:

- O'Hare (part)

== Recent election results from statewide races ==
Year	Office	Results
2008	President	Obama 59% - 40%
2012	President	Obama 55% - 45%
2016	President	Clinton 55% - 39%
2016	Senate	Duckworth 52% - 42%
2016	Comptroller (Spec.)	Munger 48% - 45%
2018	Governor	Pritzker 51% - 43%
2018	Attorney General	Raoul 53% - 44%
2018	Secretary of State	White 66% - 31%
2018	Comptroller	Mendoza 58% - 39%
2018	Treasurer	Frerichs 54% - 42%
2020	President	Biden 57% - 41%
2020	Senate	Durbin 55% - 40%
2022	Senate	Duckworth 56% - 42%
2022	Governor	Pritzker 55% - 42%
2022	Attorney General	Raoul 55% - 43%
2022	Secretary of State	Giannoulias 55% - 43%
2022	Comptroller	Mendoza 56% - 42%
2022	Treasurer	Frerichs 53% - 44%
2024	President	Harris 52% - 45%

== List of members representing the district ==
Name	Party	Years	Cong– ress	Electoral history	Counties
District created March 4, 1853.
William Henry Bissell (Belleville)	Independent; Democratic	March 4, 1853 – March 3, 1855	33rd	Redistricted from the 1st district and re-elected in 1852. Retired.	1853–1863 [data missing]
Vacant		March 4, 1855 – November 4, 1856	34th	Representative-elect Lyman Trumbull was elected to the U.S. Senate on February 8, 1855.	1853–1863 [data missing]
James L. D. Morrison (McLeansboro)	Democratic	November 4, 1856 – March 3, 1857	34th	Elected to finish Trumbull's term. Retired.	1853–1863 [data missing]
Robert Smith (Alton)	Democratic	March 4, 1857 – March 3, 1859	35th	Elected in 1856. Lost renomination.	1853–1863 [data missing]
Philip B. Fouke (Belleville)	Democratic	March 4, 1859 – March 3, 1863	36th 37th	Elected in 1858. Re-elected in 1860. Retired.	1853–1863 [data missing]
John T. Stuart (Springfield)	Democratic	March 4, 1863 – March 3, 1865	38th	Elected in 1862. Lost re-election.	1863–1873; DeWitt, Livingston, Logan, McLean, Sangamon, Tazewell, and Woodford
Shelby Moore Cullom (Springfield)	Republican	March 4, 1865 – March 3, 1871	39th 40th 41st	Elected in 1864. Re-elected in 1866. Re-elected in 1868. Retired.	1863–1873; DeWitt, Livingston, Logan, McLean, Sangamon, Tazewell, and Woodford
James Carroll Robinson (Springfield)	Democratic	March 4, 1871 – March 3, 1873	42nd	Elected in 1870. Redistricted to the 12th district.	1863–1873; DeWitt, Livingston, Logan, McLean, Sangamon, Tazewell, and Woodford
Greenbury L. Fort (Lacon)	Republican	March 4, 1873 – March 3, 1881	43rd 44th 45th 46th	Elected in 1872. Re-elected in 1874. Re-elected in 1876. Re-elected in 1878. Retired.	1873–1883; Ford, Iroquois, Kankakee, Livingston, Marshall, and Woodford
Lewis E. Payson (Pontiac)	Republican	March 4, 1881 – March 3, 1883	47th	Elected in 1880. Redistricted to the 9th district.	1873–1883; Ford, Iroquois, Kankakee, Livingston, Marshall, and Woodford
William Cullen (Ottawa)	Republican	March 4, 1883 – March 3, 1885	48th	Redistricted from the 7th district and re-elected in 1882. Lost renomination.	1883–1895; DuPage, Grundy, Kendall, LaSalle, and Will
Ralph Plumb (Streator)	Republican	March 4, 1885 – March 3, 1889	49th 50th	Elected in 1884. Re-elected in 1886. Retired.	1883–1895; DuPage, Grundy, Kendall, LaSalle, and Will
Charles A. Hill (Joliet)	Republican	March 4, 1889 – March 3, 1891	51st	Elected in 1888. Lost re-election.	1883–1895; DuPage, Grundy, Kendall, LaSalle, and Will
Lewis Steward (Plano)	Democratic	March 4, 1891 – March 3, 1893	52nd	Elected in 1890. Lost re-election.	1883–1895; DuPage, Grundy, Kendall, LaSalle, and Will
Robert A. Childs (Hinsdale)	Republican	March 4, 1893 – March 3, 1895	53rd	Elected in 1892. Retired.	1883–1895; DuPage, Grundy, Kendall, LaSalle, and Will
Albert J. Hopkins (Aurora)	Republican	March 4, 1895 – March 3, 1903	54th 55th 56th 57th	Redistricted from the 5th district and re-elected in 1894. Re-elected in 1896. Re-elected in 1898. Re-elected in 1900. Retired to run for U.S. senator.	1895–1903; DeKalb, DuPage, Grundy, Kane, Kendall, and McHenry
William F. Mahoney (Chicago)	Democratic	March 4, 1903 – December 27, 1904	58th	Redistricted from the 5th district and re-elected in 1902. Died.	1903–1913; Cook
Vacant		December 27, 1904 – March 3, 1905	58th		1903–1913; Cook
Charles McGavin (Chicago)	Republican	March 4, 1905 – March 3, 1909	59th 60th	Elected in 1904. Re-elected in 1906. Retired.	1903–1913; Cook
Thomas Gallagher (Chicago)	Democratic	March 4, 1909 – March 3, 1921	61st 62nd 63rd 64th 65th 66th	Elected in 1908. Re-elected in 1910. Re-elected in 1912. Re-elected in 1914. Re-elected in 1916. Re-elected in 1918. Retired.	1903–1913; Cook
Thomas Gallagher (Chicago)	Democratic	March 4, 1909 – March 3, 1921	61st 62nd 63rd 64th 65th 66th	Elected in 1908. Re-elected in 1910. Re-elected in 1912. Re-elected in 1914. Re-elected in 1916. Re-elected in 1918. Retired.	1913–1949; Cook
Stanley H. Kunz (Chicago)	Democratic	March 4, 1921 – March 3, 1931	67th 68th 69th 70th 71st	Elected in 1920. Re-elected in 1922. Re-elected in 1924. Re-elected in 1926. Re-elected in 1928. Lost re-election.	1913–1949; Cook
Peter C. Granata (Chicago)	Republican	March 4, 1931 – April 5, 1932	72nd	Lost contested election.	1913–1949; Cook
Stanley H. Kunz (Chicago)	Democratic	April 5, 1932 – March 3, 1933	72nd	Won contested election. Lost renomination.	1913–1949; Cook
Leo Kocialkowski (Chicago)	Democratic	March 4, 1933 – January 3, 1943	73rd 74th 75th 76th 77th	Elected in 1932. Re-elected in 1934. Re-elected in 1936. Re-elected in 1938. Re-elected in 1940. Lost renomination.	1913–1949; Cook
Thomas S. Gordon (Chicago)	Democratic	January 3, 1943 – January 3, 1959	78th 79th 80th 81st 82nd 83rd 84th 85th	Elected in 1942. Re-elected in 1944. Re-elected in 1946. Re-elected in 1948. Re-elected in 1950. Re-elected in 1952. Re-elected in 1954. Re-elected in 1956. Retired.	1913–1949; Cook
Thomas S. Gordon (Chicago)	Democratic	January 3, 1943 – January 3, 1959	78th 79th 80th 81st 82nd 83rd 84th 85th	Elected in 1942. Re-elected in 1944. Re-elected in 1946. Re-elected in 1948. Re-elected in 1950. Re-elected in 1952. Re-elected in 1954. Re-elected in 1956. Retired.	1949–1953; Cook
Thomas S. Gordon (Chicago)	Democratic	January 3, 1943 – January 3, 1959	78th 79th 80th 81st 82nd 83rd 84th 85th	Elected in 1942. Re-elected in 1944. Re-elected in 1946. Re-elected in 1948. Re-elected in 1950. Re-elected in 1952. Re-elected in 1954. Re-elected in 1956. Retired.	1953–1963; Cook
Dan Rostenkowski (Chicago)	Democratic	January 3, 1959 – January 3, 1993	86th 87th 88th 89th 90th 91st 92nd 93rd 94th 95th 96th 97th 98th 99th 100th 101st 102nd	Elected in 1958. Re-elected in 1960. Re-elected in 1962. Re-elected in 1964. Re-elected in 1966. Re-elected in 1968. Re-elected in 1970. Re-elected in 1972. Re-elected in 1974. Re-elected in 1976. Re-elected in 1978. Re-elected in 1980. Re-elected in 1982. Re-elected in 1984. Re-elected in 1986. Re-elected in 1988. Re-elected in 1990. Redistricted to the 5th district.	1953–1963; Cook
Dan Rostenkowski (Chicago)	Democratic	January 3, 1959 – January 3, 1993	86th 87th 88th 89th 90th 91st 92nd 93rd 94th 95th 96th 97th 98th 99th 100th 101st 102nd	Elected in 1958. Re-elected in 1960. Re-elected in 1962. Re-elected in 1964. Re-elected in 1966. Re-elected in 1968. Re-elected in 1970. Re-elected in 1972. Re-elected in 1974. Re-elected in 1976. Re-elected in 1978. Re-elected in 1980. Re-elected in 1982. Re-elected in 1984. Re-elected in 1986. Re-elected in 1988. Re-elected in 1990. Redistricted to the 5th district.	1963–1967; Cook
Dan Rostenkowski (Chicago)	Democratic	January 3, 1959 – January 3, 1993	86th 87th 88th 89th 90th 91st 92nd 93rd 94th 95th 96th 97th 98th 99th 100th 101st 102nd	Elected in 1958. Re-elected in 1960. Re-elected in 1962. Re-elected in 1964. Re-elected in 1966. Re-elected in 1968. Re-elected in 1970. Re-elected in 1972. Re-elected in 1974. Re-elected in 1976. Re-elected in 1978. Re-elected in 1980. Re-elected in 1982. Re-elected in 1984. Re-elected in 1986. Re-elected in 1988. Re-elected in 1990. Redistricted to the 5th district.	1967–1973; Cook
Dan Rostenkowski (Chicago)	Democratic	January 3, 1959 – January 3, 1993	86th 87th 88th 89th 90th 91st 92nd 93rd 94th 95th 96th 97th 98th 99th 100th 101st 102nd	Elected in 1958. Re-elected in 1960. Re-elected in 1962. Re-elected in 1964. Re-elected in 1966. Re-elected in 1968. Re-elected in 1970. Re-elected in 1972. Re-elected in 1974. Re-elected in 1976. Re-elected in 1978. Re-elected in 1980. Re-elected in 1982. Re-elected in 1984. Re-elected in 1986. Re-elected in 1988. Re-elected in 1990. Redistricted to the 5th district.	1973–1983; Cook
Dan Rostenkowski (Chicago)	Democratic	January 3, 1959 – January 3, 1993	86th 87th 88th 89th 90th 91st 92nd 93rd 94th 95th 96th 97th 98th 99th 100th 101st 102nd	Elected in 1958. Re-elected in 1960. Re-elected in 1962. Re-elected in 1964. Re-elected in 1966. Re-elected in 1968. Re-elected in 1970. Re-elected in 1972. Re-elected in 1974. Re-elected in 1976. Re-elected in 1978. Re-elected in 1980. Re-elected in 1982. Re-elected in 1984. Re-elected in 1986. Re-elected in 1988. Re-elected in 1990. Redistricted to the 5th district.	1983–1993; Cook
Phil Crane (Wauconda)	Republican	January 3, 1993 – January 3, 2005	103rd 104th 105th 106th 107th 108th	Redistricted from the 12th district and re-elected in 1992. Re-elected in 1994. Re-elected in 1996. Re-elected in 1998. Re-elected in 2000. Re-elected in 2002. Lost re-election.	1993–2003; Cook and Lake
Phil Crane (Wauconda)	Republican	January 3, 1993 – January 3, 2005	103rd 104th 105th 106th 107th 108th	Redistricted from the 12th district and re-elected in 1992. Re-elected in 1994. Re-elected in 1996. Re-elected in 1998. Re-elected in 2000. Re-elected in 2002. Lost re-election.	2003–2013 Cook, Lake, and McHenry
Melissa Bean (Barrington)	Democratic	January 3, 2005 – January 3, 2011	109th 110th 111th	Elected in 2004. Re-elected in 2006. Re-elected in 2008. Lost re-election.	2003–2013 Cook, Lake, and McHenry
Joe Walsh (McHenry)	Republican	January 3, 2011 – January 3, 2013	112th	Elected in 2010. Lost re-election.	2003–2013 Cook, Lake, and McHenry
Tammy Duckworth (Hoffman Estates)	Democratic	January 3, 2013 – January 3, 2017	113th 114th	Elected in 2012. Re-elected in 2014. Retired to run for U.S. Senate.	2013–2023 Cook, DuPage, and Kane
Raja Krishnamoorthi (Schaumburg)	Democratic	January 3, 2017 – present	115th 116th 117th 118th 119th	Elected in 2016. Re-elected in 2018. Re-elected in 2020. Re-elected in 2022. Re-elected in 2024. Retired to run for U.S Senate.	2013–2023 Cook, DuPage, and Kane
Raja Krishnamoorthi (Schaumburg)	Democratic	January 3, 2017 – present	115th 116th 117th 118th 119th	Elected in 2016. Re-elected in 2018. Re-elected in 2020. Re-elected in 2022. Re-elected in 2024. Retired to run for U.S Senate.	2023–present Cook, DuPage, and Kane
Melissa Bean (Palatine Township)	Democratic	Assuming office on January 3, 2027		Elected in 2026.	2023–present Cook, DuPage, and Kane

== Elections ==
=== 2012 election ===
Incumbent Representative Joe Walsh was drawn out of the district for 2012 by 2011 redistricting, although a candidate is not required to live in the district to be eligible to run for a seat in Congress. Democrat Raja Krishnamoorthi of Hoffman Estates announced his candidacy for the seat in late May 2011. In July 2011, Democrat Tammy Duckworth also announced plans to run for the seat. Duckworth won the Democratic nomination on March 20, 2012. Duckworth defeated Walsh in the general election on November 6, 2012.

Illinois's 8th congressional district, 2012
Party	Candidate	Votes	%
Democratic	Tammy Duckworth	123,206	54.7
Republican	Joe Walsh (incumbent)	101,860	45.3
Total votes		225,066	100.0
Democratic gain from Republican			

=== 2014 ===
Illinois's 8th congressional district, 2014
Party	Candidate	Votes	%
Democratic	Tammy Duckworth (incumbent)	84,178	55.7
Republican	Larry Kaifesh	66,878	44.3
Total votes		151,056	100.0
Democratic hold			

=== 2016 ===
Illinois's 8th congressional district, 2016
Party	Candidate	Votes	%
Democratic	Raja Krishnamoorthi	144,954	58.3
Republican	Pete DiCianni	103,617	41.7
Total votes		248,571	100.0
Democratic hold			

=== 2018 ===
Illinois's 8th congressional district, 2018
Party	Candidate	Votes	%
Democratic	Raja Krishnamoorthi (incumbent)	130,054	66.0
Republican	Jitendra "JD" Diganvker	67,073	34.0
Total votes		197,127	100.0
Democratic hold			

=== 2020 ===
Illinois's 8th congressional district, 2020
Party	Candidate	Votes	%	±%
Democratic	Raja Krishnamoorthi (incumbent)	186,251	73.16	+7.19%
Libertarian	Preston Gabriel Nelson	68,327	26.84	N/A
Total votes		254,578	100.0	
Democratic hold				

=== 2022 ===
Illinois's 8th congressional district, 2022
Party	Candidate	Votes	%
Democratic	Raja Krishnamoorthi (incumbent)	117,880	56.89
Republican	Chris Dargis	89,335	43.11
Total votes		207,215	100.0
Democratic hold			

=== 2024 ===
Illinois's 8th congressional district, 2024
Party	Candidate	Votes	%	±%
Democratic	Raja Krishnamoorthi (incumbent)	172,920	57.06	+0.17%
Republican	Mark Rice	130,153	42.94	−0.17%
Total votes		303,073	100.0	
Democratic hold				

== See also ==
- Illinois's congressional districts
- List of United States congressional districts
