= Peter C. Granata =

American politician

Member of the U.S. House of Representatives from Illinois's 8th district
- In office March 4, 1931 – April 5, 1932
- Preceded by: Stanley H. Kunz
- Succeeded by: Stanley H. Kunz

Member of the Illinois House of Representatives
- In office 1933-1973

Personal details
- Born: October 28, 1898 Chicago, Illinois, U.S.
- Died: September 29, 1973 (aged 74) Chicago, Illinois, U.S.
- Party: Republican

Peter Charles Granata (October 28, 1898 – September 29, 1973) was a U.S. representative from Illinois.

Born in Chicago, Illinois, Granata attended the public and high schools of his native city. He graduated from Bryant and Stratton Business College in Chicago in 1912. He engaged in the coal business beginning in 1917. Granata was chief clerk to the prosecutor of the city of Chicago in 1926-1928 and chief deputy coroner from 1928-1930.

Elected to the U.S. House of Representatives in 1930, Granata presented credentials as a Republican Member-elect to the Seventy-second Congress and served from March 3, 1931, to April 5, 1932, when he was succeeded by Stanley H. Kunz, who successfully contested the election. Granata had originally won the race by more than 1,000 votes, but Kunz successfully argued that, either by fraud or mistake, he was denied the votes of thousands of "straight ticket" ballots. Congress reviewed the ballots and found that Kunz been denied more than 2,300 votes; he was declared the winner. Granata ran again in 1932 and lost to Leo Kocialkowski, who had defeated Kunz in the Democratic primary.

Granata returned to the coal and oil business in Chicago until May 1933, when he enjoyed a political comeback and won a seat in the Illinois House of Representatives, where he would serve for 40 years, until his death. He would also serve as assistant director of finance of the State of Illinois from 1941-1943, and as vice president of a glass company in Chicago in 1948.

He was a resident of Chicago until his death there on September 29, 1973, and was interred in Mount Carmel Cemetery.

U.S. House of Representatives
Preceded by Stanley H. Kunz	Member of the U.S. House of Representatives from Illinois's 8th congressional district March 4, 1931 - April 5, 1932	Succeeded by Stanley H. Kunz
