= Dundee Township Historic District =

Historic district in Illinois, United States

- U.S. National Register of Historic Places
- U.S. Historic district
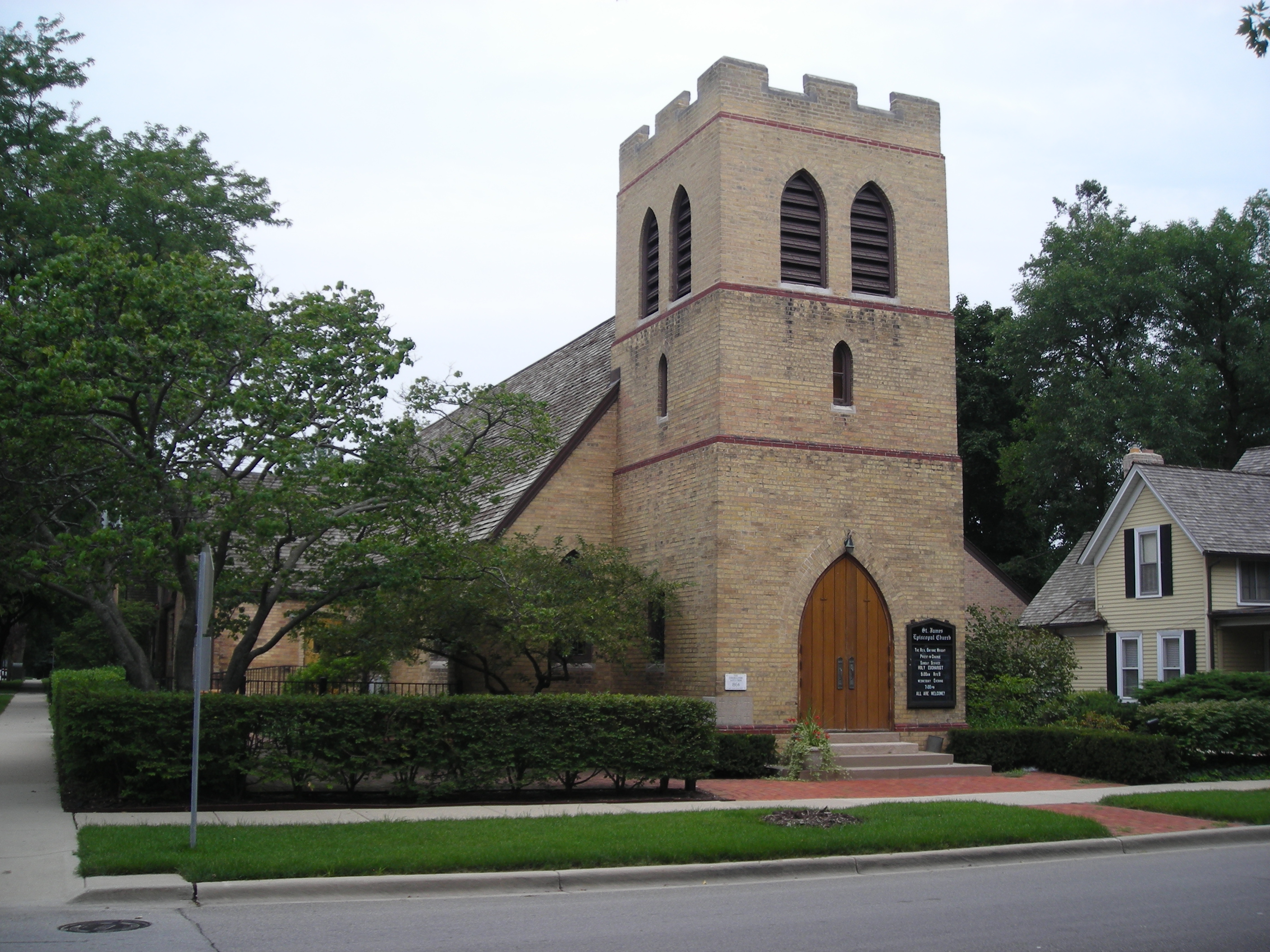
- St. James Episcopal Church in West Dundee

- Location within Illinois Location within the United States
- Location: Both sides of Fox River, including sections of E. Dundee, W. Dundee, and Carpentersville, Illinois
- Coordinates: 42°6′7″N 88°16′55″W
- Architectural style: Queen Anne, Italianate, Greek Revival
- NRHP reference No.: 75000666
- Added to NRHP: March 7, 1975

The Dundee Township Historic District is a set of sixty-five buildings in Dundee Township, Kane County Illinois. Buildings in the district are found in East Dundee, West Dundee, and Carpentersville. The district represents the development of the upper Fox River Valley from 1870 to the 1920s. Dundee Township became an important industrial area, especially following the construction of the Dundee Brick Company in West Dundee and the Illinois Iron and Bolt Company in Carpentersville. Also included in the district are a variety of Queen Anne, Italianate, and Greek Revival style houses and Gothic Revival churches. The majority of the historic district lies within the boundaries of West Dundee. It was added to the National Register of Historic Places in 1975.

== History ==
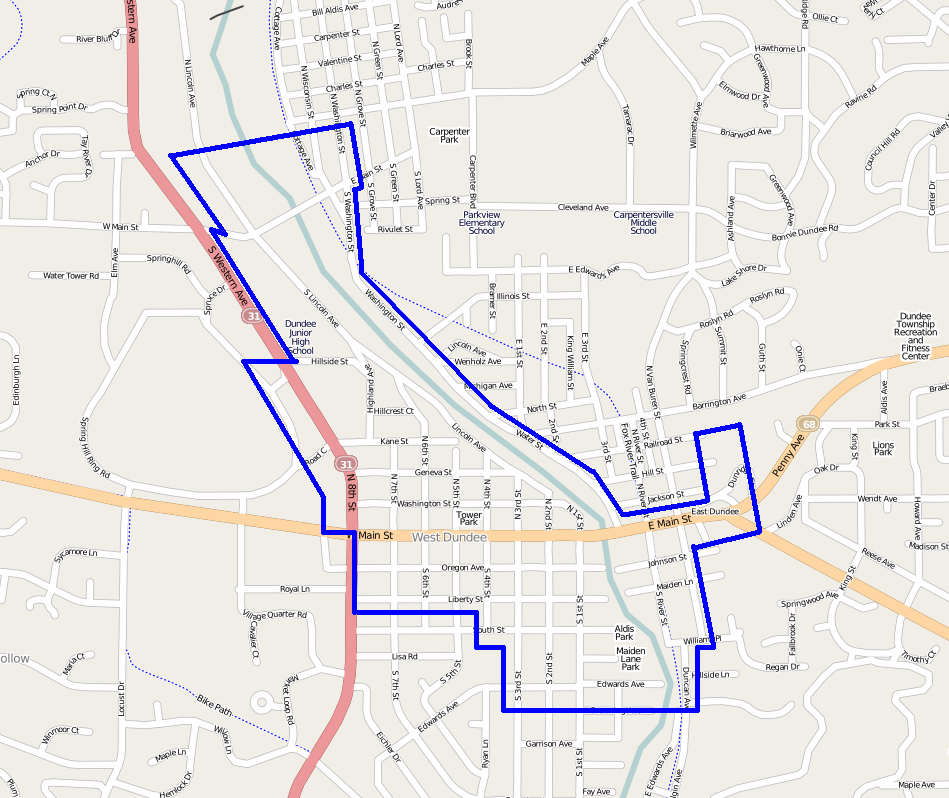
Location of the Dundee Township Historic District (dark blue) in the upper Fox River Valley.

West Dundee was first settled in 1834 by Jesse H. Newman. Shortly afterward, Newman's travel mate Joseph Russell erected his house on the east side of the Fox River, effectively becoming the first settler of East Dundee. Charles W. and Daniel G. Carpenter settled in what would become Carpentersville in 1837. Both East and West Dundee were platted in the early 1840s, and Carpentersville was platted in 1851. The Dundee Brick Company was an important early employer, starting in 1852. West Dundee was incorporated in 1867 and East Dundee followed four years later. The Illinois Iron and Bolt Company opened in Carpentersville in 1870. Dairy production became an important source of income for East and West Dundee in the 1870s. The period presently reflected in the historic district stretches from 1870 to the 1920s.

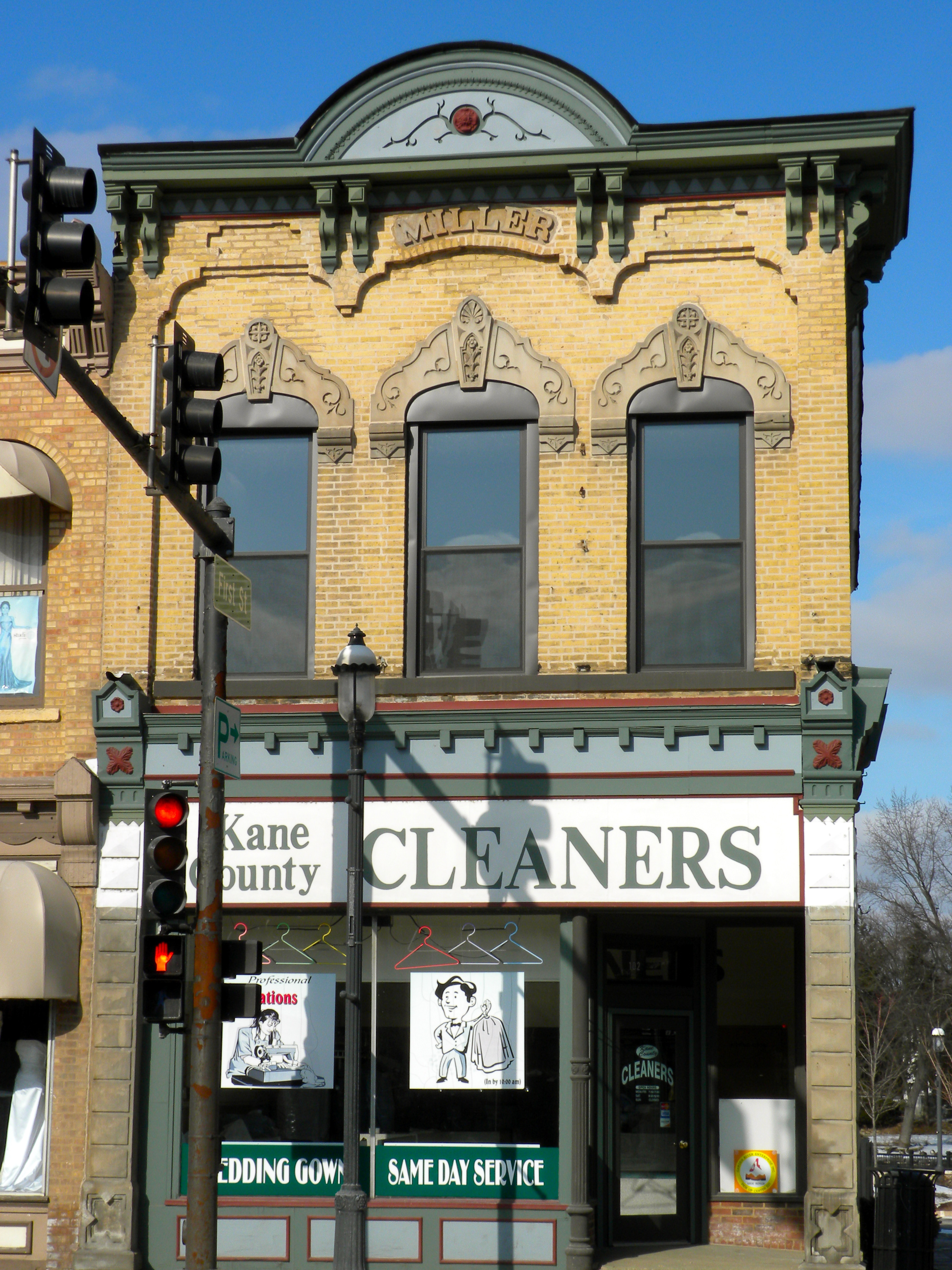
The Miller Block, one of the commercial buildings that was built along West Dundee's Main Street in the late 19th century.

Most of the properties in the district are within the bounds of West Dundee. The Dundee Cemetery first saw use in 1841, though it did not officially become a cemetery until 1862. A Baptist church was built in 1865 on the corner of Fourth and Main Streets, which later was sold to the Methodist congregation. Union School was originally built by Richter & Morris in 1873, but was destroyed in a fire five years later. It was reconstructed that year in the same design, and is now used by School District #300. Several important commercial properties were established along Main Street starting in the 1870s, including the First National Bank, Dundee State Bank, the Cleveland Drug Store, and the Dundee House Hotel. The First Congregational Church was also built on this strip in 1902, as did the Bethlehem Lutheran Church in 1912. St. James Episcopal Church was built in 1904 to serve the local Episcopalian congregation. In 1909, West Dundee constructed its Village Hall based on plans by George F. Morris of Elgin. St. Catherine's Catholic Church and School (1914, school added 1926) was an important church for Italian immigrants wishing to practice their faith while working for the Illinois Iron and Bolt Company.

In East Dundee, the Spring Mill was first built in 1837, though only one large black storage building remains. Most of the mill was demolished following financial troubles during The Great Depression. The Haeger Pottery Plant was built in 1871 for David H. Haeger. It initially provided bricks for Chicago following The Great Chicago Fire and later produced art pottery. Immanuel Lutheran Church was built in 1886 to serve German immigrants. It had the largest membership in Dundee Township.

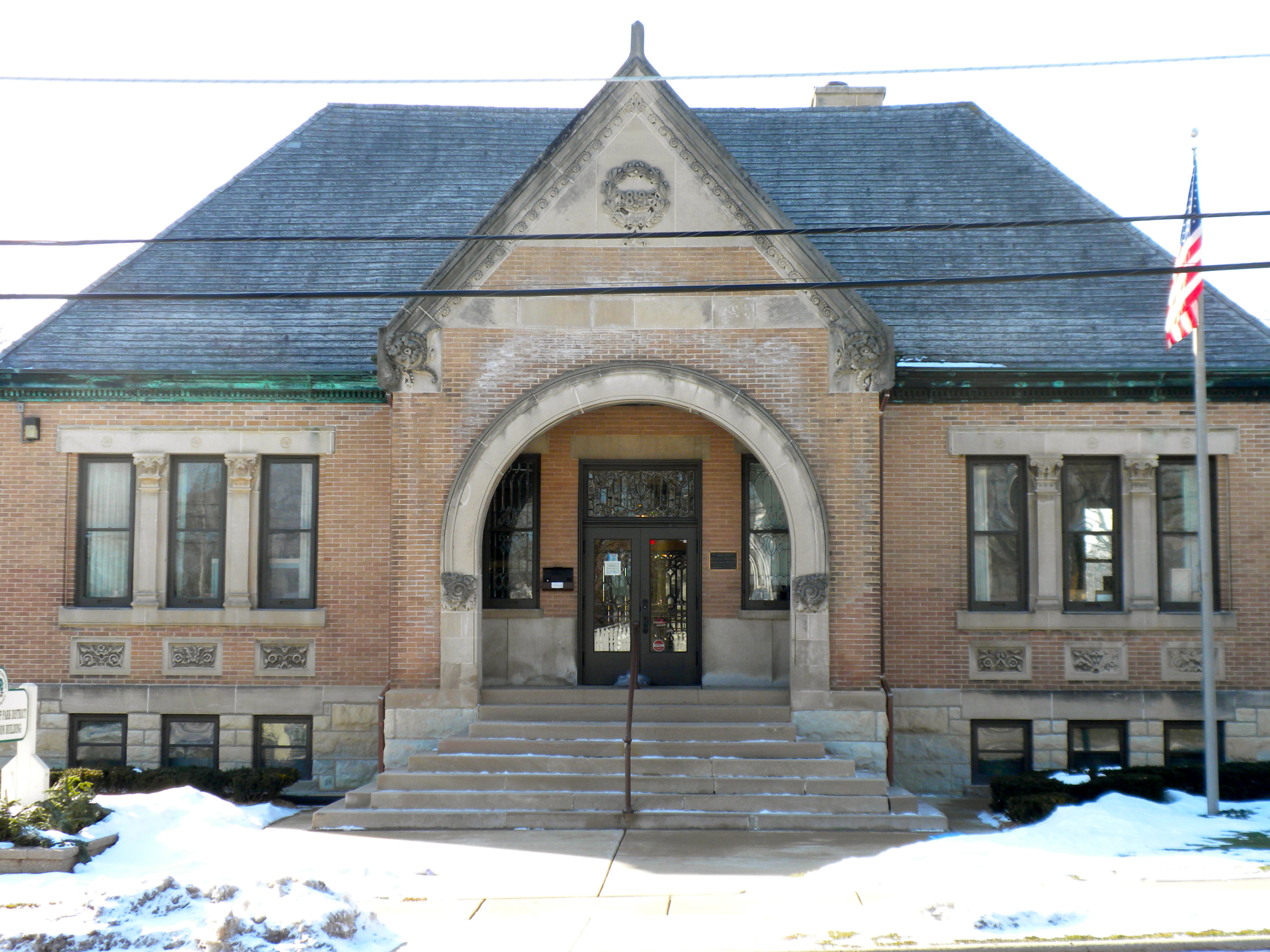
Library Hall, in Carpentersville, is individually listed on the National Register of Historic Places.

The Atlantic Flour Mills, built in 1846, are the oldest buildings in Carpentersville. The 1871 Illinois Iron and Bolt Company building was one of the major employers of the town. The Star Manufacturing Company was built in the early 1870s to make agricultural supplies and farm machinery. The Carpenter Store was built in 1877 and owned by the Carpenter family. Union Church Congregational and Parsonage was donated by Angelo and Mary Carpenter and was built in 1884. Library Hall was built in 1895 as a memorial to Angelo Carpenter, and is individually listed on the National Register of Historic Places.

The earliest homes in the district express some Greek Revival influence. As the population of the valley increased in the 1880s, Italianate homes became a major architectural style. The other important style of homes in the district is Queen Anne. There is one large Georgian Revival residence that was later converted into a bank. Most churches in the district are in the Gothic Revival style. The factories are Queen Anne and Renaissance Revival in design. Most buildings were built with locally fired brick from the Dundee Brick Company, which is notable for its unusual yellow color. The Dundee Township Historic District was added to the National Register of Historic Places on March 7, 1975.

== See also ==
- National Register of Historic Places listings in Kane County, Illinois
