= John M. Daley =

American lawyer and politician

Member of the Illinois House of Representatives from the at-large district
- In office 1965–1967
- Preceded by: District created
- Succeeded by: District abolished

Personal details
- Born: May 10, 1923
- Died: May 2, 2015 (aged 91)
- Party: Democratic

John M. Daley (May 10, 1923 – May 2, 2015) was an American lawyer and politician.

Daley was born in Chicago, Illinois and graduated from Leo Catholic High School in Chicago. During World War II, Daley served in the United States Navy in the Mediterranean theatre. He reached the rank of Lieutenant, junior grade at the end of the war. He went to Saint Mary's University of Minnesota in Winona, Minnesota and to DePaul University College of Law. Daley was admitted to the Illinois bar in 1949. He served as an Assistant State's Attorney in the Office of the Cook County State's Attorney and as a special deputy to the Director of the Illinois Department of Insurance during Adlai Stevenson's administration. He went into private practice prior to entering the legislature. Daley served in the Illinois House of Representatives from 1959 to 1963 and from 1965 to 1967. Daley was a Democrat.

In the 1964 statewide, at-large election for the Illinois House of Representatives, Daley was elected to the 74th General Assembly, as one of 118 Democrats and 59 Republicans selected by voters for the Illinois House of Representatives. He served as the Democratic committeeman for the 18th ward from 1967 until 1990, after which time he was replaced as Democratic committeeman by state legislator Andrew J. McGann. John M. Daley was a second cousin of Mayor Richard J. Daley of Chicago.
