= Thomas Gallagher (Illinois politician) =

American politician

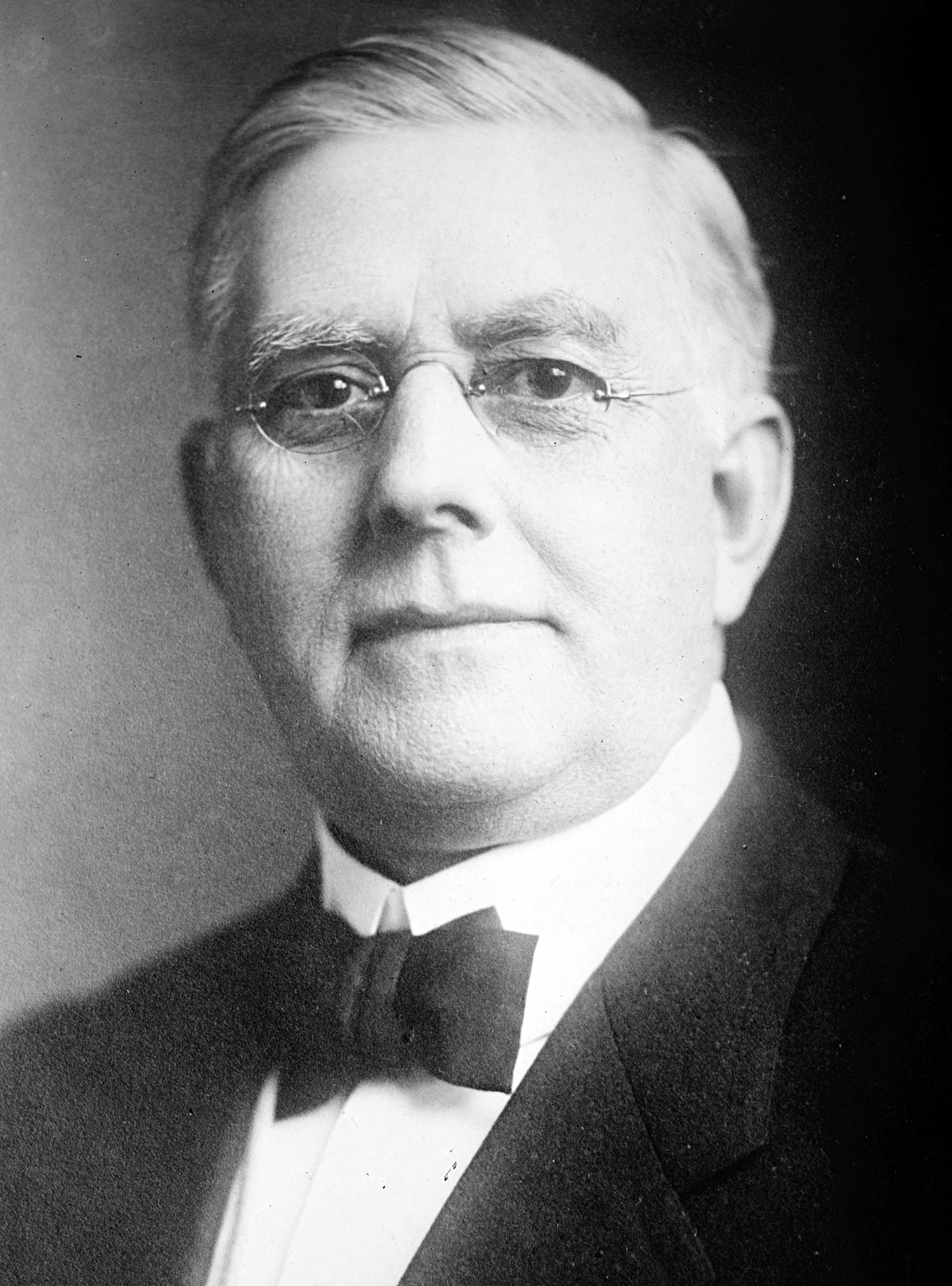

Member of the U.S. House of Representatives from Illinois's 8th district
- In office March 4, 1909 – March 3, 1921
- Preceded by: Charles McGavin
- Succeeded by: Stanley H. Kunz

Chairman of the Cook County Democratic Party
- In office 1902

Member of the Chicago Board of Education
- In office 1897–1903

Chicago Alderman from the 19th ward
- In office April 1893 – April 1897
- Preceded by: Michael J. O'Brien
- Succeeded by: Frank Lawler

Personal details
- Born: July 6, 1850 Concord, New Hampshire, U.S.
- Died: February 24, 1930 (aged 79) San Antonio, Texas
- Party: Democratic

Thomas Gallagher (July 6, 1850 – February 24, 1930) was a U.S. representative from Illinois.

== Biography ==
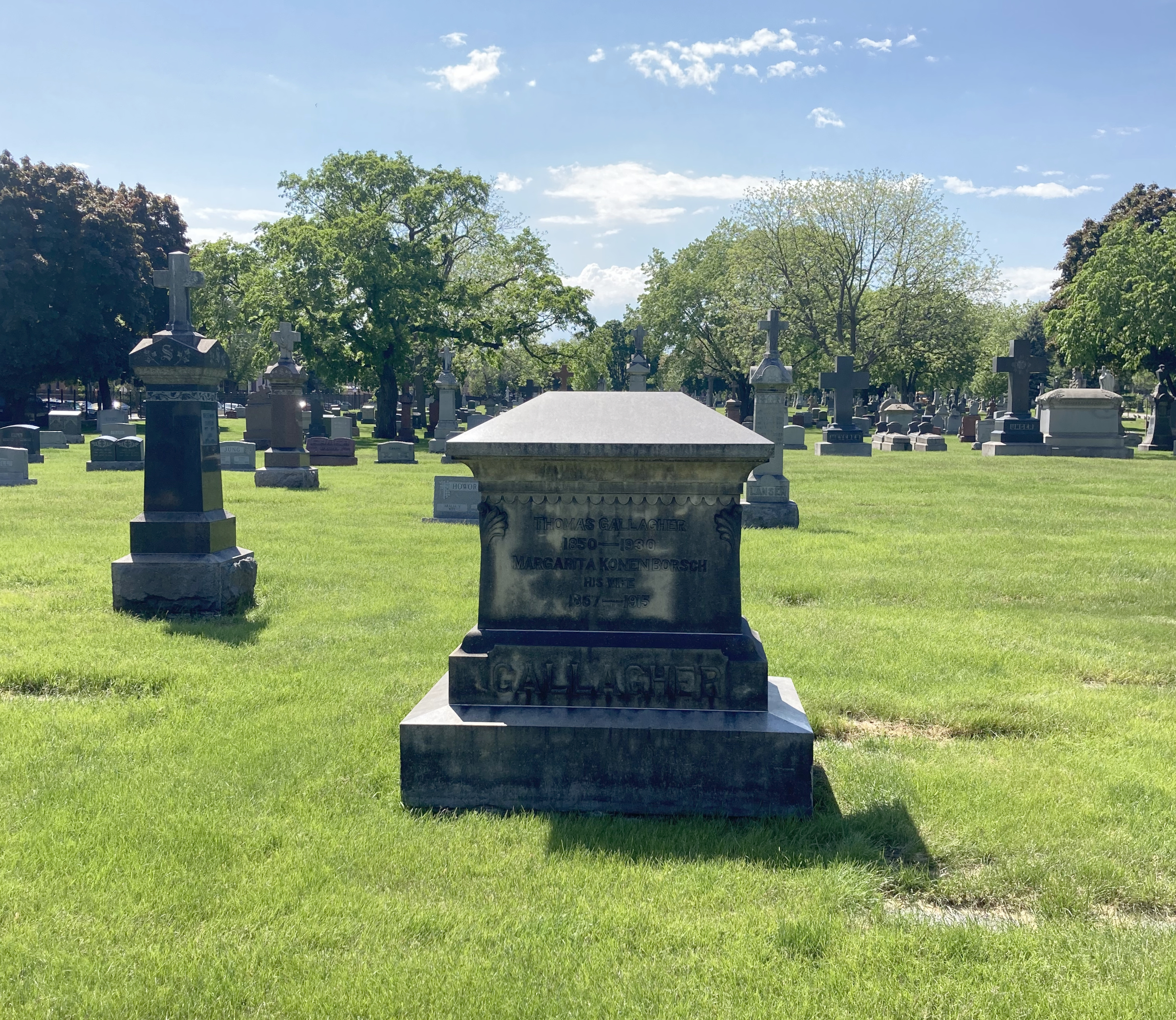
Gallagher' grave at St. Boniface Catholic Cemetery

Born in Concord, New Hampshire, Gallagher moved to Chicago in 1866. He attended the public schools. Learned the trade of iron molder. He entered the hat business in Chicago in 1878. He served as director of the Cook County State Savings Bank. He served as member of the city council of Chicago 1893-1897. He served as member of the board of education 1897-1903. He served as chairman of the Democratic central committee of Cook County in 1902. He served as president of the Democratic county committee in 1906 and 1907 and a member of the executive committee in 1909, 1911, and 1913.

Gallagher was elected as a Democrat to the Sixty-first and to the five succeeding Congresses (March 4, 1909 – March 3, 1921). He was an unsuccessful candidate for reelection in 1920 to the Sixty-seventh Congress. He retired from active pursuits and resided in Chicago, Illinois. He died February 24, 1930, in San Antonio, Texas, while on a visit. He was interred in St. Boniface Cemetery, Chicago.

U.S. House of Representatives
Preceded by Charles McGavin	Member of the U.S. House of Representatives from Illinois's 8th congressional district March 4, 1909 - March 3, 1921	Succeeded by Stanley H. Kunz
