= Reuben Ellwood =

American politician (1821–1885)

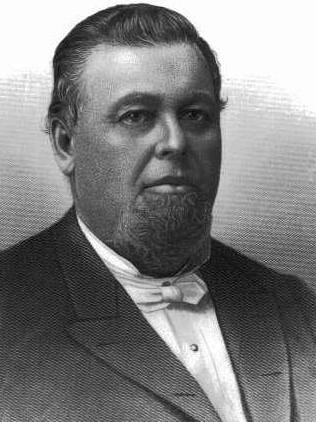

Member of the U.S. House of Representatives from Illinois's 5th district
- In office March 4, 1883 – July 1, 1885
- Preceded by: Robert R. Hitt
- Succeeded by: Albert J. Hopkins

Personal details
- Born: February 21, 1821 Minden, New York, U.S.
- Died: July 1, 1885 (aged 64) Sycamore, Illinois, U.S.
- Party: Republican

Reuben Ellwood (February 21, 1821 – July 1, 1885) was a U.S. representative from Illinois.

== Biography ==
Reuben Ellwood was born in Minden, New York on February 21, 1821, to Abraham and Sarah Ellwood. He attended public schools in New York before moving to DeKalb County, Illinois with his family when he was fifteen. There, he worked for a year as a farmhand to William Miller in Kingston. The next year, he traveled to Geneva to help construct a dam on the Fox River. After working in a Rockford brickyard, Ellwood had saved enough money to purchase a 160-acre (65 ha) farm near Sycamore, which he tended for four years.

He then returned to New York to attend Cherry Valley Seminary. Before graduating, he moved to Glenville, New York to operate a mill. Ellwood became interested in the cultivation of broom corn and ran a successful broom business, employing 130 men. He married Eleanor Vedder in 1849; they had six children. He was a member of the New York State Assembly (Schenectady Co.) in 1851 as a Whig. Ellwood was named a delegate to the 1856 Republican National Convention, the party that he would identify with for the rest of his life. He returned to Sycamore in 1857, engaging in the hardware trade, particularly farm machinery. He invested in local farm implement manufacturers and became one of the wealthiest men in the county. Ellwood continued his political aspirations as U.S. Assessor for the 4th Congressional District of Illinois the first mayor of Sycamore.

Ellwood was elected as a Republican to the 48th United States Congress. He was re-elected to the 49th United States Congress, but before its assembling, he died after a long illness in Sycamore on July 1, 1885. Ellwood was interred in Elmwood Cemetery. His brothers followed him to DeKalb County. Isaac became a prominent barbed wire entrepreneur and Chauncey also served as Sycamore mayor.

== See also ==
- List of members of the United States Congress who died in office (1790–1899)

New York State Assembly
Preceded by James Allen	New York State Assembly; Schenectady County; 1851	Succeeded by James Donnan
U.S. House of Representatives
Preceded by Robert R. Hitt	Member of the U.S. House of Representatives from Illinois's 5th congressional district 1883–1885	Succeeded by Albert J. Hopkins
