= Library Hall =

Historic place in Illinois, United States

- U.S. National Register of Historic Places
- U.S. Historic district – Contributing property
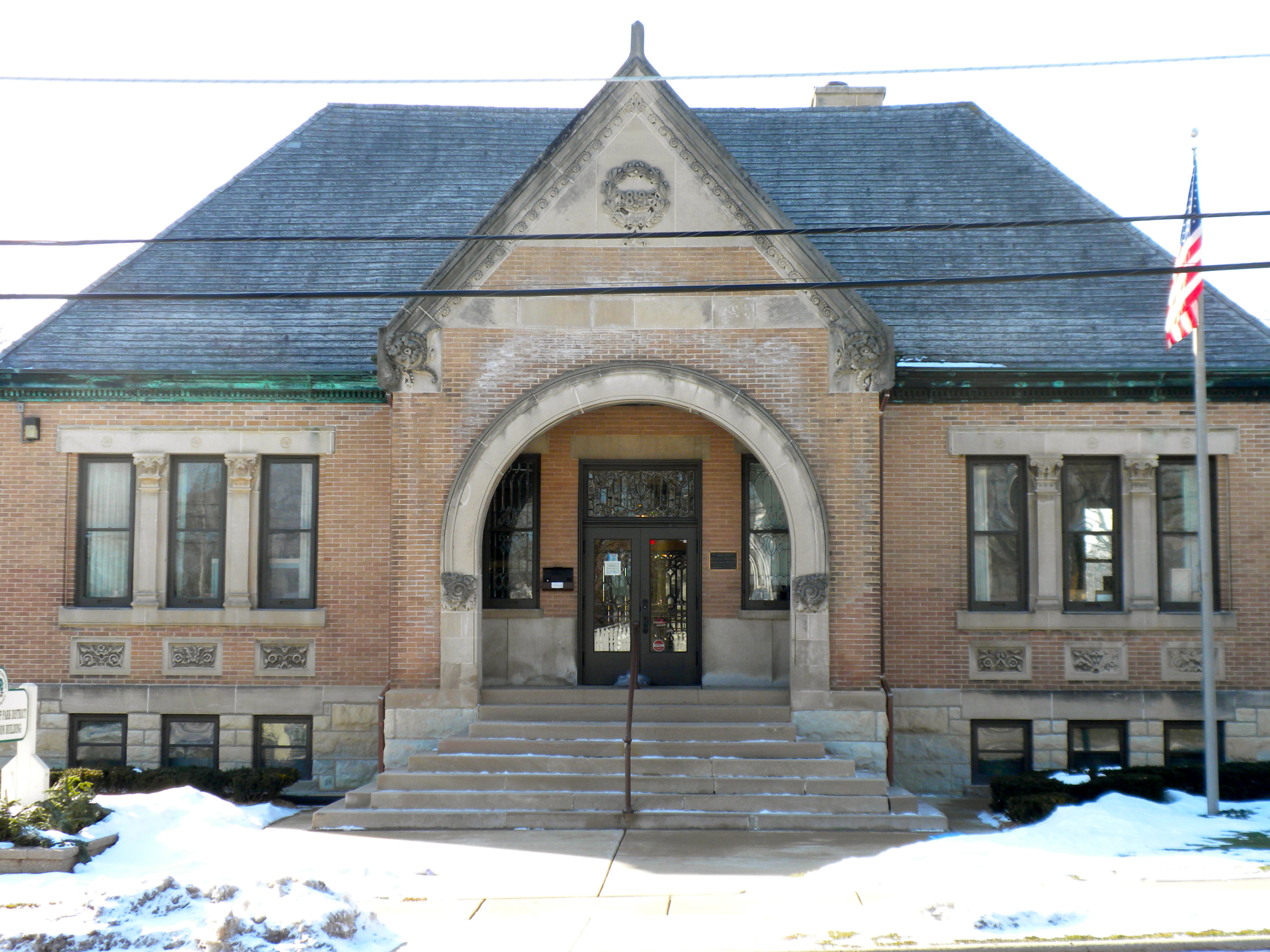

- Location within Illinois Location within the United States
- Location: 21 N. Washington St., Carpentersville, Illinois
- Coordinates: 42°6′37″N 88°17′16″W
- Area: 0.7 acres (0.28 ha)
- Built: 1897
- Architect: Turnbull & Jones
- Architectural style: Romanesque
- NRHP reference No.: 73000709
- Added to NRHP: August 14, 1973

Library Hall in Carpentersville, Illinois, also known as Administration Building, Dundee Township Park District, is a Romanesque architecture style building built during 1895–1897. It was built as a memorial to Julius Angelo Carpenter, donor of the Union Congregational Church and Parsonage in Carpenterville. It was individually listed on the National Register of Historic Places in 1973. Also it is included in Dundee Township Historic District.

== History ==
The Library Hall building was dedicated by Mary Carpenter Lord to her late husband and the residents of Carpentersville. Lord's husband, Angelo Carpenter, founded the settlement in 1851. Carpenter opened a store and built a bridge across the Fox River. Carpenter was instrumental in attracting a foundry for the Illinois Iron & Bolt Company, which provided many jobs for Carpentersville citizens. He was elected to the Illinois House of Representatives in 1870.

The design was inspired by a trip that Mary Carpenter Lord took abroad; Lord sought to design a building unlike anything else in the area. The building was dedicated on January 2, 1897. Ownership of the building fell into the hands of the local Congregational Church, who sold it to the Dundee Township Park District for use for the public. It was individually listed on the National Register of Historic Places in 1973, and listed as part of the Dundee Township Historic District two years later. Federal funds secured following the National Register listing allowed the park district to rehabilitate the building.

== Architecture ==
Library Hall is considered to be an example of Romanesque architecture, designed by Elgin firm Turnbull & Jones. The exterior walls were constructed with St. Louis pressed brick with Bedford Limestone trimmings. The gutters are made of copper, which has oxidized. The front of the building features beveled glass while the rear has stained glass art windows. Stone steps lead to the entrance. The floors are hard maple, wainscoted with Georgia pine. The first floor featured two reading rooms, a reference room, and a stock room. The fireplace on the floor includes a decorative tile hearth. Also on the floor was a ladies' parlor, which was used by parishioners when the building was owned by the church. A finished basement, also used by the church, included a lecture room, a steam heater (now replaced by an HVAC unit), a dining room, and a kitchen.
