= Ashburn Flying Field =

- IATA: none; ICAO: none

Summary
- Airport type: General aviation
- Owner/Operator: Aero Club of Illinois
- Serves: Chicago, Illinois
- Location: 41°44′44.00″N 87°44′44.64″W
- Opened: November 1916
- Closed: 1939
- Interactive map of Ashburn Flying Field

Ashburn Flying Field was the first airport built, after the 1911-established aerodrome named Cicero Flying Field closed in April 1916, to serve Chicago, Illinois. It opened in November 1916 in Ashburn, a community at the southwest corner of Chicago. The airfield site was a marshy area approximately a square mile in size, and previously devoid of trees or buildings, before the Aero Club of Illinois, itself founded on February 10. 1910, the organization that had operated the Cicero facility, moved its aerodrome's hangars and buildings to its new Ashburn Field facility some time before it had opened. It was offered for the use of the US government by the Aero Club of Illinois, The Ashburn facility's opening was shortly before the start of a pioneering airmail flight in 1916 by Victor Carlstrom, in a Curtiss biplane, from Chicago to New York City, sponsored by The New York Times. During World War 1, it was a Signal Corps training camp. After the war, it had airmail contracts. It was supplanted by nearby Midway Airport as a major aviation center for Chicago. It closed in 1939. The site is now Scottsdale Shopping center and subdivision.
