= Haeger Potteries =

American pottery manufacturer

Haeger Potteries was a pottery manufacturer established in 1852 and based in Kane County, Illinois.

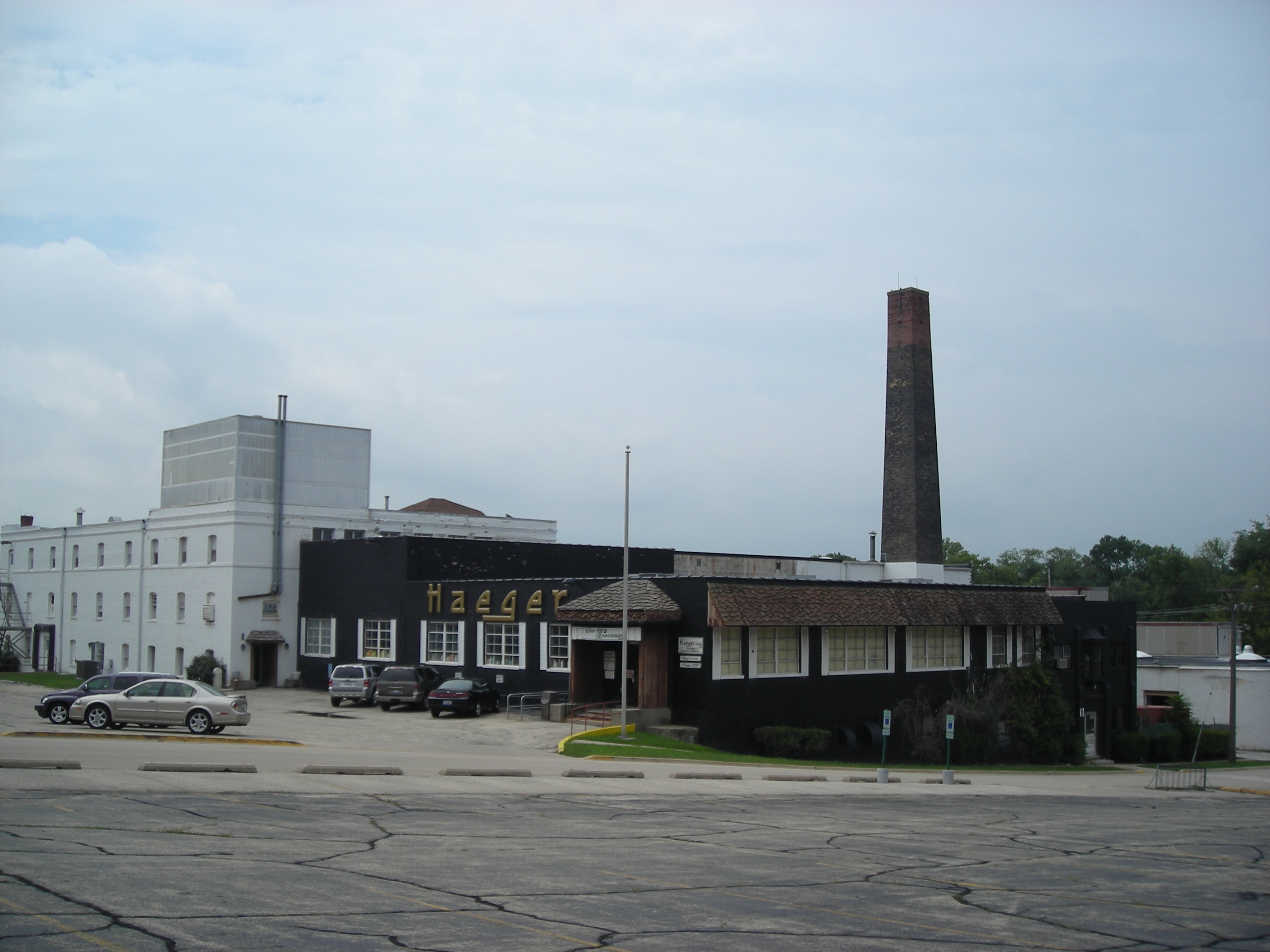
Haeger plant from S. Van Buren St. in East Dundee

== History ==
The company started as a Dundee, Illinois brickyard along the Fox River in 1852, using clay from the riverbank. David H. Haeger, a German immigrant, became part owner of the Dundee Brickyard in 1871. Within a year Haeger was sole owner and had extended the business to include tiles. After the Great Chicago Fire of 1871, Haegar shipped bricks into the city to help rebuild Chicago. By the 1920s the brickyard's production included teaware, luncheonware, crystal and glassware. At the Century of Progress Exposition in 1934 in Chicago, Haeger Potteries' exhibit included a working ceramic factory where souvenir pottery was made.

In 1934, Royal Arden Hickman (1893–1969) joined the firm to design a line of artware sold under the brand name "Royal Haeger". Hickman was the chief designer from 1938-1944. Items produced during Hickman's tenure are marked "Royal Haeger by Royal Hickman U.S.A. R-###". During the 1950s, Hickman, no longer employed by Haeger Potteries, contributed designs to the company as a freelancer. Hickman's "iconic black panther, a sleek elongated stalking cat first produced in 1941," has been a decorative "staple in Black households since the '80s and '90s" and was featured in the 2024 video for Kendrick Lamar's "Squabble Up."

Haeger pieces have become collectible in recent years. The original Haeger Potteries Plant is found in the Village of East Dundee within the Dundee Township Historic District. Haeger also had a plant in Macomb, Illinois, which has since been demolished.

Alexandra Haeger Estes, great granddaughter of founder David Haeger, became president of the company in 1979. She announced on April 6, 2016 Haeger Potteries anticipated ceasing operations in May 2016, after 145 years in business.
