= Thomas W. Murphy (Illinois judge) =

American judge

Thomas Murphy is a judge in the Cook County Circuit Court. Prior to winning election to that post in 2006, he served as an alderman of the 18th ward on the Chicago City Council, having first been elected to that office in 1991.

== Early life ==
Murphy was born and raised in Chicago, he went to Northern Illinois University and John Marshall Law School. He was a high school teacher and has practiced law since 1979. He has a daughter, Nora.

== Political career ==
Murphy was first elected as alderman in 1991 after a runoff election.

As alderman, Murphy led opposition to real estate property tax increases and voted against a salary increase for aldermen. He introduced an ordinance to cross-train firefighters and paramedics in order to improve public safety.

== Affiliations ==
Murphy founded the Summer Immunization Program, Youth Basketball League Sponsorship and Coaching. He has served as Vice-chairman of the Building and Budget committee; he also served on five other committees: Finance; Police and Fire; License and Consumer Protection; Rules and Ethics; and Aviation.

Elected to the Cook County Circuit Court in November 2006, Lona Lane was appointed to fill his remaining term in the Chicago City Council by Mayor Richard M. Daley.
