= William F. Mahoney =

American politician

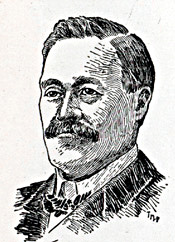
- engraving of William F. Mahoney

Member of the U.S. House of Representatives from Illinois
- In office March 4, 1901 – December 27, 1904
- Preceded by: Edward T. Noonan (5th); Albert J. Hopkins (8th)
- Succeeded by: James McAndrews (5th); Charles McGavin (8th)
- Constituency: 5th district (1901-03); 8th district (1903-04)

Member of the Chicago City Council
- In office 1890–1896
- Preceded by: Isaac Horner
- Succeeded by: John A. Rogers
- Constituency: 18th ward
- In office 1884–1887
- Preceded by: Michael Gaynor
- Succeeded by: Madison R. Harris
- Constituency: 9th ward

Personal details
- Born: February 22, 1856 Chicago, Illinois, U.S.
- Died: December 27, 1904 (aged 48) Chicago, Illinois, U.S.
- Party: Democratic

William Frank Mahoney (February 22, 1856 – December 27, 1904) was a U.S. representative from Illinois.

Born in Chicago, Illinois, Mahoney was educated in the public schools of the city. He engaged in mercantile pursuits in 1876.

Mahoney served as an alderman on the Chicago City Council, representing the 9th ward from 1884 to 1887 and the 18th ward from 1890 to 1896.

Mahoney was elected as a Democrat to the 57th and 58th Congresses and served from March 4, 1901, until his death in Chicago on December 27, 1904.

He was interred in Calvary Cemetery in Evanston, Illinois.

== See also ==
- List of members of the United States Congress who died in office (1900–1949)

U.S. House of Representatives
Preceded by Edward Thomas Noonan	Member of the U.S. House of Representatives from Illinois's 5th congressional district 1901–1903	Succeeded by James McAndrews
Preceded by Albert J. Hopkins	Member of the U.S. House of Representatives from Illinois's 8th congressional district 1903–1904	Succeeded by Charles McGavin
