= DeLoris Doederlein =

American educator and politician

Illinois House of Representatives
- In office 1987–1993

Personal details
- Born: October 6, 1925 (age 100)
- Party: Republican
- Education: Valparaiso University - National Louis University
- Awards: Civil Service Award

DeLoris Doederlein (born October 6, 1925) is an American retired politician and educator.

== Biography ==
Doederlein graduated from Valparaiso University and National Louis University. Prior to her political career, she was a schoolteacher across multiple grade levels in Community Unit District 300 and at Immanuel Lutheran School.

She raised her family in East Dundee, Illinois, where she lived with her husband, Fred, owning and operating a lumberyard.

In 1986, friends urged her to seek a position in state government. As a politician with the Republican Party, she served in the Illinois House of Representatives from 1987 until 1992.

After leaving office, Doederlein volunteered for various organizations in her local area, including the Veterans of Foreign Wars and Bethlehem Lutheran Church, where she was married.

In 2025 Kane County GOP awarded her their annual Civil Service Award.
