= Albert J. Hopkins =

American politician (1846–1922)

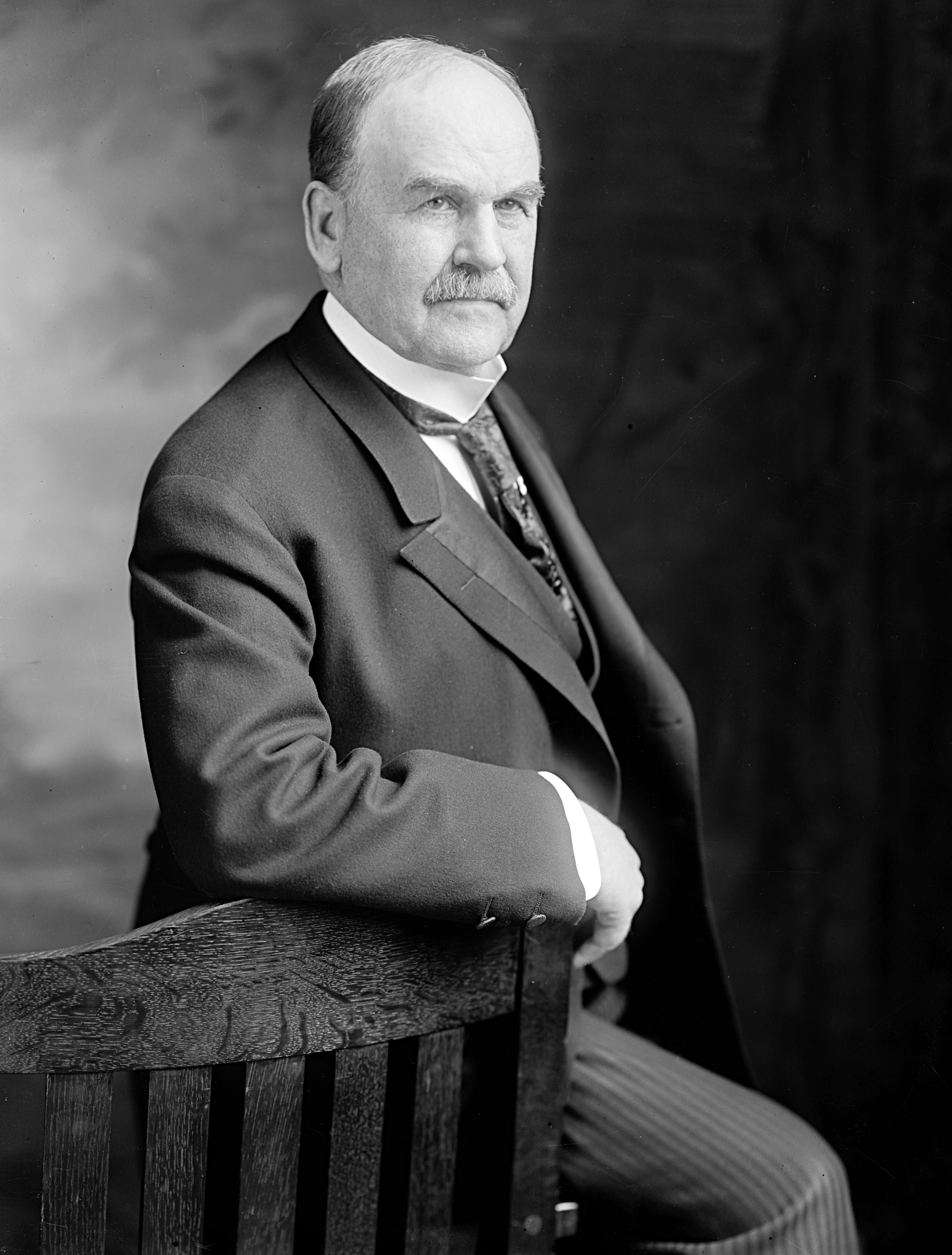
- Harris & Ewing portrait of Hopkins, taken between 1905 and 1922

United States Senator from Illinois
- In office March 4, 1903 – March 3, 1909
- Preceded by: William E. Mason
- Succeeded by: William Lorimer

Member of the U.S. House of Representatives from Illinois
- In office December 7, 1885 – March 3, 1903
- Preceded by: Reuben Ellwood
- Succeeded by: William F. Mahoney
- Constituency: 5th district (1885–1895); 8th district (1895–1903)

Personal details
- Born: Albert Jarvis Hopkins; August 15, 1846 Cortland, Illinois, US
- Died: August 23, 1922 (aged 76) Aurora, Illinois, US
- Party: Republican
- Occupation: Politician, lawyer
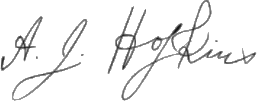
- Signature

Albert Jarvis Hopkins (August 15, 1846 – August 23, 1922) was an American politician and lawyer. A Republican, he was a member of the United States House of Representatives and the United States Senate from Illinois.

Born near Cortland, Illinois, Hopkins practiced law. He served in the House from 1885 to 1903, then in the Senate from 1903 to 1909, though had a mostly uneventful political career. Politically, he was conservative.

== Early life and education ==
Hopkins was born on August 15, 1846, near Cortland, Illinois, one of eight children born to Cyrus B. Hopkins and Fannie (née Larkin) Hopkins. Fannie was his father's second wife, his first wife being Mary J. Gandy, with whom he had three children. He was of Welsh descent.

Hopkins was raised on a farm, with his family later moving to Aurora. He began attending public school in Sycamore at age seventeen, graduating from Hillsdale College in 1870. He read law under J. C. Metzner, and in 1871, was admitted to the bar, after which he began practicing law in Aurora. From 1872 to 1876, he served as prosecutor of Kane County.

== Politics ==
Hopkins was a Republican. Following the death of Reuben Ellwood, he was elected to the United States House of Representatives, serving from December 7, 1885, to March 3, 1903. From 1885 to 1895, he represented Illinois's 5th district, and from 1895 to 1903, represented its 8th district. He refused to participate in the following election, instead running for the United States Senate. He was elected, serving as Senator from March 4, 1903, to March 3, 1909. While serving, he was chairman of the Committees on Fisheries and on Enrolled Bills.

Hopkins was an elector in the 1884 United States presidential election. He was a delegate to the Republican National Conventions of 1904 and 1908. Politically, he was conservative, though he held a liberal view on tariffs. On the Congressional floor, he was reserved and undemanding, with reformer George E. Cole calling him a "second-class man in a first-class office". This led to him losing his re-election. He once made a three-hour speech regarding the stipulations of construction of the Panama Canal, for which he was thanked by President Theodore Roosevelt and William Howard Taft.

== Personal life and death ==
After serving in Congress, Hopkins returned to practicing law, in Aurora and Chicago. In 1873, he married Emma C. Stolp, with whom he had four children. He died on August 23, 1922, aged 76, in Aurora, and was buried at Spring Lake Cemetery, in Aurora.

U.S. House of Representatives
| Preceded by Reuben Ellwood | Member of the U.S. House of Representatives from Illinois's 5th congressional district 1885–1895 | Succeeded by George E. White |
| Preceded by Robert A. Childs | Member of the U.S. House of Representatives from Illinois's 8th congressional district 1895–1903 | Succeeded by William F. Mahoney |
U.S. Senate
| Preceded by William E. Mason | U.S. senator (Class 3) from Illinois; 1903–1909; Served alongside: Shelby M. Cullom | Succeeded by William C. Lorimer |
