= Thomas S. Gordon =

American politician (1893–1959)

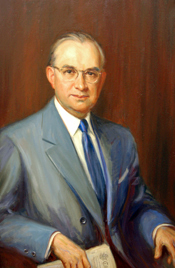

Member of the U.S. House of Representatives from Illinois's 8th district
- In office January 3, 1943 – January 3, 1959
- Preceded by: Leo Kocialkowski
- Succeeded by: Dan Rostenkowski

Personal details
- Born: December 17, 1893 Chicago, Illinois, U.S.
- Died: January 22, 1959 (aged 65) Chicago, Illinois, U.S.
- Party: Democratic

Thomas Sylvy Gordon (December 17, 1893 – January 22, 1959) was a U.S. representative from Illinois.

Born in Chicago, Illinois, Gordon attended the parochial schools and graduated from St. Stanislaus College in Chicago, in 1912. He was engaged in the banking business from 1916 to 1920 and worked at a Polish-language daily newspaper from 1921 to 1942, starting as a clerk and advancing to head cashier and office manager. He served as commissioner of Chicago West Parks from 1933 to 1936 and of public vehicle licenses from 1936 to 1939, and was a delegate to the Democratic National Convention in 1936. He was the Chicago city treasurer from 1939 to 1942.

Gordon was elected as a Democrat to the Seventy-eighth and to the seven succeeding Congresses (January 3, 1943 – January 3, 1959). He served as chairman of the Committee on Foreign Affairs (Eighty-fifth Congress). He was not a candidate for renomination in 1958. He died in Chicago, January 22, 1959 and was interred in St. Adalbert Cemetery (Niles), Chicago.

U.S. House of Representatives
Preceded by Leo Kocialkowski	Member of the U.S. House of Representatives from Illinois's 8th congressional district 1943-1959	Succeeded by Dan Rostenkowski
