= 18th ward, Chicago =

Ward in Chicago

18th Ward - Chicago
- Ward
- Ward 18
- Current Chicago ward map, with 18th ward highlighted in red
- Country: United States
- State: Illinois
- County: Cook
- City: Chicago
- Established: 1869
- Communities: list

Government
  - Type: Ward
  - Body: Chicago City Council
  - Alderperson: Derrick Curtis (Democratic Party)

The 18th Ward is one of the 50 aldermanic wards with representation in the City Council of Chicago, Illinois.

== History ==
From 1965 until 1990, the ward's committeeman was John M. Daley, a second cousin of the powerful Chicago mayor Richard J. Daley.

Since at least the 1980s, the majority of the Ashburn neighborhood has been located within the ward. As of the 2023–33 decennial reapportionment of ward boundaries, Ashburn is located entirely within the 18th ward.

== Past alders ==
The current alderperson for the 18th ward is Derrick Curtis.

=== Before 1923 ===
Before 1923, wards were represented by two aldermen.

Aldermen					# Council	Aldermen				
Alderman	Term in office	Party	Notes	Cite	# Council	Alderman	Term in office	Party	Notes	Cite
Thomas Carney	1869–1873				34th	Alexander Bengley	1869–1870			
Thomas Carney	1869–1873				35th	John McCaffrey	1870–1872		Later elected in 1878 in the 17th ward	
Thomas Carney	1869–1873				36th	John McCaffrey	1870–1872		Later elected in 1878 in the 17th ward	
Thomas Carney	1869–1873				37th	Thomas Cannon	1872–1874			
David Murphy	1873–1875		Was later elected in 1876 in the 17th ward		38th	Thomas Cannon	1872–1874			
David Murphy	1873–1875		Was later elected in 1876 in the 17th ward		39th	M. Sweeney	1874–1876		Redistricted to the 17th ward in 1876	
Jacob Boser	1876–1877				40th	James A. Kirk	1876–1878			
James H.B. Daly	1877–1879				41st	James A. Kirk	1876–1878			
James H.B. Daly	1877–1879				42nd	Julius Jonas	1878–1880		Previously served in 20th ward	
William Grigsby McCormick	1879–1881	Democratic			43rd	Julius Jonas	1878–1880		Previously served in 20th ward	
William Grigsby McCormick	1879–1881	Democratic			44th	August H. Burley	1880–1882	Republican		
Frank M. Blair	1881–1883	Republican			45th	August H. Burley	1880–1882	Republican		
Frank M. Blair	1881–1883	Republican			46th	John K. Geohegan	1882–1884	Democratic		
William R. Manierre	1883–1888	Democratic (1883–1886)	Redistricted to 24th ward in 1888		47th	John K. Geohegan	1882–1884	Democratic		
William R. Manierre	1883–1888	Democratic (1883–1886)	Redistricted to 24th ward in 1888		48th	John T. Noyes	1884–1886			
William R. Manierre	1883–1888	Democratic (1883–1886)	Redistricted to 24th ward in 1888		49th	John T. Noyes	1884–1886			
William R. Manierre	1883–1888	Republican (1886–1888)	Redistricted to 24th ward in 1888		50th	Jacob H. Tiedemann	1886–1888	Republican	Redistricted to 24th ward in 1888	
William R. Manierre	1883–1888	Republican (1886–1888)	Redistricted to 24th ward in 1888		51st	Jacob H. Tiedemann	1886–1888	Republican	Redistricted to 24th ward in 1888	
Madison R. Harris	1888–1891		Redistricted to from 9th ward		52nd	Isaac Horner	1888–1890			
Madison R. Harris	1888–1891		Redistricted to from 9th ward		53rd	Isaac Horner	1888–1890			
Madison R. Harris	1888–1891		Redistricted to from 9th ward		54th	William F. Mahoney	1890–1896	Democratic	Previously served in 9th ward	
John J. Brennan	1891–1913		Died in office. Due to redistricting hangover situation, during the 76th council both Stewart and Brennan simultaneously represented the ward for terms set to expire in 1913.		55th	William F. Mahoney	1890–1896	Democratic	Previously served in 9th ward	
John J. Brennan	1891–1913		Died in office. Due to redistricting hangover situation, during the 76th council both Stewart and Brennan simultaneously represented the ward for terms set to expire in 1913.		56th	William F. Mahoney	1890–1896	Democratic	Previously served in 9th ward	
John J. Brennan	1891–1913		Died in office. Due to redistricting hangover situation, during the 76th council both Stewart and Brennan simultaneously represented the ward for terms set to expire in 1913.		57th	William F. Mahoney	1890–1896	Democratic	Previously served in 9th ward	
John J. Brennan	1891–1913		Died in office. Due to redistricting hangover situation, during the 76th council both Stewart and Brennan simultaneously represented the ward for terms set to expire in 1913.		58th	William F. Mahoney	1890–1896	Democratic	Previously served in 9th ward	
John J. Brennan	1891–1913		Died in office. Due to redistricting hangover situation, during the 76th council both Stewart and Brennan simultaneously represented the ward for terms set to expire in 1913.		59th	William F. Mahoney	1890–1896	Democratic	Previously served in 9th ward	
John J. Brennan	1891–1913		Died in office. Due to redistricting hangover situation, during the 76th council both Stewart and Brennan simultaneously represented the ward for terms set to expire in 1913.		60th	John A. Rogers	1896–1898			
John J. Brennan	1891–1913		Died in office. Due to redistricting hangover situation, during the 76th council both Stewart and Brennan simultaneously represented the ward for terms set to expire in 1913.		61st	John A. Rogers	1896–1898			
John J. Brennan	1891–1913		Died in office. Due to redistricting hangover situation, during the 76th council both Stewart and Brennan simultaneously represented the ward for terms set to expire in 1913.		62nd	Michael Conlon	1898–1910	Democrat		
John J. Brennan	1891–1913		Died in office. Due to redistricting hangover situation, during the 76th council both Stewart and Brennan simultaneously represented the ward for terms set to expire in 1913.		63rd	Michael Conlon	1898–1910	Democrat		
John J. Brennan	1891–1913		Died in office. Due to redistricting hangover situation, during the 76th council both Stewart and Brennan simultaneously represented the ward for terms set to expire in 1913.		64th	Michael Conlon	1898–1910	Democrat		
John J. Brennan	1891–1913		Died in office. Due to redistricting hangover situation, during the 76th council both Stewart and Brennan simultaneously represented the ward for terms set to expire in 1913.		65th	Michael Conlon	1898–1910	Democrat		
John J. Brennan	1891–1913		Died in office. Due to redistricting hangover situation, during the 76th council both Stewart and Brennan simultaneously represented the ward for terms set to expire in 1913.		66th	Michael Conlon	1898–1910	Democrat		
John J. Brennan	1891–1913		Died in office. Due to redistricting hangover situation, during the 76th council both Stewart and Brennan simultaneously represented the ward for terms set to expire in 1913.		67th	Michael Conlon	1898–1910	Democrat		
John J. Brennan	1891–1913		Died in office. Due to redistricting hangover situation, during the 76th council both Stewart and Brennan simultaneously represented the ward for terms set to expire in 1913.		68th	Michael Conlon	1898–1910	Democrat		
John J. Brennan	1891–1913		Died in office. Due to redistricting hangover situation, during the 76th council both Stewart and Brennan simultaneously represented the ward for terms set to expire in 1913.		69th	Michael Conlon	1898–1910	Democrat		
John J. Brennan	1891–1913		Died in office. Due to redistricting hangover situation, during the 76th council both Stewart and Brennan simultaneously represented the ward for terms set to expire in 1913.		70th	Michael Conlon	1898–1910	Democrat		
John J. Brennan	1891–1913		Died in office. Due to redistricting hangover situation, during the 76th council both Stewart and Brennan simultaneously represented the ward for terms set to expire in 1913.		71st	Michael Conlon	1898–1910	Democrat		
John J. Brennan	1891–1913		Died in office. Due to redistricting hangover situation, during the 76th council both Stewart and Brennan simultaneously represented the ward for terms set to expire in 1913.		72nd	Michael Conlon	1898–1910	Democrat		
John J. Brennan	1891–1913		Died in office. Due to redistricting hangover situation, during the 76th council both Stewart and Brennan simultaneously represented the ward for terms set to expire in 1913.		73rd	Michael Conlon	1898–1910	Democrat		
John J. Brennan	1891–1913		Died in office. Due to redistricting hangover situation, during the 76th council both Stewart and Brennan simultaneously represented the ward for terms set to expire in 1913.		74th	William J. Healy	1910–1918			
John J. Brennan	1891–1913		Died in office. Due to redistricting hangover situation, during the 76th council both Stewart and Brennan simultaneously represented the ward for terms set to expire in 1913.		75th	William J. Healy	1910–1918			
John J. Brennan	1891–1913		Died in office. Due to redistricting hangover situation, during the 76th council both Stewart and Brennan simultaneously represented the ward for terms set to expire in 1913.		76th	William J. Healy	1910–1918			
John P. Stewart	1912–1913		redistricted from the 20th ward in 1912.		76th	William J. Healy	1910–1918			
					77th	William J. Healy	1910–1918			
					78th	William J. Healy	1910–1918			
Carl T. Murphy	1915–1917		previously represented the 20th ward		79th	William J. Healy	1910–1918			
Carl T. Murphy	1915–1917		previously represented the 20th ward		80th	William J. Healy	1910–1918			
John J. Touhy	1917–1923		redistricted to 27th ward in 1923		81st	William J. Healy	1910–1918			
John J. Touhy	1917–1923		redistricted to 27th ward in 1923		82nd	Maurice F. Kavanagh	1918–1922		Resigned after being elected to the Cook County Board of Commissioners	
John J. Touhy	1917–1923		redistricted to 27th ward in 1923		83rd	Maurice F. Kavanagh	1918–1922		Resigned after being elected to the Cook County Board of Commissioners	
John J. Touhy	1917–1923		redistricted to 27th ward in 1923		84th	Maurice F. Kavanagh	1918–1922		Resigned after being elected to the Cook County Board of Commissioners	
John J. Touhy	1917–1923		redistricted to 27th ward in 1923		85th	Maurice F. Kavanagh	1918–1922		Resigned after being elected to the Cook County Board of Commissioners	
John J. Touhy	1917–1923		redistricted to 27th ward in 1923		86th	Maurice F. Kavanagh	1918–1922		Resigned after being elected to the Cook County Board of Commissioners	

=== Since 1923 ===
Since 1923, wards have been represented by a single alderman. Elections have also been nonpartisan, though officeholders often still publicly affiliate with parties.

- Patrick F. Ryan (1923–1929)
- Walter W. Morris (1929–1933)
- Harry E. Perry (Democratic, 1933–1937)
- Bernard J. O'Hallaren
- Thomas J. Corcoran
- Frank J. McGrath
- James C. Murray
- Edward J. Hines
- Robert T. Kellam
- Thomas W. Murphy
- Lona Lane
- Derrick Curtis
