= George E. White (politician) =

American politician

George Elon White
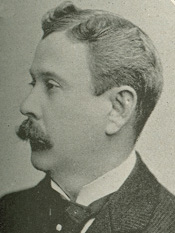

Member of the U.S. House of Representatives from Illinois's 5th district
- In office March 4, 1895 – March 3, 1899
- Preceded by: Albert J. Hopkins
- Succeeded by: Edward Thomas Noonan

Member of the Illinois Senate
- In office 1878-1886

Chicago Alderman from the 10th ward
- In office 1882-1884
- Preceded by: John Eiszner
- Succeeded by: H. Schroeder
- In office 1876-1878
- Preceded by: Charles L. Woodman
- Succeeded by: John Eiszner

Chicago Alderman from the 11th ward
- In office 1873-1876
- Preceded by: Henry Sweet
- Succeeded by: Amos G. Throop

Personal details
- Born: March 7, 1848 Millbury, Massachusetts, U.S.
- Died: May 17, 1935 (aged 87) Chicago, Illinois, U.S.
- Resting place: Rosehill Cemetery
- Party: Republican Party

George Elon White (March 7, 1848 – May 17, 1935) was a U.S. Representative from Illinois.

== Biography ==
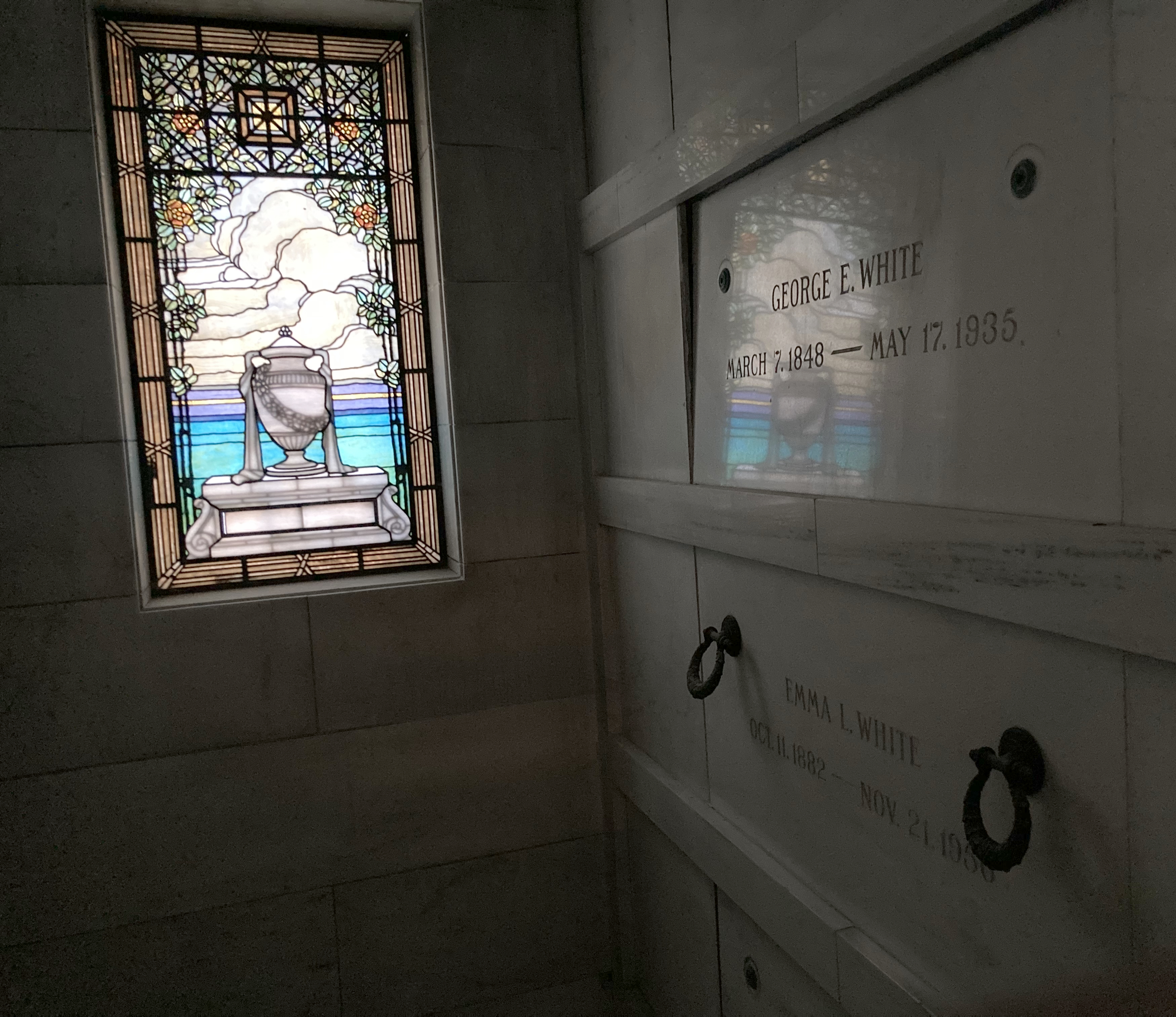
White's grave at Rosehill Mausoleum

Born in Millbury, Massachusetts, White attended the public schools. During the Civil War he enlisted as a private in the Fifty-seventh Regiment, Massachusetts Veteran Volunteers. After the end of the war, White entered a commercial college in Worcester, Massachusetts. He moved to Chicago, Illinois, in 1867, where he engaged in the lumber business and also became interested in banking. He also served as member of the board of aldermen of Chicago, and served as member of the Illinois State Senate from 1878 to 1886.

White was elected as a Republican to the Fifty-fourth and Fifty-fifth Congresses (March 4, 1895 – March 3, 1899). He was an unsuccessful candidate for reelection in 1898 to the Fifty-sixth Congress. He then resumed his former business pursuits in Chicago, Illinois, and served as president of the White Lumber Co. White died in Chicago, Illinois, on May 17, 1935; he was interred in the mausoleum in Rosehill Cemetery.

U.S. House of Representatives
Preceded by Albert J. Hopkins	Member of the U.S. House of Representatives from Illinois's 5th congressional district March 4, 1895 – March 3, 1899	Succeeded by Edward Thomas Noonan
