= Edward Thomas Noonan =

American politician

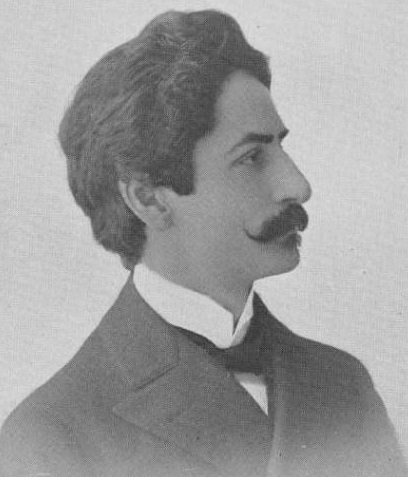
- From 1899's Illinois Political Directory

Member of the U.S. House of Representatives from Illinois's 5th district
- In office March 4, 1899 – March 3, 1901
- Preceded by: George E. White
- Succeeded by: William F. Mahoney

Personal details
- Born: October 23, 1861 Macomb, Illinois, U.S.
- Died: December 19, 1923 (aged 62) Chicago, Illinois, U.S.
- Party: Democratic
- Education: University of Michigan Law School
- Profession: Attorney

Edward Thomas Noonan (October 23, 1861 – December 19, 1923) was an attorney and politician from Chicago, Illinois. He served in the Illinois Senate and was a member of the United States House of Representatives.

== Biography ==
Noonan was born in Macomb, Illinois on October 23, 1861, and raised in Quincy and Chicago. He was educated in Quincy and Chicago, and studied law with Chicago attorney and judge Van H. Higgins. He attended law school at the University of Michigan while studying with Higgins, attained admission to the bar in 1882, and received his LL.B. degree in 1883.

In addition to practicing law, Noonan was active in Chicago politics as a Democrat. From 1890 to 1894, he was a member of the Illinois Senate, and from 1893 to 1897 he served on the military staff of Governor John Peter Altgeld with the rank of colonel. Noonan was counsel for the West Chicago Park Commission from 1893 to 1898, and as an unsuccessful candidate for Congress in 1894 and 1896.

Noonan was elected to the U.S. House in 1898, and served in the 56th United States Congress (March 4, 1899 – March 3, 1901). Noonan was not a candidate for reelection in 1900 and resumed the practice of law in Chicago.

== Death and burial ==
Noonan died in Chicago on December 19, 1923. He was buried at St. Paul's Catholic Cemetery in Macomb.

== Family ==
Noonan and his wife Lillian were the parents of two sons, Laurence (b. 1907) and Cato (b. 1916).

U.S. House of Representatives
Preceded by George E. White	Member of the U.S. House of Representatives from Illinois's 5th congressional district 1899–1901	Succeeded by William F. Mahoney
