= Derrick Curtis =

American politician

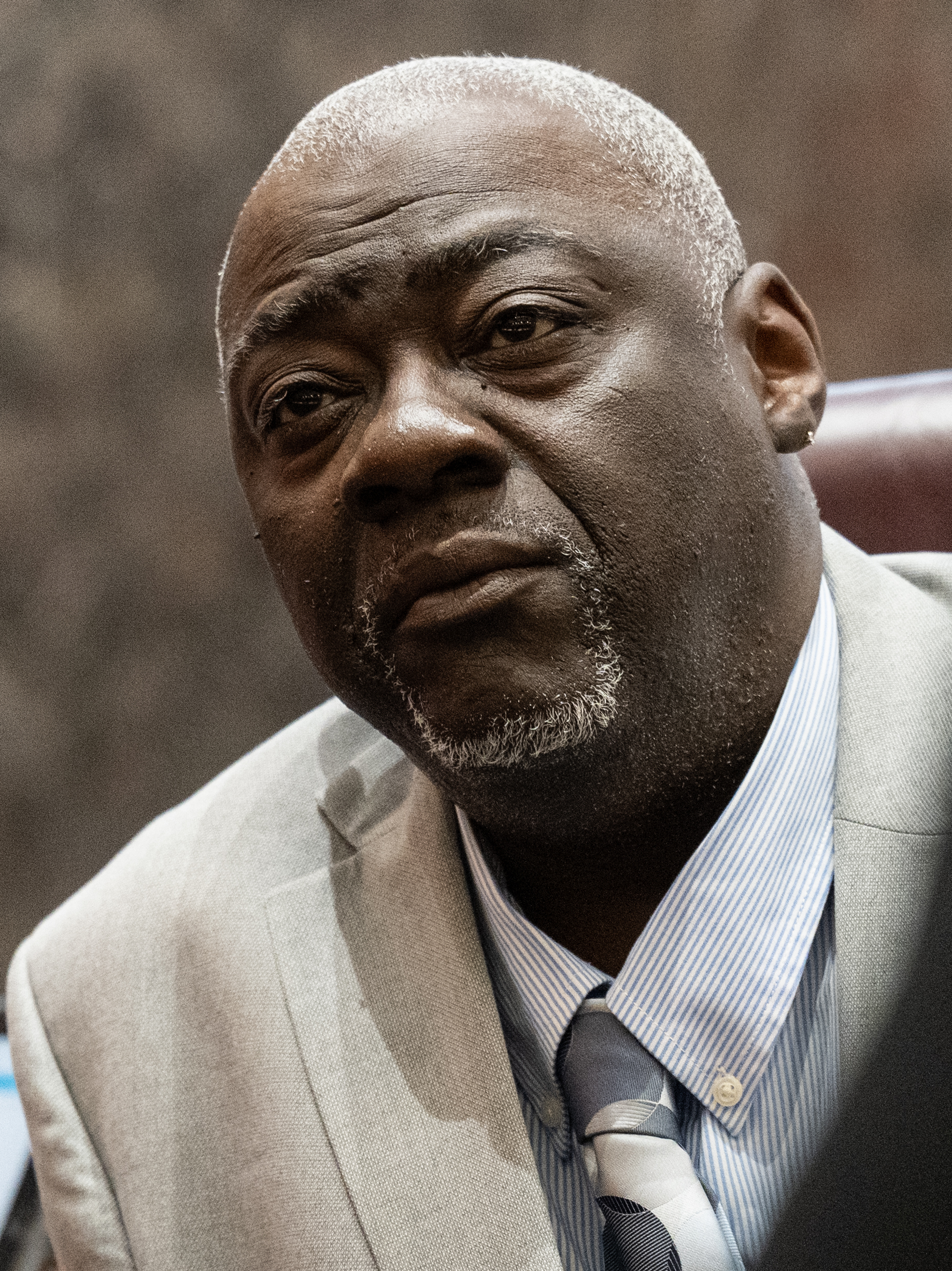

Member of the Chicago City Council from the 18th ward
- Incumbent
- Assumed office May 18, 2015
- Preceded by: Lona Lane

Personal details
- Born: 1968 or 1969 (age 57–58)
- Party: Democratic

Derrick G. Curtis (born 1968/69) is an American politician who has served as the alderman of Chicago's 18th ward since 2015. He became the Democratic committeeman of the ward in 2011 after Lona Lane stepped down from that position. Curtis had previously been the ward's Streets and Sanitation superintendent, with more than 25 years of experience as a precinct captain. He ran against Lane in the 2015 aldermanic race and defeated her in a runoff. He was sworn into office on May 18, 2015.

He won reelection in 2019, defeating Chuks Onyezia in the first round. During his term in office, Curtis was considered to be a City council ally of Mayor Lori Lightfoot. He had originally endorsed her for reelection in the 2023 Chicago mayoral election, but withdrew his endorsement after she did not reach out to Curtis after an incident in which Curtis accidentally shot himself while cleaning a gun. Around three months after that incident, Curtis's adult daughter was accidentally shot during a firearm training session he was leading.

== See also ==
- List of Chicago alderpersons since 1923
