= Stanley H. Kunz =

American politician

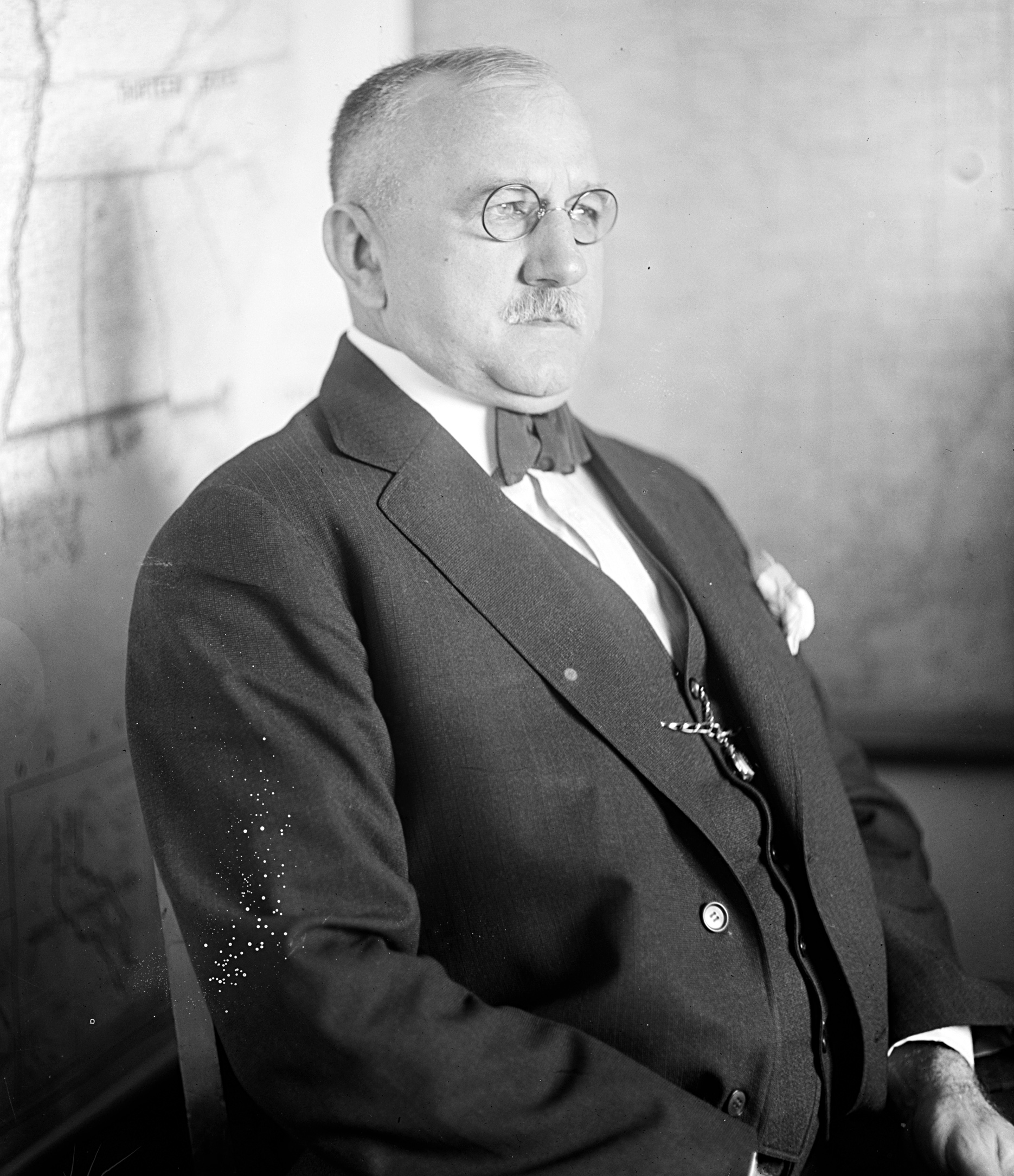

Member of the U.S. House of Representatives from Illinois's 8th district
- In office April 5, 1932 – March 3, 1933
- Preceded by: Peter C. Granata
- Succeeded by: Leo Kocialkowski
- In office March 4, 1921 – March 3, 1931
- Preceded by: Thomas Gallagher
- Succeeded by: Peter C. Granata

Member of the Illinois Senate
- In office 1902-1906

Member of the Illinois House of Representatives
- In office 1888-1890

Alderman on the Chicago City Council from the 16th ward
- In office 1917–1921
- Succeeded by: John Czekala
- In office 1907–1915
- Preceded by: John M. Nowicki
- In office 1898–1906
- Preceded by: Peter Kiołbassa
- In office 1891–1895 Serving with John C. Horn
- Preceded by: John C. Horn
- Succeeded by: George C. Lenke

Personal details
- Born: Stanley Henry Kunz; September 26, 1864 Nanticoke, Pennsylvania, U.S.
- Died: April 23, 1946 (aged 81) Chicago, Illinois, U.S.
- Resting place: St. Adalbert's Cemetery
- Party: Democratic

Stanley Henry Kunz (September 26, 1864 – April 23, 1946) was an American politician who served six terms as a Democratic U.S. representative from Illinois from 1921 to 1933.

== Early life and education ==
Kunz was born in Nanticoke, Pennsylvania in 1864. After his family moved to Chicago, he attended the public schools, St. Ignatius College (now known as Loyola University Chicago), and Metropolitan Business College.

== Politics ==
A Democrat, Kunz was elected to represent portions of Chicago as a legislator in local, state, and federal government.

=== Chicago City Council ===
Kunz served as an alderman on the Chicago City Council from the 16th ward. He was on and off the council for several non-consecutive stretches between 1891 and 1921: 1891-95, 1898–1906, 1907–15 and 1917–21.

=== Illinois General Assembly ===
Before and during his service on the Chicago City Council, Kunz served stints as an elected member of both chambers of the Illinois General Assembly. He served in the Illinois House of Representatives from 1888–90, and in the Illinois Senate from 1902-06.

=== Democratic intraparty politics ===
Kunz served as a member of the central committee of the Cook County Democratic Party from 1891 to 1925. He also was a delegate to the Democratic National Conventions of 1912, 1916, and 1924.

=== Congress ===
He was elected to the Sixty-seventh and to the four succeeding Congresses (March 4, 1921 – March 3, 1931). After an apparent defeat in 1930, he successfully contested the election of Republican Peter C. Granata to the Seventy-second Congress and served from April 5, 1932, to March 3, 1933. He was unsuccessful for renomination in 1932, losing to Leo Kocialkowski, who went on to win the general election.

== Other work ==
Kunz engaged in the breeding of thoroughbreds and racing horses in Palatine, Illinois from 1910 to 1933.

== Death ==
Kunz lived in Chicago until his death there in 1946. He was interred in St. Adalbert Cemetery in nearby Niles, Illinois.

U.S. House of Representatives
Preceded by Thomas Gallagher	Member of the U.S. House of Representatives from Illinois's 8th congressional district March 4, 1921 - March 3, 1931	Succeeded by Peter C. Granata
Preceded by Peter C. Granata	Member of the U.S. House of Representatives from Illinois's 8th congressional district April 5, 1932 - March 3, 1933	Succeeded by Leo Kocialkowski
