= Julius Angelo Carpenter =

American politician

Member of the Illinois House of Representatives from the 83rd & 14th district
- In office 1871 – 1875

Personal details
- Born: August 19, 1827 Uxbridge, Massachusetts
- Died: March 30, 1880 (aged 52) Elgin, Illinois
- Party: Republican
- Profession: Manufacturing and banking

Julius Angelo Carpenter (August 19, 1827 – March 30, 1880) was the founder of Carpentersville, Illinois, and its first prominent citizen. Carpenter came with his family from Massachusetts and settled near the Fox River. Carpenter built the settlement's first store, bridge, and factory. He served two consecutive terms in the Illinois House of Representatives.

== Biography ==
Julius Angelo Carpenter was born on August 19, 1827, in Uxbridge, Massachusetts, to Daniel G. Carpenter. Daniel and his brother Charles V. intended to settle in the Rock River Valley on their voyage east from Massachusetts. However, they were unable to cross the Fox River. Angelo, his father, and uncle then became the first settlers of what was originally known as Carpenters' Grove.

Angelo Carpenter became the first settler of what would become Carpentersville, Illinois. He opened the first store there when he was 23 and, at his own expense, built the first bridge in the vicinity across the Fox River in 1851. Carpenter platted the settlement and, in commemoration, locals renamed the town Carpentersville. Carpenter was appointed postmaster and Supervisor of the village. In 1852, he married Mary Edwards. They had three children: Ella Elizabeth, Alice May, and Julius Angelo, Jr., who died as an infant. In 1864, Carpenter founded the Illinois Iron & Bolt Company in a former reaper factory. The new factory produced springs, clothes irons, and other metal accessories.

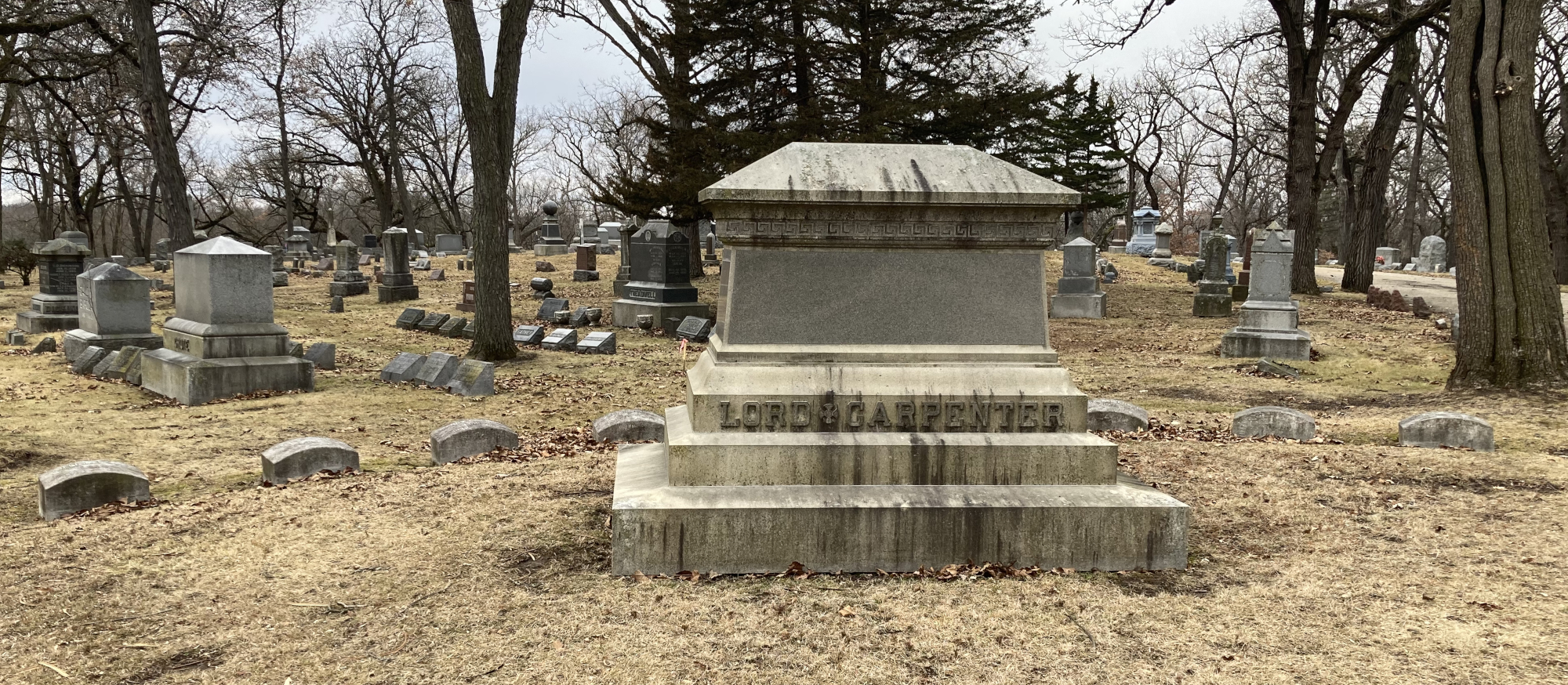
Carpenter's grave at Bluff City Cemetery

Carpenter successfully ran for a seat in the Illinois House of Representatives in 1871. Carpenter moved to Elgin at the end of his second and final term in 1875. After expanding the company's operations by purchasing the nearby Star Manufacturing Company in 1873, Carpenter was able to persuade the Chicago and North Western Railroad to build a station in Carpentersville. Carpenter used his own funds to build an iron bridge to accommodate the new track. By 1912, when the two factories consolidates, they employed 2,000 people. In Elgin, he served as treasurer for the Northern Illinois Hospital and Asylum for the Insane and President of the Elgin City Banking Co. Carpenter owned 1,200 acres (490 ha) of land in Kane County and 320 acres (130 ha) in Champaign County. He died after a short illness on March 30, 1880, and was buried in Bluff City Cemetery in Elgin. His widow Mary dedicated Library Hall in Carpentersville in his memory.
