= Leo Kocialkowski =

American politician

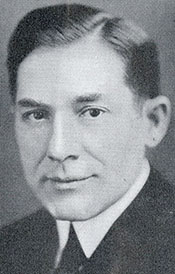

Member of the U.S. House of Representatives from Illinois's 8th district
- In office March 4, 1933 – January 3, 1943
- Preceded by: Stanley H. Kunz
- Succeeded by: Thomas S. Gordon

Personal details
- Born: Leo Paul Kocialkowski; August 16, 1882 Chicago, Illinois, U.S.
- Died: September 27, 1958 (aged 76) Chicago, Illinois, U.S.
- Resting place: St. Adalbert Cemetery
- Party: Democratic
- Parents: Michael Kocialkowski (father); Dorothy Wendzinski (mother)

Leo Paul Kocialkowski (August 16, 1882 – September 27, 1958) was an American politician who served five terms as a Democratic U.S. representative from Illinois from 1933 to 1943.

== Biography ==
Kocialkowski was born in Chicago, Illinois, the son of Michael and Dorothy (née Wendzinski) Kocialkowski, and was orphaned at an early age. He was educated in private schools, which he supplemented by a business course.

=== Early career ===
He worked in various capacities in several business houses in Chicago. He engaged in tax appraisal and delinquent tax supervision in Cook County, Illinois from 1916 to 1932.

He served as delegate to the Democratic National Convention in 1928.

=== Congress ===
Kocialkowski was elected as a Democrat to the Seventy-third and to the four succeeding Congresses (March 4, 1933 – January 3, 1943). He served as chairman of the Committee on Insular Affairs (Seventy-fourth through Seventy-seventh Congresses). He was an unsuccessful candidate for renomination in 1942.

=== Later career and death ===
He served as member of the Civil Service Commission of Cook County, Illinois from 1945 to 1949. He died in Chicago, Illinois, September 27, 1958. He was interred in St. Adalbert Cemetery.

U.S. House of Representatives
Preceded by Stanley H. Kunz	Member of the U.S. House of Representatives from Illinois's 8th congressional district 1933-1943	Succeeded by Thomas S. Gordon
