= Mount Auburn Cemetery (Harvard, Illinois) =

Cemetery in Harvard, Illinois, United States

- Interactive map of Mount Auburn Cemetery

Details
- Location: Harvard, Illinois
- Country: United States
- Coordinates: 42°24′49″N 88°35′36″W
- No. of graves: 5,000+
- Find a Grave: Mount Auburn Cemetery

Mount Auburn Cemetery is a cemetery located in Harvard, Illinois, in the United States.

== Notable interments ==
- Elbridge Ayer Burbank (1858–1949), American artist
