= East Dundee, Illinois =

Village in the United States

- Village
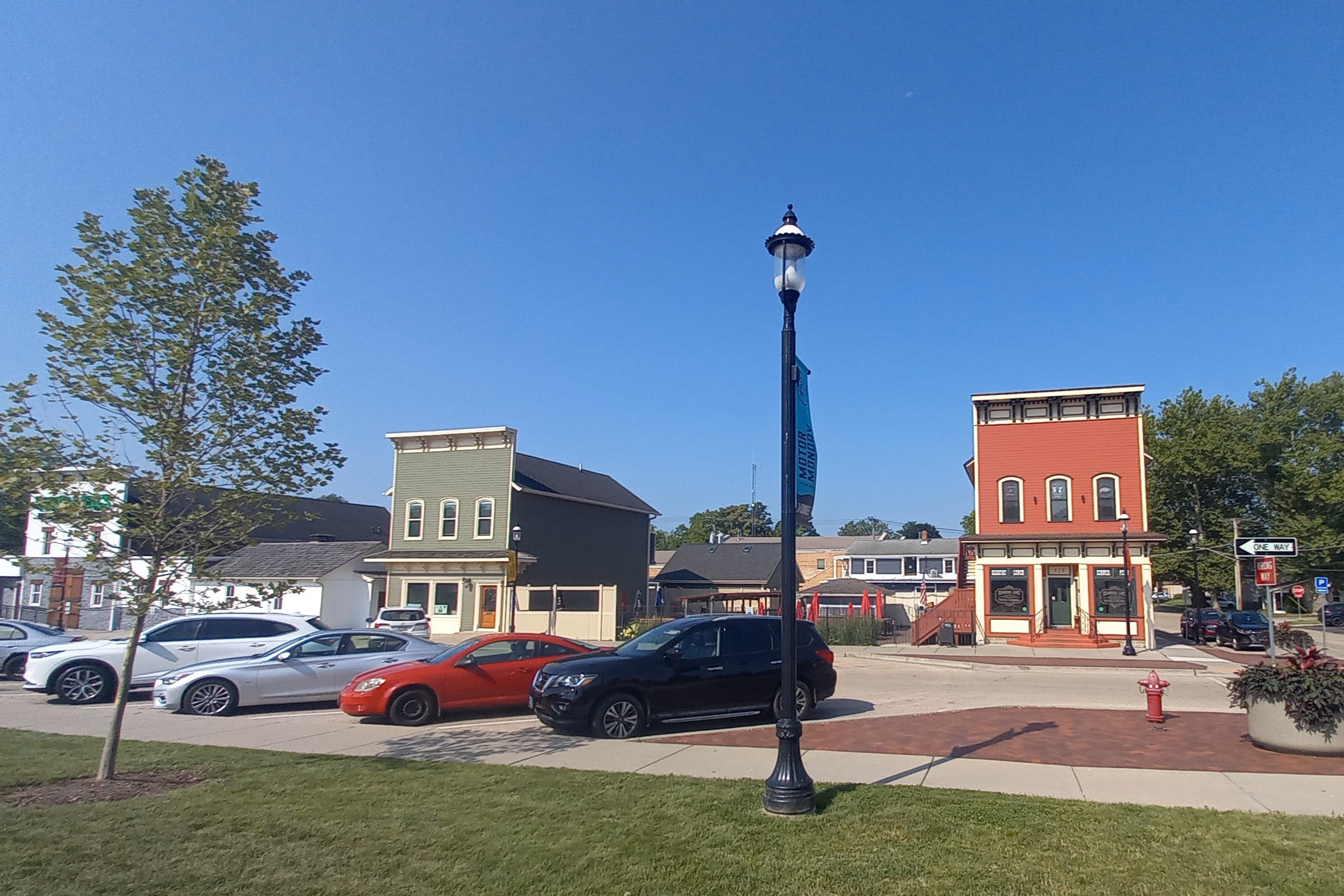
- Buildings between Railroad Street and Barrington Avenue

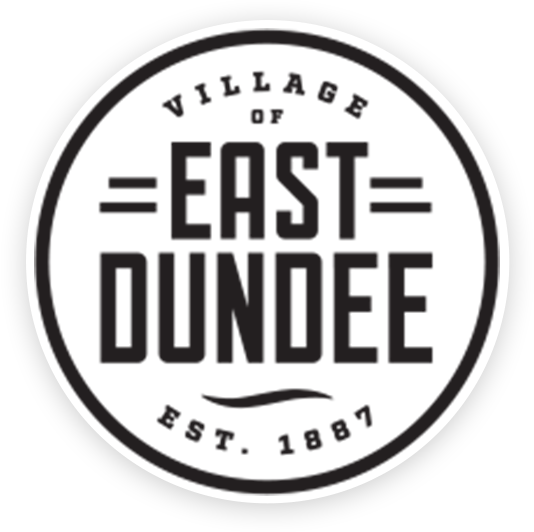
- Flag Seal

- Location of East Dundee in Kane County and Cook County, Illinois.

- Location within Chicago metropolitan area Location within Illinois Location within the United States
- Coordinates: 42°05′42″N 88°14′50″W
- Country: United States
- State: Illinois
- Counties: Kane, Cook
- Township: Dundee, Barrington
- Incorporated: 1871

Government
  - Type: President-trustee
  - President: Daniel Pearson

Area
  - Total: 3.15 sq mi (8.17 km^{2})
  - Land: 2.91 sq mi (7.54 km^{2})
  - Water: 0.24 sq mi (0.63 km^{2}) 8.08%
- Elevation: 830 ft (250 m)

Population (2020)
  - Total: 3,152
  - Density: 1,082.1/sq mi (417.81/km^{2})

Standard of living (2007-11)
  - Per capita income: $33,507
  - Median home value: $209,400
- ZIP code: 60118
- Area code(s): 847 & 224
- Geocode: 17-21696
- FIPS code: 17-21696
- GNIS feature ID: 2398774
- Website: eastdundee.net

East Dundee is a village in Kane County, Illinois, United States, with a small section in Cook County. The population was 3,152 at the 2020 census.

== History ==
The village of East Dundee was incorporated in 1871, four years after West Dundee. A historic district along the Fox River and stores on Main Street constitute the commercial part of East Dundee. The historic feed and coal store became Dundee Lumber, which burned down in March 2007. A former railroad bed is now the Fox River Trail, which follows the east side of the Fox River through town. The train depot was rebuilt in 1984 as a tourist center. Santa's Village theme park operated from 1959 to 2006. It reopened in 2011 under new ownership as Santa's Village AZoosment Park.

DeLoris Doederlein, educator and politician, lived in East Dundee.

== Geography ==
According to the 2021 census gazetteer files, East Dundee has a total area of 3.15 square miles (8.16 km^{2}), of which 2.91 square miles (7.54 km^{2}) (or 92.36%) is land and 0.24 square miles (0.62 km^{2}) (or 7.64%) is water.

== Demographics ==
Historical population
Census	Pop.	Note	%±
1880	849		—
1890	1,150		35.5%
1900	1,417		23.2%
1910	1,405		−0.8%
1920	1,303		−7.3%
1930	1,341		2.9%
1940	1,306		−2.6%
1950	1,466		12.3%
1960	2,221		51.5%
1970	2,920		31.5%
1980	2,618		−10.3%
1990	2,721		3.9%
2000	2,955		8.6%
2010	2,860		−3.2%
2020	3,152		10.2%
U.S. Decennial Census; 2010 2020

=== Racial and ethnic composition ===
East Dundee village, Illinois – Racial and ethnic composition Note: the US Census treats Hispanic/Latino as an ethnic category. This table excludes Latinos from the racial categories and assigns them to a separate category. Hispanics/Latinos may be of any race.
Race / Ethnicity (NH = Non-Hispanic)	Pop 2000	Pop 2010	Pop 2020	% 2000	% 2010	% 2020
White alone (NH)	2,725	2,471	2,241	92.22%	86.40%	71.10%
Black or African American alone (NH)	29	57	177	0.98%	1.99%	5.62%
Native American or Alaska Native alone (NH)	3	3	0	0.10%	0.10%	0.00%
Asian alone (NH)	51	76	74	1.73%	2.66%	2.35%
Pacific Islander alone (NH)	0	0	0	0.00%	0.00%	0.00%
Other race alone (NH)	1	0	4	0.03%	0.00%	0.13%
Mixed race or Multiracial (NH)	30	27	86	1.02%	0.94%	2.73%
Hispanic or Latino (any race)	116	226	570	3.93%	7.90%	18.08%
Total	2,955	2,860	3,152	100.00%	100.00%	100.00%

=== 2020 census ===
As of the 2020 census, East Dundee had a population of 3,152 and 850 families.

The median age was 46.5 years. 16.8% of residents were under the age of 18 and 22.9% were 65 years of age or older. For every 100 females, there were 94.1 males, and for every 100 females age 18 and over there were 91.5 males.

There were 1,447 households, of which 20.7% had children under the age of 18 living in them. Of all households, 42.9% were married-couple households, 19.6% were households with a male householder and no spouse or partner present, and 29.7% were households with a female householder and no spouse or partner present. About 33.0% of all households were made up of individuals, and 18.2% had someone living alone who was 65 years of age or older.

There were 1,502 housing units, of which 3.7% were vacant. The homeowner vacancy rate was 1.1% and the rental vacancy rate was 3.8%. The population density was 999.37 inhabitants per square mile (385.86/km^{2}), and housing units had an average density of 476.22 per square mile (183.87/km^{2}). 99.8% of residents lived in urban areas, while 0.2% lived in rural areas.

=== Income and poverty ===
The median income for a household in the village was $73,199, and the median income for a family was $91,591. Males had a median income of $64,575 versus $33,723 for females. The per capita income for the village was $52,929. About 7.5% of families and 10.4% of the population were below the poverty line, including 21.5% of those under age 18 and 8.6% of those age 65 or over.

== Transportation ==
Pace provides bus service on Routes 543 and 803 connecting East Dundee to Elgin and other destinations.

East Dundee was served by the Chicago & North Western line between Elgin and Crystal Lake. It was abandoned in the 1980s.

== Notable residents ==
- Nina Armagno (born 1966), first female general officer of the United States Space Force. She was a childhood resident of East Dundee.
- DeLoris Doederlein (born 1925), member of the Illinois House of Representatives from 1987 to 1993. She is a longtime East Dundee resident.

== See also ==
- Dundee Township Historic District
- Haeger Potteries
- Santa's Village AZoosment Park
