= Andrew J. McGann =

American politician, businessman, and funeral director

Andrew J McGann (August 3, 1925 – February 5, 2008) was an American politician, businessman, and funeral director who served as a Democratic member of the Illinois House of Representatives from 1983 to 1993.

== Biography ==
McGann was born in Chicago, Illinois and graduated from Leo Catholic High School. He served in the United States Navy during World War II and the Korean War. McGann graduated from Worshan College of Mortuary Science and was a funeral director in Chicago. He was also involved with the financial business. In the 1970s, Mayor Richard J. Daley appointed McGann to serve on the Board of Trustees for City Colleges of Chicago. He was elected to the Illinois House in 1982. After the Republican-drawn district map was implement during the 1991 decennial reapportionment, McGann moved to Oak Lawn to run in the new 36th district. In the 1992 general election, he lost to Republican candidate Maureen Murphy. He died at his home in Palm Desert, California after suffering a stroke. McGann also suffered from Parkinson-s disease and diabetics.
