= Suzanne Ness =

American politician

Suzanne M. Ness

Member of the Illinois House of Representatives from the 66th district
- Incumbent
- Assumed office January 13, 2021
- Preceded by: Gary Daugherty

Personal details
- Party: Democratic
- Children: 3
- Education: University of Phoenix (MA); Arizona State University (BS)

Suzanne M. Ness is a Democratic member of the Illinois House from the 66th district since January 13, 2021. The 66th district, located in the Chicago area, includes all or parts of Algonquin, Carpentersville, Crystal Lake, East Dundee, Elgin, Gilberts, Huntley, Lake in the Hills, Lakewood, Sleepy Hollow, and West Dundee.

Ness was elected to the 66th district after defeating Republican incumbent Allen Skillicorn. She was reelected to the Illinois House in 2022.

== Early life, education, and career ==
Ness graduated from Arizona State University with a Bachelor of Science in Communication Studies and a minor in Women's Studies. She graduated from the University of Phoenix with a Master of Arts in Organizational Management. She became a certified professional co-active coach from Coaches Training International in San Francisco. She works as a coach for Forward Effect and the owner of a small business. She has worked as an adjunct faculty member for Purdue University Global since 2010. In 2013, she founded the Living Forward Foundation. In 2018, she was elected as a member of the McHenry County Board.

As of July 3, 2022, Representative Ness is a member of the following Illinois House committees:

- Appropriations - General Service Committee (HAPG)
- Counties & Townships Committee (HCOT)
- Energy & Environment Committee (HENG)
- Human Services Committee (HHSV)
- Special Issues (HS) Subcommittee (HHSV-SPIS)
- State Government Administration Committee (HSGA)
- Transportation: Regulation, Roads & Bridges (HTRR)

== Electoral history ==
McHenry County, Illinois 2nd County Board District Democratic Primary, 2018
Party	Candidate	Votes	%
Democratic	Suzanne Ness	2,987	58.36
Democratic	Timothy O'Neill	2,131	41.61
Total votes		5,118	100.0

McHenry County, Illinois 2nd County Board District General Election, 2018
Party	Candidate	Votes	%
Republican	Carolyn Schofield	10,369	36.69
Democratic	Suzanne Ness	10,247	36.25
Republican	Josh Howell	7,648	27.06
Total votes		28,264	100.0

Illinois 66th State House District Democratic Primary, 2020
Party	Candidate	Votes	%
Democratic	Suzanne M. Ness	7,606	77.63
Democratic	Jim Malone	2,192	22.37
Total votes		9,798	100.0

Illinois 66th State House District General Election, 2020
Party	Candidate	Votes	%
Democratic	Suzanne M. Ness	29,966	51.97
Republican	Allen Skillicorn (incumbent)	27,698	48.03
Total votes		57,664	100.0

Illinois 66th State House District General Election, 2022
Party	Candidate	Votes	%	
Democratic	Suzanne Ness (incumbent)	19,645	53.17	+1.20%
Republican	Connie Cain	17,302	46.83	−1.20%
Total votes		36,947	100.0	

== Personal life ==
She has three children, a granddaughter, and "many nieces and nephews."
