= Gary Daugherty =

American politician

Member of the Illinois House of Representatives from the 66th district
- In office January 5, 2021 – January 13, 2021
- Preceded by: Allen Skillicorn
- Succeeded by: Suzanne Ness

Personal details
- Party: Republican
- Website: GaryDaugherty.com

Gary Daugherty was a Republican member of the Illinois House from the 66th district from January 5, 2021, to January 13, 2021. The 66th district, located in the Chicago area, includes all or parts of Algonquin, Carpentersville, Crystal Lake, East Dundee, Elgin, Gilberts, Huntley, Lake in the Hills, Lakewood, Sleepy Hollow, and West Dundee.

Daugherty was appointed as a representative in the 101st General Assembly after the resignation of defeated incumbent Allen Skillicorn on January 5, 2021. Daugherty was replaced in the 102nd General Assembly by Suzanne Ness, who won the general election in 2020 against former representative Skillicorn.
