= Allen Skillicorn =

American politician

Member of the Illinois House of Representatives from the 66th district
- In office January 11, 2017 – January 5, 2021
- Preceded by: Michael W. Tryon
- Succeeded by: Gary Daugherty

Vice Mayor of Fountain Hills, Arizona
- Incumbent
- Assumed office 2024

Member of the Fountain Hills Town Council
- Incumbent
- Assumed office December 2022

Personal details
- Born: July 8, 1974
- Party: Republican
- Spouse: Heather
- Parent: April (mother)
- Education: Associate degree
- Alma mater: Elgin Community College
- Website: Representative Biography

Allen Skillicorn is an American politician. He was a Republican member of the Illinois House of Representatives who represented the 66th district from 2017 to 2021. The 66th State House District includes parts of Algonquin, Crystal Lake, East and West Dundee, Elgin, Gilberts, Huntley, Lake in the Hills, Lakewood and Sleepy Hollow.

== Early life and education ==
Born in the 1970s, Skillicorn was raised in Algonquin, Illinois. He graduated from Dundee-Crown High School and received an associate degree from Elgin Community College.

== Career ==
Skillicorn worked as a Director of Marketing for a local electronics manufacturer.

Skillicorn served as a trustee for East Dundee, Illinois, and as vice-chairman of the Kane County Republican Party. He also served as Chairman of the Republican Liberty Caucus of Illinois, Liberty Leader for the Illinois Policy Institute, Illinois Rifle Association, former board member of the Northern Kane County Chamber of Commerce, Sports Car Club of America, and a volunteer for Therapy Dogs, Inc.

=== Illinois House of Representatives ===
After incumbent Republican Michael W. Tryon announced he would retire at the end of his term, four Republican candidates contested to replace him in the 2016 election, although one of those candidates withdrew and endorsed Skillicorn. Skillicorn won the primary with 37.1% of the vote. He won the general election on November 8, 2016, with 57.6% of the vote. Skillicorn was sworn in on January 11, 2017.

In 2018, Skillicorn won the Republican primaries for his district. No Democrats filed, so he ran unopposed.

Citing troubles with the Illinois Department of Employment Security website, Skillicorn launched a recall effort to remove Illinois Governor J. B. Pritzker from office. Skillicorn said fellow Republican House members Brad Halbrook, Blaine Wilhour, and Darren Bailey agreed to sign the petition. All three had expressed dissatisfaction with the Governor's stay-at-home order. When asked about the effort, Pritzker blamed Skillicorn, his party, and former Republican Governor Bruce Rauner for a two-year budget impasse that left the Illinois Department of Employment Security without necessary funding.

The Illinois Legislative Inspector General substantiated allegations in an ethics complaint filed against Skillicorn and found Skillicorn recorded as having voted on bills during a June 1, 2020, legislative session, despite not being present. Photos and videos showed Skillicorn at a parade about 220 miles (350 km) away from the Illinois Capitol. Skillicorn said he agreed with everything in the Inspector General's report and the votes he cast were inadvertent.

In the 2020 general election, Skillicorn lost his re-election bid to Democratic challenger Suzanne Ness. On January 5, 2021, eight days before the end of his term, Skillicorn resigned from the Illinois House of Representatives. Gary Daugherty, the Secretary of the Kane County Republican Party, was appointed to fill Skillicorn's vacancy during the lame duck session. Ness was sworn in for the 102nd General Assembly on January 13, 2021.

=== Other political activity ===
Skillicorn endorsed Libertarian Party candidate Kash Jackson in the 2018 Illinois gubernatorial election.

Skillicorn considered a 2020 bid for the 14th congressional district of Illinois. In a letter to Republican leadership regarding a pizza party, Skillicorn wrote, "I am serious about helping President Trump drain the swamp and empower the American people...If I am fortunate enough to serve as your congressman, I will be a tireless party builder to peel back the corrupt, corrosive influence of Nancy Pelosi and the new batch of Democratic socialists that threaten our jobs, communities, families and freedom while benefiting special interests." On September 4, 2019, Skillicorn instead endorsed Jim Oberweis for Congress in the 14th District and announced plans to seek re-election to the Illinois House.

=== Fountain Hills Town Council ===
After relocating to Fountain Hills, Arizona with his wife in December 2020, Skillicorn ran for a seat on the Fountain Hills Town Council in the August 2022 municipal election. One of four candidates competing for three open seats, he described himself as a "serial entrepreneur" with experience in advertising and marketing and campaigned on a platform centered on fiscal conservatism, prioritizing roads and infrastructure investment, increasing public safety funding, and preserving the town's small-town character and natural desert views. Skillicorn received 4,824 votes in the primary, finishing third among the four candidates and securing one of the three available council seats. He was sworn in as a council member in December 2022, joining fellow incoming members Brenda Kalivianakis and Hannah Toth along with continuing council members Gerry Friedel, Sharron Grzybowski, and Peggy McMahon.

== Personal life ==
Skillicorn resided with his wife, Heather, in East Dundee. Prior to 2020, he had lived in the Fox Valley area his entire life. In December 2020, Skillicorn and his wife moved to Fountain Hills, Arizona, where he was subsequently elected to the town council and later served as Vice Mayor.
