= Carpentersville Middle School =

Middle school in Chicago suburbs

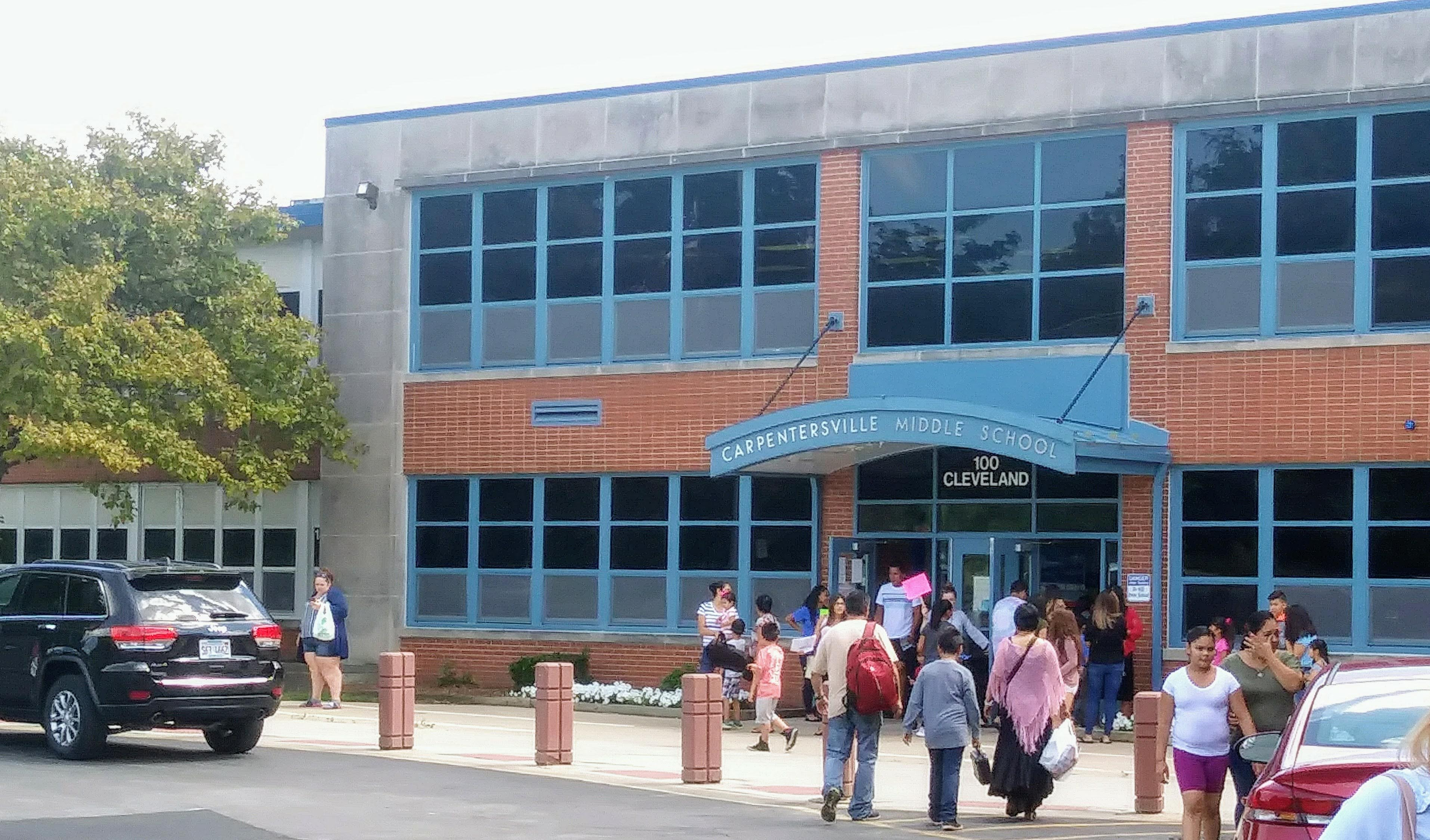
- Front view of Carpentersville Middle School

Location
- 100 Cleveland Ave; Carpentersville, Illinois; United States
- Coordinates: 42.108°N 88.274°W

Information
- Type: Regular
- Established: 1954
- Status: Open
- School district: CUSD 300
- Principal: Martina D. Smith
- Grades: 6–8
- Enrollment: 1224
- Hours in school day: 6.75
- Colors: Red and royal blue
- Website: www.d300.org/cms

Carpentersville Middle School is a middle school in Carpentersville, Illinois, United States, a suburb of Chicago, in northern Kane County. It is one of four Middle Schools in Community Unit School District 300. It was constructed in 1954 and is connected on one side to Oak Ridge Alternative School.

== Statistics ==
=== Racial makeup ===
There are 1224 students currently enrolled. As of 2016, the student population consisted mainly of Hispanics at 83.1% of the student body. African Americans made up 9.5%, Caucasian 6.7%, Interracial 1.4%, Asian <0.01%, and American Indian <0.01%.

=== Income ===
93% of students come from low income families. In the 2009–2010 school year, 82% of students are eligible for the Free Lunch Program. About 0.93% attending the school are homeless.

=== Standardized Assessments ===
Carpentersville Middle School took the Illinois Standards Achievement Test prior to the 2013–14 school year, but changed to the PARCC test in 2015. In 2016, 19% of students passed the Mathematics section of the PARCC test, compared to the Illinois average of 29%, while only 0.4% exceeded. In English/Language Arts, 22% of students passed, compared to the Illinois average of 37%. According to Greatschools.org, test scores at the school were below the state average.

=== Disciplinary trends ===
27.9% of students currently attending Carpentersville Middle School have received at least one in-school suspension, a chronic amount compared to the Illinois Middle School average of 3.8%. Also, 26.2% of students have had at least on Out-of-School Suspension, compared to the Illinois Middle School average of 3.6%.

== 6th Grade ==
Prior to the 2016–17 school year, Carpentersville Middle School enrolled only the 7th and 8th grades. In the 2016–17 school year, 6th graders who previously attended Lakewood School would attend Carpentersville Middle School. To accommodate, an 11 classroom expansion was and finished at the end of July 2015. The project had a budget of $2.6 million.

== Extra-curricular programs ==
Athletic programs include boys and girls Basketball, boys and girls Cross country, boys and girls Track and field, girls Volleyball, and boys Wrestling.

Carpentersville Middle School students can participate in music programs such as Marching, Concert, and Jazz band, Orchestra, and Choir. In 2017, the 8th grade band premiered the song The Dawnland, composed by Joni Greene, who was helped by the band.

In 2018, Michael Kasper and Beth Wood, band and orchestra teachers, were named Music Educators of the Year by the Elgin Youth Symphony Orchestra. EYSO Artistic Director Randal Swiggum said "[i]t's unusual for us to give this award to two teachers in one year, but this is a dynamic duo."

Carpentersville Middle School participates in the Advancement Via Individual Determination. AVID's mission is "...to close the achievement gap by preparing all students for college readiness and success in a global society."

== Staff ==
12% of Carpentersville Middle School teachers were in their first or second year of teaching, compared to the Middle School average of 8%. The teacher absenteeism rate, at 3%, is significantly below the national Middle School average of 24%. The salary expenditure per teacher is $54,129, slightly higher than the national Middle School average of about $52,386.

== Food pantry ==
On August 31, 2016, a food pantry opened at Carpentersville Middle School. The first year operations cost was $42,000. The food pantry is open every Wednesday from 5 pm to 7 pm and serves an estimated 100 families weekly.

== See also ==
- Middle School
- Dundee-Crown High School
- Carpentersville, Illinois
- Community Unit School District 300
