= Dundee-Crown High School =

High school in Chicago suburbs

Coordinates: 42.135914°N 88.268553°W

Location
- 1500 Kings Road; Carpentersville, Illinois; United States

Information
- Type: Public secondary
- Established: Fall of 1983
- Status: Open
- School district: CUSD 300
- Category: High School
- Oversight: Community Unit School District 300
- Principal: Dr. Asia Gurney
- Teaching staff: 168.43 (FTE)
- Grades: 9-12
- Enrollment: 2,561 (2023–2024)
- Student to teacher ratio: 15.21
- Hours in school day: Appx 7.5 hours
- Colors: Royal blue and red
- Athletics conference: Fox valley conference
- Mascot: The Charger
- Nickname: Chargers
- Rival: Harry D Jacobs High School
- SAT average: 1120
- Website: dchs.d300.org

Dundee-Crown High School is a high school located in Carpentersville, Illinois, United States, a northwest suburb of Chicago.

Dundee-Crown High School was made from consolidating Dundee Community High School and Irving Crown High school in 1983. It is an AAA school for IHSA sports. Dundee-Crown serves 2,529 students and is one of three high schools in Community School District 300.

The school serves people from Carpentersville (the majority), the east half of Algonquin, East Dundee, portions of West Dundee, Sleepy Hollow, southwest Cary, southwest Fox River Grove, western Barrington Hills and western South Barrington.

== Feeder patterns ==
Elementary schools that feed into Dundee-Crown include: Algonquin Lakes, Eastview, Golfview, Meadowdale, Parkview, Perry, Dundee Highlands, and Sleepy Hollow.

Intermediate schools and middle schools that feed into Dundee-Crown include: Carpentersville (6-8), Dundee (6-8) (partial), and Algonquin (6-8).

== History ==
Dundee Community High School was opened in 1873 to serve members of the Dundee community settlement in Northwest Illinois. The school was located at the corner of 6th Street and Kane Street on a hill overlooking the Fox River. The building is now called the Union School Apartments. In the 1920s a separate high school building was built on Western Ave. (Illinois Route 31) and Hillside Street, on the northern edge of West Dundee. This school would hold the only State Champion team in the combined school history in 1938 with its boys basketball team under Coach Eugene de Lacey. In 1953, the school district obtained federal funds to build a new building at 300 Cleveland Avenue in Carpentersville, and the old building became Dundee Junior High School/Dundee Middle School. However, Spain Field located immediately to the north of the old school was retained for varsity sports. The school would remain at that location from 1953 until 1983. The school served all of District 300 except for Hampshire.

Irving Crown High school was built in 1965 when the communities being served grew too large for one school to accommodate all students. Crown opened with just sophomores and juniors, with seniors being allowed to graduate from Dundee. The Irving Crown Vikings were housed at the building that is now Dundee-Crown. At this time, both schools served grades 10-12. In 1969, District 300 shifted to a middle school system, where both schools served grades 9-12.

Subsequently, District 300 experienced dramatic population growth west of the Fox River, and Jacobs High School was opened. The remaining population did not justify two high schools on the east side of the Fox River, and in 1983, the once rival Cardunals (for Carpentersville, Dundee, Algonquin) and Vikings became the Chargers beginning in 1984. The combined program is housed in the former Crown High School building, and the Dundee Community High School building became a middle school. The old Dundee Middle School and Spain Field were sold for development and are now the Spring Hill Marketplace Shopping Center.

== Dundee-Crown Today ==
Dundee-Crown is currently located at 1500 Kings Road, Carpentersville, Illinois. The pseudo address of 1 Charger Country is also used. The school accommodates the majority of Carpentersville, East Dundee, West Dundee, Sleepy Hollow, the east half of Algonquin and also small parts of Cary, Fox River Grove, and Barrington Hills. Demographically there is a large diversity of students.

=== Block Scheduling ===
Dundee Crown was known for utilizing a block scheduling system as opposed to a traditional class scheduling system through the 2011-2012 school year, after which, all high schools in District 300. Students would, through block scheduling, surpass most traditional high school credit totals because students can earn up to 32 high school credits upon graduation. Students attending Dundee-Crown would have three to four classes per day, each of a ninety-minute duration, with a forty-minute 'Flex Block' designed for students to eat lunch in addition to acting as an interim resource class. 'Flex-Block' allowed students to participate in a plethora of clubs and activities during the school day and participate in sports and extracurricular activities after school. Financial problems with the school district nearly caused a termination of this program, but a 2006 referendum averted this. However, in January 2008 Flex Block was canceled and replaced with a much different scheduling system.

==== Controversy Over Removal of Flex Block ====
Dundee-Crown did not meet the average yearly progress quota. As a result, the administration has decided to experiment with a new schedule. The new schedule consisted of blocks one and two, followed by "Charge It Up", or C.U.P. (displays characteristics of a study hall), and immediately followed by an ABC lunch system and fourth block. Additionally, the passing periods were reduced to seven minutes, rather than the ten minutes that students had grown accustomed to.

High school students wishing to further progress their studies on a higher level attend classes at Elgin Community College during school hours. Some feel that they had a much more perilous journey rushing to arrive from Dundee-Crown to Elgin Community College. The schedule change made for a shorter driving time to arrive safely at their designated college class due to the fact that they would not be able to leave as early. A great deal of past students in the program have expressed concern about the issues that this brought about.

==== Charge it Up! ====
Charge It Up! also known as C.U.P. was a system implemented by the Dundee-Crown administration to serve as a remedy for the removal of Flex Block. Similar to a study hall, students were required to complete "Academic Activities". Students could leave their Charge it Up! rooms in order to attend club meetings, take missed tests, use the media center for projects or papers, or ask teachers for help with schoolwork. However, in order to leave their Charge it Up! rooms, students were required to get their passes signed by their destination teacher, coach, or supervisors and then have it signed by their Charge it Up! teachers. Mondays are "No Movement" days, in which no students was allowed to use his or her pass. Every other Monday, the students would receive a small "Charger Lesson" that usually discussed DCHS events. However, as compared to the previous flex block, C.U.P. was only 30 minutes long, with five of these minutes for announcements.

== Athletics ==
Dundee-Crown competes in the Fox Valley Conference (FVC) and is a member of the Illinois High School Association (IHSA). Teams are stylized as the Chargers.

The following teams have placed in their respective IHSA sponsored state championship tournaments:

- Basketball (boys): 4th place (2008–09)
- Wrestling: 4th place (1984–85, 2003–04)
- Cross Country (boys: 10th place (2007-2008) 17th place (2017-2018)
- Track and Field (boys): 3rd place in the 4 x 800 meter relay at the IHSA State Finals 2018

Dundee-Crown has an active Athletic Hall of Fame that recognizes the schools' (Dundee Community High School [closed], Irving Crown High School [closed], and the combined, current Dundee-Crown High School) rich athletic history.

== Clubs and Activities ==
Dundee-Crown offers clubs after school, including Adelante, Anime Club, Art Club, Beta Club, Black Youth Alliance, Debate, Drama Club, Educators Rising, E-Sports, Fellowship of Christian Athletes, Future Healthcare Professionals, Girl Up, LGBT+ Club, the Literary Arts Magazine, National Honors Society, Psi Alpha, Rotary Interact, SALT, Scholastic Bowl, Science Olympiad, Souls Spill Ink, Strategy Game Club, Student Council, Umbrella Club, and World Language Club.

== Notable alumni ==
- Juan Acevedo, Major League Baseball pitcher, once owned Detroit Tigers record for saves in a season
- Nina M. Armagno, United States Space Force lieutenant general who served as director of staff of the Office of the Chief of Space Operations
- Ryan Court, Major League Baseball infielder
- Mark Kellar, Northern Illinois University and pro football player (graduated from Irving Crown High school)
- Ken Menke, University of Illinois and professional basketball player (graduated from Dundee Community HS)
- Jessica Mink, astronomer and part of the team that discovered the rings around Uranus (graduated from Dundee Community HS)
- Chaz Ortiz, professional skateboarder
