= Retail life cycle =

Business concept

The retail life cycle theory holds that retail institutions experience the cycle of innovation, growth, maturity and decline, like goods and services that they sell, similar to that of the product life cycle. The market traits and strategies which are taken by retail institutions should differ in variable stages of retail life cycle. The theory of retail life cycle is first introduced by William Davidson WR, Betas AD and Bass SJ in 1976.

== Description ==
The founders of this assumption took the American retail industry as the research object and then pointed out that the period of different new business forms from innovation stage to maturity stage is gradually shortened, reflecting the rule of retail cycle. Masonand Mayer selected over a dozen of different retail organizations in the USA in 1987 to further explain and verify this theory.

Retail life cycle theory explains how the existing retail formats develop and why the retail formats develop in this way. Many different factors, such as price cycle, market environment and macroeconomic fluctuations and so on, are attributed to the influence of retail life cycle, which makes the theory more convincing.

However, this theory does not point out what are determinants of changes of retail formats and why the retail life cycle exists. In addition, the influence of interactions and responses consumers is not considered.

=== Different stages of retail life cycle ===
==== Innovation stage ====
In the innovation stage, in which the reformation and development of business methods promote the emergence of new retail formats, the operating characteristics of new formats have not been understood by both consumers and the industry, lowering market share. Moreover, because of the development cost of new formats, it is hard for retail companies, which apply the new methods, to make profit at this stage.

This theory holds that the innovation in retail institutions is realized through the reformation of business methods. The reformation of business methods is mainly realized by decreasing the cost of operation and the price of products or services. However, it may also be innovated through improvement of product mix, customer service, sales, store selection, store design or sales promotion, business hours, logistics system and other ways, some of which are usually combined and innovated. Sometimes the company which leads the new retail format may become the target of hit. During the period, the emergence of new forms can also lead to the blow of competitors and retaliation. In this stage, it has little impact on the existing competitive structure for its low market share.

==== Growth stage ====
In the growth stage, Langlois, R., & Robertson, P. (1995) points out that the new business formats start to be accepted by consumers and traits of new formats are widely understood in the industry. As a result, the market share begins to ascend and copycats are also on the rise. The competition between companies that apply traditional methods and new methods gets more intense. At that time, companies who have reformed their operating activities firstly can increase the marker sales and the profitability.

At the meanwhile, the competition between companies of new and original retail formats begin to turn out white-hot. With the rapid growth of reformed companies, customers of companies without innovation intend to choose products and services of innovative companies. Therefore, the unreformed retail institutions begin to take various actions to stop the decline of customers. In fact, many companies, which use original retail formats, meet challenges of new formats with the positive attitude and apply some new methods in the existing formats. The competition of different retail formats is unique and increase the vitality in the market.

Later in the stage, with the wide application of new formats, the competition of companies which accept new formats will emerge and augment. The competition of different retail formats does not take the main role in the market. In the competition of new formats, some companies lacking competence start considering to leave the market. The remaining companies are inclined to take actions like improvement of service standard, expanding the commodity portfolio and improvement of shop facilities. Despite the continuing growth of sales, the cost will surge as well. Apart from the direct cost, indirect cost will increase sharply including promotion cost and the expense incurred by the increasing size of the organization. The cost may be higher than the sales and companies will face the non-profit situation.

==== Maturity stage ====
In this stage, companies of new retail formats are incapable of taking more market share and expand the customers' base. In this period, companies which won out in the growth stage are trying to maintain the market share. However, the profit margin begins to decline because the new retail formats could not make any company have edge on the others and companies have to decrease the price in order to defeat competitors. Therefore, how to decrease the cost is the main problem that each enterprise faces. In order to pursue the differential advantage in the period of competition, the enterprises compete to make the market more mature and stable. Characteristics of new formats have been gradually lost and new formats change to traditional formats. Thus it becomes an important opportunity for the emergency of another new format.

For chain businesses, in this stage, they need to consider closing inefficient shops and open new shops in good addresses as well as develop to diversified and compound retail organization. It should be pointed out that the retail format even in the maturity stage can be improved to make the company come back to the growth stage. According to the research of Sun, L., Kay, R., & Chew, M. (2009), department stores in the United States has been in the maturity stage after World War II. After that, the development of shopping centers gave department stores an opportunity to grow again because department stores were different at that time form before, and they were reformed based on the model of shopping centers.

==== Decline stage ====
In decline stage, the new formats have become the traditional ones and with the change of consumers' buying behavior and the appearance of newer formats, the market begins to shrink and traditional formats (original new formats) could not make any profit but may suffer great loss due to the decreasing sales. During this period, some companies decide to leave the market. As a result, the competition among the same retail formats is not serious, but the competition of different formats will get increasingly intense.

Companies of the traditional format compete through the price, which makes their profit get less and less. Companies of the new format have edge on the others due to their advantages in other aspects like service, product quality and operation style. The situation of decline stage is similar to the innovation stage but in the term of traditional formats.

After this stage, the market will enter the next life cycle.
