= Rutland Township, Kane County, Illinois =

Rutland Township
- Township
- Location in Kane County

- Kane County's location in Illinois
- Coordinates: 42°06′33″N 88°25′18″W
- Country: United States
- State: Illinois
- County: Kane
- Established: November 6, 1849

Area
  - Total: 36.24 sq mi (93.9 km^{2})
  - Land: 36.15 sq mi (93.6 km^{2})
  - Water: 0.09 sq mi (0.23 km^{2}) 0.24%
- Elevation: 902 ft (275 m)

Population (2020)
  - Total: 26,666
  - Density: 737.6/sq mi (284.8/km^{2})
- Time zone: UTC-6 (CST)
  - Summer (DST): UTC-5 (CDT)
- ZIP codes: 60102, 60110, 60118, 60124, 60136, 60140, 60142
- FIPS code: 17-089-66430
- Website: www.rutlandtownship.com

Rutland Township is one of sixteen townships in Kane County, Illinois. As of the 2020 census, its population was 26,666 and it contained 10,927 housing units. It was originally called Jackson Township; the name was changed to Rutland on July 2, 1850.

== Geography ==
According to the 2021 census gazetteer files, Rutland Township has a total area of 36.24 square miles (93.86 km^{2}), of which 36.15 square miles (93.63 km^{2}) (or 99.76%) is land and 0.09 square miles (0.23 km^{2}) (or 0.24%) is water.

=== Cities, towns, villages ===
- Algonquin (west edge)
- Carpentersville (partial)
- Elgin (partial)
- Gilberts (vast majority)
- Hampshire (east edge)
- Huntley (partial)
- Pingree Grove (vast majority)
- West Dundee (west edge)

=== Unincorporated towns ===
- Binnie Hills at 42.1211361°N 88.3636941°W
- Binnie Lakes at 42.1164139°N 88.3595271°W
- Freeman at 42.124747°N 88.388417°W
- Starks at 42.0883585°N 88.456751°W
- The Landings at 42.1386357°N 88.4025844°W

(This list is based on USGS data and may include former settlements.)

=== Airports and landing strips ===
- Koppie Airport
- Landings Condominium Airport
- Olivers Heliport
- Reid RLA Airport

=== Cemeteries ===
The township contains these two cemeteries: Buena Vista and Saint Mary's Catholic.

=== Major highways ===
- Interstate 90
- U.S. Route 20
- Illinois Route 47

== Demographics ==
As of the 2020 census there were 26,666 people, 10,027 households, and 6,881 families residing in the township. The population density was 735.86 inhabitants per square mile (284.12/km^{2}). There were 10,927 housing units at an average density of 301.53 per square mile (116.42/km^{2}). The racial makeup of the township was 74.54% White, 2.98% African American, 0.36% Native American, 7.26% Asian, 0.02% Pacific Islander, 5.28% from other races, and 9.54% from two or more races. Hispanic or Latino of any race were 15.57% of the population.

There were 10,027 households, out of which 26.40% had children under the age of 18 living with them, 61.50% were married couples living together, 4.04% had a female householder with no spouse present, and 31.38% were non-families. 26.20% of all households were made up of individuals, and 15.80% had someone living alone who was 65 years of age or older. The average household size was 2.43 and the average family size was 2.87.

The township's age distribution consisted of 22.7% under the age of 18, 2.7% from 18 to 24, 23.9% from 25 to 44, 25.5% from 45 to 64, and 25.2% who were 65 years of age or older. The median age was 45.7 years. For every 100 females, there were 93.2 males. For every 100 females age 18 and over, there were 89.2 males.

The median income for a household in the township was $80,375, and the median income for a family was $95,417. Males had a median income of $67,432 versus $46,408 for females. The per capita income for the township was $39,093. About 3.0% of families and 7.4% of the population were below the poverty line, including 7.1% of those under age 18 and 9.7% of those age 65 or over.

Historical population
Census	Pop.	Note	%±
2000	4,062		—
2010	18,806		363.0%
2020	26,666		41.8%
U.S. Decennial Census

== School districts ==
- Community Unit School District 300
- Huntley Consolidated School District 158

== Political districts ==
- Illinois's 8th congressional district
- Illinois's 11th congressional district
- State House District 70
- State Senate District 35
