= Ryan Court =

American baseball player (born 1988)

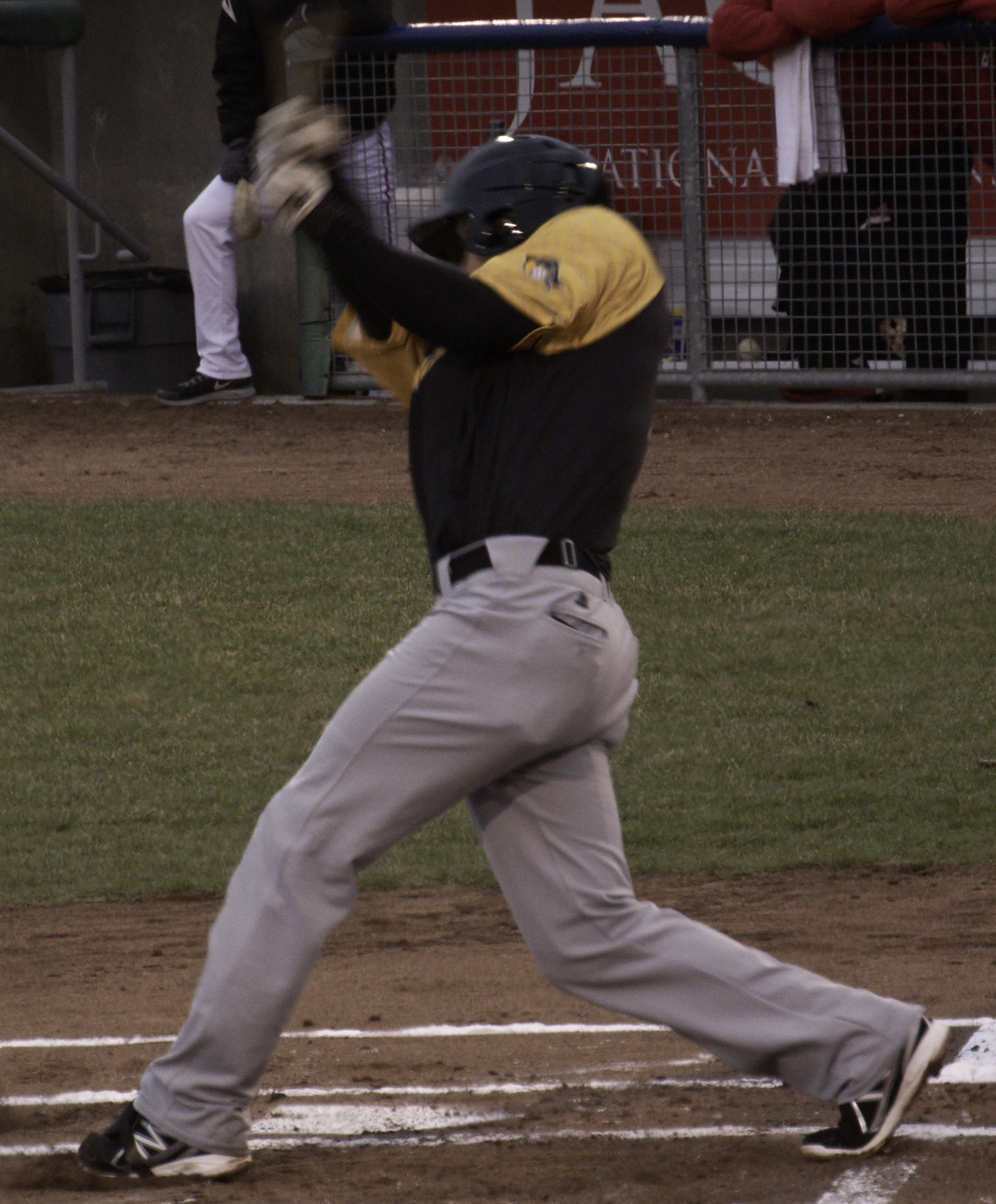
- Court with the South Bend Silver Hawks in 2014
- Infielder
- Born: May 28, 1988 (age 38); Elgin, Illinois, U.S.
- Batted: Right Threw: Right

MLB debut
- July 26, 2019, for the Seattle Mariners

Last MLB appearance
- September 8, 2019, for the Seattle Mariners

MLB statistics
- Batting average: .208
- Home runs: 1
- Runs batted in: 5
- Stats at Baseball Reference

Teams
- Seattle Mariners (2019)

Ryan Arthur Court (born May 28, 1988) is an American former professional baseball infielder. He played in Major League Baseball (MLB) for one season for the Seattle Mariners.

== Career ==
=== Arizona Diamondbacks ===
Court attended Dundee-Crown High School in Carpentersville, Illinois. He attended Illinois State University and played college baseball for the Redbirds. He was drafted by the Arizona Diamondbacks in the 23rd round of the 2011 MLB draft.

Court played in the Diamondbacks organization from 2011 through 2014. During his time with them, he played for the Missoula Osprey, South Bend Silver Hawks, Visalia Rawhide, and Mobile BayBears. Court was released by Arizona on March 30, 2015.

=== Sioux City Explorers ===
Court played for the Sioux City Explorers of the American Association of Independent Professional Baseball for the 2015 season.

=== Boston Red Sox ===
Court signed a minor league contract with the Boston Red Sox on May 2, 2016. He played for the Double–A Portland Sea Dogs and the Triple–A Pawtucket Red Sox during the 2016 season.

Court spent the 2017 season with Pawtucket, playing in 106 games and hitting .263/.347/.410 with 10 home runs and 44 RBI. He elected free agency following the season on November 6, 2017.

=== Chicago Cubs ===
On December 9, 2017, Court signed a minor league contract with the Chicago Cubs. In 2018, he played in 114 games for the Triple–A Iowa Cubs, batting .262/.362/.407 with 11 home runs and 62 RBI. Court was released by the Cubs organization on March 23, 2019.

=== Sugar Land Skeeters ===
Following his release from the Cubs, Court signed with the Sugar Land Skeeters of the Atlantic League of Professional Baseball.

=== Seattle Mariners ===
On May 7, 2019, the Seattle Mariners purchased his contract from Sugar Land and assigned him to the Triple–A Tacoma Rainiers.

On July 26, 2019, the Mariners selected Court's contract and promoted him to the major leagues for the first time. He made his major league debut later that day pinch hitting in the bottom of the ninth inning against the Detroit Tigers. On August 9, Court hit his first home run against Emilio Pagan of the Tampa Bay Rays in the 9th inning. Court was designated for assignment on September 10. He was removed from the 40-man roster and outrighted to Tacoma on September 11. Court elected free agency following the season on November 4.

=== Oakland Athletics ===
On January 28, 2020, Court signed a minor league contract with the Oakland Athletics. Court did not play in a game in 2020 due to the cancellation of the minor league season because of the COVID-19 pandemic. He became a free agent on November 2.
