= Community Unit School District 300 =

School district in Chicago suburbs

Community Unit School District 300 is a school district headquartered in Algonquin, Illinois, United States, a suburb of Chicago. The current superintendent of schools is Martina Smith.

The district is the 6th largest school district in the State located in northern Kane County and portions of southeastern McHenry County, Illinois. The district includes Algonquin, Carpentersville, East Dundee, West Dundee, Sleepy Hollow, Gilberts, Pingree Grove, Hampshire, Lake in the Hills and Cary. The district also has portions in Cook County.

In January 2015, District 300 opened a new administration building in Algonquin next to Jacobs High School replacing the former administration building in Carpentersville.

== Schools ==
=== High schools ===
- Dundee-Crown High School (Carpentersville)
- Hampshire High School (Hampshire)
- Harry D. Jacobs High School (Algonquin)

=== K-8 schools ===
- Cambridge Lakes Charter School (Pingree Grove)
- Westfield Community School (Algonquin)

=== Alternative schools ===
- Oak Ridge School (Carpentersville Middle School, and high school)

=== Middle schools ===
- Algonquin Middle School (Algonquin)
- Carpentersville Middle School (Carpentersville)
- Dundee Middle School (West Dundee)
- Hampshire Middle School (Hampshire)

=== Elementary schools ===
- Algonquin Lakes Elementary School (Unincorporated Kane County)
- Big Timber Elementary School (Hampshire)
- Dundee Highlands Elementary School (West Dundee)
- Eastview Elementary School (Algonquin)
- Gary D. Wright Elementary School (Unincorporated Kane County)
- Gilberts Elementary School (Unincorporated Kane County)
- Golfview Elementary School (Carpentersville)
- Hampshire Elementary School (Hampshire)
- Lake in the Hills Elementary School (Lake in the Hills)
- Lakewood Elementary School (Carpentersville)
- Liberty Elementary School (Carpentersville)
- Lincoln Prairie Elementary School (Lake in the Hills)
- Meadowdale Elementary School (Carpentersville)
- Kenneth E. Neubert Elementary School (Algonquin)
- Parkview Elementary School (Carpentersville)
- Perry Elementary School (Carpentersville)
- Sleepy Hollow Elementary School (Sleepy Hollow)
- Wright Elementary School (Hampshire)

=== Preschools ===
- deLacey Family Education Center (Carpentersville)
