= Milk Pail Restaurant =

- Country Tea Room
- U.S. National Register of Historic Places
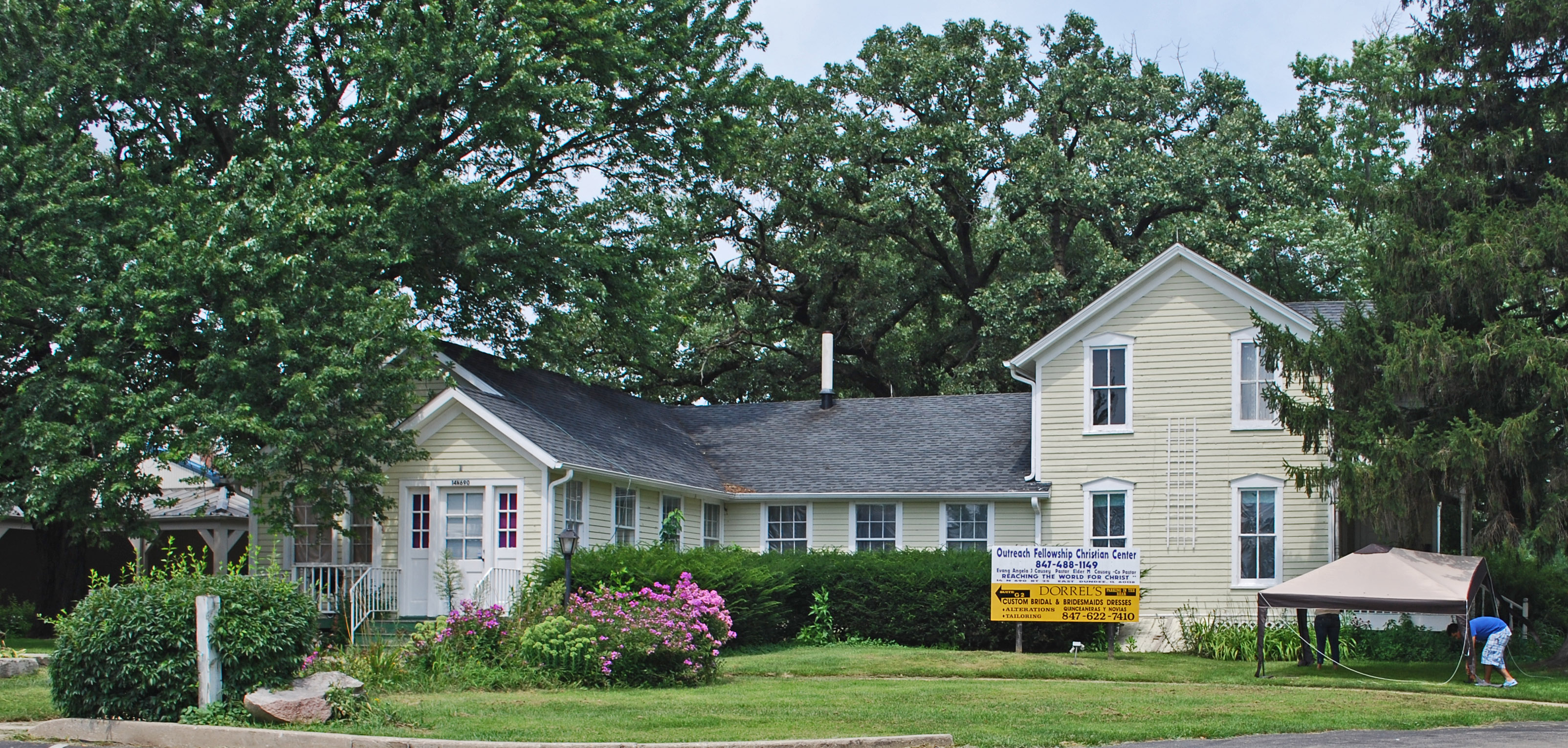
- Original County Tea Room from the 1860s

- Location within Illinois Location within the United States
- Location: 14N630 IL 25; Dundee Township, Kane County, Illinois, United States
- Coordinates: 42°4′36″N 88°15′36″W
- Built: 1860s
- Architectural style: Gablefront house
- NRHP reference No.: 99000164
- Added to NRHP: February 25, 1999

The Milk Pail Restaurant, formerly known as the Country Tea Room, is a historic restaurant (tearoom) in unincorporated Dundee Township, Kane County, Illinois, United States. It was originally a farmhouse for Increase C. Bosworth, who operated the farm as a creamery. He sold it to Max McGraw in 1926, who converted into a teahouse restaurant. To meet the demands of the changing tastes of travelers in the 1930s, the teahouse was converted into a full restaurant, featuring game from McGraw's nearby game preserve. The main building was listed on the National Register of Historic Places in 1999.

== History ==
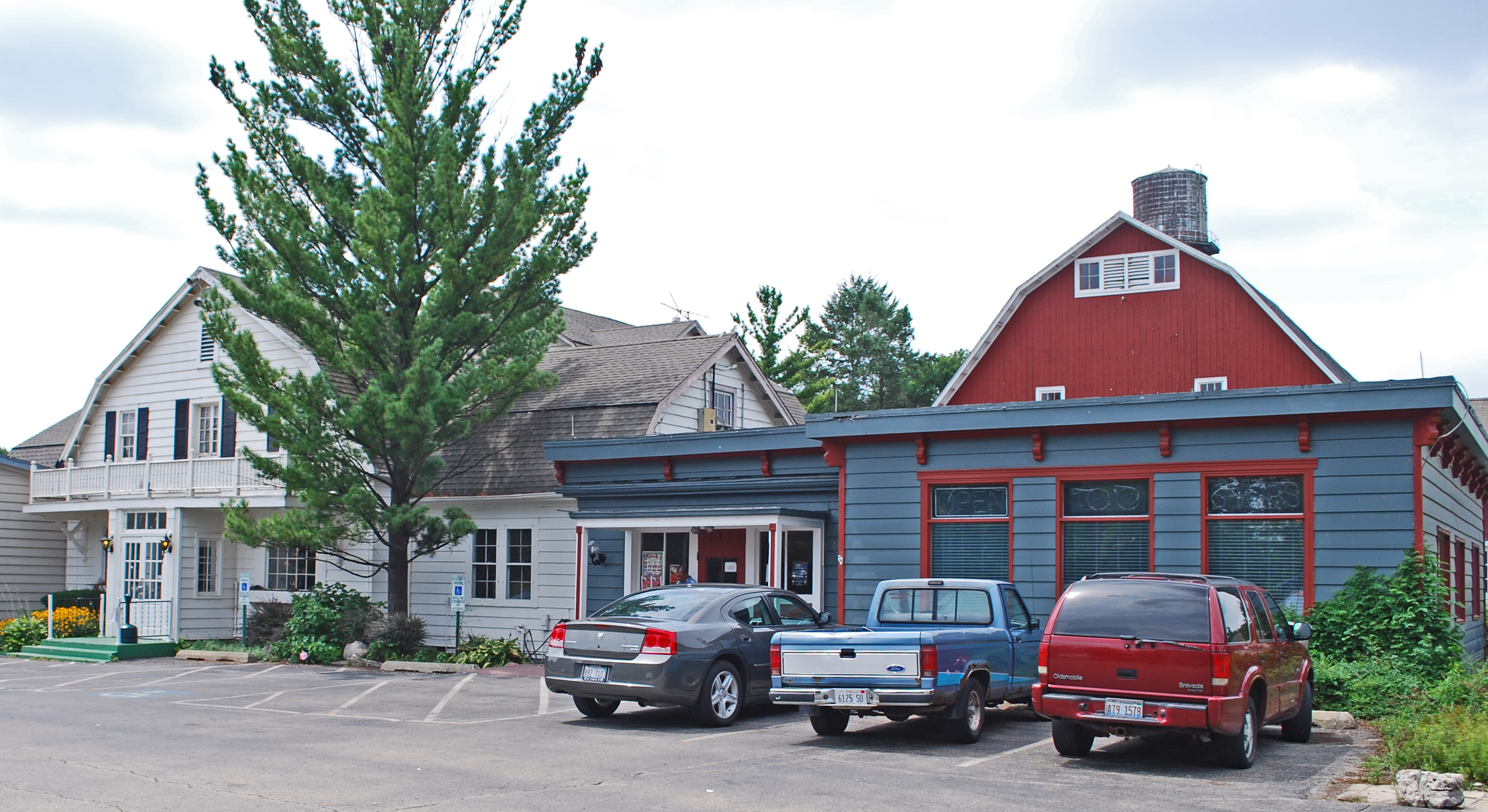
Milk Pail restaurant from front parking lot

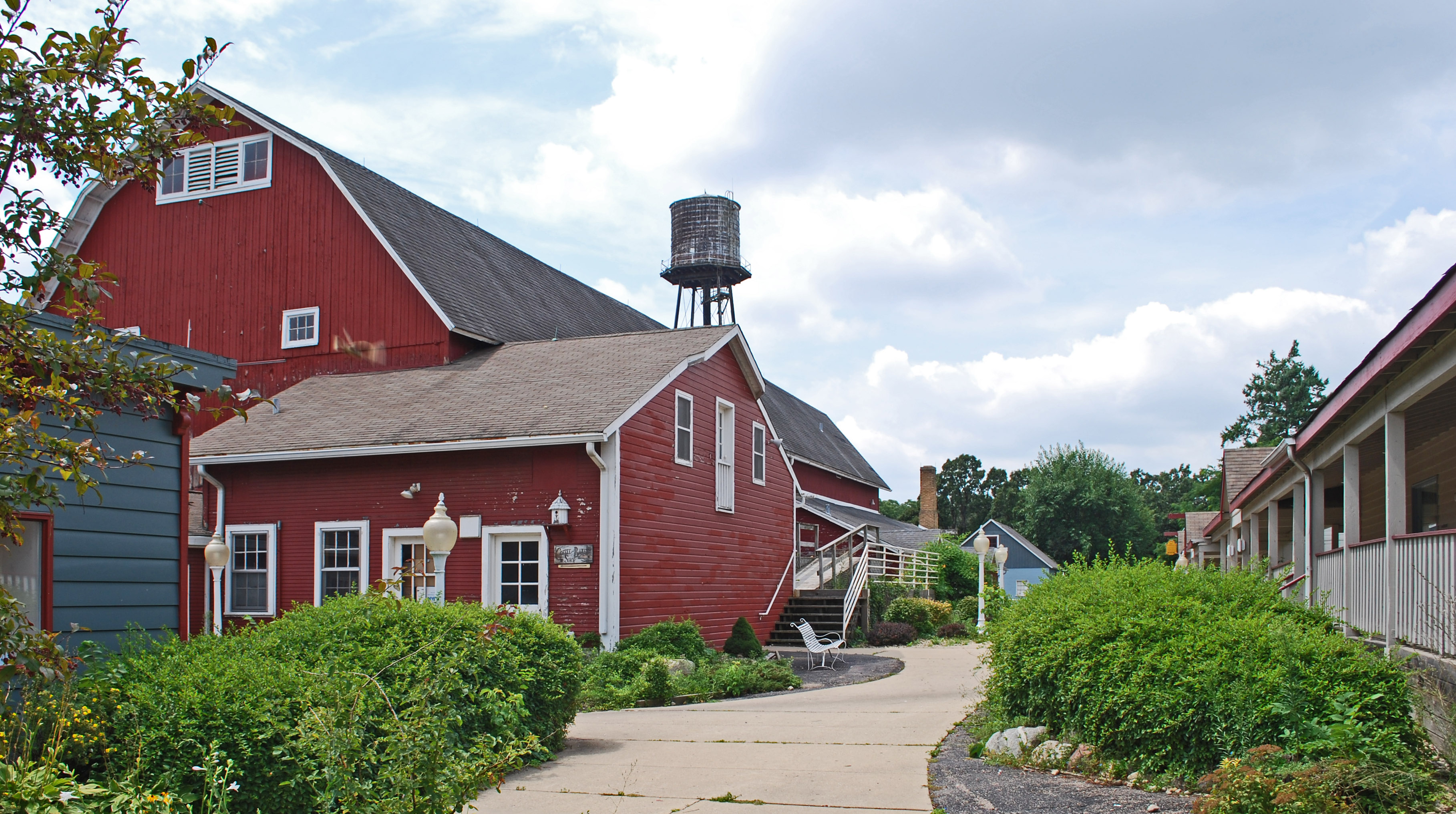
Outbuldings behind restaurant

The northern Fox River Valley was first settled in the 1830s. Originally profiting from its natural resources, the region eventually expanded into manufacturing, even earning connections to the Chicago and North Western Railroad in Carpentersville. Increase C. Bosworth, a wealthy businessman from Chicago, settled in the area in 1837. He purchased a 136-acre (55 ha) property from a Mr. Clark in 1860. He constructed a farm by the 1860s that featured a farmhouse, windmill, and creamery. The house was in the gablefront style with Italianate details.

Illinois State Route 25 was to be built in the early 20th century to serve the east side of the Fox River, running from Oswego to Algonquin. Bosworth's residence was located on grounds adjacent to the planned highway. Seeing an opportunity for development, Max McGraw purchased the property in 1926. McGraw was beginning to accrue great wealth in manufacturing, due to the success of his Toastmaster products. He added a single-story extension later that year. Route 25 was opened in 1929, and the Country Tea Room, like many roadside restaurants in its day, flourished. The road was an important shipment route for dairy products and provided a route for tourists seeking to visit Wisconsin to the north. Customers enjoyed toasting their own bread with McGraw's invention, and some bought Toastmasters for their own homes. When the restaurant first opened, dining options for automobile travelers were limited to picnics or fancy hotels. Roadside restaurants filled the need for other options for travelers in the 1920s and 1930s. McGraw also maintained the dairy operations of the farm until 1939.

By the end of the 1930s, roadside eateries were spread throughout most major highways. To stay competitive, restaurants needed to provide variety for their patrons, to stand out from other establishments. The Country Tea Room initially struggled with this change, but was able to reinvent itself as the Milk Pail Restaurant, a full restaurant with unique entrees. Part of the property was converted into The Fin 'n Feather Catalogue, which sold smoked game, some of which featured on the Milk Pail menu. McGraw bought the surrounding land, named it the McGraw Wildlife Foundation, and opened it as a private game preserve. The main building was added to the National Register of Historic Places on February 25, 1999. Today, the Milk Pail remains open and is a popular local location for wedding receptions.

The original building faces east while the 1926 addition faces south. The barn, creamery, and stable that once served the farm still stand to the southwest, although they have been modified throughout their existence and do not contribute to the site's historical value. A parking lot lies to the main building's north and east. The two-story house as a small one-story addition that was built before the early 1900s. The Country Tea House extension in 1926 was built on the west side of the house. The vernacular, wood panel house sits on a stone foundation. A chimney is found on the north side of the building. Windows on the east and south elevations feature wooden pediments, those on the north side do not. Asphalt shingles adorn the roof.
