= Allens Corner =

Allens Corner may refer to:

- Allens Corners, Illinois, U.S.
- Allens Corner, New Jersey, U.S.
- Allens Corner, Ontario, Canada

== See also ==
- Aldens Corners, Wisconsin, U.S.
- Allans Corners, Ontario, Canada
