= Freeman, Illinois =

- Unincorporated community
- Location within Illinois Location within the United States
- Coordinates: 42°07′29″N 88°23′18″W
- Country: United States
- State: Illinois
- County: Kane
- Township: Rutland
- Elevation: 899 ft (274 m)
- Time zone: UTC-6 (Central (CST))
  - Summer (DST): UTC-5 (CDT)
- Area codes: 847 & 224
- GNIS feature ID: 1816281

Freeman is an unincorporated community in Kane County, in the U.S. state of Illinois.

== History ==
Freeman was named for John Freeman, the original owner of the land where the town was built.
