= Charles H. Backus =

American politician

Charles Henry Backus (June 9, 1856 – June 24, 1929) was an American businessman and politician.

Backus was born in Chaplin, Connecticut where he lived on a farm and went to the local schools. He went to college in Poughkeepsie, New York. He moved to Illinois and eventually settled in Hampshire, Illinois where he established the Kane County Bank in 1882. Backus served in the Illinois House of Representatives from 1901 to 1907 and was a Republican. Backus died at his home in Hampshire, Illinois.
