= Hampshire, Illinois =

- Village
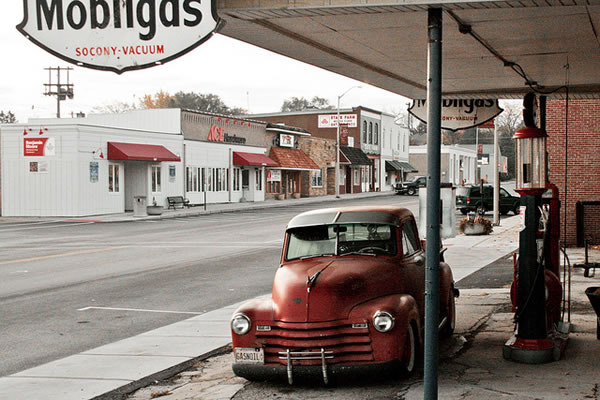
- Original Mobil gas station in downtown Hampshire

- Location of Hampshire in Kane County, Illinois
- Coordinates: 42°06′50″N 88°28′33″W
- Country: United States
- State: Illinois
- County: Kane, McHenry
- Townships: Hampshire, Rutland, Coral

Government
  - Village President: Mike Reid, Jr.

Area
  - Total: 9.51 sq mi (24.62 km^{2})
  - Land: 9.51 sq mi (24.62 km^{2})
  - Water: 0 sq mi (0.00 km^{2})
- Elevation: 951 ft (290 m)

Population (2020)
  - Total: 7,667
  - Density: 806.6/sq mi (311.43/km^{2})
- Time zone: UTC-6 (CST)
  - Summer (DST): UTC-5 (CDT)
- ZIP code: 60140
- Area code(s): 847, 224
- FIPS code: 17-32525
- GNIS feature ID: 2398234
- Website: www.hampshireil.org

Hampshire is a village in Kane and McHenry counties, Illinois, United States. As of the 2020 census it had a population of 7,667.

== Geography ==
Hampshire is located in northwestern Kane County. Most of the village is in Hampshire Township, and a small portion extends east into Rutland Township as well north into Coral Township in McHenry Country. The village is bordered to the northeast by Huntley and to the southeast by Pingree Grove. It is bordered to the southwest by Burlington.

Illinois Route 72 passes through the southern part of the village, leading east 4 miles (6 km) to Starks and west 8 miles (13 km) to Genoa. U.S. Route 20 passes through the northeastern outskirts of the village, leading northwest 13 miles (21 km) to Marengo and southeast 12 miles (19 km) to Elgin. Hampshire is 52 miles (84 km) northwest of the center of Chicago.

According to the 2021 census gazetteer files, Hampshire has a total area of 9.51 square miles (24.63 km^{2}), all land.

== Demographics ==
Historical population
Census	Pop.	Note	%±
1880	483		—
1890	696		44.1%
1900	760		9.2%
1910	697		−8.3%
1920	618		−11.3%
1930	656		6.1%
1940	757		15.4%
1950	970		28.1%
1960	1,309		34.9%
1970	1,611		23.1%
1980	1,735		7.7%
1990	1,843		6.2%
2000	2,900		57.4%
2010	5,563		91.8%
2020	7,667		37.8%
U.S. Decennial Census

=== Racial and ethnic composition ===
Hampshire village, Illinois – Racial and ethnic composition Note: the US Census treats Hispanic/Latino as an ethnic category. This table excludes Latinos from the racial categories and assigns them to a separate category. Hispanics/Latinos may be of any race.
Race / Ethnicity (NH = Non-Hispanic)	Pop 2000	Pop 2010	Pop 2020	% 2000	% 2010	% 2020
White alone (NH)	2,802	4,787	5,832	96.62%	86.05%	76.07%
Black or African American alone (NH)	3	66	177	0.10%	1.19%	2.31%
Native American or Alaska Native alone (NH)	6	6	8	0.21%	0.11%	0.10%
Asian alone (NH)	4	99	169	0.14%	1.78%	2.20%
Pacific Islander alone (NH)	0	0	4	0.00%	0.00%	0.05%
Other race alone (NH)	0	0	16	0.00%	0.00%	0.21%
Mixed race or Multiracial (NH)	15	56	248	0.52%	1.01%	3.23%
Hispanic or Latino (any race)	70	549	1,213	2.41%	9.87%	15.82%
Total	2,900	5,563	7,667	100.00%	100.00%	100.00%

=== 2020 census ===
As of the 2020 census, Hampshire had a population of 7,667. The median age was 35.6 years. 28.3% of residents were under the age of 18 and 11.4% of residents were 65 years of age or older. For every 100 females there were 97.0 males, and for every 100 females age 18 and over there were 93.8 males age 18 and over.

94.8% of residents lived in urban areas, while 5.2% lived in rural areas.

There were 2,664 households in Hampshire, including 1,458 families. Of those households, 42.8% had children under the age of 18 living in them. Of all households, 59.9% were married-couple households, 13.2% were households with a male householder and no spouse or partner present, and 19.5% were households with a female householder and no spouse or partner present. About 17.1% of all households were made up of individuals and 6.5% had someone living alone who was 65 years of age or older.

There were 2,773 housing units, of which 3.9% were vacant. The homeowner vacancy rate was 1.7% and the rental vacancy rate was 8.1%. The population density was 806.63 inhabitants per square mile (311.44/km^{2}), and housing density was 291.74 per square mile (112.64/km^{2}).

=== Income and poverty ===
The median income for a household in the village was $99,635, and the median income for a family was $114,478. Males had a median income of $74,238 versus $33,946 for females. The per capita income for the village was $49,998. About 1.6% of families and 7.2% of the population were below the poverty line, including 3.2% of those under age 18 and 21.5% of those age 65 or over.

== Education ==
Community Unit School District 300 consists of Hampshire High School, Hampshire Middle School, Hampshire Elementary School, Gary D. Wright Elementary, and Big Timber Elementary. The high school's mascot is the "Whip-Pur", a cat-like creature whose name derives from the school colors, white and purple.

== Notable people ==
- Charles H. Backus, Illinois state representative and businessman
- Jake Goebbert, former San Diego Padres player, graduate of Hampshire High School.
