= Carpenter Park, Carpentersville =

Park in Chicago suburbs

Carpenter Park
- Interactive map of Carpenter Park
- Location: 351 Carpenter Blvd
- Nearest town: Carpentersville, IL
- Coordinates: 42.109°N 88.282°W
- Established: 1850s
- Website: www.cville.org

Carpenter Park is a park in Carpentersville, IL, a suburb of Chicago. It was established in the 1850s and spans 20 acres. Community festivals, pick-up sporting events, and ceremonies are often held in Carpenter Park due to its size.

== Renovation ==
Carpenter Park is currently being renovated. The project started in April 2013, and has a $1 million budget. Many things were added and will be added, including new playground equipment and a gazebo. The mission of these renovations are "...to increase the attractiveness and diversity of the amenities in the parks system."
