= Dundee Township, Illinois =

Dundee Township
- Township
- Location in Kane County

- Kane County's location in Illinois
- Coordinates: 42°06′32″N 088°17′51″W
- Country: United States
- State: Illinois
- County: Kane

Area
  - Total: 35.89 sq mi (93.0 km^{2})
  - Land: 34.89 sq mi (90.4 km^{2})
  - Water: 1.00 sq mi (2.6 km^{2}) 2.79%
- Elevation: 817 ft (249 m)

Population (2020)
  - Total: 64,722
  - Density: 1,855/sq mi (716.2/km^{2})
- ZIP Codes: 60010, 60102, 60110, 60118, 60120, 60123, 60124, 60136
- FIPS code: 17-089-21046
- GNIS feature ID: 0428917

Dundee Township occupies the 6-mile (9.7 km) square in the Northeast corner of Kane County, Illinois. It includes West and East Dundee, Carpentersville, Sleepy Hollow, Gilberts and portions of Elgin, Barrington Hills, and Algonquin. It is divided by the Fox River.

As of the 2010 census, its population was 64,722 and it contained 22,699 housing units.

== History ==
Dundee Township is named after Dundee, New York, which in turn is named after the city in Scotland.

Historically, industry and residential areas straddled the river, with most of the land on the western half of the township devoted to agriculture. Today, the township has become predominantly a suburb of Chicago.

The township's history is documented by the Dundee Township Historical Society, and parts of Carpentersville and East and West Dundee are recognized as the Dundee Township Historic District. The Milk Pail Restaurant east of East Dundee is also considered a historic site.

== Geography ==
According to the 2021 census gazetteer files, Dundee Township has a total area of 35.89 square miles (92.95 km^{2}), of which 34.89 square miles (90.36 km^{2}) (or 97.21%) is land and 1.00 square mile (2.59 km^{2}) (or 2.79%) is water. It is located at 42.111813 N, 88.286978 W.

=== Cities, towns, villages ===
- Algonquin (partial)
- Barrington Hills (partial)
- Carpentersville (majority)
- East Dundee (majority)
- Elgin (partial)
- Gilberts (eastern edge)
- Sleepy Hollow
- West Dundee (majority)

A small portion of the village of Hoffman Estates was formerly in this township until it was de-annexed in 2022.

== Demographics ==
As of the 2020 census there were 64,722 people, 21,218 households, and 15,445 families residing in the township. The population density was 1,803.44 inhabitants per square mile (696.31/km^{2}). There were 22,699 housing units at an average density of 632.50 per square mile (244.21/km^{2}). The racial makeup of the township was 52.87% White, 4.72% African American, 1.66% Native American, 5.49% Asian, 0.04% Pacific Islander, 21.37% from other races, and 13.84% from two or more races. Hispanic or Latino of any race were 39.59% of the population.

There were 21,218 households, out of which 40.00% had children under the age of 18 living with them, 56.54% were married couples living together, 11.02% had a female householder with no spouse present, and 27.21% were non-families. 20.20% of all households were made up of individuals, and 7.70% had someone living alone who was 65 years of age or older. The average household size was 3.08 and the average family size was 3.64.

The township's age distribution consisted of 26.9% under the age of 18, 9.6% from 18 to 24, 25.1% from 25 to 44, 26.7% from 45 to 64, and 11.6% who were 65 years of age or older. The median age was 36.8 years. For every 100 females, there were 98.2 males. For every 100 females age 18 and over, there were 95.0 males.

The median income for a household in the township was $84,967, and the median income for a family was $93,231. Males had a median income of $49,034 versus $33,326 for females. The per capita income for the township was $35,341. About 7.0% of families and 9.1% of the population were below the poverty line, including 15.5% of those under age 18 and 4.7% of those age 65 or over.

Historical population
Census	Pop.	Note	%±
2000	53,207		—
2010	64,167		20.6%
2020	64,722		0.9%
U.S. Decennial Census

== Government ==
The township is governed by a four-person elected Board of Trustees. The Township also has an elected Assessor, Clerk, Highway Commissioner and Supervisor. The Township Office is located at 611 E. Main Street, Suite 201 East Dundee, IL.

In addition to the township government, two other entities serve an area that approximates the Township. The Dundee Township Park District administers 564 acres (2.28 km^{2}) of parks, two golf courses and two swimming pools. The Dundee Township Library District operates a library in East Dundee.
