= Spring Hill Mall =

Former shopping mall in West Dundee, Illinois

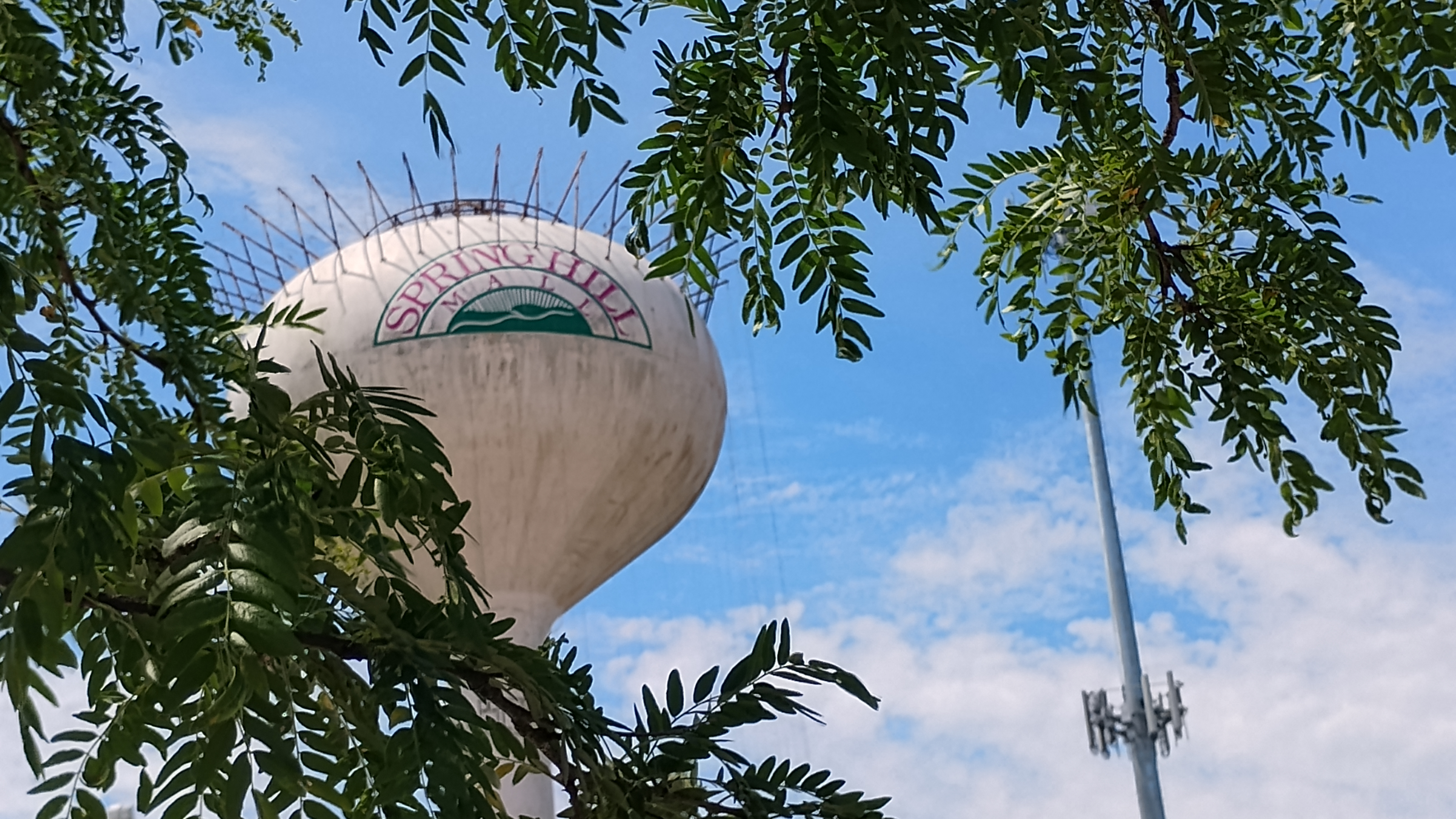
- Location: West Dundee, Illinois, United States
- Coordinates: 42°6′10″N 88°17′42″W
- Opened: October 1980
- Closed: March 22, 2024
- Demolished: May–November 2025
- Developer: Homart Development Company
- Manager: Village of West Dundee
- Owner: Village of West Dundee
- Architect: Architectonics Inc.
- Num. of anchor tenants: 0 (In original mall, Cinemark is now a standalone building)
- Floor area: 1,370,000 square feet (127,277.2 m^{2})
- Floors: 1 (2 in former Carson's, former Macy's, and former Sears)
- Public transit: Pace
- Website: www.springhillmall.com

Spring Hill Mall was a shopping mall in West Dundee, Illinois with a small portion in neighborning Carpentersville. Cinemark is the only anchor tenant of the mall still remaining. There are five vacant anchor stores that were once Carson Pirie Scott, Sears, Macy's, and Barnes & Noble, and Kohl's.

== History ==
The site was previously the D. Hill Nursery, which relocated to Union, Illinois to make way for the mall.

Spring Hill Mall was developed by Homart Development Company, then owned by Sears, Roebuck & Company. Architectonics Inc. of Chicago was the designer of the mall. The mall opened in October 1980 with two anchors, Marshall Field's and Sears. Originally, Carson Pirie Scott was scheduled to open an anchor store at the location now occupied by Kohl's (originally MainStreet), but this deal was canceled. The Carson's chain opened a Honey Bear Farm store in the west wing of the mall in October 1980. Carson Pirie Scott eventually opened a location at the mall in 1990 when former anchor Bergner's (which was added in 1981 as Bergner-Weise) was re-branded as Carson Pirie Scott. Bergner's parent company, P.A. Bergner & Co, acquired the Carson's chain in 1989 and elected to re-brand its Chicago-area Bergner's stores as Carson Pirie Scott. On April 18, 2018, it was announced that Carson's would be closing as the parent, Bon-Ton Stores, was going out of business. Carson's closed permanently on August 29, 2018.

The anchor location on the northwest side of the mall opened in 1984 as Joseph Spiess Company, an Elgin, Illinois-based specialty department store company. Joseph Spiess closed the Spring Hill Mall store in 1994. This location was later Wickes Furniture, Steve & Barry's (closed February 2009), Home Furniture Mart (opened 2011), American Eagle Furniture (opened 2013) and Darna Furniture. This location was vacated in 2015.

The anchor location at the west end of the mall opened in 1983 as JCPenney. On January 24, 2011, JCPenney announced that they would close this location by June 1, 2011.

A portion of the mall where current anchor Kohl's and former anchor Carson Pirie Scott & Co. (opened as Bergner-Weise) are located, and a portion of the inside mall immediately adjacent to the two anchor store locations are wholly within the village of Carpentersville whom to this day is responsible for providing police and fire safety services along with the issuance of all applicable permits, licenses and requests for zoning changes to those anchor and mall stores that are not within the village of West Dundee.

Red Lobster opened in the parking lot in May 1982. On August 28, 1989, Olive Garden opened in that area.

A Jewel-Osco store opened near the mall on January 30, 1992.

In 1994, Best Buy and Target Greatland opened across the street from the mall. Best Buy closed in 2012. Target Greatland closed on May 3, 2014 and was replaced by a sports complex.

A Denny's restaurant opened outside the mall in 1996.

In March 2004, Barnes & Noble opened in the Sears wing. A Home Depot store opened north of the mall later that year in December.

Today, the only remaining anchor store is Kohl's. The Marshall Field's store was rebranded as Macy's on September 9, 2006.

In 2011, General Growth Properties, following its bankruptcy, spun off 30 mall properties, including Spring Hill Mall, into Rouse Properties. Rouse Properties was acquired by Brookfield Properties Retail Group in 2016. General Growth (later GGP) was acquired by Brookfield Properties in 2018.

In 2012, LA Fitness opened outside the mall on the location of the former Toys "R" Us.

On February 20, 2015, the owner announced plans for a redevelopment of the mall. The first phase calls for the demolition of the west end of the mall, including the food court and former JCPenney and Darna Furniture locations, in order to make room for a new 37,000 sq ft. Cinemark movie theater that opened on December 15, 2016. Plans also call for an entertainment and dining pavilion and re-configuring the enclosed mall into an exterior shopping center.

On March 23, 2017, H&M opened at the mall.

On November 6, 2019, it was announced that Sears will be closing in February 2020. The closure of Sears left Macy's and Kohl's as the remaining anchors. The closure also left the mall with no original anchors from its 1980 opening. On January 7, 2020, it was announced that Macy's would be closing. This left the mall with Kohl's, Barnes & Noble and Cinemark as its only remaining anchors. On October 22, 2021, Barnes & Noble closed and relocated to nearby Algonquin Commons, leaving Kohl's and Cinemark as the malls only remaining anchors. Spring Hill Mall was sold to the Kohan Retail Investment Group in 2021.

On February 22, 2024, tenants were given eviction notices and were told to vacate the mall by no later than March 22, 2024, as the mall would be closing permanently on that date.

On March 22, 2024, Spring Hill Mall permanently closed its doors in hopes of being redeveloped.

On January 9, 2025, Kohl's announced will close its store in April as part of a plan to close 27 stores nationwide.

== Bus routes ==
Pace

- 552 North State/Spring Hill Mall
- 803 Carpentersville Local
