= Hampshire Township, Illinois =

Hampshire Township
- Township
- Location in Kane County

- Kane County's location in Illinois
- Coordinates: 42°06′29″N 088°31′50″W
- Country: United States
- State: Illinois
- County: Kane

Area
  - Total: 35.90 sq mi (93.0 km^{2})
  - Land: 35.87 sq mi (92.9 km^{2})
  - Water: 0.04 sq mi (0.10 km^{2}) 0.10%
- Elevation: 883 ft (269 m)

Population (2020)
  - Total: 9,023
  - Density: 251.5/sq mi (97.12/km^{2})
- FIPS code: 17-089-32538
- GNIS feature ID: 0429101
- Website: www.hampshiretownship.org

Hampshire Township is located in the northwest corner of Kane County, Illinois. As of the 2020 census, its population was 9,023 and it contained 3,516 housing units.

== Geography ==
According to the 2021 census gazetteer files, Hampshire Township has a total area of 35.90 square miles (92.98 km^{2}), of which 35.87 square miles (92.90 km^{2}) (or 99.90%) is land and 0.04 square miles (0.10 km^{2}) (or 0.10%) is water.

=== Cities, towns, villages ===
- Hampshire (vast majority)

=== Unincorporated towns ===
Allens Corners (at 42.0999036°N 88.4814296°W) is a landmark of the Allen family, the first settlers of Kane County in 1836. First known as blacksmiths and farmers, the towing business was started in 1937. The community is located at the intersection of U.S. Route 20 and Allen and Brier Hill roads.

=== Ghost town ===
- Henpeck at 42.1228023°N 88.4814748°W

== Demographics ==
As of the 2020 census there were 9,023 people, 2,975 households, and 2,298 families residing in the township. The population density was 251.32 inhabitants per square mile (97.04/km^{2}). There were 3,516 housing units at an average density of 97.93 per square mile (37.81/km^{2}). The racial makeup of the township was 83.76% White, 1.93% African American, 0.48% Native American, 1.71% Asian, 0.04% Pacific Islander, 4.19% from other races, and 7.89% from two or more races. Hispanic or Latino of any race were 12.35% of the population.

There were 2,975 households, out of which 20.90% had children under the age of 18 living with them, 58.66% were married couples living together, 9.34% had a female householder with no spouse present, and 22.76% were non-families. 17.30% of all households were made up of individuals, and 12.00% had someone living alone who was 65 years of age or older. The average household size was 2.77 and the average family size was 3.07.

The township's age distribution consisted of 15.4% under the age of 18, 10.7% from 18 to 24, 14.9% from 25 to 44, 33.7% from 45 to 64, and 25.3% who were 65 years of age or older. The median age was 50.2 years. For every 100 females, there were 94.8 males. For every 100 females age 18 and over, there were 102.4 males.

The median income for a household in the township was $87,169, and the median income for a family was $115,022. Males had a median income of $52,138 versus $32,771 for females. The per capita income for the township was $47,611. About 2.7% of families and 6.7% of the population were below the poverty line, including 0.0% of those under age 18 and 5.5% of those age 65 or over.

Historical population
Census	Pop.	Note	%±
2000	4,730		—
2010	7,569		60.0%
2020	9,023		19.2%
U.S. Decennial Census
