= Carpentersville, Illinois =

- Village
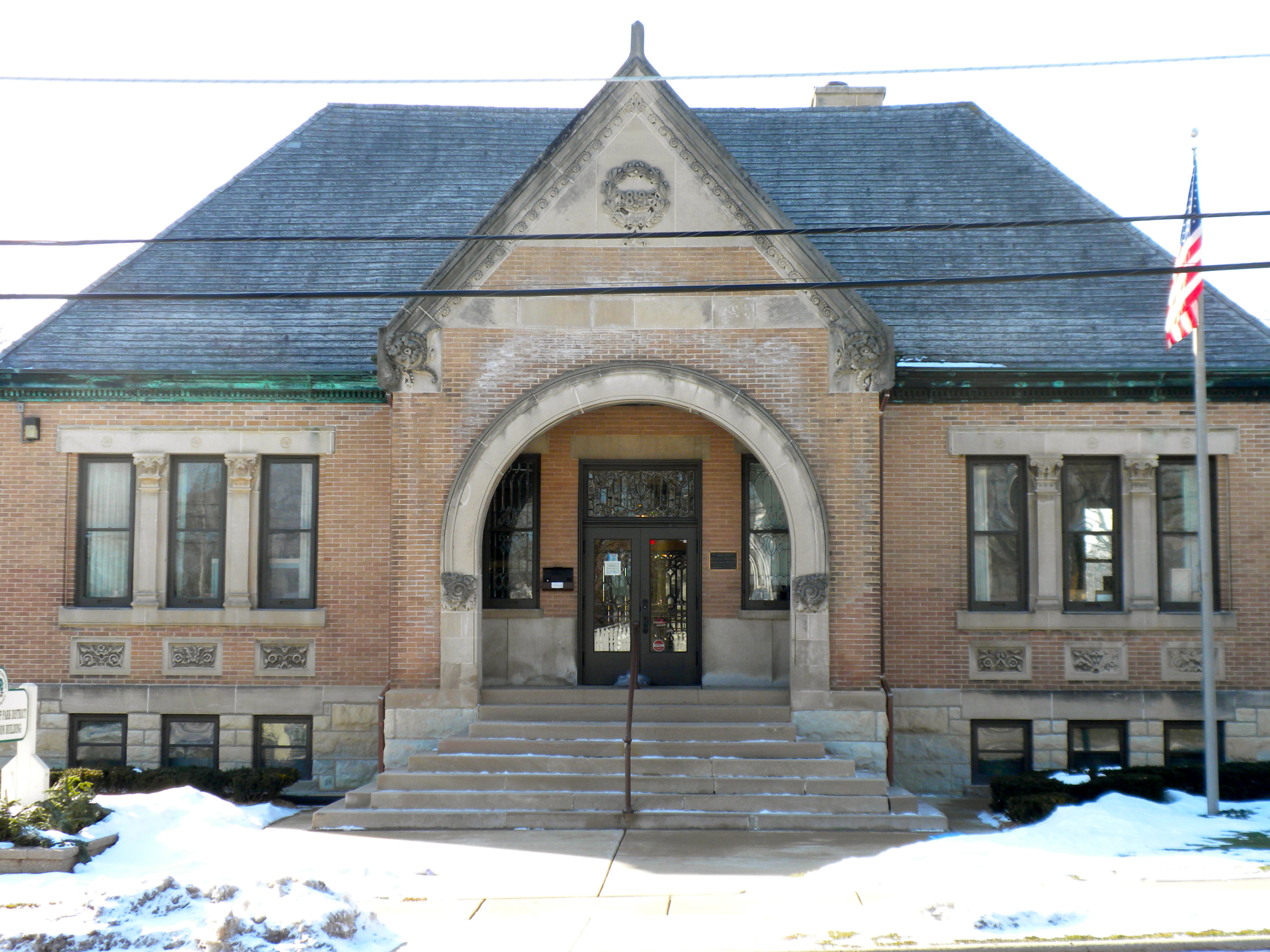
- Library Hall on Washington Street
- Motto: "Building a better tomorrow today"
- Location of Carpentersville in Kane County, Illinois.

- Location within Chicago metropolitan area Location within Illinois Location within the United States
- Coordinates: 42°7′16″N 88°16′29″W
- Country: United States
- State: Illinois
- County: Kane

Government
  - Mayor: John Skillman

Area
  - Total: 8.08 sq mi (20.93 km^{2})
  - Land: 7.87 sq mi (20.39 km^{2})
  - Water: 0.21 sq mi (0.54 km^{2})
- Elevation: 722 ft (220 m)

Population (2020)
  - Total: 37,983
  - Density: 4,824.7/sq mi (1,862.82/km^{2})
- Time zone: UTC−6 (CST)
  - Summer (DST): UTC−5 (CDT)
- ZIP Code(s): 60110
- Area codes: 847 and 224
- FIPS code: 17-11358
- GNIS feature ID: 2397560
- Website: www.cville.org

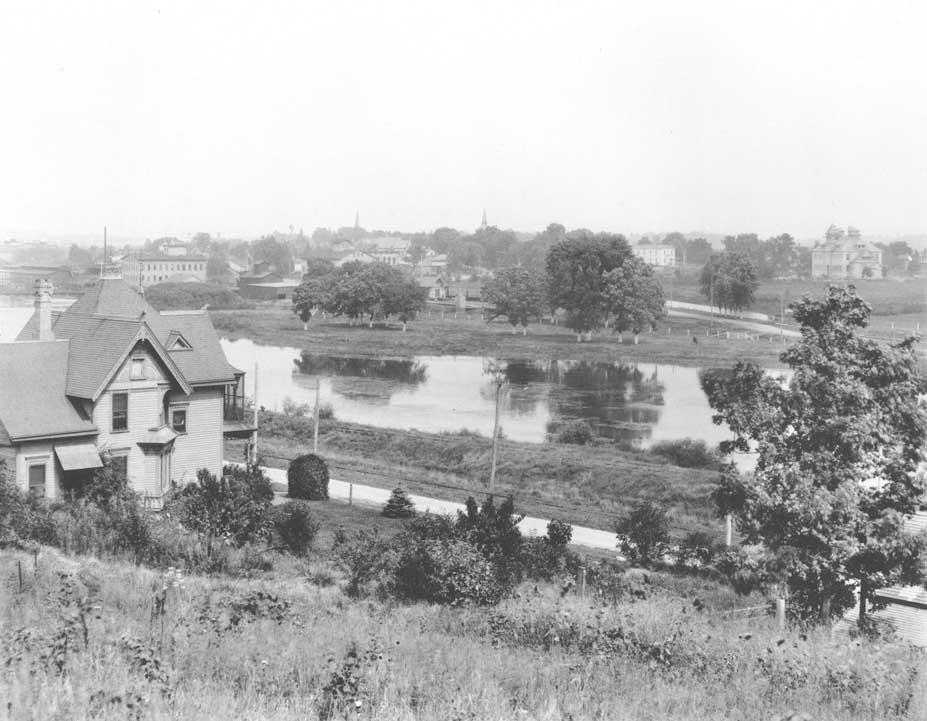
View of Carpentersville from the cemetery, 1898

Carpentersville is a village in Kane County, Illinois, United States. The population was 37,983 at the 2020 census. It is part of the Chicago metropolitan area.

== History ==
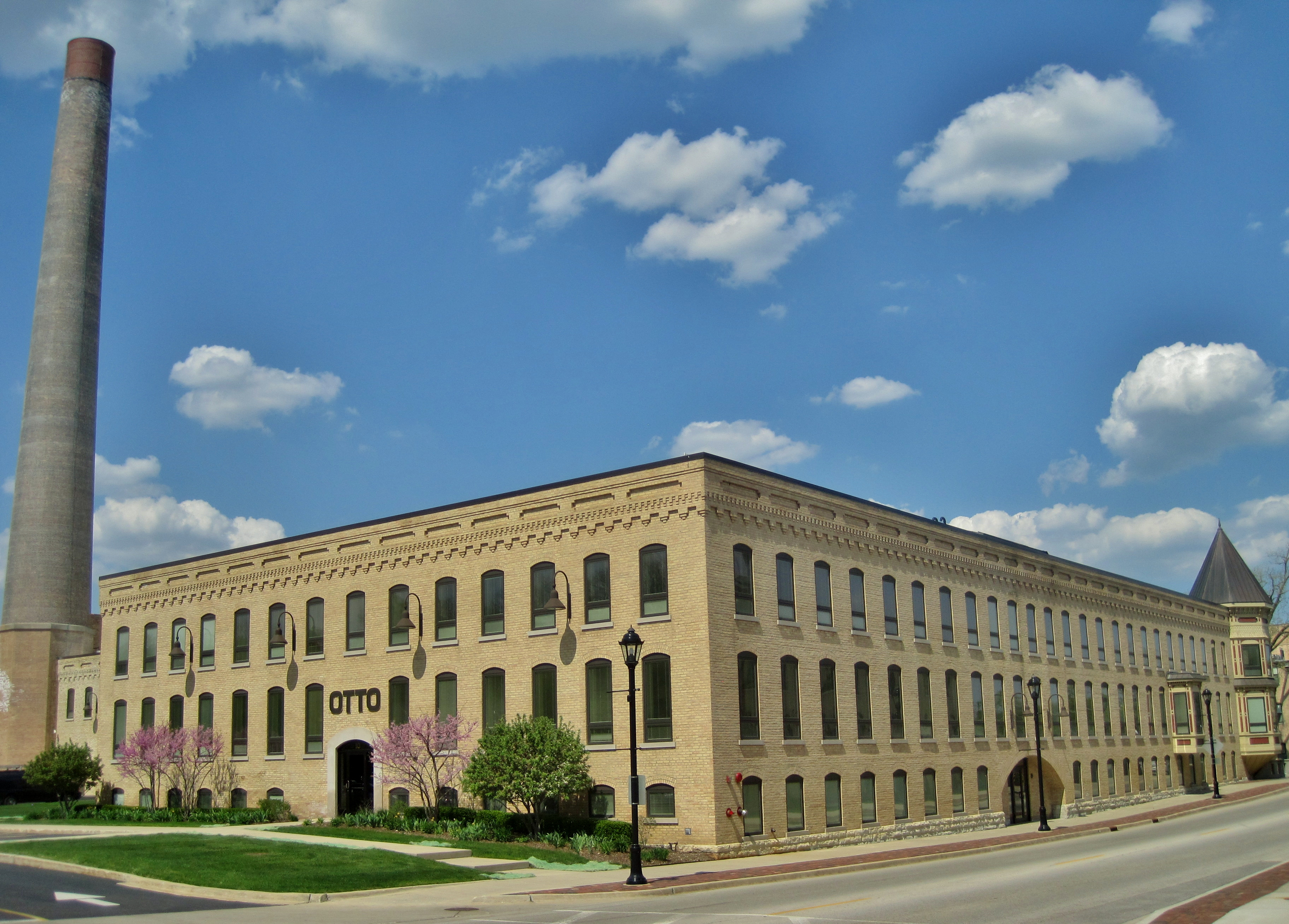
Illinois Iron and Bolt Company building on the Fox River.

Julius Angelo Carpenter (August 19, 1827 – March 30, 1880) was the founder of Carpentersville, Illinois and its first prominent citizen. Carpenter came with his family from Uxbridge, Massachusetts and settled near the Fox River, along with his father Charles Valentine Carpenter and his uncle Daniel. Angelo was the first person to settle Carpentersville. Carpenter built the settlement's first store, bridge, and factory. He served two consecutive terms in the Illinois House of Representatives. In 1837, the brothers, en route to the Rock River, made camp along the east bank of the Fox River to wait out the spring floods that made continuing their oxcart journey impossible. They ended up staying in the area to settle what was then called Carpenters' Grove.

For the next hundred years, Carpentersville did not grow as rapidly as other Fox River communities which had more direct rail connections to Chicago. The electric interurban railroad came to Carpentersville in 1896. The line was built by the Carpentersville, Elgin and Aurora Railway from a connection with the streetcar system in Elgin, Illinois and ran for four miles, terminating at the Illinois Iron and Bolt foundry on Main Street. This company changed ownership several times, including the Aurora, Elgin and Chicago Railway. It ended up being owned by the Aurora, Elgin and Fox River Electric Company in 1924. This line was always operated separately from the rest of the system, which included all traction lines between Carpentersville and Yorkville. This was a great convenience to factory workers who traveled to Elgin and for Elgin workers to come to Carpentersville. The line was used by everyone to enjoy Elgin's Trout Park and to enjoy the "summer cars" for a cool ride. The line started to fail with the onset of the Great Depression and the establishment and paving of Illinois Route 31, which encouraged automobile use and the creation of a bus route. The final blow came in 1933, when a tornado destroyed the bridge over the Fox River just south of West Dundee.

Until the 1950s, Carpentersville consisted of a street grid along the Fox River centered on Main Street, which was the only highway bridge across the Fox River between Algonquin and Dundee. The Meadowdale Shopping Center, which was anchored by Wieboldt's, Carson Pirie Scott, Cook's and W.T. Grant; it also featured an indoor ice skating rink, overshadowed the commercial district along the river. A large section of the shopping mall on the north side was torn down in the 1990s and a new post office building was built.

In 1956, to reflect this population shift, Dundee Community High School relocated from its former site on Illinois Route 31 to Cleveland Avenue (now Carpentersville Middle School). In 1964, a second high school, named for Irving Crown, opened on Kings Road on the northern edge of Meadowdale. The two schools have now merged. DeLacey (one of the schools built on Kings Road) was closed and demolished, and was remade on Cleveland Ave.

From 1958 to 1969, Carpentersville was home to the Meadowdale International Raceway, a 3.27 miles (5.26 km) long automobile race track located west of Illinois Route 31 which was also started by Besinger. The site is now a Township Park and County Forest Preserve.

In the 1990s and 2000s, Carpentersville began to expand is development further west along Randall Road with the construction of many new subdivisions and shopping centers.

== Geography ==
According to the 2021 census gazetteer files, Carpentersville has a total area of 8.09 square miles (20.95 km^{2}), of which 7.88 square miles (20.41 km^{2}) (or 97.43%) is land and 0.21 square miles (0.54 km^{2}) (or 2.57%) is water.

=== Surrounding areas ===
Algonquin / Unincorporated Dundee Township
Unincorporated Rutland Township Barrington Hills
Gilberts Barrington Hills
West Dundee East Dundee
West Dundee

== Demographics ==
Historical population
Census	Pop.	Note	%±
1880	348		—
1890	754		116.7%
1900	1,002		32.9%
1910	1,128		12.6%
1920	1,036		−8.2%
1930	1,461		41.0%
1940	1,289		−11.8%
1950	1,523		18.2%
1960	17,424		1,044.1%
1970	24,059		38.1%
1980	23,272		−3.3%
1990	23,049		−1.0%
2000	30,586		32.7%
2010	37,691		23.2%
2020	37,983		0.8%
U.S. Decennial Census; 2000 2010 2020

=== Racial and ethnic composition ===
Carpentersville, Illinois – Racial and ethnic composition Note: the US Census treats Hispanic/Latino as an ethnic category. This table excludes Latinos from the racial categories and assigns them to a separate category. Hispanics/Latinos may be of any race.
Race / Ethnicity (NH = Non-Hispanic)	Pop 2000	Pop 2010	Pop 2020	% 2000	% 2010	% 2020
White alone (NH)	15,862	13,810	11,477	51.86%	36.64%	30.22%
Black or African American alone (NH)	1,234	2,399	2,152	4.03%	6.36%	5.67%
Native American or Alaska Native alone (NH)	83	42	40	0.27%	0.11%	0.11%
Asian alone (NH)	568	2,022	1,971	1.86%	5.36%	5.19%
Pacific Islander alone (NH)	6	0	3	0.02%	0.00%	0.01%
Other race alone (NH)	27	52	126	0.09%	0.14%	0.33%
Mixed race or Multiracial (NH)	396	489	843	1.29%	1.30%	2.22%
Hispanic or Latino (any race)	12,410	18,877	21,371	40.57%	50.08%	56.26%
Total	30,586	37,691	37,983	100.00%	100.00%	100.00%

=== 2020 census ===
As of the 2020 census, Carpentersville had a population of 37,983. The median age was 32.5 years. 29.6% of residents were under the age of 18 and 7.9% of residents were 65 years of age or older. For every 100 females there were 100.1 males, and for every 100 females age 18 and over there were 99.2 males age 18 and over.

The population density was 4,694.48 inhabitants per square mile (1,812.55/km^{2}). 100.0% of residents lived in urban areas, while 0.0% lived in rural areas.

There were 11,439 households in Carpentersville, of which 47.8% had children under the age of 18 living in them. Of all households, 53.8% were married-couple households, 15.2% were households with a male householder and no spouse or partner present, and 22.6% were households with a female householder and no spouse or partner present. About 16.0% of all households were made up of individuals and 4.8% had someone living alone who was 65 years of age or older.

There were 11,777 housing units, of which 2.9% were vacant. The homeowner vacancy rate was 0.9% and the rental vacancy rate was 5.0%.

=== Income and poverty ===
The median income for a household in the village was $73,105, and the median income for a family was $79,102. Males had a median income of $41,666 versus $29,361 for females. The per capita income for the village was $26,770. About 10.2% of families and 12.0% of the population were below the poverty line, including 20.7% of those under age 18 and 5.8% of those age 65 or over.

=== Latino population ===
Carpentersville underwent a rapid transition from majority white to majority Hispanic. In 1990, the census showed a Hispanic population of 17% which increased to 40.6% in 2000, 50.1% in 2010, and 56.3% in 2020.

In 2007, the Village of Carpentersville passed an ordinance making English the official language of the village requiring that all government meetings and notices be conducted or written in English only; the bill was introduced by village board trustee members, Judy Sigwalt and Paul Humpfer. Despite protests outside of village hall by the Hispanic community, the ordinance passed 5–2.

Nearby communities (Algonquin, Huntley, Lake in the Hills, Gilberts, Sleepy Hollow, West Dundee, East Dundee, Pingree Grove) have also seen an increase to their Latino population, although at a more gradual pace, resulting in more integrated communities.

== Governance ==
Carpentersville operates under the council-manager form of government in which an elected Board, consisting of the President (chief elected official) and six Trustees, appoints a professional manager to oversee the day-to-day operation of government services and programs. The council-manager form of government combines the leadership of elected officials with the experience of a professional manager.

== Local school districts ==
- Community Unit School District 300 including Dundee-Crown High School and Carpentersville Middle School.
- Barrington Community Unit School District 220

== Notable places ==
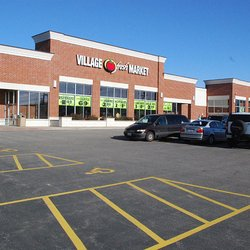
Village Fresh Market replaced a Jewel Osco and caters Mexican grocery goods to the Hispanic population and others in the community.

- Carpenter Park
- Carpentersville Dam
- Raceway Woods Forest Preserve

== Meadowdale Shopping Center ==
Meadowdale Shopping Center
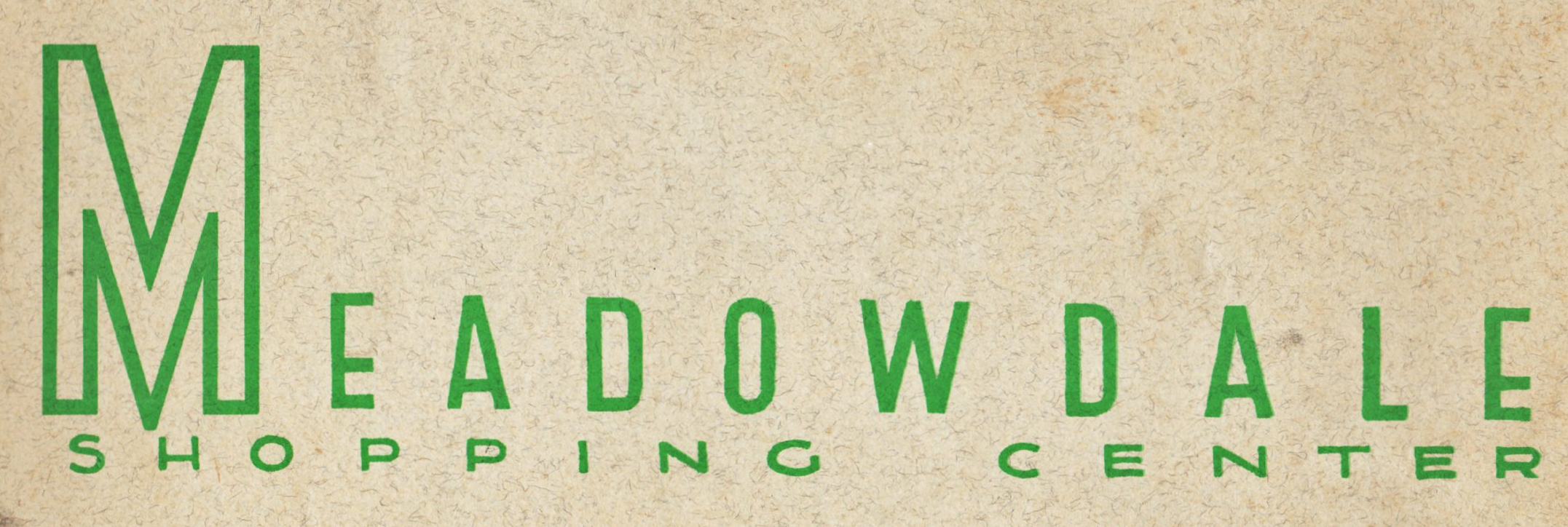
- Location: Carpentersville, Illinois
- Address: 100 W Mall Dr
- Opened: May 18, 1957
- Developer: Leonard W. Besinger & Associates
- Architect: Leonard W. Besinger Jr., Earl Rosin, William F. Copeland, Raymond D. Larsen
- Num. of stores: 17 (56 originally)
- Num. of anchor tenants: 2 (5 originally)
- Floor area: About 314,000 sq ft incl. Walmart (600,000 sq ft originally)
- Floors: 1
- Parking: 1,165

Meadowdale Shopping Center opened in 1957 and grew to as many as 53 stores by 1958. Over time the number of tenants has gone down; current tenants include Walmart, Tractor Supply Company and a large post office.

In 1952, the Village of Carpentersville proposed a plan for an enclosed shopping center amid residential areas.

On November 1, 1954, Leonard W. Besinger started construction planning on the mall which would become one of the largest shopping center developments in the United States at that time, and in December 1955, ground was broken for the $10,000,000 development. On May 18, 1957, the grand opening of the first 14 stores in the shopping center was held. In October 1957 construction was underway for 40 additional stores. The first of these stores to open was the Grant's department store on October 17, 1957, followed by R&S and Richman Bros.

On November 20–22, 1958, the shopping center held the grand opening of its Winter Garden Annex, an enclosed area centered on an 6,000 sq ft (557 m^{2}) ice rink which featured a 37,500 sq ft (3,484 m^{2}) Block & Kuhl department store, (later bought by, and renamed, Carson Pirie Scott), the Winter Garden restaurant, St. Mauritz cocktail bar, snack bar, and other stores. The opening festivities included fashion shows on the ice rink, pony and other kiddie rides, and children's theater performances.

By this time the center's tenants included an appliance repair store, an appliance store, the Charles bakery, barber shops, beauty salons, Cole's camera shop, the McMullens "children's department store", Urban Cleaners, the St. Mauritz cocktail bar, Mrs. Stevens' candy shop, a currency exchange, the Block & Kuhl department store, women's apparel shops including Eleanor, Lorraine Anne, Rorry's and My Shop, the Chicago Furniture Mart, a gift & card shop, the Western Hardware & Supply hardware store, a hobby shop, the ice skating rink and Michael Kirby ice skating school, Jacob's Jewelers, a liquor store, a medical center, a photo studio, a post office, a radio station, restaurants including the Winter Garden and Kings & Queens, Frank's shoe repair shop, shoe stores, a sporting goods store, a Piggly Wiggly supermarket, a travel agency, and a variety store.

In November 1959, Wieboldt's held the grand opening of their 150,000 sq ft (14,000 m^{2}) Meadowdale store.

On October 25, 1960, President John F. Kennedy gave a speech about his presidential election campaign. He talked about fair education for young children and housing.

On November 19, 1963, a fire destroyed the mall area causing $3,000,000 worth of damages, destroyed 25 stores and the ice rink in the Wintergarden Arcade. Rebuilding began immediately and one year later the mall re-opened on November 5, 1964. However, the ice rink did not return, and in 1965, Carson Pirie Scott was converted into a Clark's discount department store, then again to Cooks in May 1971. The shopping center continued on through the 1970s with roughly the same number of tenants, counting 56 stores and services in 1979.

In the 1980s, the mall experienced decline. In October 1980 a competing mall, Spring Hill Mall opened 2.5 mi (4 km) to the west. Spring Hill Mall had stronger anchor stores Sears and Marshall Field's.

In 1989, the north end of the mall and half of the east end - 200,000 sq ft (19,000 m^{2}) in total - were demolished, according to mall management "in order to build to suit future tenants". The Post Office was doubled in size.

In 1990, there were only 28 tenants. Besides the post office, these included apparel, food, drug, video, electronics, shoe, wine and liquor, and hardware stores; cinemas; a print shop, beauty salon, barber shop, cleaners, bakery, Domino's pizza, Chinese restaurant, hair salon, bowling alley, insurance and travel agencies and a laundromat.

The mall now has fewer than two dozen tenants, housed in the strip mall portion. In 2016, a 183,000 sq ft (17,000 m^{2}) Walmart opened on an out-parcel at the east end of the mall.

== Transportation ==
Pace provides bus service on multiple routes connecting Carpentersville to Crystal Lake, Elgin, and other destinations. The Chicago & North Western had a Line between Elgin and Crystal Lake. It served Carpentersville from 1904 to 1932.

== Notable residents ==
- Sparky Adams, professional basketball player
- Julius Angelo Carpenter, town founder
- Gia Gunn, drag queen
- Kenneth Hawkinson, president of Kutztown University of Pennsylvania
- Jordan Hill, criminal and co-perpetrator of the 2017 Chicago torture incident
- Mark Kellar, professional football running back
- Loren Strickland, professional football safety
- Bradie Tennell, winner of the 2015 U.S. Figure Skating Championships and 2018 U.S. Figure Skating Championships ladies competition.

== See also ==
- Dundee Township Historic District
