= 2017 Chicago torture incident =

Livestreamed torture incident

- Location: Chicago, Illinois
- Date: January 3, 2017; 9 years ago
- Attack type: Torture, kidnapping, stabbing, beating, hate crime
- Weapon: Knife
- Victim: Unnamed white male
- Perpetrators: Jordan Hill; Tesfaye Cooper; Brittany Covington; Tanishia Covington
- Motive: Racism, ableism, ransom
- Verdict: Pleaded guilty
- Convictions: Brittany and Tanisha Covington: Hate crime; Intimidation; Aggravated battery; Hill and Cooper: Hate crime; Aggravated kidnapping
- Sentence: Hill: 8 years in prison Cooper: 7 years in prison Tanishia: 3 years in prison Brittany: 4 years probation and 200 hours of community service

In January 2017, four black perpetrators: Jordan Hill, Tesfaye "Teefies" Cooper, and Brittany and Tanishia Covington tortured, committed a hate crime and other offenses against a mentally disabled white man in Chicago, Illinois. The attackers, two men and two women, laughed as they kidnapped and physically, verbally, and racially abused the teenaged victim. The incident was livestreamed on Facebook.

The victim met with an acquaintance from high school at a McDonald's on New Year's Eve, and on January 3 was found by a police officer to appear to be suffering from numerous injuries while being led by one of the perpetrators on a sidewalk. The four perpetrators were arrested after the incident was livestreamed by one of them on Facebook Live, and were all given plea deals for hate crime charges and other offenses. The sentences ranged from probation to 8 years in prison.

== Kidnapping and torture ==
On December 31, 2016, the victim, an 18-year-old white mentally-disabled male, was dropped off by his parents at a McDonald's in suburban Streamwood, Illinois, where the victim wanted to meet Jordan Hill, one of the perpetrators. The victim knew Hill before the incident, as the two had attended the same school in Aurora, Illinois, and considered him a friend. On January 2, 2017, the victim's parents filed a report that he was missing.

According to police reports, Hill had stolen a van, which he passed off as his own when he picked up the victim on December 31. Hill had the victim sleep in the van while he spent three nights visiting friends on the West Side of Chicago. On January 3, Hill and Tesfaye Cooper drove the victim to the apartment of sisters Brittany and Tanishia Covington, where the four tied up and tortured the victim for hours.

Brittany, the younger of the two Covington sisters, began a Facebook Live stream, broadcasting the attackers laughing as they bound, gagged, beat, and taunted the victim, cut out part of his scalp with a knife, made him kiss the floor, and forced him to drink from a toilet. They screamed "Fuck white people" and forced the victim to repeat them in shouting "Fuck Trump". One of the perpetrators contacted the victim's mother and demanded a $300 ransom for the victim's return. The Facebook Live stream captured only 28 minutes of what was an hours-long attack. Police suspected that the perpetrators stopped and left the apartment when downstairs neighbors complained about noise levels.

On January 3, at approximately 5:15 p.m., Harrison District Officer Michael Donnelly saw the victim walking with the perpetrator Hill. The victim was observed by Officer Donnelly to be wearing summer clothing during winter conditions. Police said the victim appeared "injured" and "confused". Donnelly later stated, "I observed him wearing a tank top, inside-out, backwards, jean shorts and sandals on...He was bloodied. He was battered. He was very discombobulated." Running the victim's name through police databases, Officer Donnelly discovered that the victim was reported as a missing person and brought him to the hospital.

== Perpetrators and legal proceedings ==
Four perpetrators were arrested and charged with aggravated kidnapping, aggravated unlawful restraint, aggravated battery, and hate crime: Jordan Hill and Tesfaye Cooper, two 18-year-old males, as well as sisters Brittany Covington (18 years old) and Tanishia Covington (24 years old).

On February 10, 2017, all four perpetrators pleaded not guilty at their arraignment. On May 16, 2017, a judge set bail for the four individuals: $900,000 for Hill; $800,000 for Cooper; $500,000 for Brittany Covington; and $200,000 for Tanishia Covington. None of the four defendants were able to post bail.

On December 8, 2017, Brittany Covington pleaded guilty to the charges of committing a hate crime, intimidation and aggravated battery. Additional charges, such as kidnapping, were dropped as part of her plea deal. Covington was sentenced to four years of probation and 200 hours of community service. Cook County Circuit Judge William Hooks said that he could have sentenced her to prison, but stated "I'm not sure if I did that you'd be coming out any better."

On April 19, 2018, Tanishia Covington pleaded guilty to the charges of committing a hate crime, intimidation and aggravated battery and was sentenced to three years in prison.

On July 5, 2018, Jordan Hill pleaded guilty to the charges of aggravated kidnapping and committing a hate crime and was sentenced to eight years in prison.

On July 12, 2018, Tesfaye Cooper pleaded guilty to a hate crime and aggravated kidnapping. Cooper was sentenced to seven years in prison.

== Misleading news coverage ==
In January 2017, after the events took place, CBS Radio News reported, "The viral video of a beating and knife attack in Chicago suggests the assault had racial overtones. CBS's Dean Reynolds tells us the victim is described as a mentally challenged teenager. In the video he is choked and repeatedly called the n-word. His clothes are slashed and he is terrorized with a knife. His alleged captors repeatedly reference Donald Trump." This description, which implied that a black victim was tortured by white Trump supporters, was criticized by conservatives, including Jack Armstrong and Joe Getty at the San Francisco CBS Radio News affiliate KCBS (AM).

== Aftermath and reactions ==
The live stream was later deleted, but archives still exist. There was widespread outrage over the beating. In its aftermath, the hashtag #BLMKidnapping was trending on Twitter, implying a connection with the Black Lives Matter (BLM) movement. None of the attackers specifically mentioned Black Lives Matter in the video and the police found there to be no connection. Representatives for Black Lives Matter's Chicago branch denounced the beating and stated that they were uninvolved, and police stated that they found no evidence that Black Lives Matter was the motive of the incident. Some media pundits, such as Glenn Beck, suggested that the rhetoric of Black Lives Matter and its supporters had encouraged the attackers, while other commentators disputed this claim.

President Barack Obama released a statement condemning the incident, saying, "What we have seen as surfacing, I think, are a lot of problems that have been there a long time... Whether it's tensions between police and communities, (or) hate crimes of the despicable sort that has just now recently surfaced on Facebook." Chicago Mayor Rahm Emanuel said, "Anyone who has seen it [finds the video] both sickening and sickened by it," while Illinois Governor Bruce Rauner and his wife Diana said that they were "deeply saddened and disturbed by the horrific violence" depicted in the live stream.
