= Cost of operation =

The cost of operation refers to the total expenses incurred in running a company or a specific business activity in its normal operations. It includes both fixed costs, such as rent, salaries, and insurance, and variable costs, such as raw materials, utilities, and production expenses.

== See also ==
- Operating cost
- Operations management
- Loss leader
