= Gilberts, Illinois =

- Village
- Location of Gilberts in Kane County, Illinois.

- Location of Illinois in the United States
- Coordinates: 42°07′35″N 88°22′17″W
- Country: United States
- State: Illinois
- County: Kane
- Townships: Rutland, Dundee
- Established: 1890

Government
  - Village President: Guy Zambetti

Area
  - Total: 5.49 sq mi (14.22 km^{2})
  - Land: 5.49 sq mi (14.22 km^{2})
  - Water: 0 sq mi (0.00 km^{2})
- Elevation: 899 ft (274 m)

Population (2020)
  - Total: 8,366
  - Density: 1,524.1/sq mi (588.44/km^{2})
- Time zone: UTC-6 (CST)
  - Summer (DST): UTC-5 (CDT)
- ZIP Code(s): 60136
- Area codes: 847 and 224
- FIPS code: 17-29171
- GNIS feature ID: 2398961
- Website: villageofgilberts.com

Gilberts is a village in Kane County, Illinois, United States. The population was 8,366 at the 2020 census.

== History ==
The beginnings of recorded human settlement in the area of Gilberts was recorded in the War of 1812, when General Scott began waging war against the native American tribes that inhabited the area, including the Blackhawks, Algonquin, and Potawatomi. Beginning in the 1820s, European settlement in the region began. In 1840, the Potawatomi sold their land and moved westwards, making the entire area now inhabited by European settlers. In 1852, Gilberts Station opened on the Galena & Chicago Union line to Freeport, named after the Gilberts, the largest landowners in the area. Specifically, Albro Gilbert, a pioneer who was a part of the Gilberts family. In 1855, the Gilberts sold their land to Elijah Wilcox.

Opening in 1907, the Elgin and Belvidere Electric Company opened the "Elgin and Belvidere Electric Railway", connecting Elgin, Illinois to Belvidere, Illinois, with a stop at Gilberts. During the Great Depression, many businesses in the area went bankrupt, including the Elgin and Belvidere Electric Company in 1930. In 1930, Route 72 also opened up, connecting Gilberts to the outside world.

In 1988, George Bush visited the town during his election campaign.

== Geography ==
Gilberts is located in northern Kane County. Most of the village is in Rutland Township, with a small portion crossing to the east into Dundee Township. The village limits extend north to the McHenry County line. Gilberts is bordered to the east by the village of West Dundee and the city of Elgin. It is bordered to the west by the village of Pingree Grove. It is also bordered to the northwest by the village of Huntley

According to the 2021 census gazetteer files, Gilberts has a total area of 5.49 square miles (14.22 km^{2}), of which 5.49 square miles (14.22 km^{2}) (or 99.96%) is land and 0.00 square miles (0.00 km^{2}) (or 0.04%) is water.

== Demographics ==
Historical population
| Census | Pop. | Note | %± |
|---|---|---|---|
| 1900 | 222 | | — |
| 1910 | 268 | | 20.7% |
| 1920 | 152 | | −43.3% |
| 1930 | 130 | | −14.5% |
| 1940 | 170 | | 30.8% |
| 1950 | 183 | | 7.6% |
| 1960 | 238 | | 30.1% |
| 1970 | 336 | | 41.2% |
| 1980 | 405 | | 20.5% |
| 1990 | 987 | | 143.7% |
| 2000 | 1,279 | | 29.6% |
| 2010 | 6,879 | | 437.8% |
| 2020 | 8,366 | | 21.6% |
U.S. Decennial Census; 2010 2020

=== Racial and ethnic composition ===
Gilberts village, Illinois – Racial and ethnic composition Note: the US Census treats Hispanic/Latino as an ethnic category. This table excludes Latinos from the racial categories and assigns them to a separate category. Hispanics/Latinos may be of any race.
| Race / Ethnicity (NH = Non-Hispanic) | Pop 2000 | Pop 2010 | Pop 2020 | % 2000 | % 2010 | % 2020 |
|---|---|---|---|---|---|---|
| White alone (NH) | 1,204 | 4,756 | 5,284 | 94.14% | 69.14% | 63.16% |
| Black or African American alone (NH) | 2 | 129 | 257 | 0.16% | 1.88% | 3.07% |
| Native American or Alaska Native alone (NH) | 3 | 5 | 4 | 0.23% | 0.07% | 0.05% |
| Asian alone (NH) | 21 | 959 | 1,065 | 1.64% | 13.94% | 12.73% |
| Native Hawaiian or Pacific Islander alone (NH) | 0 | 4 | 1 | 0.00% | 0.06% | 0.01% |
| Other race alone (NH) | 0 | 19 | 33 | 0.00% | 0.28% | 0.39% |
| Mixed race or Multiracial (NH) | 6 | 133 | 310 | 0.47% | 1.93% | 3.71% |
| Hispanic or Latino (any race) | 43 | 874 | 1,412 | 3.36% | 12.71% | 16.88% |
| Total | 1,279 | 6,879 | 8,366 | 100.00% | 100.00% | 100.00% |

=== 2020 census ===
As of the 2020 census, Gilberts had a population of 8,366. The median age was 36.5 years. 29.3% of residents were under the age of 18 and 7.9% of residents were 65 years of age or older. For every 100 females there were 100.2 males, and for every 100 females age 18 and over there were 97.9 males age 18 and over.

98.3% of residents lived in urban areas, while 1.7% lived in rural areas.

There were 2,668 households in Gilberts, of which 49.4% had children under the age of 18 living in them. Of all households, 69.2% were married-couple households, 10.5% were households with a male householder and no spouse or partner present, and 14.1% were households with a female householder and no spouse or partner present. About 12.7% of all households were made up of individuals and 3.8% had someone living alone who was 65 years of age or older.

There were 2,699 housing units, of which 1.1% were vacant. The homeowner vacancy rate was 0.5% and the rental vacancy rate was 2.8%. The population density was 1,523.58 inhabitants per square mile (588.26/km^{2}), and there were 2,240 families residing in the village.

=== Income and poverty ===
The median income for a household in the village was $96,420, and the median income for a family was $94,967. Males had a median income of $75,547 versus $46,797 for females. The per capita income for the village was $37,136. About 0.0% of families and 1.9% of the population were below the poverty line, including 0.0% of those under age 18 and 0.0% of those age 65 or over.

== Education ==
Gilberts is located in Community Unit School District 300. Children who reside in Gilberts attend Hampshire High School.

Gilberts Elementary School Is an elementary school for grades K-5. The school used to have a pre-k or preschool program. Hampshire Middle School and Dundee Middle School are the Middle schools that feed into Hampshire High School. Cambridge Lakes Charter School is also an option for residents in district.

== Parks and recreation ==
Town Center Park

This is the new, large park that is now open. A parking lot is being installed which will accommodate over 80 vehicles.

The park is a 20-acre (81,000 m^{2}) space and will be home to many sports teams such as the YMCA's baseball and soccer teams.

Town Square Park

This centrally located park is near Lake Gilberts and features a new gazebo.

Memorial Park

Memorial Park offers the following amenities: baseball diamond, soccer field, playground, fishing pond, picnic pavilion, and a basketball court. It used to have a small skate park.

Waitcus Park

Waitcus Park features a baseball diamond, basketball court (1/2 court), playground, fishing pond and a picnic pavilion.

Sports

Gilberts is the home to the GPH Grizzlies Football Team that plays in the TCYFL. It has two Super Bowl runner-ups and two championships. The team was founded in 2008 and has 3 separate sides, Bantams, Feather, and Middleweights.
