= Sleepy Hollow, Illinois =

- Village
- Motto: "In the Heart of the Beautiful Fox River Valley"
- Location of Sleepy Hollow in Kane County, Illinois

- Location of Illinois in the United States
- Coordinates: 42°05′29″N 88°18′50″W
- Country: United States
- State: Illinois
- County: Kane
- Township: Dundee

Area
  - Total: 2.04 sq mi (5.29 km^{2})
  - Land: 2.02 sq mi (5.23 km^{2})
  - Water: 0.023 sq mi (0.06 km^{2})
- Elevation: 745 ft (227 m)

Population (2020)
  - Total: 3,214
  - Density: 1,591.8/sq mi (614.61/km^{2})
- Time zone: UTC-6 (CST)
  - Summer (DST): UTC-5 (CDT)
- ZIP code: 60118
- Area code(s): 847 & 224
- FIPS code: 17-70161
- GNIS feature ID: 2399828
- Wikimedia Commons: Sleepy Hollow, Illinois
- Website: www.sleepyhollowil.org

Sleepy Hollow is a village in Kane County, Illinois, United States. The population was 3,214 at the 2020 census.

== Geography ==
Sleepy Hollow is located in northeastern Kane County. It is bordered to the north and east by the village of West Dundee and to the south and west by the city of Elgin.

According to the 2021 census gazetteer files, Sleepy Hollow has a total area of 2.04 square miles (5.28 km^{2}), of which 2.02 square miles (5.23 km^{2}) (or 98.92%) is land and 0.02 square miles (0.05 km^{2}) (or 1.08%) is water.

Sleepy Hollow is generally bounded by Randall Road to the west and Illinois Route 72 to the north. Illinois Route 31 runs east of the village limits, and Interstate 90 passes to the south.

== Demographics ==
Historical population
Census	Pop.	Note	%±
1960	311		—
1970	1,729		455.9%
1980	2,000		15.7%
1990	3,241		62.1%
2000	3,553		9.6%
2010	3,304		−7.0%
2020	3,214		−2.7%
U.S. Decennial Census; 2010 2020

=== Racial and ethnic composition ===
Sleepy Hollow village, Illinois – Racial and ethnic composition Note: the US Census treats Hispanic/Latino as an ethnic category. This table excludes Latinos from the racial categories and assigns them to a separate category. Hispanics/Latinos may be of any race.
Race / Ethnicity (NH = Non-Hispanic)	Pop 2000	Pop 2010	Pop 2020	% 2000	% 2010	% 2020
White alone (NH)	3,252	2,949	2,603	91.53%	89.26%	80.99%
Black or African American alone (NH)	22	51	52	0.62%	1.54%	1.62%
Native American or Alaska Native alone (NH)	0	2	1	0.00%	0.06%	0.03%
Asian alone (NH)	77	58	72	2.17%	1.76%	2.24%
Native Hawaiian or Pacific Islander alone (NH)	1	1	0	0.03%	0.03%	0.00%
Other race alone (NH)	0	3	9	0.00%	0.09%	0.28%
Mixed race or Multiracial (NH)	67	33	89	1.89%	1.00%	2.77%
Hispanic or Latino (any race)	134	207	388	3.77%	6.27%	12.07%
Total	3,553	3,304	3,214	100.00%	100.00%	100.00%

=== 2020 census ===
As of the 2020 census, Sleepy Hollow had a population of 3,214. The median age was 49.1 years. 17.7% of residents were under the age of 18 and 20.8% were 65 years of age or older. For every 100 females, there were 99.4 males, and for every 100 females age 18 and over, there were 99.1 males age 18 and over.

100.0% of residents lived in urban areas, while 0.0% lived in rural areas.

There were 1,213 households in Sleepy Hollow, of which 25.8% had children under the age of 18 living in them. Of all households, 68.2% were married-couple households, 11.6% were households with a male householder and no spouse or partner present, and 15.2% were households with a female householder and no spouse or partner present. About 17.2% of all households were made up of individuals and 9.2% had someone living alone who was 65 years of age or older.

The population density was 1,574.72 inhabitants per square mile (608.00/km^{2}). There were 1,250 housing units at an average density of 612.44 per square mile (236.46/km^{2}). Of all housing units, 3.0% were vacant. The homeowner vacancy rate was 0.5% and the rental vacancy rate was 6.6%.

=== Income and poverty ===
The median income for a household in the village was $122,121, and the median income for a family was $137,981. Males had a median income of $74,500 versus $40,595 for females. The per capita income for the village was $50,022. About 2.3% of families and 2.3% of the population were below the poverty line, including 2.4% of those under age 18 and 3.6% of those age 65 or over.

== History ==
The village is on the site of Sleepy Hollow Farm, which was owned by the late J. H. McNabb, board chairman of Bell and Howell Company. McNabb's heirs sold the farm to Mr. and Mrs. Jack Polivka, who sold it in turn to Floyd T. Falese in 1953. Falese retained the services of a prominent planner and landscape architect, Raymond W. Hazekamp, who laid out a pattern of meandering roads, without curbs or sidewalks, that wound into curvilinear cul-de-sacs, avoiding the destruction of a single tree. This design retained the rural charm and natural contours of the farm and avoided taking down any existing trees.

Falese developed lakes in Sleepy Hollow from existing springs and stocked them with fish. Lake Paula and Lake Sharon were the first ones completed, with Lake Ichabod dug in 1962. Falese created Lake Legend and Lake Jacqueline in 1967. The village now owns and maintains several of the lakes. Early residents of the village could keep horses on their property, with outlots used as bridle paths.

The designs were carefully selected to enhance what Falese called "the Sleepy Hollow concept of good living". Falese encouraged multiple builders and custom-built homes within the community. In the 1960s many of the homes were prefabricated Scholz Design Homes constructed by the Mark 60 Corporation.

Falese marketed lots in the unincorporated subdivision called "Sleepy Hollow Manor". In 1958, the residents voted to incorporate Sleepy Hollow as a separate village rather than being annexed to West Dundee. In 1958, the Faleses purchased the Petitti farm, and in 1961 the Winmoor and Whitney farms added to the family holdings. By 1960, Sleepy Hollow's population was 311. By 1970, it had grown to 1,729. The only commercial activity was the Sleepy Hollow Resort Motel (later renamed the Chateau Louise) and Crichton's Super Mart. In 1966, the Glen Oak Country Club was opened as a member-supported outdoor pool facility (which was later transferred to the Dundee Township Park District.) Later, the Sleepy Hollow Elementary School was opened adjacent to the pool.

The Sleepy Hollow population continued to increase through the 1980s and 1990s as the remaining lots in Falese's original subdivision were developed and as three other adjacent subdivisions were annexed: Saddle Club Estates, and Surrey Ridge and the Bluffs. Sleepy Hollow's ability to annex additional land to the west and south is limited by an agreement with the city of Elgin, which also provides for the city to supply water to the village.

Sleepy Hollow has had its own police force since the 1960s. For years, it was a one-man force: Larry Sabatino Jr., the second police chief. The village named a park in his memory. On March 9, 2014, the Sleepy Hollow police force had its first fatal shooting in a domestic disturbance case.

In 2016, the village held a referendum to increase property taxes due to declining tax revenues and increased personnel costs. Officials urged voters to approve the tax increase or the village government could be dissolved. Voters approved a 33 percent property tax increase on March 15, 2016.

== Subdivisions in Sleepy Hollow ==
The main subdivisions in Sleepy Hollow are:

- Deer Creek, a subdivision started in the 1990s by Windsor Development, and then became a custom home subdivision.
- Saddle Club Estates, a subdivision built in the late 1980s by PulteGroup featuring a park, green space, wooded lots, and some English and walkout basements.
- Sleepy Hollow Manor, the original subdivision to Sleepy Hollow still has some vacancies.
- Surrey Ridge, a condo, coach home, and single family subdivision started in the late 1980s by Windsor Development.
- The Bluffs, the newest subdivision in Sleepy Hollow, featuring semi-custom and custom homes.

== Gardens ==
As a way to connect with residents, Sleepy Hollow operates a community garden, which rents garden plots to residents for personal gardening. The village also maintains the "Giving Garden", from which produce is donated to local food pantries. As part of the rental agreement for the community garden, renters must volunteer at the Giving Garden.
