= West Dundee, Illinois =

West Dundee
- Village
- Village of West Dundee
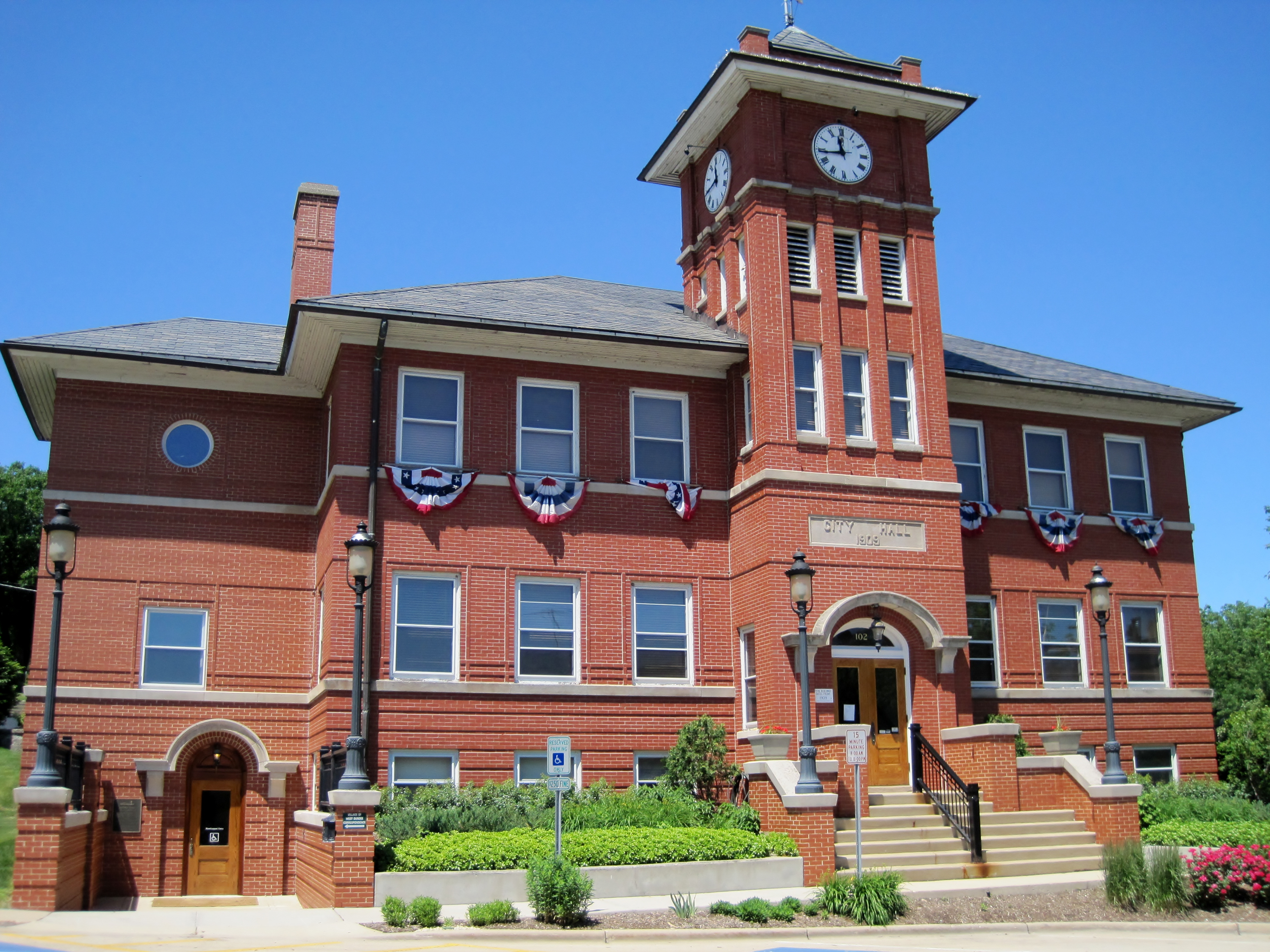
- Village Hall

- Flag Logo
- Motto: At the River's Bend
- Location of West Dundee in Kane County, Illinois.

- Location of Illinois in the United States
- Coordinates: 42°06′27″N 88°18′50″W
- Country: United States
- State: Illinois
- County: Kane
- Township: Dundee and Rutland

Government
  - Type: The Village of West Dundee, Kane County, Illinois is a home rule municipality as provided under Article VII, Section 6 of the Constitution of the State of Illinois.
  - Village President: Christopher Nelson

Area
  - Total: 3.86 sq mi (10.01 km^{2})
  - Land: 3.75 sq mi (9.71 km^{2})
  - Water: 0.12 sq mi (0.30 km^{2})
- Elevation: 840 ft (260 m)

Population (2020)
  - Total: 7,686
  - Density: 2,049/sq mi (791.2/km^{2})
- Time zone: UTC-6 (CST)
  - Summer (DST): UTC-5 (CDT)
- ZIP Code(s): 60118
- Area code(s): 224/847
- FIPS code: 17-80125
- GNIS feature ID: 2400129
- Wikimedia Commons: West Dundee, Illinois
- Website: www.wdundee.org

West Dundee is a village in Kane County, Illinois, United States. The population was 7,686 as of the 2020 US Census. It is considered a far northwest Chicago suburb.

West Dundee lies across the Fox River from East Dundee and Carpentersville.

== Geography ==
According to the 2021 census gazetteer files, West Dundee has a total area of 3.87 square miles (10.02 km^{2}), of which 3.75 square miles (9.71 km^{2}) (or 97.00%) is land and 0.12 square miles (0.31 km^{2}) (or 3.00%) is water.

== Demographics ==
Historical population
Census	Pop.	Note	%±
1880	585		—
1890	873		49.2%
1900	1,348		54.4%
1910	1,380		2.4%
1920	1,587		15.0%
1930	1,697		6.9%
1940	1,831		7.9%
1950	1,948		6.4%
1960	2,530		29.9%
1970	3,295		30.2%
1980	3,551		7.8%
1990	3,728		5.0%
2000	5,428		45.6%
2010	7,331		35.1%
2020	7,686		4.8%
U.S. Decennial Census; 2010 2020

=== Racial and ethnic composition ===
West Dundee village, Illinois – Racial and ethnic composition Note: the US Census treats Hispanic/Latino as an ethnic category. This table excludes Latinos from the racial categories and assigns them to a separate category. Hispanics/Latinos may be of any race.
Race / Ethnicity (NH = Non-Hispanic)	Pop 2000	Pop 2010	Pop 2020	% 2000	% 2010	% 2020
White alone (NH)	4,951	5,824	5,461	91.21%	79.44%	71.05%
Black or African American alone (NH)	33	129	261	0.61%	1.76%	3.40%
Native American or Alaska Native alone (NH)	13	10	9	0.24%	0.14%	0.12%
Asian alone (NH)	120	519	500	2.21%	7.08%	6.51%
Native Hawaiian or Pacific Islander alone (NH)	0	3	0	0.00%	0.04%	0.00%
Other race alone (NH)	5	8	26	0.09%	0.11%	0.34%
Mixed race or Multiracial (NH)	75	87	270	1.38%	1.19%	3.51%
Hispanic or Latino (any race)	231	751	1,159	4.26%	10.24%	15.08%
Total	5,428	7,331	7,686	100.00%	100.00%	100.00%

=== 2020 census ===
As of the 2020 census, West Dundee had a population of 7,686. There were 2,046 families residing in the village. The population density was 1,987.59 inhabitants per square mile (767.41/km^{2}).

The median age was 39.5 years. 19.7% of residents were under the age of 18 and 14.2% of residents were 65 years of age or older. For every 100 females there were 96.7 males, and for every 100 females age 18 and over there were 95.8 males age 18 and over.

99.8% of residents lived in urban areas, while 0.2% lived in rural areas.

There were 3,067 households in West Dundee, of which 28.4% had children under the age of 18 living in them. Of all households, 51.8% were married-couple households, 17.0% were households with a male householder and no spouse or partner present, and 23.8% were households with a female householder and no spouse or partner present. About 25.3% of all households were made up of individuals and 8.7% had someone living alone who was 65 years of age or older.

There were 3,257 housing units at an average density of 842.25 per square mile (325.19/km^{2}), of which 5.8% were vacant. The homeowner vacancy rate was 0.9% and the rental vacancy rate was 10.2%.

=== Income and poverty ===
The median income for a household in the village was $95,707, and the median income for a family was $109,868. Males had a median income of $56,607 versus $46,853 for females. The per capita income for the village was $43,327. About 1.8% of families and 4.5% of the population were below the poverty line, including 1.9% of those under age 18 and 4.8% of those age 65 or over.

== History ==
In 1835, Elder John and Nancy Oatman established a tavern and a store that became the core of the community. Others settlers came, and in 1837 they held a lottery to determine who would name the town. Alexander Gardiner won and named the town Dundee in honor of his Scottish hometown, with which West Dundee is now sister cities. In 1843 Scotsman Allan Pinkerton, later the renowned detective, set up business as a cooper. The town was incorporated in 1887.

Dundee was hemmed in from development for years. The Fox River formed a natural eastern barrier. To the north and west, the D. Hill Nursery, founded in 1855 by William Hill, specialized in fruit trees. The business grew to include evergreens, some of which were sent to Chicago for the World's Columbian Exposition in 1893. Expanding to 900 acres, the nursery survived the Great Depression by running a cattle feed operation that continued through World War II. Some of the thousands of seasonal workers traveled to work from Chicago by electric rail, while the majority lived on the nursery grounds.

In the 1950s, a segment of the Hill property was sold and turned into the Highlands subdivision, which was annexed into West Dundee in 1956. The community also annexed property west of Illinois 31 in 1957, Royal Lane in 1960, and the Old World subdivision in 1966. The nursery eventually sold all of its land and moved to McHenry County. Plans for the Spring Hill Mall on Hill's land began in 1973 and the project was completed in 1980. The 1.1 million-square-foot mall's retail sales boosted West Dundee's economy and created an estimated 1,600 jobs by 1982. New subdivisions were built to the west of Spring Hill Mall.

With a population of 7,331 (2010 Census data), West Dundee has managed to keep its quaintness and small-town feeling intact. Designated historical sites fill the downtown and surrounding residential neighborhood. Restored buildings include structures reported to have provided refuge for slaves on the Underground Railroad. Portions of downtown West Dundee are included with the Dundee Township Historic District on the National Register of Historic Places.

== Government ==
The Village of West Dundee, Kane County, Illinois is a home rule municipality as contemplated under Article VII, Section 6 of the Constitution of the State of Illinois. The Village of West Dundee functions as a Council-Manager style of government. The Village President and six-member Board of Trustees are elected at-large on a nonpartisan basis for staggered four-year terms. Board elections are held during odd-numbered years.

The Village Manager is employed on a full-time basis at the will of the Village Board to perform the functions and duties specified in Title 1, Chapter 7B of the West Dundee Municipal Code, and to perform such other legally permissible and proper duties and functions as the Village Board shall from time to time designate. The Village Manager oversees the employees and departments of the Village, including Administration, Finance, Community Development, Police, Fire and Public Works. The Village of West Dundee employs fewer than 60 full-time employees.

== Transportation ==
Pace provides bus service on Route 550, 552, and 803 connecting West Dundee to Crystal Lake, Elgin, and other destinations.

== Notable resident ==
- Brogan Rafferty, professional ice hockey player

== See also ==
- Dundee Township Historic District
