= Fabyan =

Fabyan may refer to:

== People ==
- George Fabyan (1867–1936), businessman and founder of a cryptology research laboratory
- Robert Fabyan (died c. 1512), English chronicler

== Locations ==
- Fabyan, Alberta, a hamlet in Canada
- Fabyan House, a former hotel in New Hampshire
- Fabyan Windmill, in Geneva, Illinois
- Fabyan Villa, in Geneva, Illinois
- Fabyan, Connecticut, a village
