= Fabyan Villa =

Historic house in Illinois, United States

- U.S. National Register of Historic Places
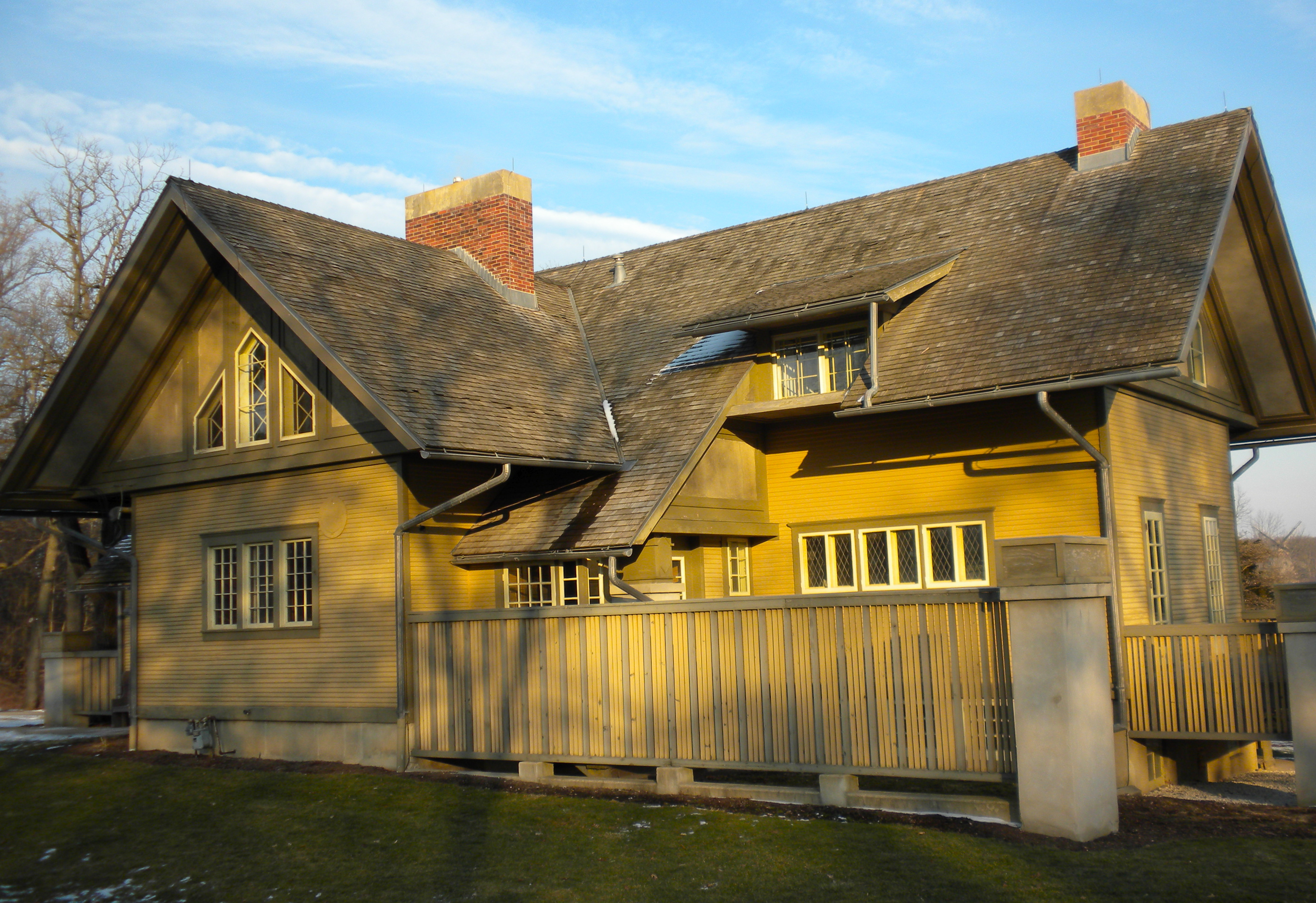

- Location within Illinois
- Interactive map showing the location of Fabyan Villa
- Location: Geneva, Illinois
- Coordinates: 41°52′16″N 88°18′43″W
- Built: 1907
- Architect: Frank Lloyd Wright
- Architectural style: Prairie School
- NRHP reference No.: 84001128
- Added to NRHP: February 9, 1984

Fabyan Villa was the home of George and Nelle Fabyan from c. 1908 to 1939. The house is notable because of its remodelling in 1907 by Frank Lloyd Wright. It was the centerpiece of the Fabyans country estate, which they named Riverbank. The Kane County Forest Preserve District of Illinois purchased the majority of the Fabyan estate in 1939, and operated the Fabyans' home as a museum off and on beginning in 1940. In 1995 Preservation Partners of the Fox Valley was enlisted to operate the site and developed the Fabyan Villa Museum into a Fabyan historic home museum, where photographs, the Fabyans' personal artifact collections, and a limited number of original furnishings, as well as the Riverbank story are shared with the public.

== Fabyan country estate, Riverbank ==
George Fabyan was a millionaire businessman who had a thirst for knowledge. Inheritance from his tycoon-father's textile business, Bliss, Fabyan & Co., provided the financial foundation from which the Colonel and his wife, Nelle, established their legacy. Riverbank, their estate on the Fox River in Geneva, Illinois spanned approximately 300 acres (1.2 km^{2}) and featured, among other things, a Japanese Garden, private zoo, Roman-style swimming pool, greenhouses, gardens, grottoes, a lighthouse, a Dutch-style windmill, a country club, a small farm and a scientific laboratory complex.

The mid-1800s farmhouse that the Fabyans acquired in 1905 was dubbed by them, The Villa. In 1907, the farmhouse was extensively redesigned by Frank Lloyd Wright, who added a south wing, three verandas and large eaves to achieve a cruciform modestly Prairie-style country house. Other hallmarks of Wright's organic architecture found in the Fabyan Villa are geometric window motifs, 'light screens' (bands of windows), string-coursing, open floor plan and wood-spindle screening.

In 1910, the Fabyans hired Taro Otsuka to design a Japanese-style garden below the villa. The one-acre garden was developed over the next several years, and from 1918 on, maintained by Susumu Kobayashi, a Japanese immigrant gardener. Japanese gardens were popular amongst the upper class, and it was a well-known attraction throughout the 1920s and 1930s. Although neglected for decades after the Fabyans, the Fabyan Japanese Garden was renovated beginning in 1974, and today contains restored and replicated original elements including a pond, waterfall, moon bridge, oversized lantern, and teahouse.

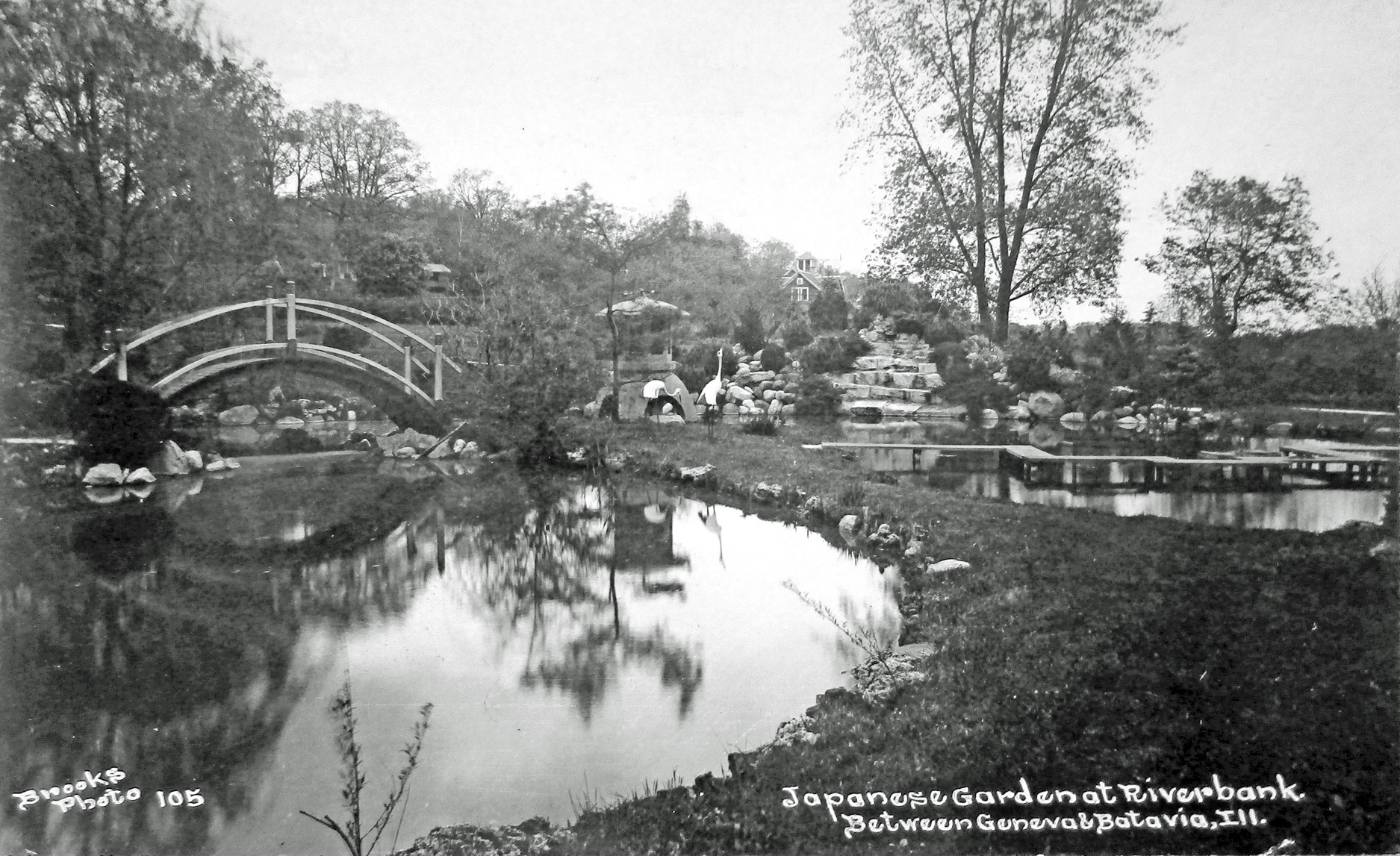
Japanese garden at the Fabyan Villa, Geneva, Illinois, c.1920s

In 1914, the Fabyans purchased a windmill located on a farm near what is now Elmhurst, Illinois and had it relocated to the east bank of the Fox River across from the Villa on acreage acquired that same year. The Fabyan Windmill is unique due to the bakery it houses that, according to legend, was used to bake bread for the Fabyans' pet bears. During wartime rationing, the Windmill was used to grind grain for the surrounding community: a deed that was later honored by means of a U.S. postal stamp.

== Riverbank Laboratories ==
Between 1912 and 1922, Fabyan created Riverbank Laboratories, the first privately owned research facility in the United States. In fact, the National Security Agency has recognized Riverbank Laboratories as the birthplace of cryptology and has honored Fabyan for his associated services to the United States' government. Nearly all American military World War I cryptography was done at Fabyan's laboratories, where Elizabeth Wells Gallup and her staff of assistants, including Elizebeth Friedman and William F. Friedman, had spent several years honing cryptology skills and methodology searching for proof of Sir Francis Bacon's authorship of Shakespeare's plays using Bacon's own ciphers.

This site also contained George's and Nelle's private library and museum. In 1918, Fabyan built the first reverberation chamber in the US for Harvard physicist Wallace Clement Sabine, the pioneer researcher in architectural acoustics. The acoustic laboratory is still in use today as a testing facility.

== See also ==
- List of Frank Lloyd Wright works

== Bibliography ==
- Storrer, William Allin (1993). The Frank Lloyd Wright Companion. Chicago: University of Chicago Press. ISBN 978-0-226-77624-8. (S.129)
