= Riverbank Publications =

Pamphlets written by workers of George Fabyan

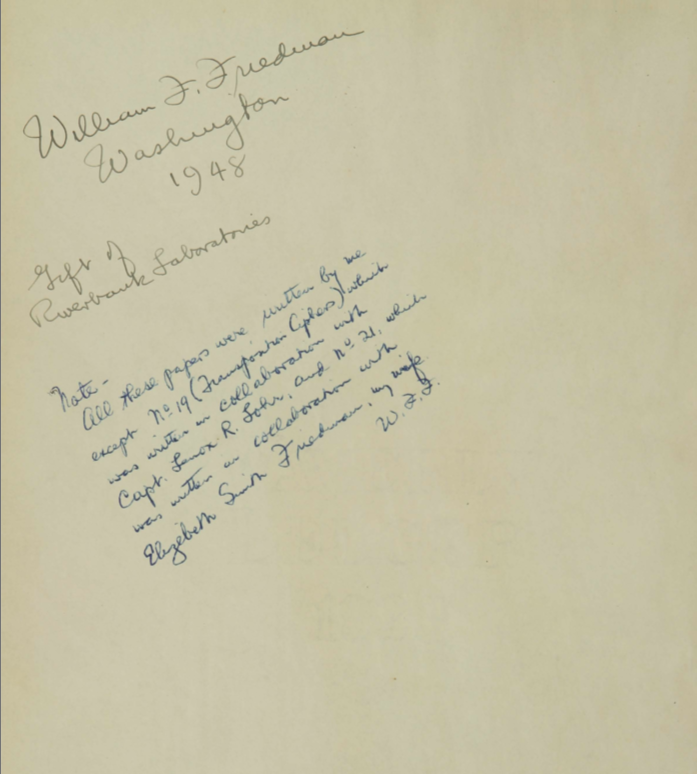
Inscription by William Friedman in the Marshall Library’s copy of the Riverbank Publications 15-22.

The Riverbank Publications is a series of pamphlets written by the people who worked for millionaire George Fabyan in the multi-discipline research facility he built in the early 20th century near Chicago. They were published by Fabyan, often without author credit. The publications on cryptanalysis, mostly written by William Friedman, with contributions from Elizebeth Smith Friedman and others, are considered seminal in the field. In particular, Publication 22 introduced the Index of Coincidence, a powerful statistical tool for cryptanalysis.

== List of publications on cryptography ==
The Riverbank Publications dealt with many subjects investigated at the laboratories. The ones dealing with cryptography began with number 15, and consists of:

- 15, A Method of Reconstructing the Primary Alphabet From a Single One of the Series of Secondary Alphabets, 1917
- 16, Methods for the Solution of Running-Key Ciphers, 1918
- 17, An Introduction to Methods for the Solution of Ciphers, 1918
- 18, Synoptic Tables for the Solution of Ciphers and A Bibliography of Cryptographic Literature, 1918
- 19, Formulae for the Solution of Geometrical Transposition Ciphers, written with Capt. Lenox R. Lohr, 1918
- 20, Several Machine Ciphers and Methods for their Solution, 1918
- 21, Methods for the Reconstruction of Primary Alphabets, written with Elizebeth Smith Friedman, 1918
- 22, The Index of Coincidence and Its Applications in Cryptography, imprint L. Fournier, Paris, 1922
- 50, The production and detection of messages in concealed writing and images, by H. O. Nolan, 1918
- 75, Memorization Methods: Specifically Illustrated in Respect to Their Applicability to Codes and Topographic Material, by H. O. Nolan, 1919,

Except as noted, the above publications were written by William F. Friedman and were published by George Fabyan's Riverbank Laboratories in Geneva, Illinois.
