= Dutch Windmill =

Dutch Windmill may refer to:

- Bep van Klaveren, Dutch boxer who was nicknamed The Dutch Windmill
- Fabyan Windmill, windmill in Geneva, Illinois, United States
- List of windmills in the Netherlands
- Speculaas, also known as Dutch Windmill cookies
- Dutch Windmill, one of two Golden Gate Park windmills in San Francisco, California
