= George Fabyan =

American businessman (1867–1936)

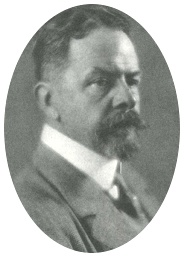
- Born: March 15, 1867; Boston, Massachusetts, US
- Died: May 17, 1936 (aged 69); Geneva, Illinois, US
- Burial place: Forest Hills Cemetery, Boston, Massachusetts
- Title: Colonel
- Spouse: Nelle Wright (m. 1887–1936)
- Parents: George Fabyan (father); Isabella Fabyan (mother)

"Colonel" George Fabyan (March 15, 1867 – May 17, 1936) was an American businessman who founded Riverbank Laboratories, a private research laboratory. Fabyan's laboratory pioneered modern cryptography and was the forerunner of the NSA. The National Security Agency has recognized Riverbank Laboratories as the birthplace of U.S. cryptology.

== Early life ==
Fabyan was born on March 15, 1867, in Boston, to George and Isabella Fabyan, the second child and eldest son of five children. He left home at age 17. Eventually ending up in Chicago, he ran the Chicago office of his tycoon father's textile business Bliss, Fabyan & Co. from 1895 on. His inheritance from Bliss, Fabyan & Co. provided the financial foundation from which he and his wife, Nelle, established their legacy.

Illinois Governor Richard Yates Jr. appointed Fabyan to his military guard in 1901, giving him the honorary title of Colonel, by which he was later known.

In May, 1909 Fabyan was awarded the Order of the Rising Sun by the Japanese government for his service. Fabyan had spent some time in Japan before 1905, developing relations with Japanese government and business representatives. He was appointed as a liaison to General Kuroki Tamemoto during the Russo-Japanese peace negotiations (Treaty of Portsmouth) held in Maine in 1905. Between 1907 and 1910, he served as a host for General Kuroki, Baron Komura, and Prince Fushimi during their visits to Chicago.

== Properties ==
He and his wife developed a 325-acre country estate in Geneva, Illinois, 40 miles west of Chicago, beginning with the purchase of 10 acres on the west bank of the Fox River. "Riverbank", as they named their estate, featured among other things, a Japanese Garden, a private zoo, a Roman-style swimming pool, a lighthouse, two windmills, gardens, grottoes, greenhouses, a farm and the research laboratory. They lived on their estate from 1908 to 1939 in a farmhouse remodeled by Frank Lloyd Wright, which they called the Fabyan Villa. This site also contained George's and Nelle's expansive private library and museum.

In 1914 Fabyan purchased and had moved a Dutch-style windmill built c. 1870 from its original farm site in York Center, Illinois to his estate. Known as the Fabyan Windmill, this 5-story grist mill was restored to working order in 2004.

== Baconian theory ==
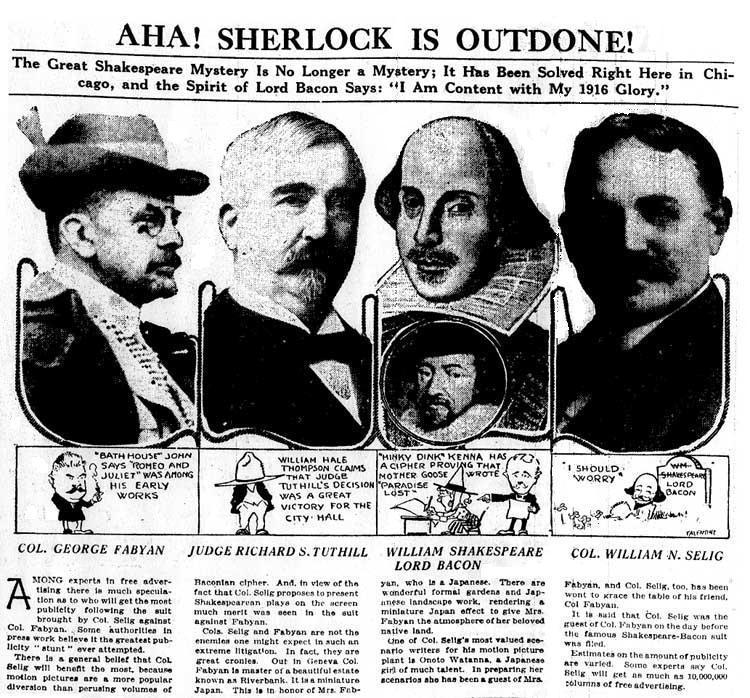
Newspaper report of the 1916 trial, Chicago Tribune, depicting (left to right) Fabyan, Tuthill, Shakespeare, Selig.

Fabyan supported the Baconian theory, which was popular at the time, that Shakespeare's plays were written by Francis Bacon. He established a cryptologic research group to study alleged ciphers in Shakespeare's work. Known as Riverbank Laboratories, it was the first privately owned research facility in the United States.

In 1916, William Selig, a film producer, sued Fabyan on the grounds that profits from forthcoming films of Shakespeare's works, along with a film on the life of Shakespeare, would be damaged by Fabyan's claims that Bacon was the author. On 9 March 1916, he obtained a temporary injunction stopping the publication of a book by Fabyan on the subject. Selig was intending to capitalise on the celebrations organised for the upcoming 300th anniversary of Shakespeare's death, which occurred in April 1616. A Cook Country Circuit Court judge, Richard Tuthill, found against Shakespeare's authorship - he determined that Bacon's ciphers identified by Fabyan's analyst Elizabeth Wells Gallup were authentic and that Francis Bacon was therefore the author of the works. Damages of $5,000 were awarded to Fabyan for the interference with the publication of the book. In the ensuing uproar, Tuthill rescinded his decision on 2 May 1916, and another judge, Frederick A. Smith, dismissed the ruling on 21 July 1916. It was later suggested by the press that the case was concocted by both parties for publicity, since Selig and Fabyan were known to be old friends.

Elizebeth Smith, a Shakespearean scholar, was employed by Fabyan to work with Gallup. Later, a geneticist employed by Fabyan, William F. Friedman, joined the effort, initially as a photographer, and then later drawn into the cryptography effort, such that he eventually became the head of the Codes & Ciphers department in Friedman's lab. Both Elizebeth and William went on to have significant careers in cryptanalysis (a term coined by William), and their work became the foundation for what later became the NSA. Decades after working for Fabyan, William and Elizebeth collaborated on a study to discredit the ciphers that Gallup claimed to have discovered. This book won the Folger Shakespeare Library Literary Prize of $1000 in 1955 for its definitive study that is considered to have disproven the claims of all researchers that the works of Shakespeare contain hidden ciphers that disclose Bacon's — or any other candidate's — secret authorship. The study was condensed and published in 1957 as The Shakespearean Ciphers Examined.

== World War I ==
The Friedmans played a significant role in World War I. Nearly all American military World War I cryptography was done at Fabyan's laboratories. In particular they uncovered a plot against the British by Indian nationalists supported by the Germans. The National Security Agency has recognized Riverbank Laboratories as the birthplace of U.S. cryptology, and honored Fabyan in 1992 with a plaque reading "To the Memory of George Fabyan From a Grateful Government: In recognition of the voluntary and confidential service rendered by Colonel Fabyan and his Riverbank Laboratories in the sensitive areas of cryptanalysis and cryptologic training during a critical time of national need on the eve of America's entry into World War I".

== Death and legacy ==
Fabyan died in 1936 from complications of pleurisy. He left $175,000 (equivalent to $4,060,300 in 2025) to his wife Nelle, and a $150 (equivalent to $3,480 in 2025) monthly stipend to his secretary, Belle Cumming. At George's request, his wife burned some of his papers after his death, despite pleas from William Friedman, but other papers survived and are now at the New York Public Library. Nelle died of cancer in 1939 and the estate was sold to the county for $70,500 (equivalent to $1,631,800 in 2025); it is now part of the Kane County Forest Preserve District. The acoustic laboratory Fabyan built still operates as the Riverbank Laboratories, and his home is now the Fabyan Villa museum. The restored windmill is open to the public on summer weekends, as of 2019. The laboratory and windmill are listed on the National Register of Historic Places.

== Works ==
- Fabyan, George (1905). What I Know About the Future of Cotton and Domestic Goods. George Fabyan.—consists of 100 blank pages, a commentary on the imponderables of commerce.
- The Riverbank Publications, a series of pamphlets written by Fabyan's staff on their research and published by Fabyan. The publications on cryptanalysis, mostly written by William Friedman and Elizebeth Smith Friedman, though uncredited, are considered seminal in the field.

== See also ==
- Alfred Lee Loomis
