= Paul Earls Sabine =

American acoustic engineer

Paul Earls Sabine (22 January 1879 – 28 December 1958) was an American acoustic engineer and a specialist on acoustic architecture. Sound absorbing boards made of porous gypsum was sometimes known by the tradename Sabinite. He was a director at the Riverbank Laboratories until his retirement in 1947.

Sabine was born in Albion, Illinois, to Methodist pastor Charles and Rebecca Likely née McClure. He was educated at McKendree College (1899) before going to Harvard University from where he received a doctorate in 1915. He taught physics for a while and in 1919 he replaced his cousin Wallace Clement Sabine (who died from cancer) as director of the Riverbank Acoustical Laboratories (which later became a part of the Illinois Institute of Technology). He developed the work of his cousin and specialized in acoustic architecture and was a consultant for architects and involved in the design of the Radio City Music Hall, New York; Fels Planetarium, Philadelphia; and the House and Senate Chambers. He established relationships between total sound absorption, reverberation and the absorptive properties of materials while also innovating measurement, standards, and absorptive materials. A porous gypsum plaster to line walls and meant to absorb sounds was developed in 1924 by the Keasbey Mattison laboratories and marketed as Sabinite. During World War II he worked at the Harvard Underwater Sound Laboratory. After his retirement in 1947, he moved to Colorado Springs and spent a lot of time on Christianity, and its relationship to science which he wrote about in Atoms, Men and God (1953). He published the landmark book Acoustics and Architecture (1932). His son Hale Johnson Sabine (1909-1981) also became an acoustics specialist.
