= Elizebeth Smith Friedman =

American cryptanalyst and author (1892–1980)

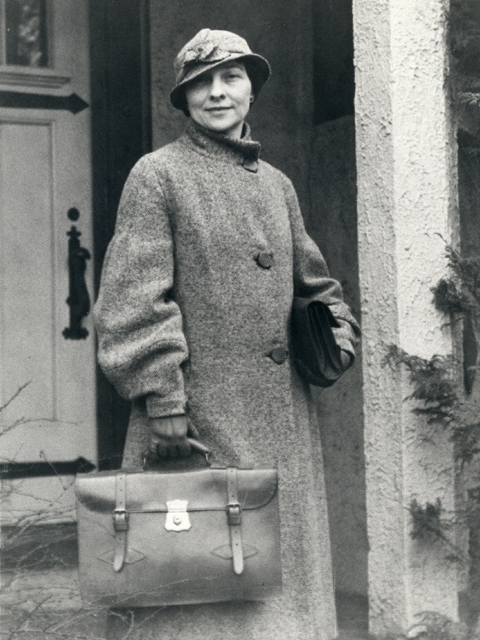
- Born: Elizebeth Smith; August 26, 1892; Huntington, Indiana U.S.
- Died: October 31, 1980 (aged 88); Plainfield, New Jersey U.S.
- Occupation: Cryptanalyst
- Years active: 1916–1971
- Known for: "America's first female cryptanalyst"
- Spouse: William F. Friedman
- Children: 2

Elizebeth Smith Friedman (August 26, 1892 – October 31, 1980) was an American cryptanalyst and author who deciphered enemy codes in both World Wars and helped to solve international smuggling cases during Prohibition. Over the course of her career, she worked for the United States Treasury, Coast Guard, Navy and Army, and the International Monetary Fund. She has been called "America's first female cryptanalyst".

== Early life and education ==
Friedman was born in Huntington, Indiana, to John Marion Smith, a Quaker dairyman, banker, and politician, and Sophia Smith (née Strock). Friedman was the youngest of nine surviving children (a tenth died in infancy) and was raised on a farm.

From 1911 to 1913, Friedman attended Wooster College in Ohio, but left when her mother became ill. In 1913, Friedman transferred to Hillsdale College in Michigan, as it was closer to home. In 1915, she graduated with a major in English literature. She was a member of Pi Beta Phi. Having exhibited her interest in languages, she had also studied Latin, Greek, and German, and minored "in a great many other things." Only she and one other sibling attended college. In 1938, Hillsdale awarded her an honorary doctor of laws degree.

In the fall of 1915, Friedman became the substitute principal of a public high school in Wabash, Indiana. The position was short-lived, however, and in the spring of 1916, she quit and moved back in with her parents.

== Career ==
=== Riverbank Laboratories and World War I ===
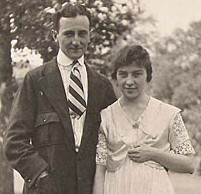
William and Elizebeth Friedman, recently married, at Riverbank in 1917

Elizebeth Smith began working at Riverbank Laboratories in Geneva, Illinois, in 1916. It was one of the first facilities in the U.S. established to study cryptography. Colonel George Fabyan, a wealthy textile merchant, owned Riverbank Laboratories and was interested in Shakespeare. Friedman was looking for a job and visited Chicago's Newberry Library, where she talked to a librarian who knew of Fabyan's interest. The librarian called Fabyan, who appeared in his limousine and invited Elizebeth to spend a night at Riverbank, where they discussed what life would be like at Fabyan's great estate located in Geneva, Illinois. He told her that she would assist a Boston woman, Elizabeth Wells Gallup, and her sister with Gallup's attempt to prove Sir Francis Bacon had written Shakespeare's plays and sonnets. The work would involve decrypting enciphered messages that were supposed to have been contained within the plays and poems.

On the staff at Riverbank was the man Elizebeth would marry in May 1917, William F. Friedman, a plant biologist who also became involved in the Bacon-Shakespeare project.

Riverbank gathered historical information on secret writing. Military cryptography had been deemphasized after the Civil War to the point that there were only three or four people in the United States who knew anything about the subject. Two of those people were Elizebeth and William Friedman. When the United States entered World War I, Fabyan established a new Riverbank Department of Ciphers, with the Friedmans in charge, and offered their services to the government. During the war, the Friedmans developed many of the principles of modern cryptology. Several U.S. government departments asked Riverbank Labs for help or sent personnel there for training. Among those was Agnes Meyer Driscoll, who came on behalf of the U.S. Navy.

The Friedmans worked together for the next four years in what was the only cryptographic facility in the country, until Herbert Yardley's so-called "Black Chamber" was established as MI8, the Army's Cipher Bureau, in 1919. In 1921, the Friedmans left Riverbank to work for the War Department in Washington, D.C. Their previous efforts to leave had been thwarted by Fabyan, who intercepted their mail.

=== Prohibition ===
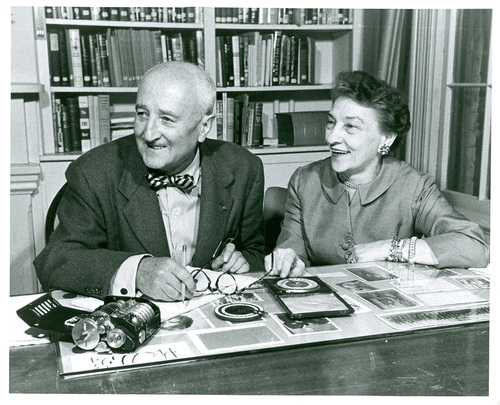
William F. Friedman and Elizebeth Smith Friedman

The 1919 National Prohibition Act, also known as the Volstead Act, forbade the manufacture, sale, or trade of liquor in the United States. However, Prohibition, which was in effect from 1920 to 1933, did not stop the demand for alcoholic beverages, and the Coast Guard was put in charge of stopping smugglers along the coasts. Bootleggers and smugglers brought liquor and narcotics into the U.S., as well as items that would be heavily taxed if imported openly, such as perfume, jewels, and even pinto beans.

The smugglers used encrypted Morse code radio messages extensively to conduct their operations. In response, the Coast Guard hired Elizebeth Friedman, who had quit her job in 1922, on a temporary basis to decode their backlog of messages. Eventually, she and a small team of cryptanalysts she trained led the effort against international smuggling and drug-running.

While early codes and ciphers were very basic, their subsequent increase in complexity and resistance to solution was important to the financial growth of smuggling operations. The extent of sophistication posed little problem for Friedman; she mounted successful attacks against simple substitution and transposition ciphers, as well as the more complex ciphers which eventually came into use.

In 1927, the U.S. Treasury Department's Bureau of Prohibition and of Customs established a joint effort with the U.S. Coast Guard Intelligence Division to monitor international smuggling, drug-running, and criminal activity domestically and internationally. From 1927 to 1939, the unit, which was of critical importance, was folded into the U.S. Coast Guard.

Friedman solved the bulk of intercepts collected by Coast Guard stations in San Francisco and Florida herself. In June 1928, she was sent to teach C.A. Housel, stationed with the Coordinator of the Pacific Coast Details, how to decrypt rumrunners' messages. Under her teaching, Housel was able to decode 3,300 messages within 21 months. In October and November 1929, she was then recruited in Houston, Texas, to solve 650 smuggling traffic cases that had been subpoenaed by the United States Attorney. In doing so, she decrypted 24 coding systems used by smugglers. Friedman's work was responsible for providing decoded information that resulted in the conviction of the narcotics-smuggling Ezra Brothers.

While working for the U.S. Coast Guard, the Bureau of Narcotics, the Bureau of Internal Revenue, the Bureau of Prohibition and Customs, and the Department of Justice, Friedman solved over 12,000 coded messages by hand in three years, resulting in 650 criminal prosecutions. One of the individuals Friedman helped to indict was Al Capone.

In 1930, Friedman proposed creating a team of seven people to handle the increasing workload involved in decrypting messages. Her proposal was finally approved in 1931, and she was put in charge of the only codebreaking unit in America ever to be managed by a woman. She recruited and trained the analysts, and by the end of 1932, had developed the best radio intelligence team in the country. This allowed her to address new, atypical systems as they appeared and expedited the entire process from initial analysis through to solution. It also allowed her to stay one step ahead of the smugglers. "Our office doesn't make 'em, we only break 'em," said Friedman to a visitor who tried to sell her code-making assistance. The NSA notes that she did "break 'em" many times over a variety of targets. Her successes led to the conviction of many violators of the Volstead Act.

In addition to her cryptanalytic successes, she often testified in cases against accused parties. She appeared as an expert witness in 33 cases and became famous as a result of newspaper and magazine articles about her. The messages she deciphered enabled her to implicate several smugglers in the Gulf of Mexico and on the Pacific Coast. She testified in cases in Galveston and Houston in Texas. In 1933 she was a star witness at the New Orleans, Louisiana, trial of 23 suspected agents of the Consolidated Exporters Corporation. Her testimony resulted in the convictions of five of the ringleaders, who were directly linked with smuggling vessels as a result of her analysis.

The next year she helped settle a dispute between the Canadian and U.S. governments over the true ownership of the sailing vessel I'm Alone. The vessel was flying the Canadian flag when it was sunk by USCGC Dexter for failing to heed a "heave to and be searched" signal. The Canadian government filed a $350,000 suit against the U.S., but the intelligence gleaned from the twenty-three messages decoded by Friedman indicated de facto U.S. ownership just as the U.S. had originally suspected. The true owners of the ship were identified and most of the Canadian claim was dismissed.

The Canadian government sought Friedman's help in 1937 with an opium-smuggling gang, and she eventually testified in the trial of Gordon Lim and several other Chinese. Her solution to a complicated unknown Chinese enciphered code, in spite of her unfamiliarity with the language, was key to the successful convictions.

=== World War II ===
During World War II, Friedman's Coast Guard unit was transferred to the Navy, where they were the principal U.S. source of intelligence on Operation Bolívar, the clandestine German network in South America. Prior to the Japanese attack on Pearl Harbor that brought the U.S. into the war, there was concern that Germany could eventually attack the U.S. via Latin America. The Nazi authorities also saw Latin America as a potential opportunity to outflank the U.S. While the FBI was given responsibility for countering this threat, at the time, the one U.S. agency with staff experienced in detecting and monitoring clandestine spy transmissions was the Coast Guard, due to its earlier work against smugglers, and Friedman's team was its sole cryptanalytic asset.

Friedman's team remained the primary U.S. code-breakers assigned to the South American threat, and they solved numerous cipher systems used by the Germans and their local sympathizers, including three separate Enigma machines. According to cables between Britain's Bletchley Park and Washington, D.C. at the time, the two organizations exchanged solutions. The Bletchley Park section that solved the spy Enigmas was known as ISK, Intelligence Service Knox, and the American section was the Friedman's Coast Guard Cryptanalytic Unit 387. The two sections worked independently and ended up solving the machines around the same time. One turned out to be an unrelated Swiss network, but the other two were used by Johannes Siegfried Becker (codename: ’’Sargo’’), the SS agent who headed the operation, to communicate with Germany. Regarding Becker, biographer Jason Fagone states: “Elizebeth was his nemesis. She successfully tracked him where every other law enforcement agency and intelligence agencies failed. She did what the FBI could not do.” After the spy ring was broken, Argentina, Bolivia and Chile broke with the Axis powers and supported the Allies.

Over the course of the war, Friedman's team decoded 4,000 messages sent on 48 different radio circuits. The work of Friedman's Unit 387 (Coast Guard Cryptanalytic Unit) was often in support of the FBI and J. Edgar Hoover, and was not always credited. In fact, Friedman was irritated by the "sloppiness" of the FBI, for example in rounding up spies in South America, thus alerting the Nazis that their codes had been broken. At the end of World War II, Hoover began a public media campaign claiming that the FBI led the code-breaking effort that resulted in the collapse and arrest of the German spy network in South America. This effort included a story in The American Magazine titled "How the Nazi Spy Invasion Was Smashed" and a publicity film called The Battle of the United States. Neither mentioned Friedman or the Coast Guard.

In 1944, Friedman helped convict Velvalee Dickinson for having attempted to send information to Japan. Known as the "Doll Woman," her antique doll shop was her cover as she corresponded with Japanese agents using the names of women from her business correspondence. Her messages contained encoded material addressing naval vessel status in Pearl Harbor. The messages were decoded by Friedman and helped convict Dickinson.

After World War II, Friedman became a consultant to the International Monetary Fund and created communications security systems for them based on one-time tapes.

=== Retirement ===
After retirement from government service, Friedman and her husband, who had long been Shakespeare enthusiasts, collaborated on a manuscript, The Cryptologist Looks at Shakespeare, eventually published as The Shakespearean Ciphers Examined. It won awards from the Folger Shakespeare Library and the American Shakespeare Theatre and Academy. In this book, the Friedmans dismissed Baconians such as Gallup and Ignatius Donnelly with such technical proficiency and finesse that the book won far more acclaim than did others that addressed the same topic.

The work that Gallup had done earlier for Col. Fabyan at Riverbank operated on the assumption that Bacon wrote Shakespeare and used the bi-literal cipher he invented in the original printed Shakespeare folios, employing "an odd variety of typefaces." The Friedmans, however, "in a classic demonstration of their life's work," buried a hidden Baconian cipher on a page in their publication. It was an italicized phrase which, using the different type faces, expressed their final assessment of the controversy: "I did not write the plays. F. Bacon." Their book is regarded as the definitive work, if not the final word, on the subject. Ironically, it was the Riverbank effort to prove Bacon wrote Shakespeare that introduced the Friedmans to cryptology.

Following her husband's death in 1969, Friedman devoted much of her retirement life to compiling a library and bibliography of his work. This "most extensive private collection of cryptographic material in the world" was donated to the George C. Marshall Research Library in Lexington, Virginia. In 1971, she donated her own papers, which are now known as The Elizebeth Smith Friedman Collection at the Marshall Foundation.

Friedman belonged to civic organizations such as the League of Women Voters and worked on behalf of statehood for the District of Columbia. She was also a respected public speaker.

== Personal life ==
The rare spelling of her name (it is more commonly spelled "Elizabeth") is attributed to her mother, who disliked the prospect of Elizebeth ever being called "Eliza."

In 1917, Friedman married William F. Friedman, who later became a cryptographer credited with numerous contributions to cryptology, a field to which she introduced him.

They had two children, Barbara Friedman Atchison (1923–2021), and John Ramsay Friedman (1926–2010).

In the 1930s, William Friedman began to show signs of the depression that afflicted him for the rest of his life. Elizebeth supported him and began covering up for him. In January 1941 he was admitted to the Neuropsychiatric Section at Walter Reed General Hospital in Washington, DC, where he spent two and a half months in a mental ward. His condition was deemed to be anxiety due to overwork on a top secret project. After the war, Elizebeth spent more and more of her time taking care of her husband. In April 1955, he suffered his first heart attack. His health continued to worsen, and he died on November 2, 1969.

Elizebeth Friedman died on October 31, 1980, in the Abbott Manor Nursing Home in Plainfield, New Jersey, at the age of 88. She was cremated and her ashes spread over her husband's grave at Arlington National Cemetery.

== Posthumous recognition ==
Friedman's contributions received increasing recognition after her death. Friedman had signed an oath with the U.S. Navy promising to keep her role in World War II secret until her death, and she did so. It was not until 2008 that the documents were finally declassified.

- In 1999, the year of its creation, she was inducted to the NSA Hall of Honor.
- The NSA auditorium, which had been named after William in 1975, was renamed in 1999 the "William and Elizebeth Friedman Auditorium."
- In 2002 NSA's OPS1 building was dedicated as the William and Elizebeth Friedman Building during the Agency's 50th Anniversary Commemoration.
- On June 17, 2014, the Bureau of Alcohol, Tobacco, and Firearms named its national headquarters auditorium after Elizebeth Smith Friedman.
- In 2017, after spending three years researching information about the Friedmans in their personal papers and declassified U.S. and British government files, Jason Fagone published a biography entitled The Woman Who Smashed Codes: A True Story of Love, Spies, and the Unlikely Heroine who Outwitted America’s Enemies.
- In April 2019, the U.S. Senate passed a resolution "Honoring the life and legacy of Elizebeth Smith Friedman, Cryptanalyst".
- On July 7, 2020, the U.S. Coast Guard announced that it was naming the 11th Legend-Class National Security Cutter (NSC) in honor of Elizebeth Smith Friedman. According to the announcement, "Legend-Class cutters honor women and men who have a legendary status in the Coast Guard's rich history." Construction began in May 2021 of the USCGC Friedman (WMSL-760). However, on June 5, 2025, it was announced the contract for Friedman was cancelled, in an agreement between Huntington Ingalls Industries and the Trump administration.
- The Codebreaker, an episode of the television documentary series American Experience about Elizebeth Smith Friedman's life, based on Fagone's biography plus archival letters and photographs, premiered on January 11, 2021.
- In October 2021, Amy Butler Greenfield published her biography The Woman All Spies Fear: Code Breaker Elizebeth Smith Friedman and Her Hidden Life.

== Works and publications ==
- Friedman, William F. and Friedman, Elizebeth Smith Methods for the Reconstruction of Primary Alphabets, Riverbank Publication Number 21, 1917
- Jones, Leonard T.; Friedman, Elizebeth (1945). History of Coast Guard Unit 387 (Cryptanalytic Unit), 1940-1945. National Archives and Records Administration.
- Friedman, William F.; Friedman, Elizebeth S. (1957). The Shakespearean Ciphers Examined: An Analysis of Cryptographic Systems Used As Evidence That Some Author Other Than William Shakespeare Wrote the Plays Commonly Attributed to Him. Cambridge: Cambridge University Press. OCLC 718233.

== See also ==
- Cryptography
- Edward Isaac Ezra
- Velvalee Dickinson
