= Elizabeth Wells Gallup =

American educator and philosopher (1848–1934)

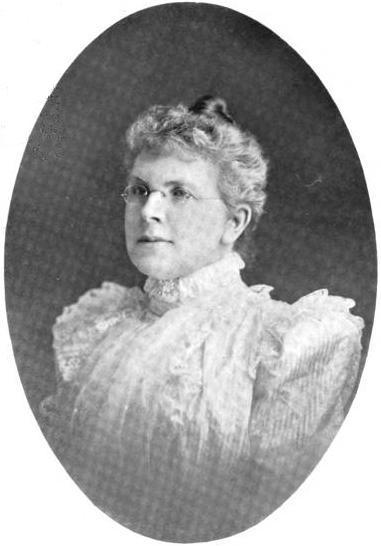
Elizabeth Wells Gallup.

Elizabeth Wells Gallup (1867 in Perú, New York – 1934) was an American educator and exponent of the Baconian theory of Shakespearean authorship.

== Early life and education ==
Gallup was born in 1848. She studied at Michigan State Normal College (now Eastern Michigan University), the Sorbonne and the University of Marburg.

== Career ==
Gallup taught in Michigan for some twenty years and became a high school principal. She used her married name Gallup but retained her maiden name, Wells.

She was interested in the life and work of Francis Bacon (1561–1626) and, together with her sister Kate Wells, initially worked on the theories of Dr. Orville Ward Owen. She subsequently became convinced of the use of the "biliteral cipher" in early Shakespeare printing, believing that the use of different printing fonts was an attempt to conceal messages concerning the authorship of the works and other statements about the secret history of the times. This type of cipher, also known as Bacon's cipher, had been discussed in Bacon's work. It depended on the use of two distinct typefaces within the same text to conceal messages.

Gallup came to this conclusion in 1895. In subsequent years she published a large body of literature claiming to have uncovered deciphered content in the work of Bacon, Shakespeare and others. Her first book was The Biliteral Cypher of Sir Francis Bacon Discovered in his Works and Deciphered by Mrs Elizabeth Wells Gallup, published in 1899, and then in multiple other editions into the 20th century.

In later years her work was largely sponsored by Colonel George Fabyan at his Riverbank Laboratories in Geneva, Illinois. Fabyan, who had also funded Owen's work, supported a research staff working on her theory, which initially included Elizebeth Smith (later Elizebeth Friedman). During Gallup's time at Riverbank she published many books containing decipherments of purported hidden messages in the work of Bacon and other writers. Her decipherments "discovered" that Bacon was the son of Queen Elizabeth, heir to the throne, and the author of the works of Christopher Marlowe, George Peele, and Robert Burton. Gallup also published the play The Tragedy of Anne Boleyn which was supposed to have been hidden in cipher-form in Bacon/Shakespeare's works.

None of Gallup's decoding assistants at Riverbank were ever able to duplicate her work. Elizebeth Smith Friedman, with her husband William F. Friedman, in 1957 published The Shakespearean Ciphers Examined, a careful study of the various Bacon/Shakespeare theories, including that of Gallup, and concluded that there was no evidence that the biliteral cipher was used in Shakespeare's works. The Friedmans illustrated that despite Gallup's theories, the range of type forms used in the printing of the works of Shakespeare conformed to the normal printing practices of the time, meaning many different fonts were used in an apparently haphazard manner. The Friedmans also reported that outside experts examined the letter fonts used in the printing of Shakespeare's plays and concluded that, with few exceptions, it was not possible to unambiguously separate them into two groups, as the Bacon biliteral cipher requires. The Friedmans pointed out that Gallup, in attempting to use Bacon's biliteral cipher to decode Shakespeare's works, had been able to take advantage of the variable fonts to give her great freedom in arbitrarily selecting most of the letters of her message, with the result that she found "what it was she was determined to find."
