= Bacon's cipher =

Steganography method

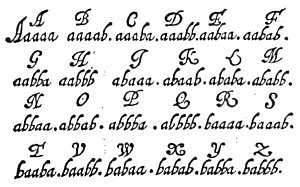
Image of Bacon's cipher.

Bacon's cipher or the Baconian cipher is a method of steganographic message encoding devised by Francis Bacon in 1605. In steganography, a message is concealed in the presentation of text, rather than its content. Baconian ciphers are categorized as both a substitution cipher (in plain code) and a concealment cipher (using the two typefaces).

== Cipher details ==
To encode a message, each letter of the plaintext is replaced by a group of five of the letters 'A' or 'B'. This replacement is a 5-bit binary encoding and is done according to the alphabet of the Baconian cipher (from the Latin Alphabet), shown below:

Letter	Code	Binary
A	aaaaa	00000
B	aaaab	00001
C	aaaba	00010
D	aaabb	00011
E	aabaa	00100
F	aabab	00101
G	aabba	00110
H	aabbb	00111
I, J	abaaa	01000
K	abaab	01001
L	ababa	01010
M	ababb	01011

Letter	Code	Binary
N	abbaa	01100
O	abbab	01101
P	abbba	01110
Q	abbbb	01111
R	baaaa	10000
S	baaab	10001
T	baaba	10010
U, V	baabb	10011
W	babaa	10100
X	babab	10101
Y	babba	10110
Z	babbb	10111

A second version of Bacon's cipher uses a unique code for each letter. In other words, I, J, U and V each have their own pattern in this variant:

Letter	Code	Binary
A	aaaaa	00000
B	aaaab	00001
C	aaaba	00010
D	aaabb	00011
E	aabaa	00100
F	aabab	00101
G	aabba	00110
H	aabbb	00111
I	abaaa	01000
J	abaab	01001
K	ababa	01010
L	ababb	01011
M	abbaa	01100

Letter	Code	Binary
N	abbab	01101
O	abbba	01110
P	abbbb	01111
Q	baaaa	10000
R	baaab	10001
S	baaba	10010
T	baabb	10011
U	babaa	10100
V	babab	10101
W	babba	10110
X	babbb	10111
Y	bbaaa	11000
Z	bbaab	11001

A third version is that 'a' starts off as 00001 or aaaab and so on.

Letter	Code	Binary
A	aaaab	00001
B	aaaba	00010
C	aaabb	00011
D	aabaa	00100
E	aabab	00101
F	aabba	00110
G	aabbb	00111
H	abaaa	01000
I	abaab	01001
J	ababa	01010
K	ababb	01011
L	abbaa	01100
M	abbab	01101

Letter	Code	Binary
N	abbba	01110
O	abbbb	01111
P	baaaa	10000
Q	baaab	10001
R	baaba	10010
S	baabb	10011
T	babaa	10100
U	babab	10101
V	babba	10110
W	babbb	10111
X	bbaaa	11000
Y	bbaab	11001
Z	bbaba	11010

The writer must make use of two different typefaces for this cipher. After preparing a false message with the same number of letters as all of the As and Bs in the real, secret message, two typefaces are chosen, one to represent As and the other Bs. Then each letter of the false message must be presented in the appropriate typeface, according to whether it stands for an A or a B.

To decode the message, the reverse method is applied. Each "typeface 1" letter in the false message is replaced with an A and each "typeface 2" letter is replaced with a B. The Baconian alphabet is then used to recover the original message.

Any method of writing the message that allows two distinct representations for each character can be used for the Bacon Cipher. Bacon himself prepared a Biliteral Alphabet for handwritten capital and small letters with each having two alternative forms, one to be used as A and the other as B. This was published as an illustrated plate in his De Augmentis Scientiarum (The Advancement of Learning).

Because any message of the right length can be used to carry the encoding, the secret message is effectively hidden in plain sight. The false message can be on any topic and thus can distract a person seeking to find the real message.

== Baconian cipher example ==
The word 'steganography', encoded with quotation marks, where standard text represents "typeface 1" and text in boldface represents "typeface 2":

To encode a message each letter of the plaintext is replaced by a group of five of the letters 'A' or 'B'.

The pattern of standard and boldface letters is:

ba aabbaa b aaabaaa abba aaaaaa bb aaa bbabaabba ba aaaaaaaa ab b baaab bb babb ab baa abbaabb 'b' bb 'b'.

This decodes in groups of five as

baaab(S) baaba(T) aabaa(E) aabba(G) aaaaa(A) abbaa(N) abbab(O) aabba(G) baaaa(R) aaaaa(A) abbba(P) aabbb(H) babba(Y) bbaaa bbaab bbbbb

where the last three groups, being unintelligible, are assumed not to form part of the message.

== Bacon and Shakespeare ==
Some proponents of the Baconian theory of Shakespeare authorship, such as Elizabeth Wells Gallup and François Cartier, have claimed that Bacon used the cipher to encode messages revealing his authorship in the First Folio. However, American cryptologists William and Elizebeth Friedman refuted the claims that the works of Shakespeare contain hidden ciphers that disclose Bacon's or any other candidate's secret authorship in their The Shakespeare Ciphers Examined (1957). Typographical analysis of the First Folio shows that a large number of typefaces were used, instead of the two required for the cipher, and that printing practices of the time would have made it impossible to transmit a message accurately.

The Friedmans' tombstone included a message in Bacon's cipher not spotted for many years.

== See also ==
- Baudot, a set of 5-bit codes for the English alphabet, used world-wide for teleprinter communications during most of the 20th century.
- Null Cipher, a related cipher.
