= E. Philip Howrey =

American economist (1937–2011)

- Born: December 1, 1937; Geneva, Illinois
- Died: June 17, 2011 (aged 73); Boulder, Colorado

Academic background
- Education: University of North Carolina at Chapel Hill (Ph.D.); Drake University (B.Sc.)

Academic work
- Discipline: Macroeconomics
- Institutions: University of Michigan; Princeton University
- Website: Information at IDEAS / RePEc

Eugene Philip Howrey (December 1, 1937 – June 17, 2011) was an American economist. He taught at the University of Michigan until 2005.

Born in Geneva, Illinois, Howrey was raised in Iowa, where he attended Fairfield High School and later Drake University. He earned his Ph.D. from the University of North Carolina at Chapel Hill.

Howrey died in a bicycle accident near Boulder, Colorado, in 2011.

== Selected publications ==
- Howrey, E. Philip; Klein, Lawrence R.; McCarthy, Michael D. (1974). "Notes on Testing the Predictive Performance of Econometric Models". International Economic Review. 15 (2): 366–383. doi:10.2307/2525865. JSTOR 2525865.
- Howrey, E. Philip (1978). "The Use of Preliminary Data in Econometric Forecasting". Review of Economics and Statistics. 60 (2): 193–200. doi:10.2307/1924972. JSTOR 1924972.
- Howrey, E. Philip; Hymans, Saul H. (1978). "The Measurement and Determination of Loanable-Funds Saving" (PDF). Brookings Papers on Economic Activity. 1978 (3): 655–685. doi:10.2307/3217954. JSTOR 3217954.
