= Geneva, Illinois =

- City
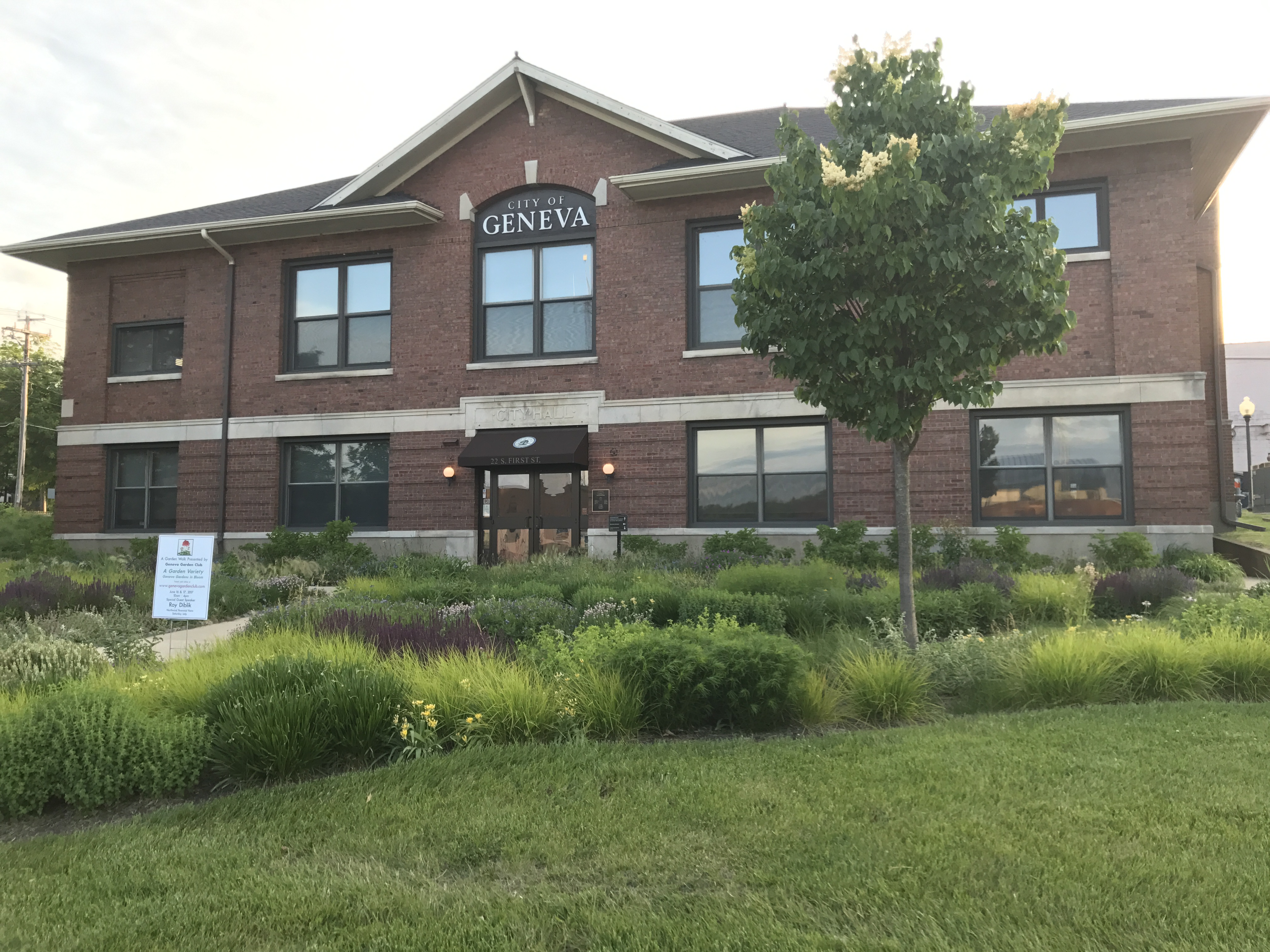
- Geneva City Hall as viewed from Illinois Route 31

- Flag Seal
- Interactive map of Geneva, Illinois
- Location within Illinois Location within the United States
- Coordinates: 41°53′00″N 88°19′27″W
- Country: United States
- State: Illinois
- County: Kane
- Township: Blackberry, Geneva, St. Charles
- Founded: 1835
- Incorporated as a village: 1867
- Incorporated as a city: 1887

Government
  - Type: Council-Manager
  - Mayor: Kevin Burns

Area
  - Total: 10.20 sq mi (26.43 km^{2})
  - Land: 9.97 sq mi (25.81 km^{2})
  - Water: 0.24 sq mi (0.62 km^{2})
- Elevation: 738 ft (225 m)

Population (2020)
  - Total: 21,393
  - Density: 2,146.7/sq mi (828.84/km^{2})
- Time zone: UTC-6 (CST)
  - Summer (DST): UTC-5 (CDT)
- ZIP Code: 60134
- Area codes: 630 and 331
- FIPS code: 17-28872
- GNIS feature ID: 2394875
- Website: geneva.il.us

Geneva is a city in and the county seat of Kane County, Illinois, United States. It is located in the far western side of the Chicago suburbs. Per the 2020 census, the population was 21,393.

Geneva is part of a tri-city area, located between St. Charles and Batavia. The area experienced rapid population growth from the late 1980s through the mid-2000s as the Chicago suburbs spread to the west.

Geneva is located along the Fox River. Portions of the Fox River Trail and the Illinois Prairie Path pass through Geneva. The Fabyan Windmill, a Dutch windmill dating from the 1850s, is located here.

== History ==
Two Native American trails crossed through Geneva. The Potawatomi people lived in the Geneva area, with their main chief, Waubonsie, leading a group that gathered just north of Aurora.

Geneva was first settled in the 1830s on an important route from Chicago. Daniel Shaw Haight was the first European settler in Geneva. Haight sold his claim in 1835 to James and Charity Herrington, who were influential in the creation of the town of Geneva. A local's connections with Col. Richard J. Hamilton, a prominent Cook County politician, led to the naming of Geneva as county seat in 1836. The town was platted a year later and was probably named after Geneva, New York. Before the name Geneva was chosen, the names LaFox, Big Spring, and Herrington's Ford were used. A courthouse and jail were among the first major works. Geneva was incorporated as a village in 1867. While its site as a county seat attracted attention, the village's location on the Fox River provided the most economic opportunities. Early goods manufactured in Geneva included cheese, butter, milled grains, and packed meat. The railroad connection in 1853 provided increased industry demand; by 1900, Appleton Manufacturing, Howell Foundry, Bennet Milling Co., and Pope Glucose Co. became major employers. This resulted in major civic improvement projects such as pumping stations and water mains in 1896. Geneva was particularly noted for its flux of Swedish immigrants, who comprised half the population by 1900. Geneva was connected to other Fox Valley communities a year later through the Aurora, Elgin and Fox River Electric Company.

== Geography ==
According to the 2021 census gazetteer files, Geneva has a total area of 10.20 square miles (26.42 km^{2}), of which 9.97 square miles (25.82 km^{2}) (or 97.67%) is land and 0.24 square miles (0.62 km^{2}) (or 2.33%) is water.

== Demographics ==
Historical population
Census	Pop.	Note	%±
1860	997		—
1880	1,239		—
1890	1,692		36.6%
1900	2,446		44.6%
1910	3,006		22.9%
1920	3,327		10.7%
1930	4,607		38.5%
1940	4,101		−11.0%
1950	5,139		25.3%
1960	7,646		48.8%
1970	9,049		18.3%
1980	9,881		9.2%
1990	12,617		27.7%
2000	19,515		54.7%
2010	21,495		10.1%
2020	21,393		−0.5%
U.S. Decennial Census

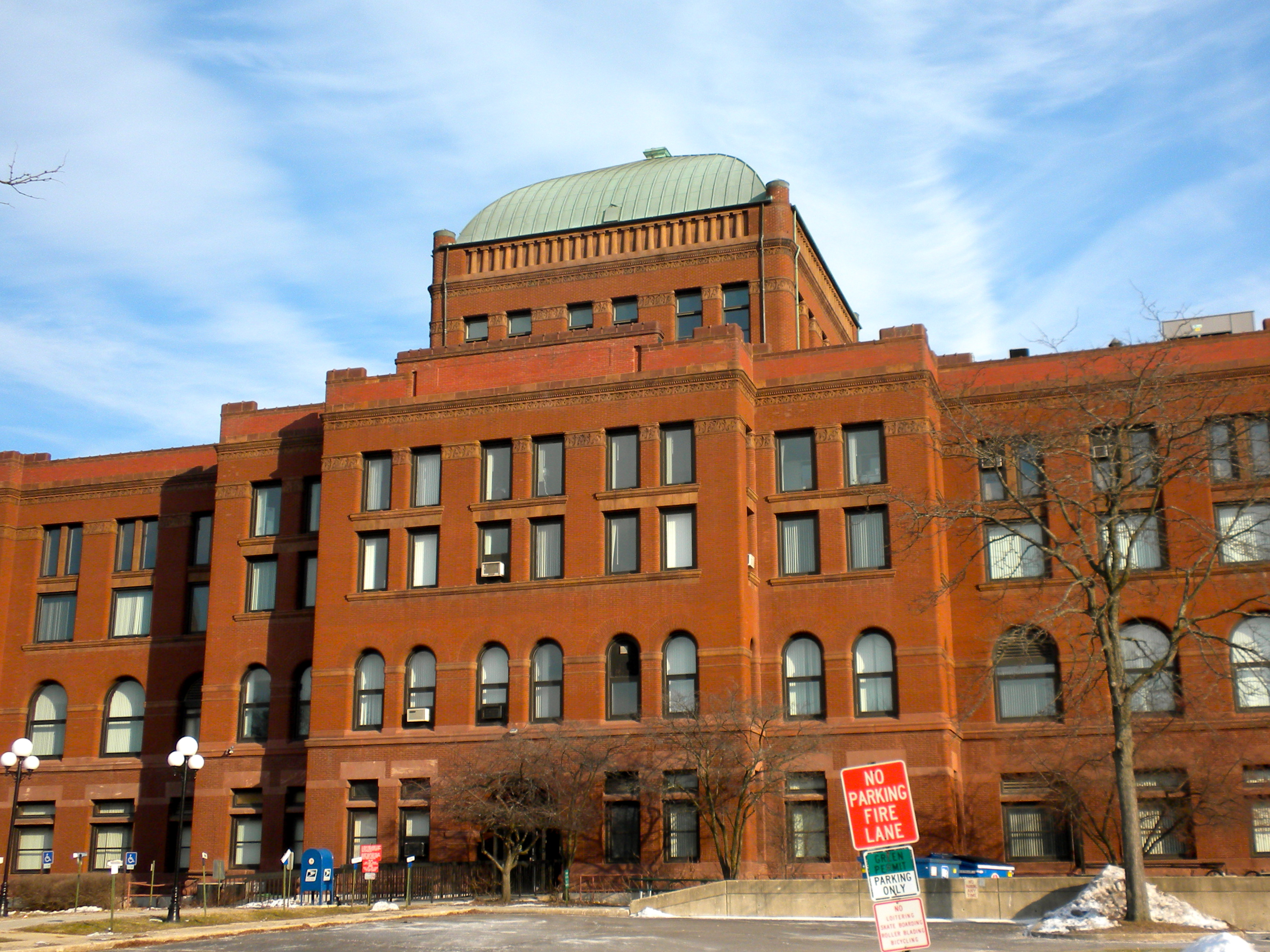
Kane County Courthouse

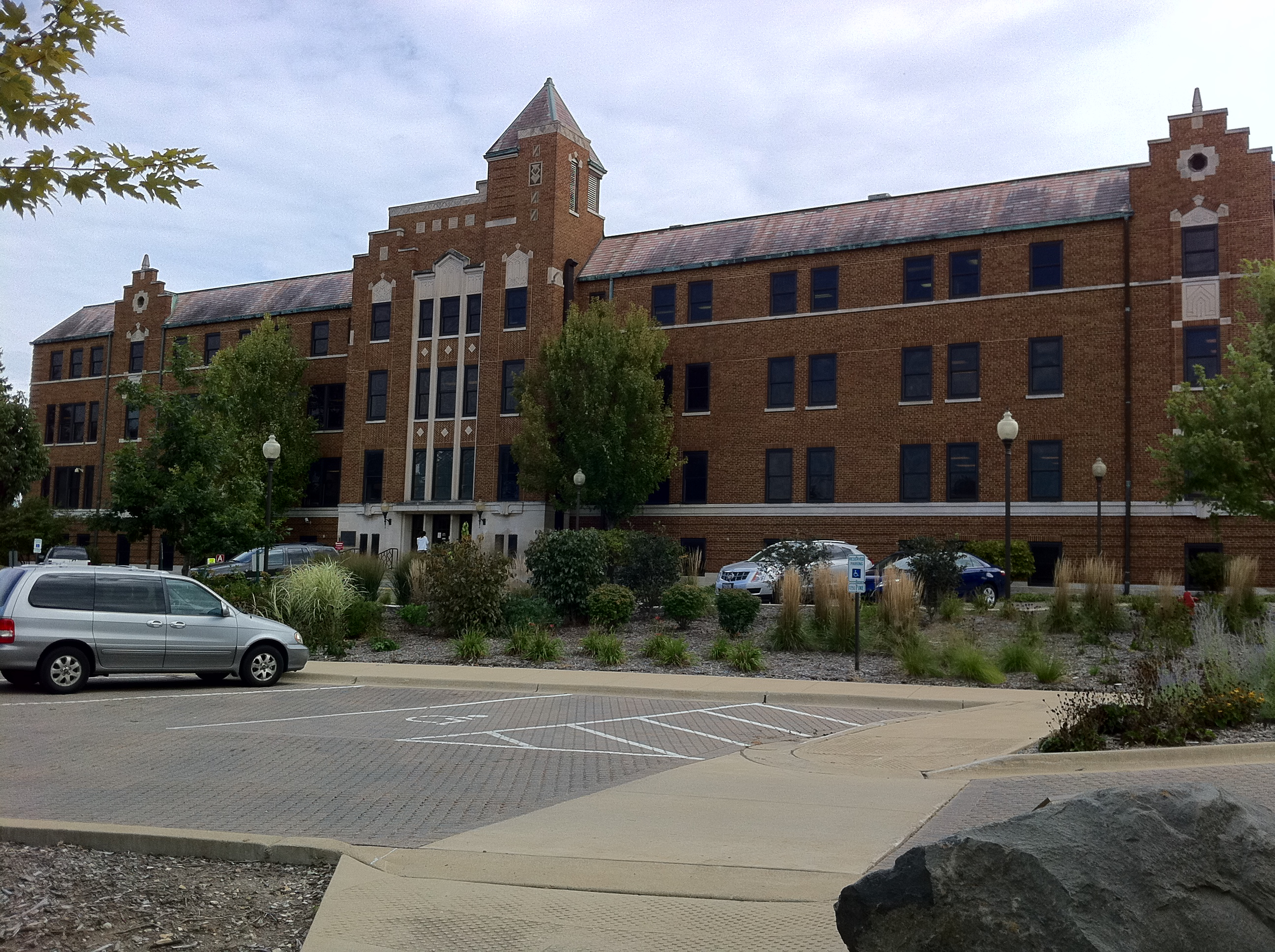
Kane County Government Center

=== Racial and ethnic composition ===
Geneva city, Illinois – Racial and ethnic composition Note: the US Census treats Hispanic/Latino as an ethnic category. This table excludes Latinos from the racial categories and assigns them to a separate category. Hispanics/Latinos may be of any race.
Race / Ethnicity (NH = Non-Hispanic)	Pop 2000	Pop 2010	Pop 2020	% 2000	% 2010	% 2020
White alone (NH)	18,436	19,651	18,392	94.47%	91.42%	85.97%
Black or African American alone (NH)	196	103	128	1.00%	0.48%	0.60%
Native American or Alaska Native alone (NH)	8	3	10	0.04%	0.01%	0.05%
Asian alone (NH)	244	461	485	1.25%	2.14%	2.27%
Native Hawaiian or Pacific Islander alone (NH)	4	3	3	0.02%	0.01%	0.01%
Other race alone (NH)	7	18	55	0.04%	0.08%	0.26%
Mixed race or Multiracial (NH)	79	213	758	0.40%	0.99%	3.54%
Hispanic or Latino (any race)	541	1,043	1,562	2.77%	4.85%	7.30%
Total	19,515	21,495	21,393	100.00%	100.00%	100.00%

=== 2020 census ===
As of the 2020 census, there were 21,393 people, 8,134 households, and 5,942 families residing in the city. The population density was 2,096.53 inhabitants per square mile (809.47/km^{2}). The median age was 43.8 years; 22.8% of residents were under the age of 18 and 17.5% were 65 years of age or older. For every 100 females there were 93.3 males, and for every 100 females age 18 and over there were 90.2 males age 18 and over.

99.9% of residents lived in urban areas, while 0.1% lived in rural areas.

Of the 8,134 households, 31.9% had children under the age of 18 living in them. About 63.2% were married-couple households, 10.8% were households with a male householder and no spouse or partner present, and 22.1% were households with a female householder and no spouse or partner present. Approximately 21.5% of all households were made up of individuals, and 11.1% had someone living alone who was 65 years of age or older.

There were 8,533 housing units, of which 4.7% were vacant. The homeowner vacancy rate was 1.4% and the rental vacancy rate was 8.1%.

Racial composition as of the 2020 census
Race	Number	Percent
White	18,732	87.6%
Black or African American	141	0.7%
American Indian and Alaska Native	57	0.3%
Asian	493	2.3%
Native Hawaiian and Other Pacific Islander	3	0.0%
Some other race	424	2.0%
Two or more races	1,543	7.2%
Hispanic or Latino (of any race)	1,562	7.3%

== Arts and culture ==
=== Historical sites ===
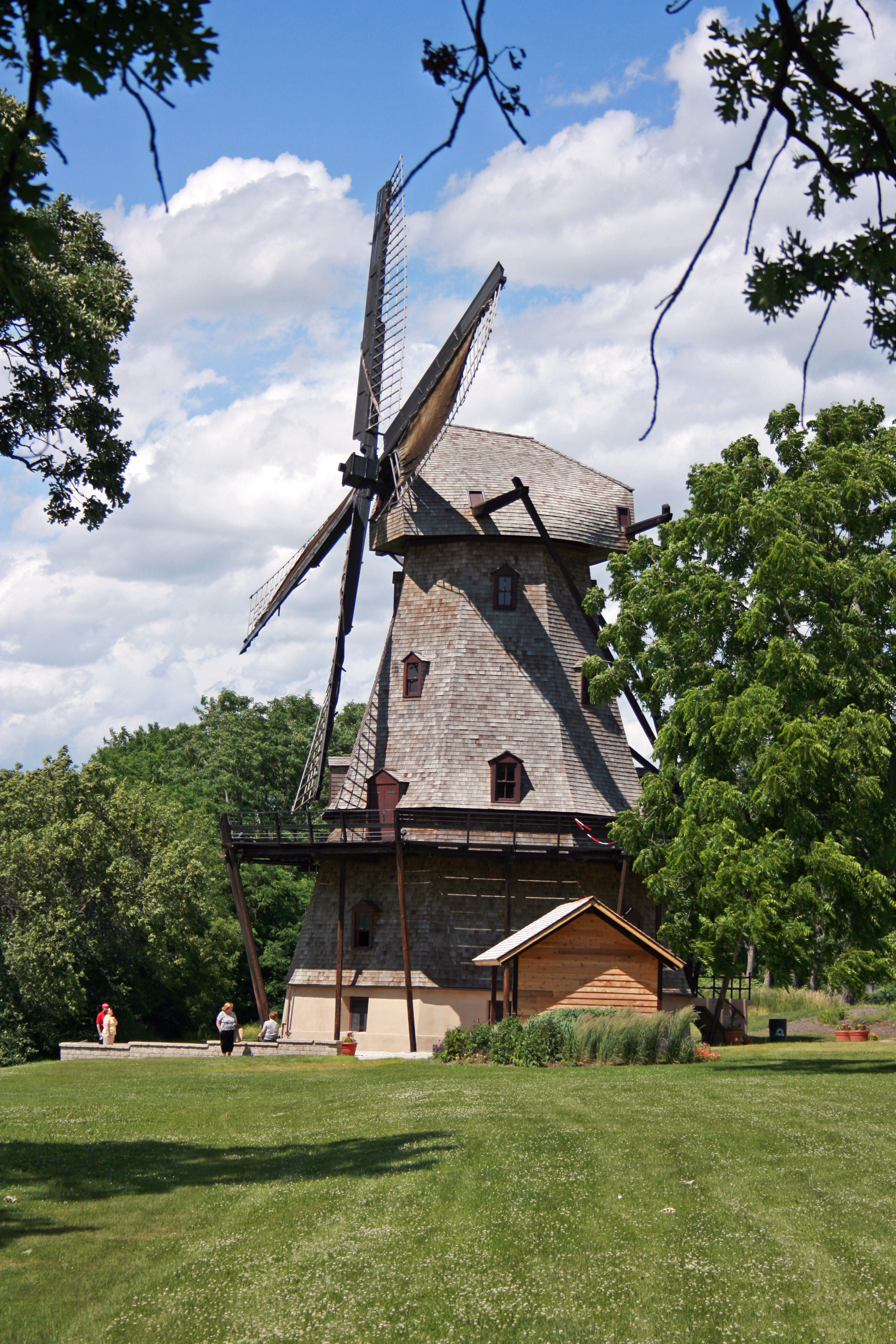
Fabyan Windmill

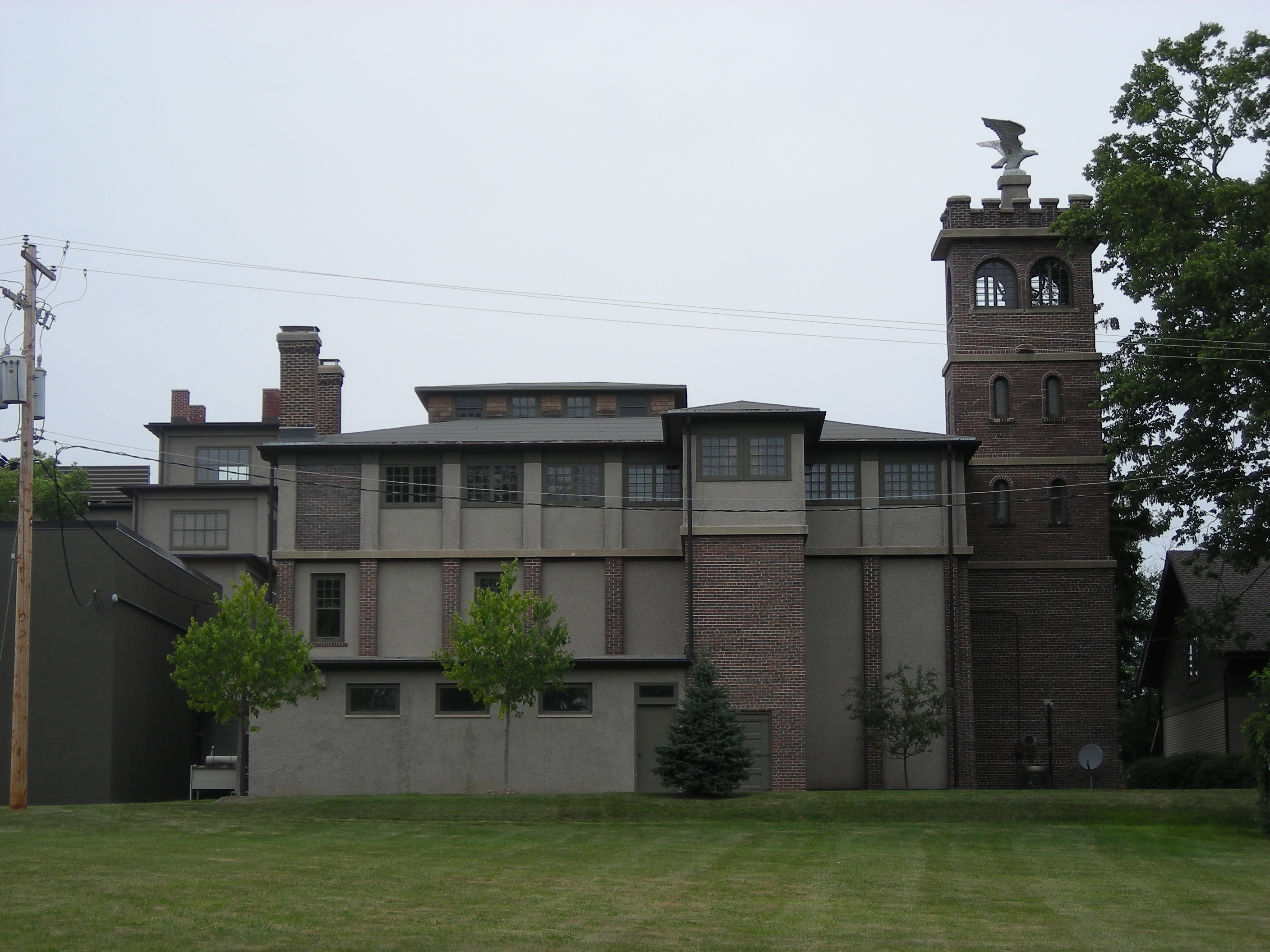
Riverbank Laboratories

Fabyan Windmill is an authentic, working Dutch windmill dating from the 1850s. The five-story wooden smock mill with a stage, which stands 68 feet (21 m) tall, sits upon the onetime estate of Colonel George Fabyan, but is now part of the Kane County Forest Preserve District. The windmill is listed on the National Register of Historic Places (NRHP).

Riverbank Laboratories is an acoustical testing agency founded by Wallace Clement Sabine in 1918. The acoustical laboratory building was funded and built by Colonel George Fabyan at his Fabyan Villa in Geneva. The facility housed a cryptology team that deciphered codes from the works of Sir Francis Bacon, Shakespeare, and enemy military communications. It was added to the National Register of Historic Places on November 28, 2003. The Fabyan Villa Museum houses photographs, the Fabyans' personal artifact collections, and original furnishings.

Sacred Heart Seminary Shrine is a stone and mosaic religious Chapel in Geneva. It is located near Sacred Heart Monastery. The shrine was established in 1925 when a piece of the land along the river was sold to the Society of Jesus.

Elizabeth Place, or the Henry Bond Fargo House, is a historic residence in Geneva, in the Mission Revival style. The house was owned by Henry Bond Fargo, a local businessman who brought several early industries to Geneva. It is listed on the NRHP.

A replica of Norway's Gokstad Viking Ship is located in Geneva's Good Templar Park. The replica was constructed between 1892 and 1893 for the 1893 Columbian Exposition in Chicago, and was on display in Lincoln Park before being relocated to Geneva.

== Sports ==
Geneva has been home to the Kane County Cougars since 1991 when the Wausau Timbers relocated from Wausau, Wisconsin. The Cougars currently play at Northwestern Medicine Field. Originally members of the Midwest League, Major League Baseball removed their affiliation status during the nationwide minor league reorganization. The Cougars joined the American Association of Professional Baseball. In 2015 the Chicago Steel of the United States Hockey League moved to Geneva from Bensenville, Illinois and played at Fox Valley Ice Arena. In 2023, the Steel franchise was purchased by the Wirtz Corporation, the owners of the Chicago Blackhawks.

== Education ==
Geneva School District 304 includes the following schools:

=== Elementary education schools ===
- Harrison Street Elementary School (built in 1929)
- Williamsburg Elementary School (built in 2008)
- Heartland Elementary School (built in 2002)
- Mill Creek Elementary School (built in 1996)
- Fabyan Elementary School (built in 2008)
- Western Avenue Elementary School (built in 1964)

=== Middle schools ===
- Geneva Middle School South (built in 1994)
- Geneva Middle School North (built in 2006)

=== High schools ===
- Geneva High School (built in 1958)

== Media ==
Movies filmed in Geneva include:

- Harry and Tonto (1974); filmed outside Geneva Courthouse and Geneva Motel.
- Road to Perdition (2002); filmed in downtown Geneva.
- Novocaine; filmed at Geneva Motel.
- The Resurrection of Gavin Stone; filmed at Dodson Place.

== Infrastructure ==
=== Transportation ===
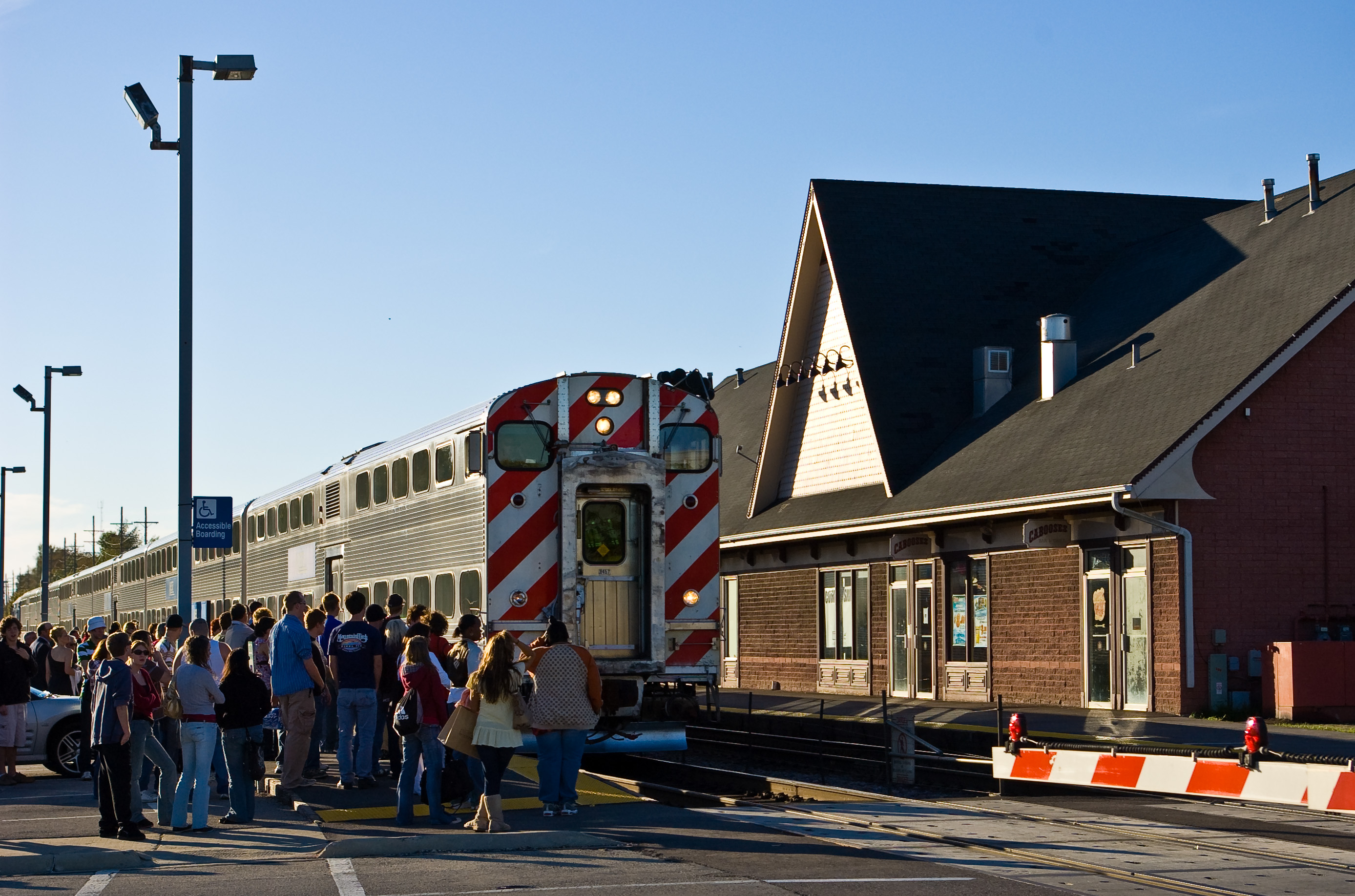
Geneva Metra Station

Highways include State Routes 25, 31, and 38.

Geneva is served by the Pace bus system.

Geneva Station is on the Union Pacific West Line of the Metra commuter rail system; it provides service to downtown Chicago.

== Notable people ==
Academia and science

- Elizebeth Smith Friedman (1892–1980), cryptanalyst and author
- E. Philip Howrey (1937–2011), economist and professor
- Edmund Beecher Wilson (1856–1939), American geneticist

Arts

- Gower Champion (1919–1980), theater director, choreographer and dancer
- Diego Cortez (1946–2021), filmmaker and art curator
- Niykee Heaton (born 1994), singer
- Wolfgang Hoffmann (1900–1969), architect
- Stu Linder (1931–2006), film editor
- Michael J. Nelson (born 1964), comedian and writer
- Joan Taylor (1929–2012), actress

Business

- George Fabyan, (1867–1936), businessman
- Jervis Langdon Jr., (1905-2004), railroad executive
- Dale Shewalter (1950–2010), educator

Media

- Sam Smith (born 1948), sportswriter
- Bob Woodward (born 1943), investigative journalist

Politics

- Steven Andersson (born 1964), politician
- James G. Fair (1831–1894), businessman and politician
- S. Louis Rathje (born 1939), judge
- Dan Ugaste, (Born 1963), politician
- Wayne Wallingford (born 1946), politician

Sports

- Varney Anderson (1886–1941), baseball player
- Sid Bennett (1895–1971), American football player
- Ben Kanute (born 1992), triathlete
- Kevin McDowell (born 1992), triathlete
- Gabby Perea (born 2002), artistic gymnast
- Bob Zeman (1939–2019), American football player
