= Riverbank Laboratories =

- Riverbank Labs, Riverbank Acoustical Laboratory
- Interactive map of Riverbank Laboratories
- Location: 627 Riverbank Dr. Geneva, Illinois

History
- Built: 1918
- Built by: Wallace Sabine, George Fabyan

Site notes
- Website: https://riverbankacoustics.com/

- Riverbank Laboratories
- U.S. National Register of Historic Places
- U.S. Historic district
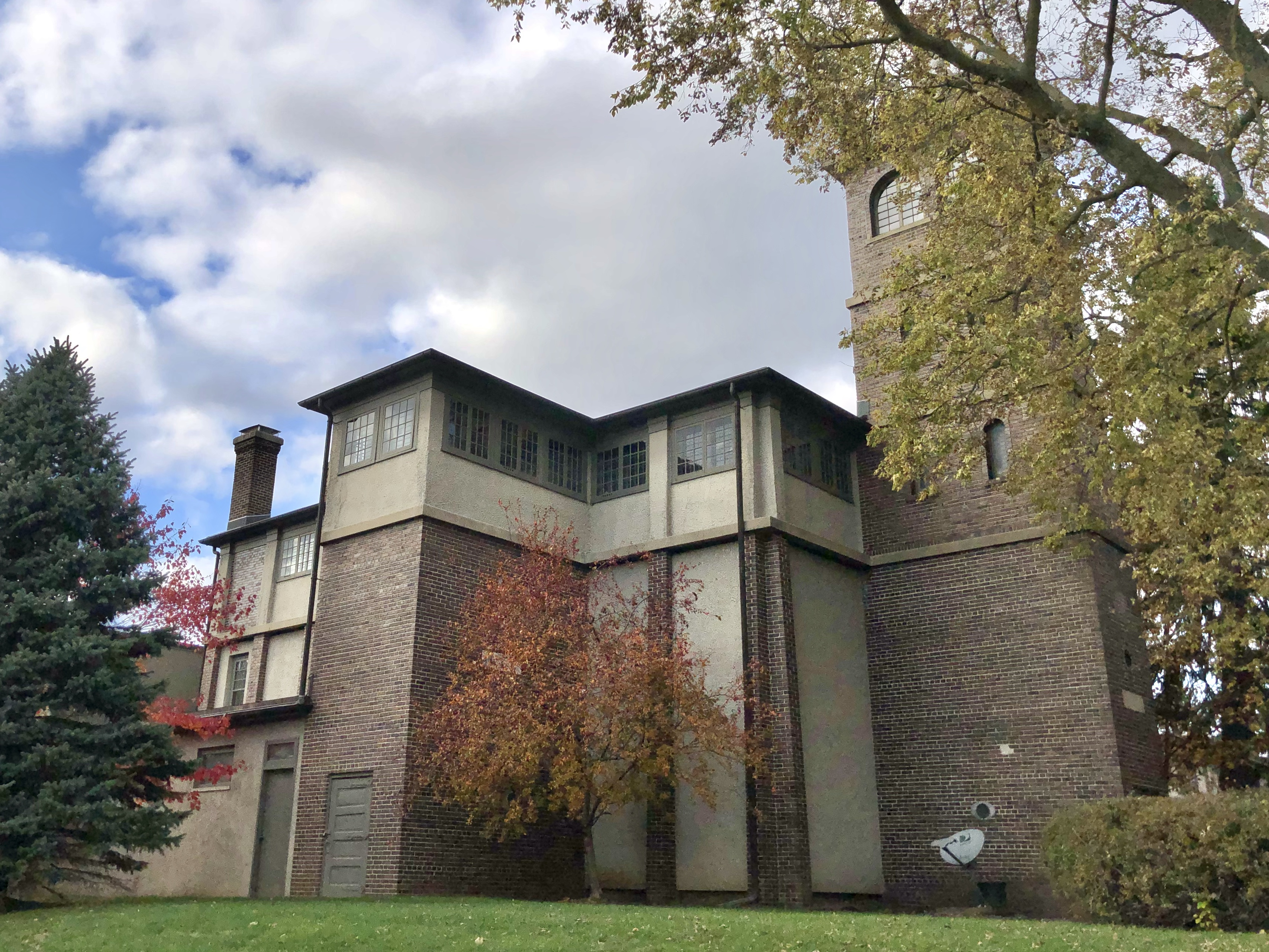

- Location within Illinois Location within the United States
- Location: 627 Riverbank Dr., Geneva, Illinois
- Area: 3.5 acres (1.4 ha)
- Built: 1912
- Architect: Wilson Brothers
- Architectural style: Bungalow/Craftsman
- NRHP reference No.: 03001204
- Added to NRHP: November 28, 2003

Riverbank Acoustical Laboratories (RAL), (often referred to as Riverbank or Riverbank Labs), is a NVLAP accredited acoustical testing agency founded by George Fabyan in 1913.

The testing service remains a highly respected source of independent acoustical materials testing. RAL specializes in STC (Sound Transmission Loss per ASTM E90), NRC (Sound Absorption per ASTM C423), IIC (Impact Sound Transmission per ASTM E492), and Sound Power (ISO 6926) testing. The current address for the company is 627 Riverbank Dr. Geneva, IL. This location also houses the Riverbank Acoustical Museum and Acoustical Library.

== History ==
The acoustical laboratory building was funded and built by Colonel George Fabyan on his vast Riverbank Estate in Geneva, Illinois. Colonel Fabyan was a patron of obscure sciences, and references to his "Riverbank laboratories" exist as early as 1916. In 1913, Fabyan hired Wallace Clement Sabine to help tune an acoustical levitation machine built according to specifications decoded from a Sir Francis Bacon work. Sabine ultimately convinced the colonel that the machine would never work, and the two became close friends. After hearing Sabine's complaints of the poor conditions of his acoustical test lab at Harvard, Colonel Fabyan agreed to build a state of the art reverberation chamber and test facility for Sabine to use on the property.

Sabine died in 1919, shortly after the lab was constructed. The task of managing the Laboratory Operations was granted to his cousin, Paul Sabine, who refined the test methods and developed the lab into a successful business. After Paul retired, the lab operations were handed to Hale Sabine and the Armour Research Foundation of the Illinois Institute of Technology. The Armour Research Foundation (ARF) was renamed IITRI in 1963. IITRI funded a large expansion to the laboratory in the 1960s, which included a new transmission loss facility. In 2002, the technology and engineering divisions of IITRI (Including Riverbank Acoustical Laboratories) were spun off into a new company named Alion Science and Technology. Today, Alion conducts advanced acoustical testing operations in the facility for many prominent acoustical material manufacturers and government agencies.

In the facility's early days, it also housed a cryptology team that worked to decipher codes from the works of Sir Francis Bacon, Shakespeare, and enemy military communications. Fabyan allowed the U.S. Government to use Riverbank Laboratories to their disposal during World War I and German and Mexican codes were deciphered there. Much of the cryptanalysis was done by William and Elizebeth Friedman. In 1993, the National Security Agency (NSA) recognized the work with a plaque reading "To the Memory of George Fabyan From a Grateful Government: In recognition of the voluntary and confidential service rendered by Colonel Fabyan and his Riverbank Laboratories in the sensitive areas of cryptanalysis and cryptologic training during a critical time of national need on the eve of America's entry into World War I." The building is recognized in the National Register of Historic Places.

== Notable staff ==
- William F. Friedman
- Elizebeth Smith Friedman
- Agnes Meyer Driscoll
- Wallace Clement Sabine
- Elizabeth Wells Gallup

== Gallery ==
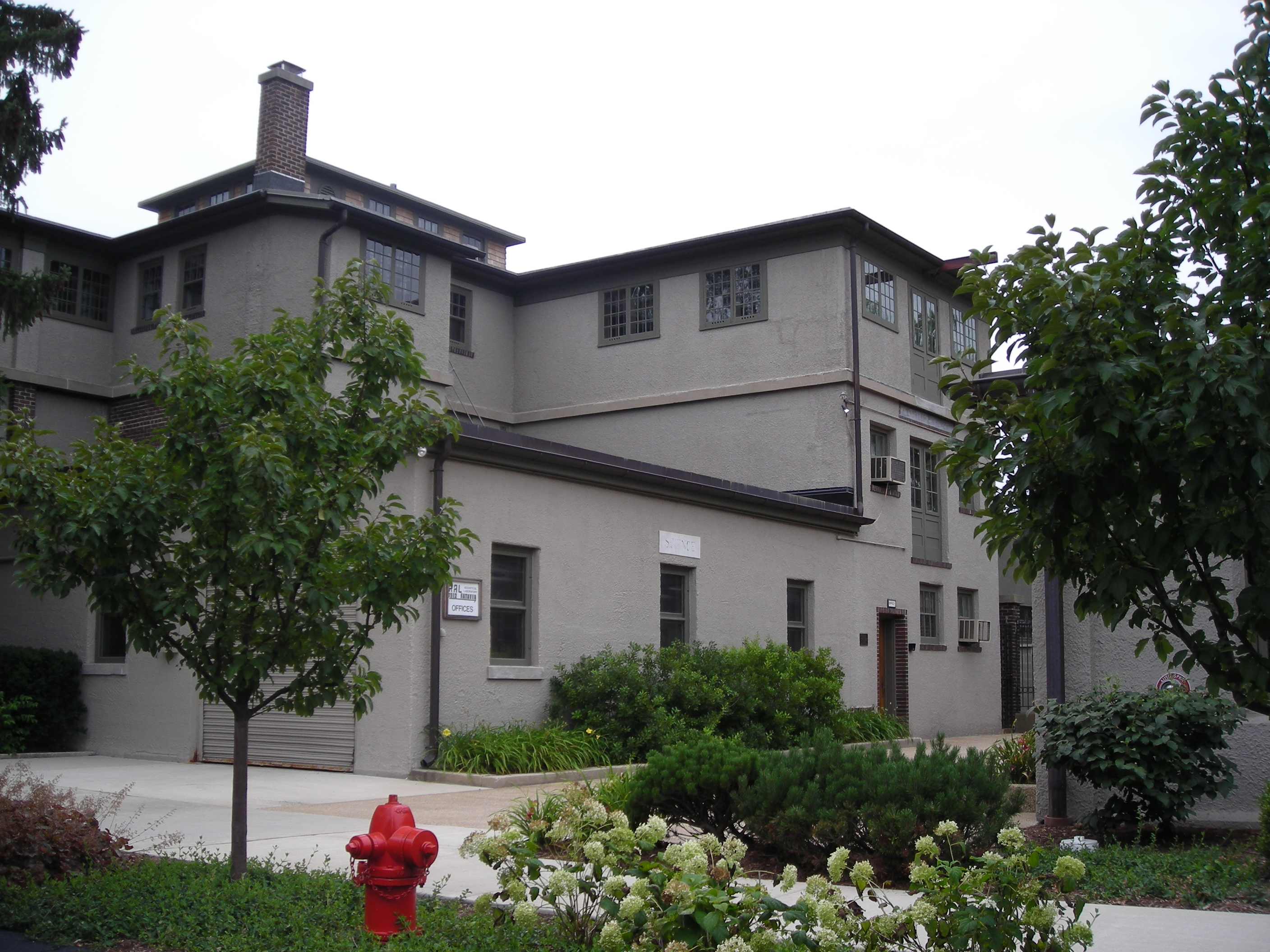

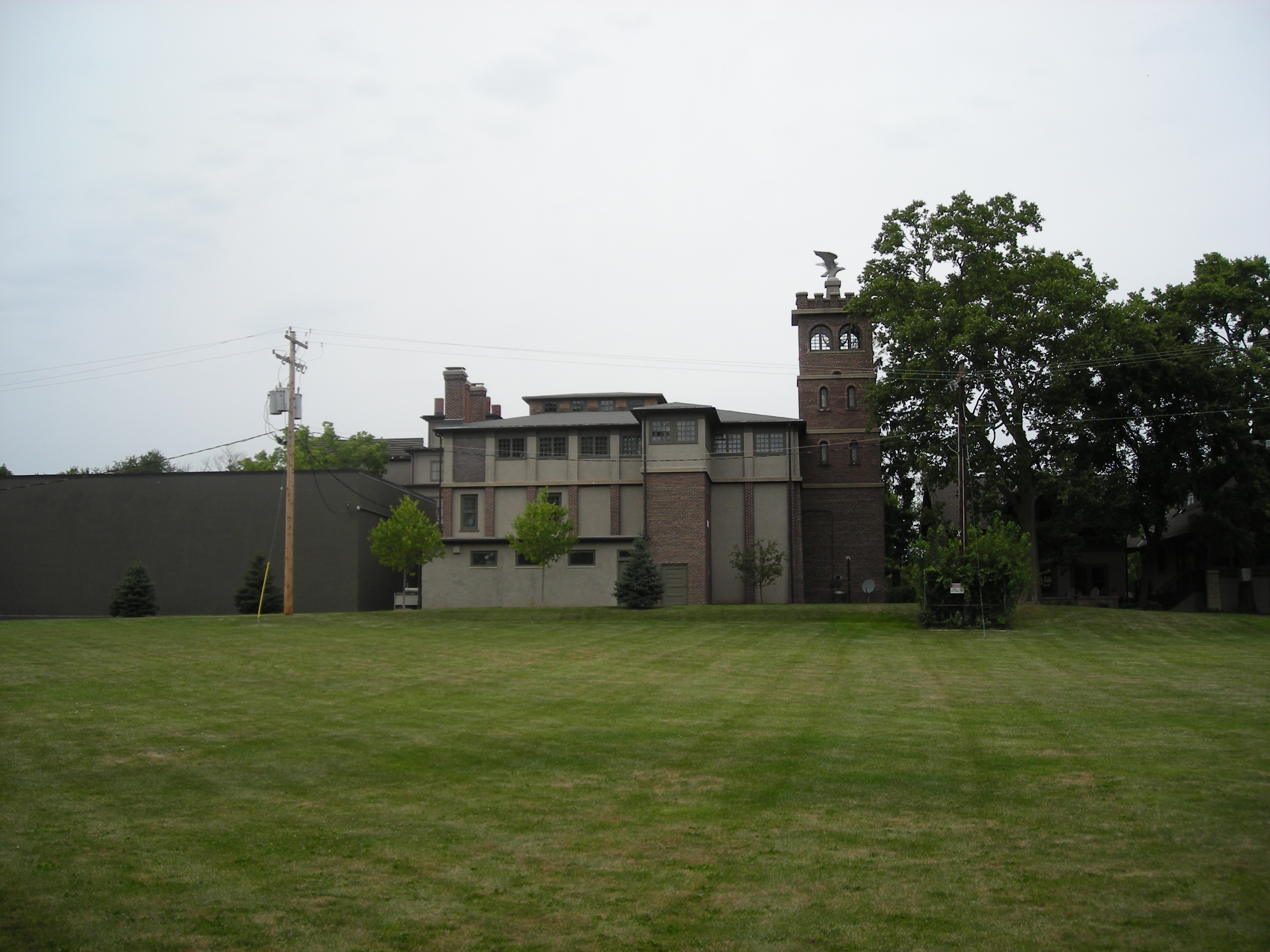

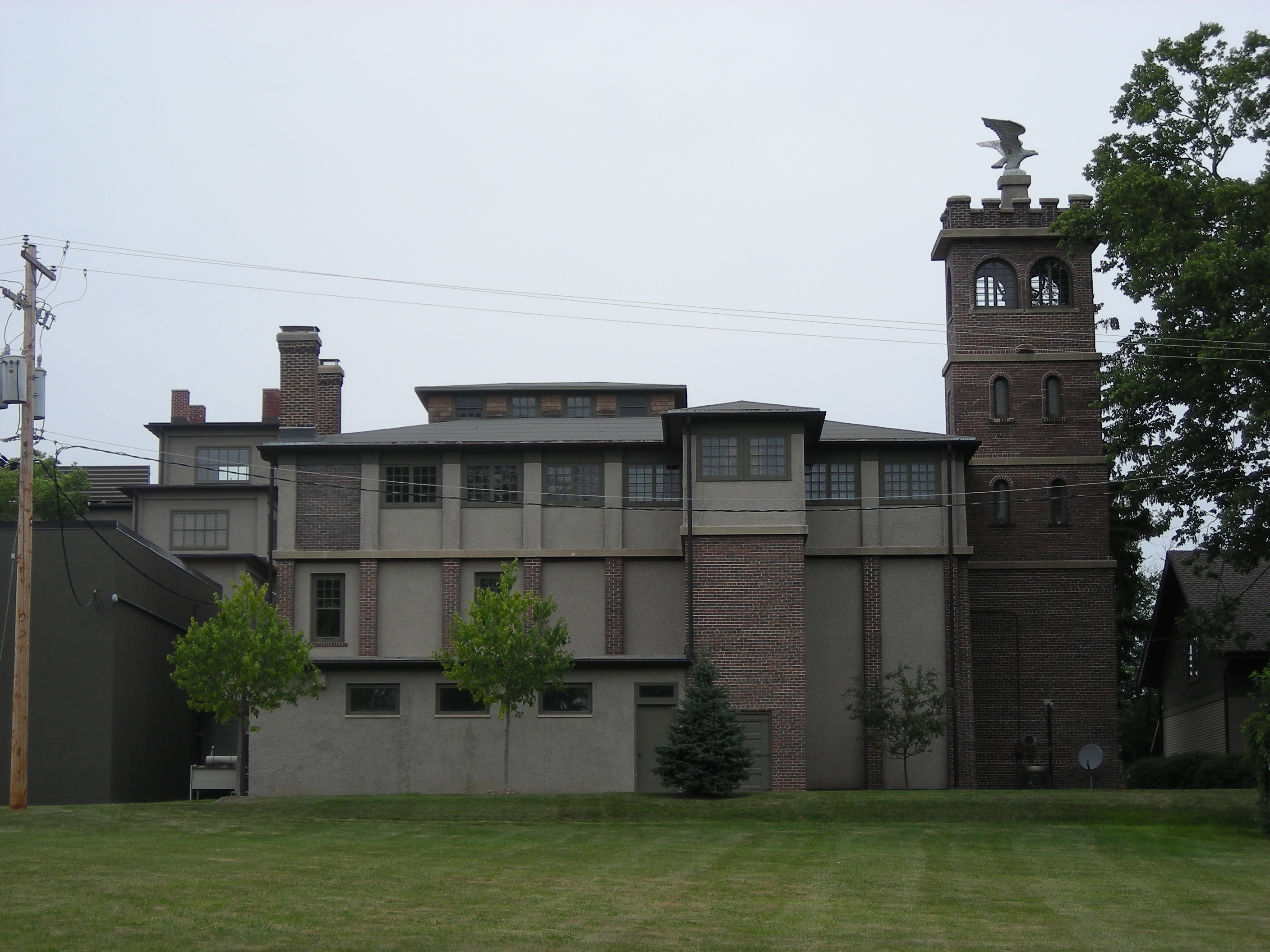

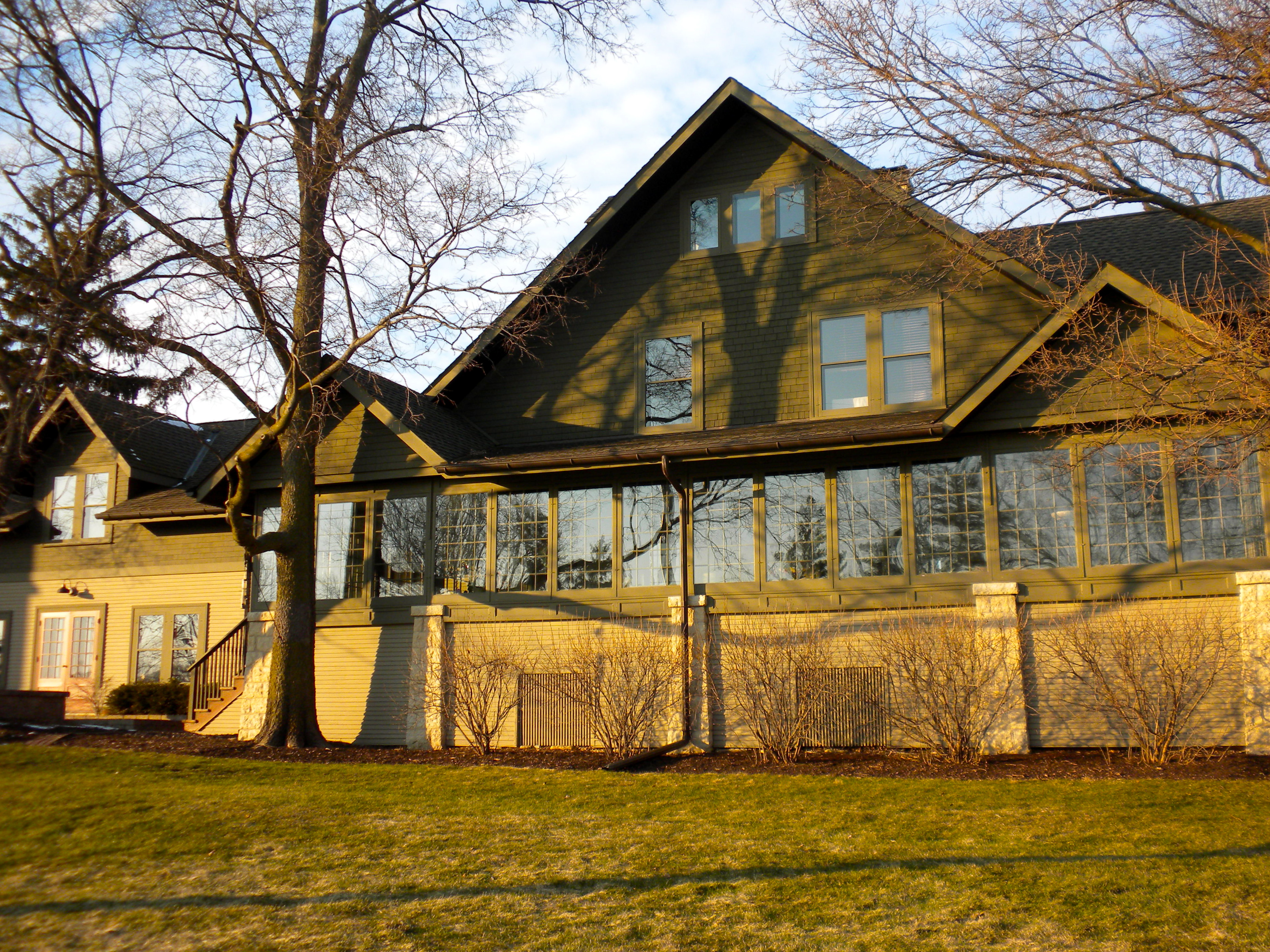
