= York Center, Illinois =

- Unincorporated community
- Location within Illinois Location within the United States
- Coordinates: 41°51′25″N 87°59′16″W
- Country: United States
- State: Illinois
- County: DuPage
- Township: York
- Elevation: 722 ft (220 m)
- Time zone: UTC-6 (Central (CST))
  - Summer (DST): UTC-5 (CDT)
- ZIP code: 60148 (Lombard)
- Area codes: 630 & 331
- GNIS feature ID: 422172

York Center is an unincorporated community in York Township, DuPage County, Illinois, United States. York Center is located by Meyers Road and 16th Street, near the southern border of Lombard, and the western border of Oakbrook Terrace. York Center has an elementary school, established in 1958, and a fire protection district, which covers unincorporated areas of Lombard, Villa Park, Oak Brook, and Oakbrook Terrace.

The York Center Cooperative (Co-op) community was founded immediately after World War II as a co-op on the principles of shared ownership "to promote and develop good will, high moral values, wholesome cooperative activities and healthy civic spirit." The Rochdale Principles were formative and the main road around the community was named Rochdale Circle. Louis Shirky, who also established a Church of the Brethren in York Center, purchased the Goltermann farm for the housing cooperative. At its founding, the co-op was an experiment in what was then considered radical living. Chicagoans who wanted to escape the prejudice and confinement of the city to build affordable homes in the suburbs flocked to what was then a bucolic farm, which the people of the co-op purchased and subdivided. Members learned to tout the 100 acres of communally-owned property as an economically mixed community that was tolerant of all races, religions and ethnicities. Many, but not all, of early residents, including Louis Shirky, were members of the York Center Church of the Brethren. The purpose was to establish a new kind of community, a housing cooperative based on open membership "to all persons of good will."

Archivist Dennis Bilger of the Harry S. Truman Presidential Library and Museum, has stated, "It is probably true that the York Center Cooperative was, if not the first, one of the very earliest integrated housing developments in the United States." In 1949, President Harry Truman issued an executive order declaring racial discrimination illegal in the granting of Federal Housing Administration loans. The watershed edict came after York Center Co-op members teamed up with the NAACP in a test case.

Girl Scouting was an important aspect of life in York Center. The Girl Scouts of Greater Chicago and Northwest Indiana now serves the area which was led by R. Hopley "Hop" Roberts in the days when it was part of the DuPage County Council.

The York Center Cooperative was legally dissolved in 2010.

In 2021, the Lombard Historical Society produced the documentary, Common Good ~ The York Center Co-op Story, which is characterized as "An epic tale of a pioneering, faith-based effort that provided fair housing, community and opportunity in an era of white flight, redlining and restrictive covenants that effectively prevented non-white Americans from fully participating in the American dream."
