= William F. Friedman =

American cryptologist (1891–1969)

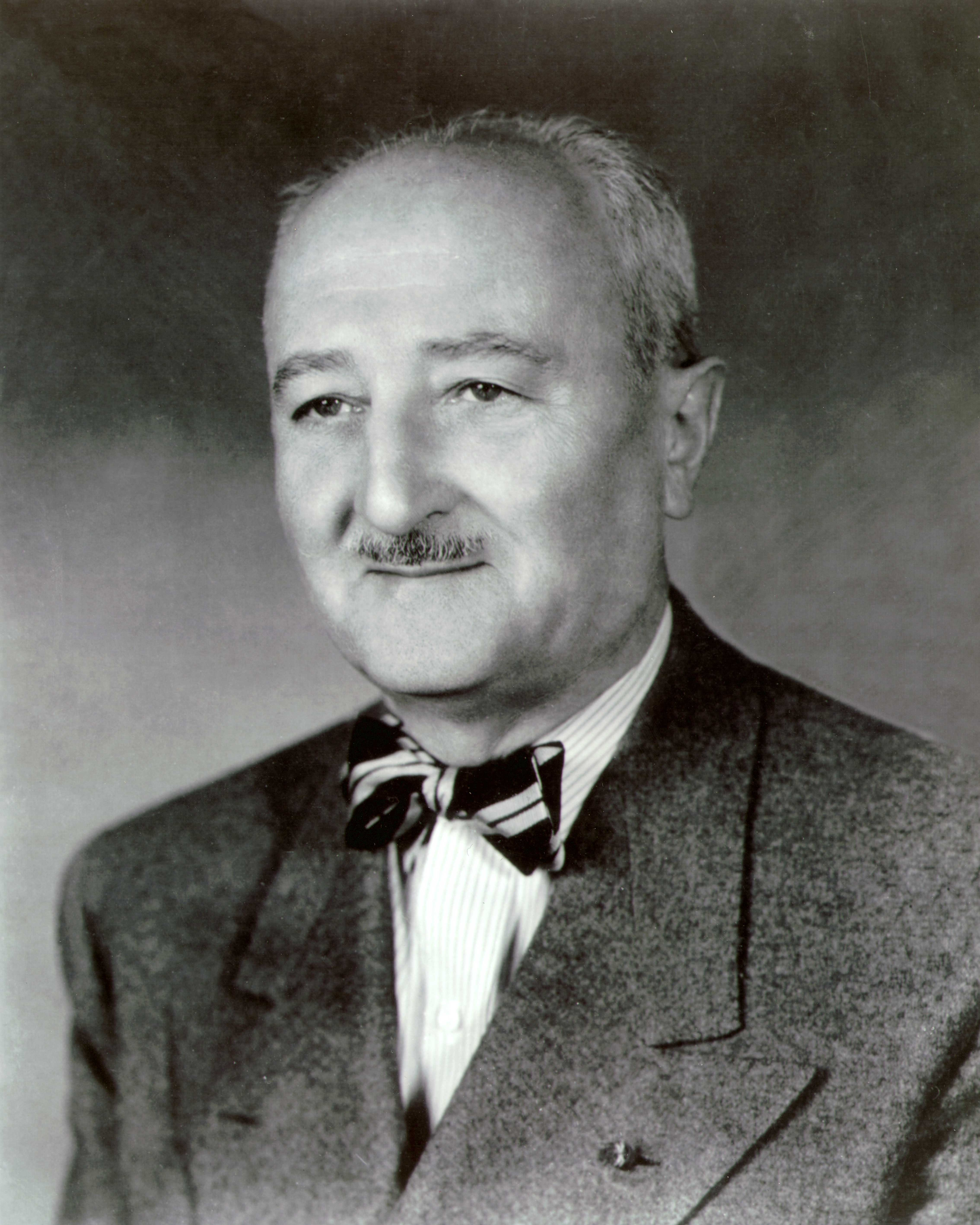
- Born: Wolf Friedman; September 24, 1891; Kishinev, Kishinyovsky Uyezd, Bessarabia Governorate, Russian Empire
- Died: November 2, 1969 (aged 78); Washington, D.C., United States
- Spouse: Elizebeth Smith Friedman
- Children: 2
- Engineering career
- Significant advance: cryptologist

William Frederick Friedman (September 24, 1891 – November 2, 1969) was a US Army cryptographer who ran the research division of the Army's Signal Intelligence Service (SIS) in the 1930s, and parts of its follow-on services into the 1950s. In 1940, subordinates of his led by Frank Rowlett broke Japan's PURPLE cipher, thus disclosing Japanese diplomatic secrets before America's entrance into World War II.

== Early life ==
Friedman was born Wolf Friedman (Yiddish: װאָלף פֿרידמאַן, Russian: Вольф Ф. Фридман), in Kishinev, Bessarabia, the son of Frederick Friedman, a Jew from Bucharest who worked as a translator and linguist for the Russian Postal Service, and the daughter of a well-to-do wine merchant. Friedman's family left Kishinev in 1892 on account of anti-Semitic persecution, ending up in Pittsburgh, Pennsylvania. Three years later, his first name was changed to William.

As a child, Friedman was introduced to cryptography in the short story "The Gold-Bug" by Edgar Allan Poe. He studied at the Michigan Agricultural College (known today as Michigan State University) in East Lansing and received a scholarship to work on genetics at Cornell University. Meanwhile, George Fabyan, who ran a private research laboratory to study any personally interesting project, decided to set up his own genetics project and was referred to Friedman. Friedman joined Fabyan's Riverbank Laboratories outside Chicago in September 1915. As head of the Department of Genetics, one of the projects he ran studied the effects of moonlight on crop growth, and so he experimented with the planting of wheat during various phases of the moon.

== Initial work in cryptology ==
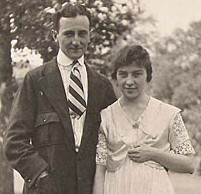
William and Elizebeth Friedman, recently married, at Riverbank in 1917

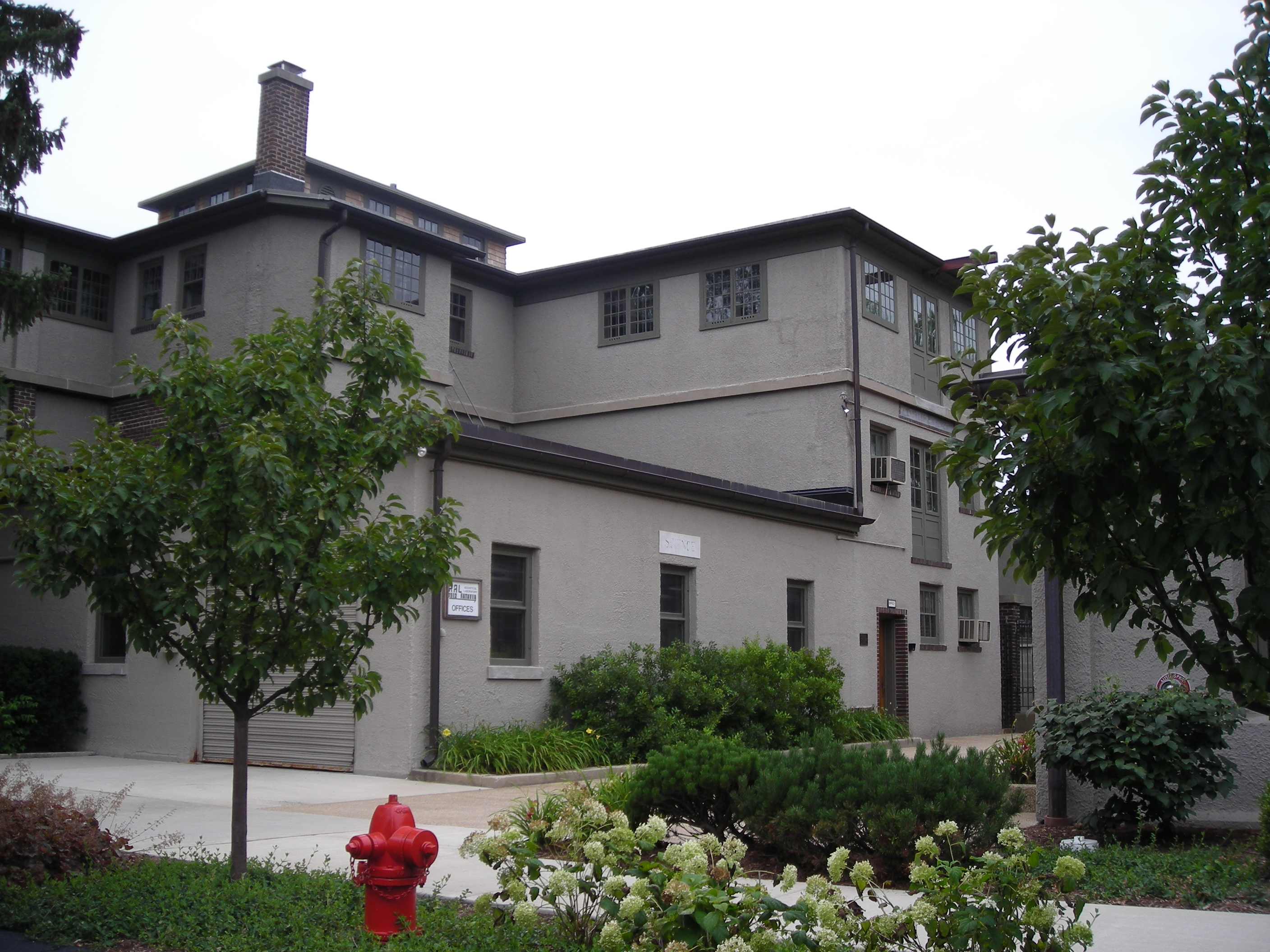
Riverbank Laboratories

Another of Fabyan's pet projects was research into secret messages which Sir Francis Bacon had allegedly hidden in various texts during the reigns of Elizabeth I and James I. The research was carried out by Elizabeth Wells Gallup. She believed that she had discovered many such messages in the works of William Shakespeare, and convinced herself that Bacon had written many, if not all, of Shakespeare's works. Friedman had become something of an expert photographer while working on his other projects, and was asked to travel to England on several occasions to help Gallup photograph historical manuscripts during her research. He became fascinated with the work as he courted Elizebeth Smith, Gallup's assistant and an accomplished cryptographer. They married, and he soon became director of Riverbank's Department of Codes and Ciphers as well as its Department of Genetics. During this time, Friedman wrote a series of eight papers on cryptography, collectively known as the "Riverbank Publications", including the first description of the index of coincidence, an important mathematical tool in cryptanalysis.

With the entry of the United States into World War I, Fabyan offered the services of his Department of Codes and Ciphers to the government. No Federal department existed for this kind of work (although both the Army and Navy had had embryonic departments at various times), and soon Riverbank became the unofficial cryptographic center for the US Government. During this period, the Friedmans broke a code used by German-funded Indian radicals in the US who planned to ship arms to India to gain independence from Britain. Analyzing the format of the messages, Riverbank realized that the code was based on a dictionary of some sort, a cryptographic technique common at the time. The Friedmans soon managed to decrypt most of the messages, but only long after the case had come to trial did the book itself come to light: a German-English dictionary published in 1880.

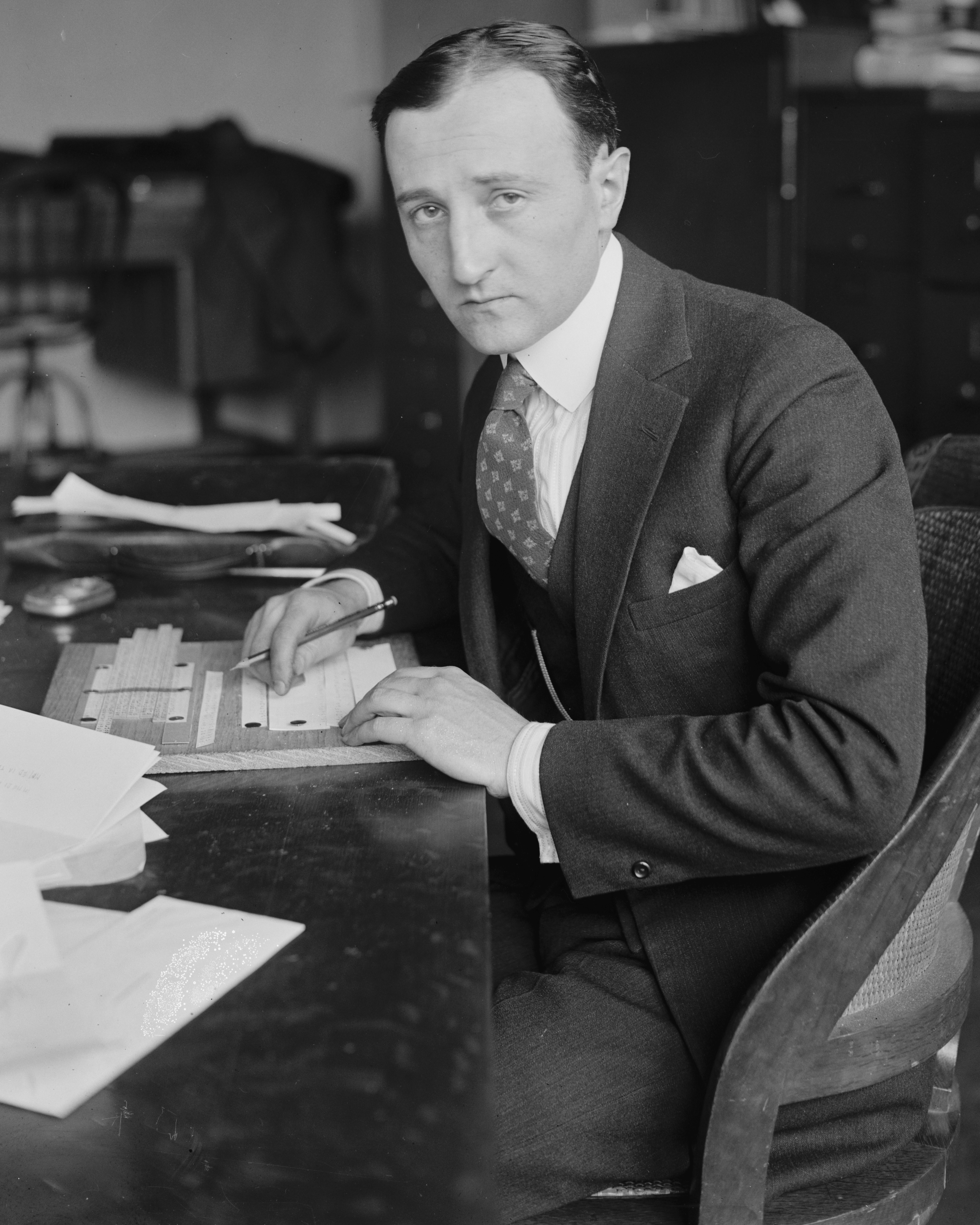
W. F. Friedman in 1924

== Signals Intelligence Service ==
The United States government decided to set up its own cryptological service, and sent Army officers to Riverbank to train under Friedman. To support the program, Friedman wrote a series of technical monographs, completing seven by early 1918. He then enlisted in the Army and went to France to serve as the personal cryptographer for General John J. Pershing. He returned to the US in 1920 and published an eighth monograph, "The Index of Coincidence and its Applications in Cryptography", considered by some to be the most important publication in modern cryptography to that time. His texts for Army cryptographic training were well thought of and remained classified for several decades.

In 1921 he became chief cryptanalyst for the War Department and later led the Signals Intelligence Service (SIS)—a position he kept for a quarter century. In 1929, after the American Black Chamber in New York City was disbanded, its files were entrusted to SIS, and the cryptographic and intelligence services was reorganized to suit its new position at the War Department.

Friedman coined several terms, including "cryptanalysis", and wrote many monographs on cryptography. One of these (written mostly in his spare time) was the first draft of his Elements of cryptanalysis, which later was expanded to four volumes and became the U.S. Army's cryptographic main textbook and reference. Realizing that mathematical and language skills were essential to SIS's work, Friedman managed to get authority to hire three men with both mathematical training and language knowledge. They were Solomon Kullback, Frank Rowlett and Abraham Sinkov, each of whom went on to distinguished service for decades. In addition he also was finally able to hire a man fluent in Japanese, John Hurt.

During this period Elizebeth Smith Friedman continued her own work in cryptology, and became famous in a number of trials involving rum-runners and the Coast Guard and FBI during Prohibition.

== Solution of cipher machines ==
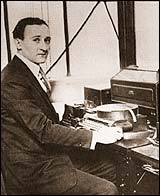
Friedman with an AT&T cipher machine

During the 1920s, several new cipher machines were developed generally based on using typewriter mechanics and basic electrical circuitry. An early example was the Hebern Rotor Machine, designed in the US in 1915 by Edward Hebern. This system offered such security and simplicity of use that Hebern heavily promoted it to investors.

Friedman realized that the new rotor machines would be important, and devoted some time to analyzing Hebern's design. Over a period of years, he developed principles of analysis and discovered several problems common to most rotor-machine designs. Examples of some dangerous features which allowed cracking of the generated code included having rotors step one position with each keypress, and putting the fastest rotor (the one that turns with every keypress) at either end of the rotor series. In this case, by collecting enough ciphertext and applying a standard statistical method known as the kappa test, he showed that he could, albeit with great difficulty, crack any cipher generated by such a machine.

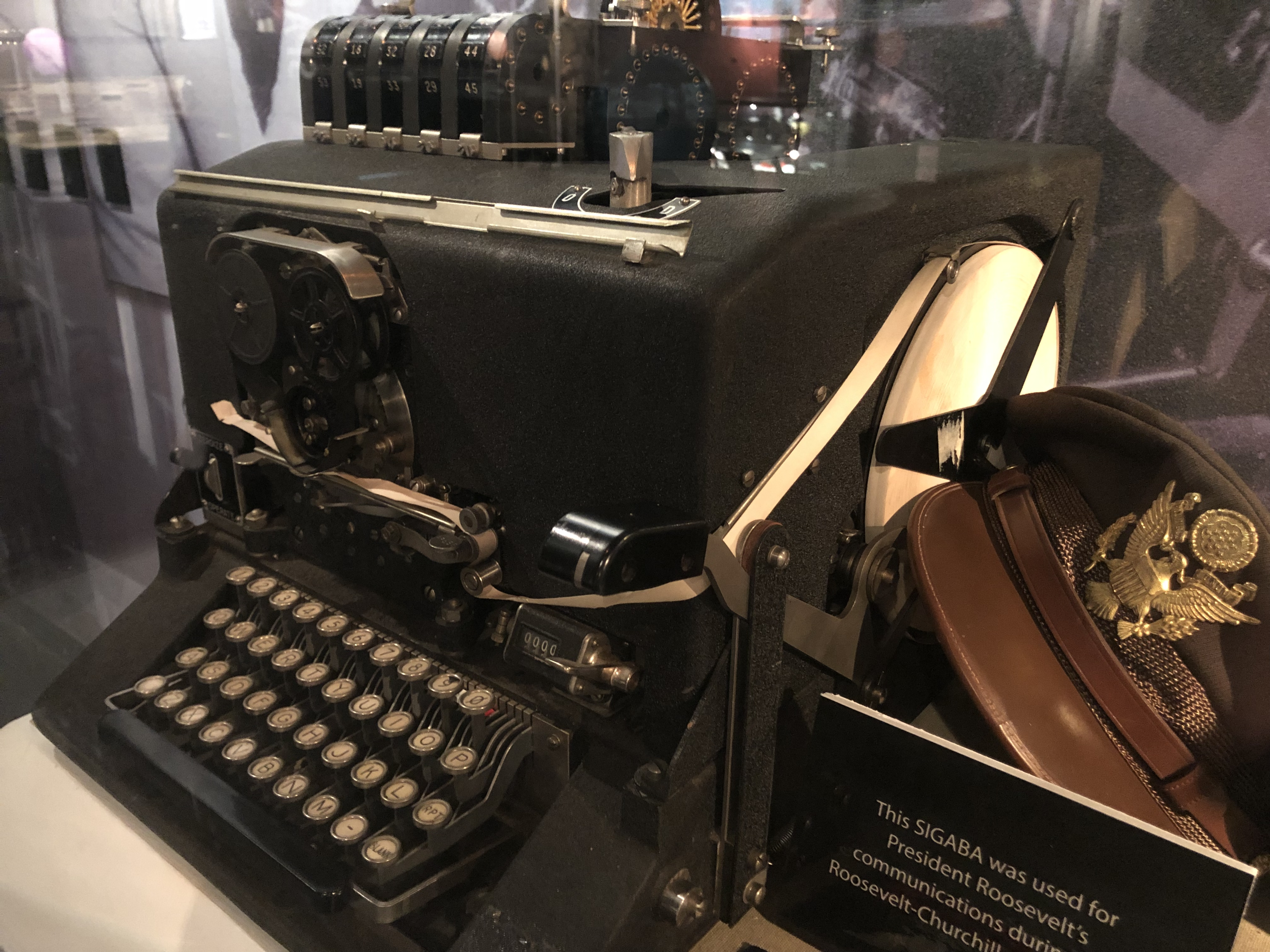
SIGABA cipher machine

Friedman used his understanding of rotor machines to develop several that were immune to his own attacks. The best of the lot was the SIGABA—which was destined to become the US's highest-security cipher machine in World War II after improvements by Frank Rowlett and Laurance Safford. Just over 10,000 were built. A patent on SIGABA was filed at the end of 1944, but kept secret until 2001, long after Friedman had died, when it was finally issued as U.S. patent 6,175,625.

In 1939, the Japanese introduced a new cipher machine for their most sensitive diplomatic traffic, replacing an earlier system that SIS referred to as "RED." The new cipher, which SIS called "PURPLE", was different and much more difficult. The Navy's cryptological unit (OP-20-G) and the SIS thought it might be related to earlier Japanese cipher machines, and agreed that SIS would handle the attack on the system. After several months trying to discover underlying patterns in PURPLE ciphertexts, an SIS team led by Friedman and Rowlett, in an extraordinary achievement, figured it out. PURPLE, unlike the German Enigma or the Hebern design, did not use rotors but stepper switches like those in automated telephone exchanges. Leo Rosen of SIS built a machine using—as was later discovered—the identical model of switch that the Japanese designer had chosen.

Thus, by the end of 1940, SIS had constructed an exact analog of the PURPLE machine without ever having seen one. With the duplicate machines and an understanding of PURPLE, SIS could decrypt increasing amounts of Japanese traffic. One such intercept was the message to the Japanese Embassy in Washington, D.C., ordering an end (on December 7, 1941) to negotiations with the US. The message gave a clear indication of impending war, and was to have been delivered to the US State Department only hours prior to the attack on Pearl Harbor. The controversy over whether the US had foreknowledge of the Pearl Harbor attack has roiled well into the 21st century.

In 1941, Friedman was hospitalized with a "nervous breakdown", widely attributed to the mental strain of his work on PURPLE. While he remained in hospital, a four-man team—Abraham Sinkov and Leo Rosen from SIS, and Lt. Prescott Currier and Lt. Robert Weeks from the U.S. Navy's OP-20-G—visited the British establishment at the "Government Code and Cypher School" at Bletchley Park. They gave the British a PURPLE machine, in exchange for details on the design of the Enigma machine and on how the British decrypted the Enigma cipher. However Friedman visited Bletchley Park in April 1943 and played a key role in drawing up the 1943 BRUSA Agreement.

== National Security Agency ==
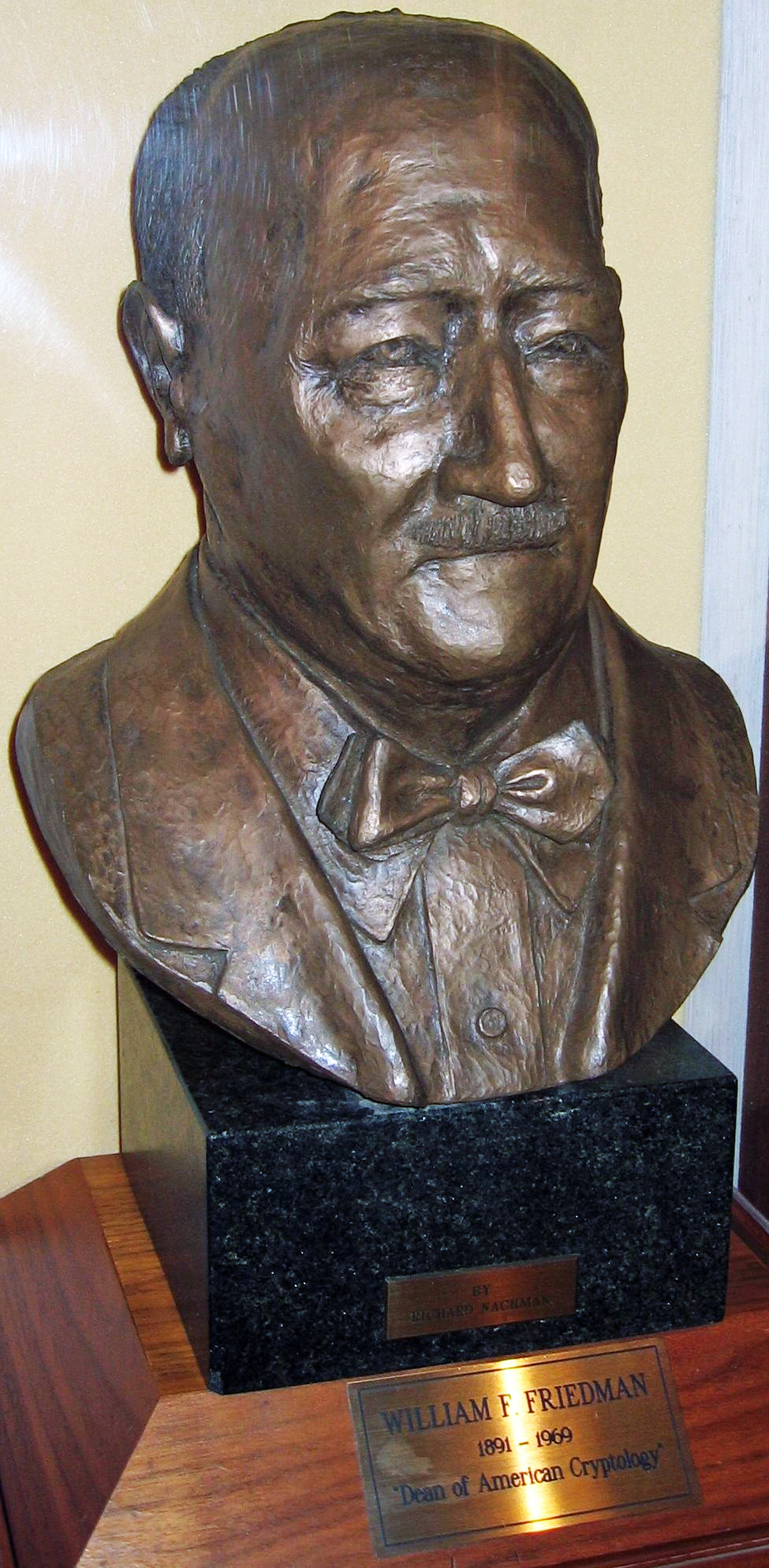
Bust of Friedman on display at the National Cryptologic Museum, where he is identified as the "Dean of American Cryptology".

Following World War II, Friedman remained in government signals intelligence. In 1949 he became head of the cryptographic division of the newly formed Armed Forces Security Agency (AFSA) and in 1952 became chief cryptologist for the National Security Agency (NSA) when it was formed to take over from AFSA. Friedman produced a classic series of textbooks, "Military Cryptanalysis", which was used to train NSA students. (These were revised and extended, under the title "Military Cryptanalytics", by Friedman's assistant and successor Lambros D. Callimahos, and used to train many additional cryptanalysts.) During his early years at NSA, he encouraged it to develop what were probably the first super-computers, although he was never convinced a machine could have the "insight" of a human mind.

Friedman spent much of his free time trying to decipher the famous Voynich Manuscript, said to be written sometime between 1403–1437. However, after four decades of study he finally had to admit defeat, contributing no more than an educated guess as to its origins and meaning.

In 1955, Friedman initiated, on behalf of the NSA, a secret agreement with Crypto AG, a Swiss manufacturer of encryption machines. The agreement resulted in many of the company's machines being compromised, so that the messages produced by them became crackable by the NSA.

Friedman retired in 1956 and, with his wife, turned his attention to the problem that had originally brought them together: examining Bacon's supposed codes. Together they wrote a book entitled The Cryptologist Looks at Shakespeare, which won a prize from the Folger Library and was published under the title The Shakespearean Ciphers Examined. The book demonstrated flaws in Gallup's work and in that of others who sought hidden ciphers in Shakespeare's work.

At NSA's request Friedman prepared Six Lectures Concerning Cryptography and Cryptanalysis, which he delivered at NSA. But later the Agency, concerned about security, confiscated the reference materials from Friedman's home.

== Death and legacy ==
Declassified copy of confiscated 1965 "Friedman Lectures on Cryptology"

Friedman's health began to fail in the late 1960s, and he died in 1969. Friedman and his wife Elizebeth are buried in Arlington National Cemetery.

Friedman and his wife donated their archives to the library of the George C. Marshall Foundation, which also has had material reclassified and removed by the NSA.

Friedman has been inducted into the Military Intelligence Hall of Fame and there is a building named after William and Elizebeth at the NSA complex at Fort Meade in Maryland. He was also presented the Medal for Merit by President Harry Truman, and the National Security Medal by Dwight Eisenhower.

Friedman has the distinction of having one of the longest known suppressed patent applications, for U.S. patent 6,097,812, a patent for a "cryptographic system". It was filed on July 25, 1933, issued on August 1, 2000.

Friedman Hall, located on Fort Huachuca, Arizona, is named in his honor.

== Children ==
Friedman had two children with his wife, Elizebeth: Barbara Friedman (later Atchison), and John Ramsay Friedman.

== In popular culture ==
Commander Schoen, a character appearing in Neal Stephenson's novel Cryptonomicon, is to a large extent inspired by Friedman. Schoen shares a significant background and personality traits with Friedman, including being one of the top cryptanalysts of the U.S. Army, breaking Japanese codes prior to Japan's involvement in World War II, and the psychological problems that he suffered from as a result. In his acknowledgements, Stephenson writes "Among all these great wartime hackers, some kind of special recognition must go to William Friedman, who sacrificed his health to break the Japanese machine cipher called Purple before the war even began."

== Awards and honors ==
- 1944: Commendation for Exceptional Civilian Service
- 1946: Medal for Merit
- 1955: National Security Medal.

== Publications ==
- The Index of Coincidence and its Applications in Cryptography (1922). Department of Ciphers. Publ 22. Geneva, Illinois: Riverbank Laboratories. OCLC 55786052.
  - 2nd ed. (1935). Washington, D.C.: Signals Office, War Department.
- The Shakespearean Ciphers Examined: An Analysis of Cryptographic Systems Used as Evidence That Some Author Other Than William Shakespeare Wrote the Plays Commonly Attributed to Him (1957). England: Cambridge University Press.
- "Preliminary Historical Report on the Solution of the 'B' Machine" (Oct. 14, 1960).

== See also ==
- Cryptography
- Elizebeth Smith Friedman
- Magic (cryptography)
- Riverbank Publications
