= Fabyan Windmill =

Windmill in Geneva Township, Kane County, Illinois

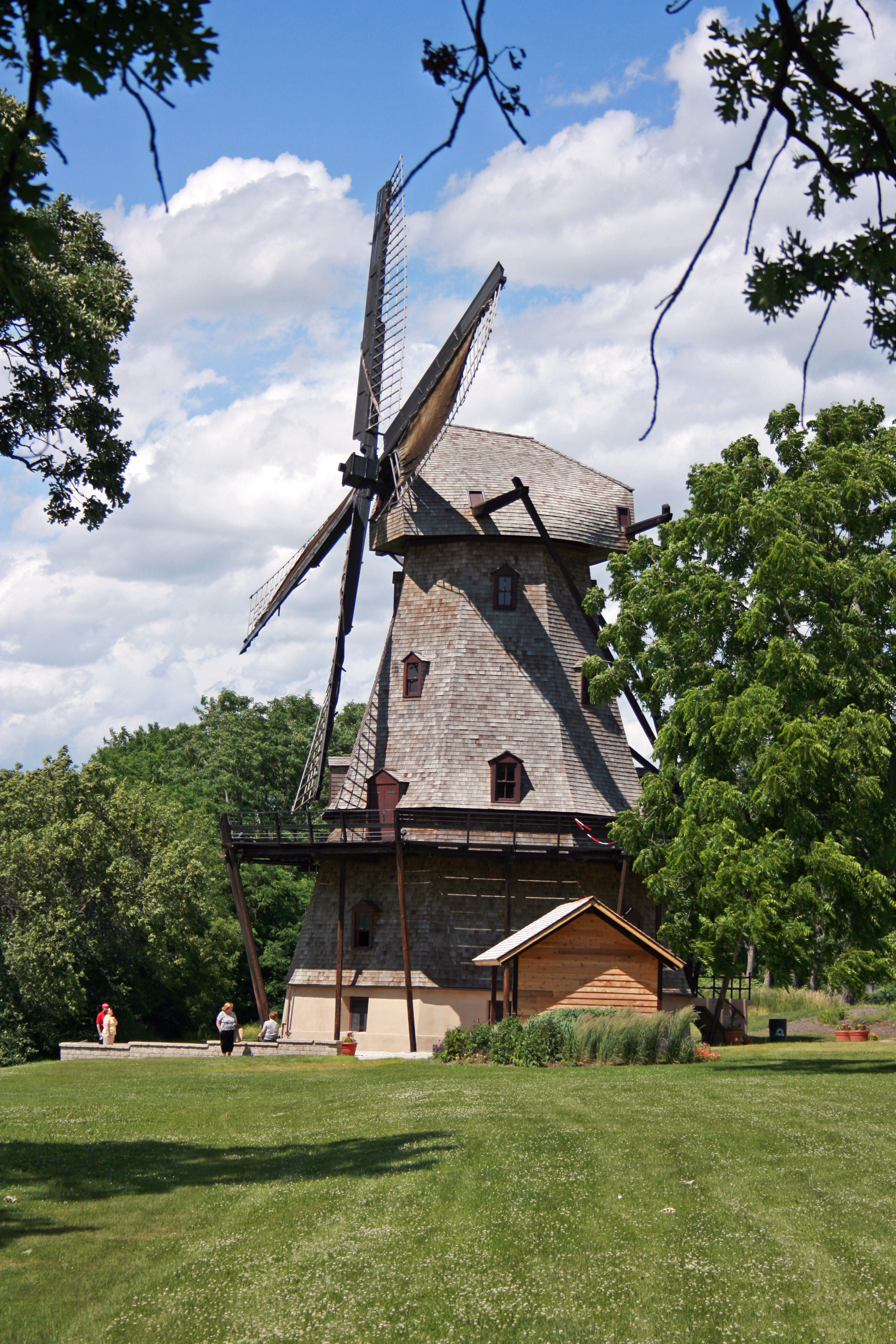
- Fabyan Windmill in June 2008
- Interactive map of Fabyan Windmill

Origin
- Mill name: Old Holland Mill; Old Dutch Mill; Dutch Windmill; Dutch Mill
- Mill location: Geneva Township, Kane County, Illinois
- Coordinates: 41°52′17″N 88°18′21″W
- Operators: Friedrich Brockmann (1875—1887); Louis Frederick Blackhaus (1875—1877); Herman Volberduig (1877—1885); Fred Runge (1887—1914); Colonel George Fabyan (1914—1939); Kane County Forest Preserve (1939—present)
- Year built: Between 1848 - 1880 (estimated)

- Dutch Mill
- U.S. National Register of Historic Places
- Nearest city: Batavia, Illinois
- Area: less than one acre
- Built: c. 1860
- Architectural style: Dutch Smock Mill
- NRHP reference No.: 79000843
- Added to NRHP: June 4, 1979

The Fabyan Windmill is an authentic, working Dutch windmill dating from the 1850s located in Geneva, Kane County, Illinois, just north of Batavia, Illinois, off Illinois Route 25. The five-story wooden smock mill with a stage, which stands 68 feet (21 m) tall, sits upon the onetime estate of Colonel George Fabyan, but is now part of the Kane County Forest Preserve District.

In 1979, the windmill was listed on the National Register of Historic Places as the Dutch Mill. The following year, the windmill was selected to be on a U.S. postage stamp, as part of a series of five windmills in a stamp booklet called "Windmills USA." It originally operated as a custom grinding mill.

== History ==
During the mid-19th century, the Fabyan Windmill was constructed by German craftsmen, Louis Blackhaus, and his brother-in-law Freidrick Brockmann, on a site at Meyers Road near 16th Street in York Township between Elmhurst and Oak Brook, Illinois (now Lombard, Illinois).

By the early 20th century, the windmill had fallen into a state of disrepair. In 1914, George Fabyan purchased the disused windmill for approximately $8,000 (equivalent to $257,100 in 2025) from Mrs. Fred Runge. He then had it moved to its present location in Geneva Township on the east side of the Fox River, close to Illinois Route 25 in July 1915. Fabyan spent an estimated $75,000 (equivalent to $2,386,900 in 2025) to have it moved, reconstructed, and restored.

The Edgar E. Belding Company of West Chicago was contracted by Fabyan to move the windmill from York Center. It was slowly dismantled piece by piece, with Roman numerals carved into the beams and braces to facilitate correct reconstruction. Some of the largest beams had to be hauled by a team of mules.

The windmill was reassembled on its present site by a Danish millwright named Rasmussen, with the assistance of John Johnson and six others from the Wilson Bros. Construction Co. After nineteen months, the relocation and reconstruction were completed. The mill was a wonder in its day, because it is thought to be the only fully automatic wind-driven mill of its type.

George Fabyan died in 1936, and his wife died two years later. The estate was then sold by the executors of the will to the Kane County Forest Preserve District for $70,500 (equivalent to $1,612,500 in 2025).

== Structure ==
The giant cypress wood beams, trimmed with black walnut, are all hand joined and doweled with wood dowels. In fact, there are no metal nails used inside the structure. Even the original gearing was handmade of hickory and maple, with all five floors containing different mechanisms.

The windmill was a functioning mill used by the Fabyans for grinding several types of grain, including corn, wheat, rye, and oats. It also served as a grain mill for Fabyan's herd of prized Jersey cattle.

At the mill's top, or cap, is a huge cogged wheel called the brake wheel, which was turned by wind blowing against the sails. The sails are covered with canvas sailcloths to help catch the wind. The sails had to be entirely reconstructed by Rasmussen and John Johnson, because they were missing when Fabyan bought the mill. The sails span 74 feet 4 inches. The brake wheel, located in the cap, rotates an upright shaft running the height of the mill. This shaft supplied power to all of the mill's operations.

There is a set of belt-driven elevators, remarkable for its time, that moved the grains from chutes to hoppers, and even from floor to floor, making the mill almost fully automatic. Most other mills required workers to hand shovel materials between operations.

During its reconstruction, the Colonel had a new foundation poured, which created a basement. In the basement, he had ovens installed whose vents and chimney extended underground beneath Route 25 to a structure that once stood on the other side. In addition to the ovens, marble slabs and cooling racks were also installed. It is thought that at one time, the windmill basement was an operating bakery. During the flour rationing of World War I, the bakery supposedly produced bread for the Fabyan family and even for their two bears, Tom and Jerry. However, the extent of use of the mill's bakery is debatable due to an inadequate oven draft.

== Significance ==
The wind-powered mill is a type that was rarely built in the United States, where grist mills are usually powered by water. Its wooden gears and nail-less construction techniques are of interest both technically and architecturally. The mill is also an example of an America folly, a structure built primarily to enhance the landscape or view. In this case, George Fabyan, a wealthy merchant, purchased and moved the by-then inoperative mill to beautify his estate, but maintained it as a private mill with no commercial value.

== Today ==
Kane County considered the windmill's demolition as early as 1990 when it became structurally unsafe for public inspection. However, local citizens began fighting to keep the mill intact. In 1997, the Forest Preserve District contracted third-generation Dutch windmill maker Lucas Verbij to fully restore the windmill for a cost of over $900,000 (equivalent to $1,805,000 in 2025). It made its public debut in June 2005.

The Fabyan Windmill is the best example of an authentic Dutch windmill in the United States, actually it's a treasure and would be the most popular windmill in the Netherlands (we currently have 1000 windmills).

— Lucas Verbij

The grinding mechanisms to make flour have been restored and are in use today by mill volunteers who do demonstrations to the public.

Even now, the varnish from 1915 is in near perfect condition because the climate inside the mill varies little from season to season due to its superior construction, and the Roman numeral markings carved into the beams used in original reconstruction are still visible.
