= Benjamin Peirce (disambiguation) =

Benjamin Peirce (1809–1880), Professor of Mathematics at Harvard University.

Benjamin Peirce may also refer to:

- Benjamin Osgood Peirce (1854–1914), Hollis Professor of Mathematics and Natural Philosophy at Harvard University
- USCS Benjamin Peirce, a survey ship in commission in the United States Coast Survey from 1855 to 1868
- Benjamin Peirce (librarian) (1778–1831), librarian of the Harvard Library

== See also ==
- Benjamin Pierce (disambiguation)
- Benjamin Pearse (1832–1902), Canadian public servant
