= James Mills Peirce =

American mathematician and educator (1834–1906)

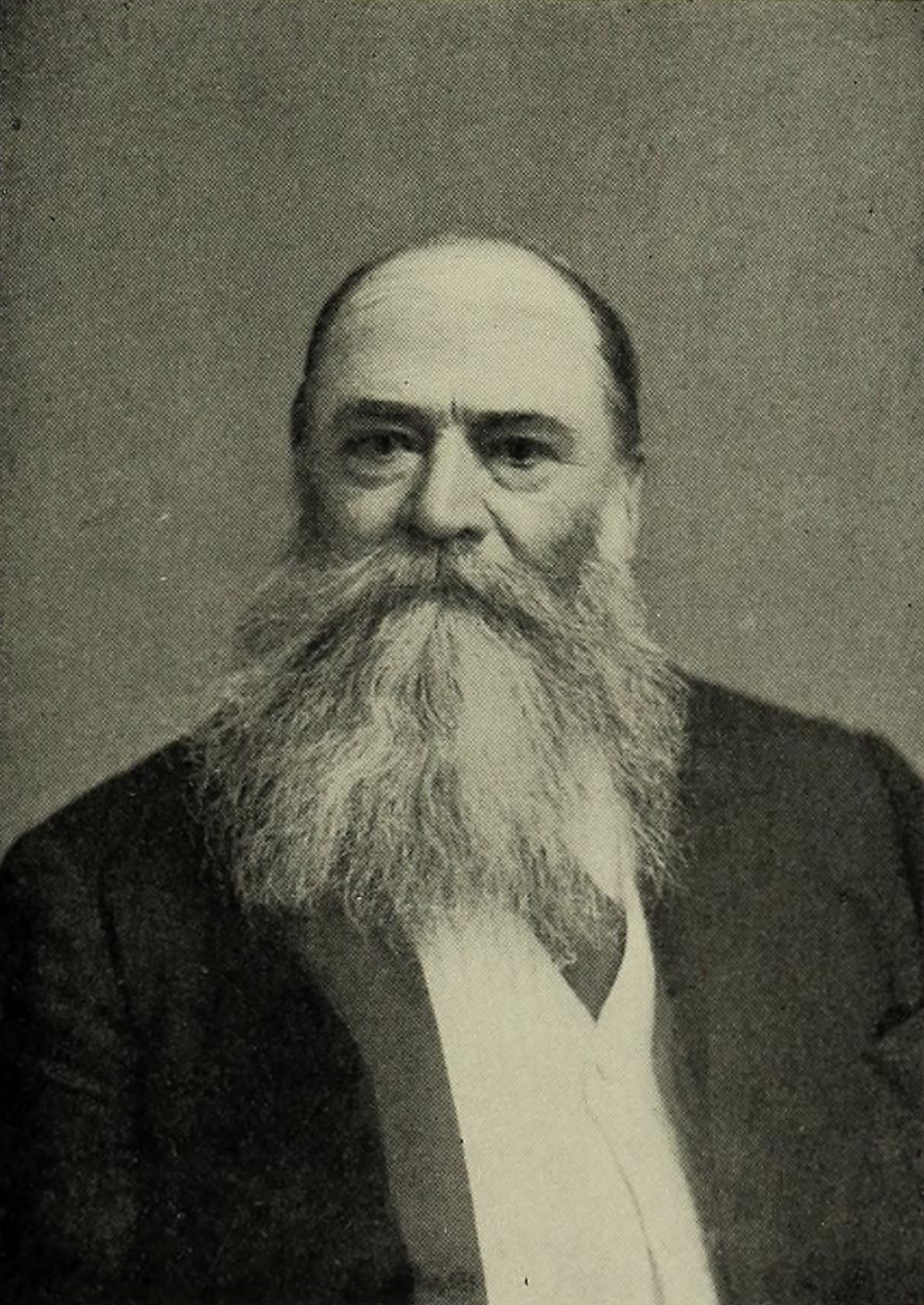
- Peirce in 1899 publication
- Born: May 1, 1834; Cambridge, Massachusetts
- Died: March 21, 1906 (aged 71)
- Education: Harvard College (1853); Harvard Divinity School (1859)
- Father: Benjamin Peirce
- Relatives: Charles Sanders Peirce (brother); Herbert H. D. Peirce (brother); Benjamin Peirce (grandfather)

2nd Perkins Professor of Astronomy and Mathematics
- In office 1885–1906
- Preceded by: Benjamin Peirce
- Succeeded by: William Elwood Byerly

Dean of the Harvard Faculty of Arts and Sciences
- In office 1895–1898

Signature
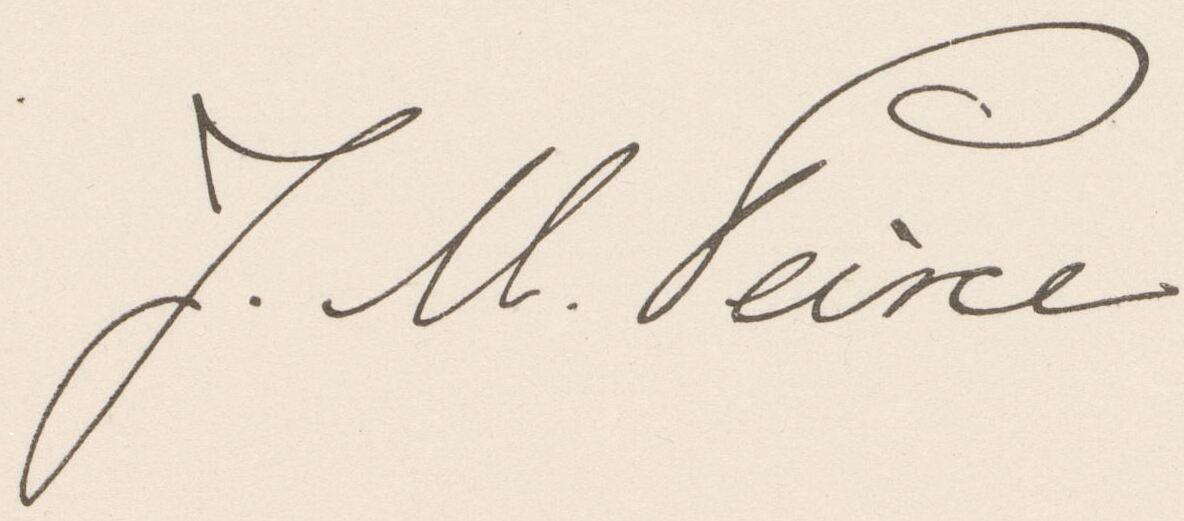

James Mills Peirce (May 1, 1834 – March 21, 1906) was an American mathematician and educator. He taught at Harvard University for almost 50 years.

== Early life and family ==
Peirce was born May 1, 1834, in Cambridge, Massachusetts. He was the eldest son of Sarah Hunt (Mills) Peirce and Benjamin Peirce (1809–1880), a professor of astronomy and mathematics at Harvard University. The family was considered part of the Boston Brahmin elite class. The surname is pronounced to rhyme with "purse". Benjamin Peirce's father, also named Benjamin, was librarian at Harvard. James had four younger siblings; one brother was philosopher, logician and professor Charles Sanders Peirce (1839–1914). Another brother was Herbert Henry Davis Peirce (1849–1916) who was the First Secretary of the American Embassy in Saint Petersburg, Russia, at the end of the 19th century.

J. M. Peirce graduated from Harvard College in 1853. While an undergraduate at Harvard, he was a member of the Hasty Pudding Club. He attended Harvard's law school for one year. In 1857, he enrolled at the university's Divinity School and graduated in 1859.

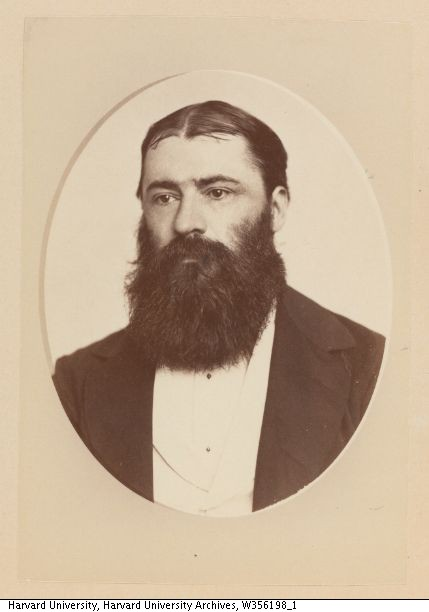

== Career ==
Like his father, James Mills Peirce became a professor of mathematics and astronomy at Harvard. He was first a Tutor in Mathematics, then a proctor at Harvard. He was a preacher in Boston and Charleston, South Carolina, but eventually returned to academia, first as Assistant Professor of Mathematics in 1861. He was promoted to University Professor of Mathematics in 1869, then to Perkins Professor of Astronomy and Mathematics—the same position his father once held—in 1885. He was head of the Graduate Department at Harvard from 1872 to 1895 (becoming its dean when it was converted to the Graduate School). He was the Dean of the Faculty of Arts and Sciences from 1895 to 1898.

Among his publications are Mathematical Tables Chiefly to Four Figures (1896) and A Text-Book of Analytic Geometry; On the Basis of Professor Peirce's Treatise (1857).

He introduced Edwin Bidwell Wilson to the algebra of quaternions, thus preparing him for Josiah Willard Gibbs algebra for physical space, that Wilson edited to write Vector Analysis, a widely used textbook.

== Personal life ==
Peirce was an early proponent of homosexuality, writing extensively about gay love. "Sexual Inversion" (Studies in the Psychology of Sex Vol. 2, 1897) by influential British sexologist Havelock Ellis contains in-depth case histories. It featured a letter by "Professor X." Circumstantial but suggestive evidence has identified the letter writer as Peirce. He wrote, "[W]e ought to think and speak of homosexual love, not as 'inverted' or 'abnormal' . . . but as being in itself a natural, pure and sound passion."
