= Edwin Hall =

American physicist (1855–1938)

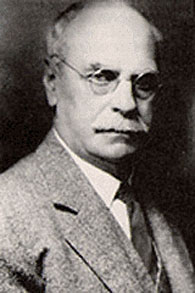
- Born: Edwin Herbert Hall; November 7, 1855; Gorham, Maine, US
- Died: November 20, 1938 (aged 83); Cambridge, Massachusetts, US
- Education: Bowdoin College; Johns Hopkins University (PhD)
- Known for: Hall effect (1879)
- Title: Rumford Professor of Physics (1914–21)
- Predecessor: John Trowbridge
- Successor: George W. Pierce
- Awards: Oersted Medal (1937)
- Scientific career
- Fields: Electromagnetism
- Workplaces: Harvard University (1895–1921)
- Thesis: On the New Action of Magnetism on a Permanent Electric Current (1880)
- Doctoral advisor: Henry A. Rowland
- Doctoral students: Harvey N. Davis (1906)

Edwin Herbert Hall (November 7, 1855 – November 20, 1938) was an American professor of physics at Harvard University. He is most famous for the discovery of the Hall effect. Over his career he wrote many physics textbooks and experiment procedures and was awarded with the 1937 Award for Notable Contributions to the Teaching of Physics. He also performed much research into creating a theory combining thermodynamic and electrical phenomena.

== Life ==
Edwin H Hall was born in North Gorham Maine on November 7, 1855. His parents were Joshua Emery Hall and Lucy Ann Hilborn Hall. Edwin had two brothers and two sisters. All but one brother, Frederic Winslow Hall, died as an infant or in early childhood. Edwin worked as a farm hand until he entered college at age 16.

Hall married Caroline Eliza Bottum, his assistant from Brunswick High School, in late August of 1882. Together they had two children, Constance Huntington Hall and Frederic Hilborn Hall.

In 1919, the majority of the Boston Police force voted to go on strike. The President of Harvard, A. Lawrence Lowell, encouraged the students to volunteer as replacement officers. On top of the many students who volunteered, professor Edwin Hall was first to volunteer for service.

Professor Hall was also a large fan of athletics. He served on the Harvard Athletic Committee and wrote articles for them. He also played golf for many years after his retirement.

== Education and career ==
Hall started his undergraduate education at Bowdoin University at the age of 15 and graduated top of his class at 19, with a Bachelor of Arts degree. He was the Principal of Gould Academy (1875–76) and the Principal of Brunswick High School (1876–77). He did his graduate schooling and research, and earned his Ph.D. in 1880 at the Johns Hopkins University where his seminal experiments were performed.

Hall was appointed a professor of physics at Harvard University in 1895, and succeeded John Trowbridge to the Rumford Chair of Physics in 1914. After returning to the Physics Department, Hall retired in 1921 and died in Cambridge, Massachusetts, in 1938.

== Hall effect ==
The Hall effect was discovered by Hall in 1879, while working on his doctoral thesis in physics under the supervision of Henry Augustus Rowland. Hall's experiments in electromagnetics consisted of exposing thin gold leaf (and, later, using various other materials) on a glass plate and tapping off the gold leaf at points down its length. The effect is a potential difference (Hall voltage) on opposite sides of a thin sheet of conducting or semiconducting material (the Hall element) through which an electric current is flowing. This was created by a magnetic field applied perpendicular to the Hall element. The ratio of the voltage created to the amount of current is known as the Hall resistance and is a characteristic of the material in the element. In 1880, Hall's experimentation was published as a doctoral thesis in the American Journal of Science and in the Philosophical Magazine. He then read this paper to the British Association at their York meeting.

Hall-effect sensors use his Hall effect to detect the magnetic field. Hundreds of millions are sold every year and they are present in a large number of devices. Hall-effect thrusters exploit the effect in spacecraft electric propulsion systems.

In the presence of large magnetic field strength and low temperature, one can observe the quantum Hall effect, the quantization of the Hall resistance. In 1990, it became a calibration standard for electrical resistance due to its low uncertainty (see Quantum Hall effect § Applications).

== Works ==
Hall made various contributions to scientific journals on the thermal conductivity of iron and nickel, the theory of thermoelectric action, and on thermoelectric heterogeneity in metals. His publications include:

- A Text-Book of Physics (1891; third edition, 1903), with J. Y. Bergen
- Elementary Lessons in Physics (1894; 1900)
- The Teaching of Chemistry and Physics (1902), with Alexander Smith
- College Laboratory Manual of Physics (1904; revised edition, 1913)
- Elements of Physics (1912)

== See also ==
- Hall effect
- Henry Augustus Rowland
- Scientific phenomena named after people

=== Relevant lists ===
- List of eponyms
- List of physicists
