= Perkins Professorship of Astronomy and Mathematics =

Endowed professorship at Harvard College

The Perkins Professorship of Astronomy and Mathematics is an endowed professorship established at Harvard College in 1842 by James Perkins, Jr., (1761–1822).

== History of the Perkins Chair ==
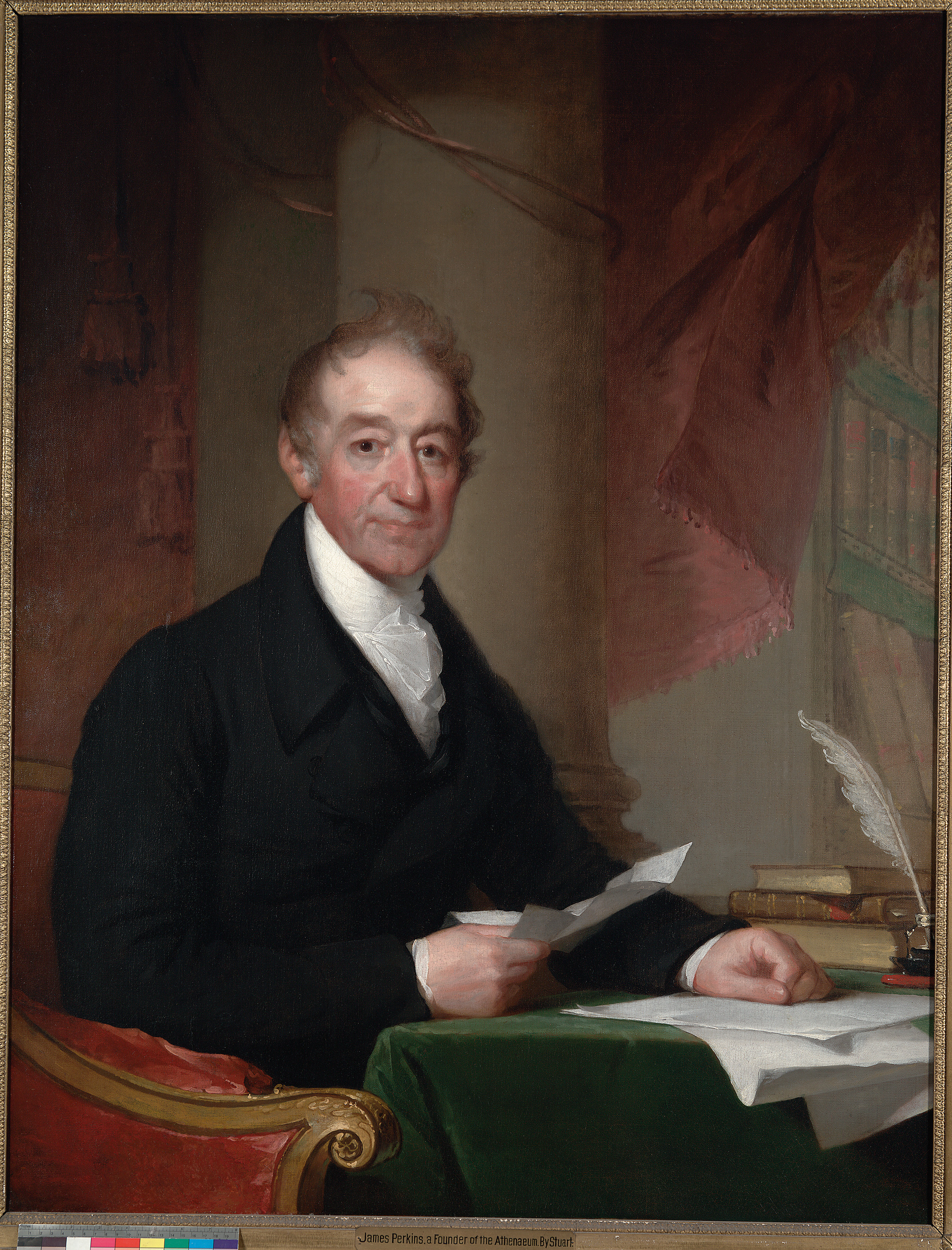
James Perkins, Jr., portrait by Gilbert Stuart

James Perkins, Jr., was a Boston philanthropist, benefactor of the Boston Athenæum, and co-founder with his younger brother Thomas Handasyd Perkins of the Perkins School for the Blind. In his will, Perkins left $20,000 to Harvard College to establish a chair in "whatever field the President and Fellows should find the most useful". The funds were transferred to Harvard on February 20, 1842, upon the death of Perkins' wife. At that time the Harvard Corporation voted

...that a Professorship of Astronomy and Mathematics be established in the College to be denominated the Perkins Professorship of Astronomy and Mathematics.

The Perkins chair was the second chair in mathematics, the first and most famous being the Hollis Chair in Mathematics and Natural Philosophy endowed by Thomas Hollis in 1727. The Hollis Chair in Mathematics was in turn the second professorship endowed at Harvard, the first being the Hollis Chair of Divinity endowed in 1721. Hollis Chair of Divinity is in its turn the oldest endowed chair in the United States.

In 1906, noting that chairs in astronomy had been endowed in 1858 (Phillips) and in 1887 (Paine), the Corporation voted

...that the title of the Perkins Professorship of Astronomy and Mathematics ... be amended so that it shall read Perkins Professorship in Mathematics.

Starting with the most recent appointment in 1991 the name of the chair informally became the Perkins Professor of Applied Mathematics when the chair was moved to Harvard's School of Engineering and Applied Sciences. The formal name of the chair remains unchanged.

== Holders of the Perkins Professorship of Astronomy and Mathematics ==
The holders of the Perkins Professorship of Astronomy and Mathematics have been:

- Benjamin Peirce (1842–1880)
- James Mills Peirce (1885–1906)
- William Elwood Byerly (1906–1913)
- William Fogg Osgood (1914–1933)
- George David Birkhoff (1933–1944)
- Joseph Leonard Walsh (1946–1966)
- Richard Dagobert Brauer (1966–1971)
- John Torrence Tate, Jr (1971–1991)
- David Kazhdan (1991–2003)
- Mark Kisin (2018–)
