= Frederick Vinton Hunt =

Acoustic engineer and academic (1905–1972)

- Born: February 15, 1905; Barnesville, Ohio
- Died: April 20, 1972 (aged 67); Buffalo, NY
- Citizenship: USA
- Education: Ohio State University, Harvard University
- Known for: sonar
- Awards: ASA Gold Medal (1969)
- Scientific career
- Fields: Acoustics, Audio engineering
- Workplaces: Harvard University
- Doctoral advisor: Emory Leon Chaffee, George Washington Pierce
- Doctoral students: Leo Beranek

Frederick Vinton Hunt (February 15, 1905 – April 21, 1972) was an inventor, a scientist and a professor at Harvard University who worked in the field of acoustic engineering.

He made significant contributions to room acoustics, regulated power supply, lightweight phonograph pickups and electronic reproduction equipment, and notably, during World War II, invented new techniques for sonar (an acronym that he invented, though the gloss was changed by others). He developed the first efficient and modern sonar system, for this work he received the Medal for Merit from President Truman (1947), and the Navy Distinguished Service Medal by the U.S. Navy in 1970.

== Education ==
Frederick Vinton (Ted) Hunt was born in 1905 in Barnesville, Ohio. He received his B.A. and B.E.E. degrees from Ohio State University in 1924 and 1925, respectively, where he was also a member of Phi Beta Kappa, Tau Beta Pi, Sigma Xi, and Eta Kappa Nu. He received a masters degree at Harvard in 1928, and was appointed there as an Instructor in Physics and Communication Engineering. He submitted two doctoral theses: one to the Department of Physics in 1933, and one to the Engineering School in 1934. Both were accepted, but Harvard President James Bryant Conant issued a ruling that no student was allowed to receive more than one doctorate from Harvard University. Since he had already defended the Physics dissertation at the time of the ruling, Hunt accepted a doctorate in Physics. President Conant later conferred the honorary doctorate on Professor Hunt, upon which occasion Hunt joked that this was the second degree he had first earned in 1934.

== Contributions to room acoustics ==
Hunt's Physics dissertation, "The use of a frequency modulated source in reverberation measurements," published in the Journal of the Acoustical Society of America in 1934, described the use of a "warble tone" to improve the reliability of reverberation time measurements in concert halls. Hunt continued this work with his first doctoral student, Leo Beranek. In 1939, Hunt, Beranek and Maa published a theory of the separate decay times of the normal modes of a rectangular room. Demonstrating that the initial and asymptotic reverberant decay are governed by the non-grazing and grazing modes of the room, respectively.

== Contributions to sound recording ==
Hunt's contributions to sound recording have been compared to Sabine's contributions to room acoustics, in that both were initiated by a pragmatic short-term request from a President of Harvard. Hunt was asked, in 1935, to record the tercentenary celebrations at Harvard. He discovered that the relatively high mass (50g) of existing phonograph needles limited their ability to reproduce high frequencies. Using a relatively new recording medium (discs coated in cellulose lacquer), Hunt and his colleague J.A. Pierce developed recording needles of less than 5g mass, with substantially improved audio quality.

== Contributions to underwater acoustics and SONAR ==
In October 1941, Hunt's Harvard Underwater Sound Laboratory (HUSL) developed a technique for underwater electroacoustic target sensing that they called the bearing deviation indicator (BDI). In 1942, Admiral Louis McKeehan of the Mine Warfare Branch of the Bureau of Ordnance came to Hunt's Harvard Underwater Sound Laboratory (HUSL) to seek Hunt's assistance with the development of a torpedo that could use acoustics to navigate toward an underwater submarine. Hunt and his students developed an architecture with two transducers, on either side of the nose cone; the "Mark 24 mine" sunk its first German submarine in late 1943.

Hunt created the name sonar to refer to one of the components of BDI. In 1942, Chris Engelman in the Navy Bureau of Ships asked Hunt for suggestions that would make the job of an acoustic ranging technician more glamorous, in order to help the Navy to recruit enlisted men. Hunt proposed using the name sonar for all underwater acoustic ranging equipment. Engelman changed the gloss for the word sonar (to Sound Navigation And Ranging), and wrote an internal Navy memo proposing the term.

In July 1946, the Office of Research and Inventions (later to become the Office of Naval Research), entered into contract Nori 76 Task Order X with Harvard University. The negotiations surrounding this grant have been credited with creating the separation between fundamental research and what Hunt called "motivated research," as Harvard refused to accept funding detrimental to its core missions of education and training. Task Order X was renewed twice, and resulted in a large-scale expansion of HUSL; at one point, HUSL employed 450 people. Hunt submitted the third "project final report" for Task Order X in 1970.

== Textbooks ==
Professor Hunt began writing a textbook in Physical Acoustics in 1948. That book was never published; instead, two of its chapters became books that, because of their focused content, continue to be used in courses today.

The first was Electroacoustics, published in 1954. Among other innovations, Hunt proposed novel scalar forms of Lorenz's law and Ampere's law that permit efficient circuit analysis of electrodynamic transducers. This was done by proposing that, just as the constant j=sqrt(-1) is used to denote 90-degree temporal phase shift, an operator k=sqrt(-1) can be used to denote 90-degree spatial phase shift.

The second was "Origins in Acoustics," a posthumously-published history of acoustics from the time of Pythagoras to the 20th century.

== Professional service: ASA and AES ==
Professor Hunt attended every meeting of the Acoustical Society of America but one, from the first meeting held in 1929 until Hunt's death in 1972; he died from a heart attack while attending the 83rd meeting of the society in Buffalo, New York. He was a member of its Executive Council from 1938-1941, and President from 1951-2, and received the Gold Medal from the Acoustical Society of America in 1969. After his death, the Acoustical Society of America established an annual post-doctoral research fellowship in his name, which has been awarded annually since 1978.

Professor Hunt was an honorary member of the Audio Engineering Society (AES). He was President of AES from 1969–70, and received its Gold and Silver Medals in 1965.

== Other Documents ==
- Harvard University Archives's file on F.V.Hunt
