= Benjamin Pierce =

Benjamin or Ben Pierce may refer to:

- Benjamin Pierce (governor) (1757–1839), governor of New Hampshire in the 1820s, father of U.S. President Franklin Pierce
- Benjamin Pierce (1841–1853), the last surviving son of U.S. President Franklin Pierce; died in a train accident (Franklin Pierce rail accident) just before his father's inauguration
- Benjamin C. Pierce (born 1963), American professor of computer science
- Benjamin Kendrick Pierce (1790–1850), U.S. Army officer in the Seminole Wars and brother of U.S. President Franklin Pierce, namesake of Fort Pierce, Florida
- Ben J. Pierce (born 1999), American YouTuber, singer-songwriter, and actor

== Events ==
- Benjamin Pierce rail accident

== Fiction ==
- Benjamin Franklin "Hawkeye" Pierce (mostly known as Hawkeye Pierce), fictional character in the M*A*S*H film and television series
- Benjamin Pierce, fictional schizophrenic artist in the David Cronenberg film Scanners

== See also ==
- Benjamin Peirce (disambiguation)
- Benjamin Pearse (1832–1902), Canadian public servant
- Ben Pearce, English DJ and producer based in Manchester
- Benjamin W. Pearce (1816–1870), American politician
