= Hollis Chair =

Hollis Chair may refer to:

- Hollis Chair of Divinity, a chair established at Harvard College
- Hollis Chair of Mathematics and Natural Philosophy, a chair established at Harvard College
