= Rumford Chair of Physics =

Endowed professorship at Harvard university

The Rumford Chair of Physics (originally the Rumford Chair and Lectureship on the Application of Science to the Useful Arts) is an endowed professorship established at Harvard University in 1816 under the will of Benjamin Thompson, Count Rumford.

== Endowment ==
Specifically, an initial annuity of $1000 (with reversion of certain further substantial annuities) was bequeathed “for the purpose of founding […] a new institution and professorship, in order to teach by regular courses of academical and public lectures, accompanied with proper experiments, the utility of the physical and mathematical sciences for the improvement of the useful arts, and for the extension of the industry, prosperity, happiness, and well-being of society.” The centrality of “useful” knowledge, in contradistinction to the classical tradition then dominant at Harvard, was further emphasised by a stipulation that the professorship was to be held outside of the philosophy department.

== History ==
The first incumbent, Jacob Bigelow, a physician and botanist, pursued a modernising agenda with moderate success, incorporating practical demonstrations into his lectures over the course of a decade-long tenure. In contrast, his autodidact successor, the inventor Daniel Treadwell, appears to have been a rather less fervent reformer, seemingly believing that the skills necessary for creative practice in science and engineering were not really amenable to being taught. Fortuitously, however, the eventual appointment of the third Rumford Professor, engineer and chemist Eben Norton Horsford, coincided with the foundation of the Lawrence Scientific School at Harvard in 1847, facilitating the inception of a highly practical curriculum informed by links with local chemical industries. Following the intervening tenure of Oliver Wolcott Gibbs, the appointment of John Trowbridge to the Rumford Chair in 1888 heralded a further shift in emphasis; henceforth, original research would become at least equal in importance alongside practical teaching. All subsequent incumbents have enjoyed highly distinguished research careers, such as Edwin Herbert Hall (discoverer of the Hall Effect) and Nicolaas Bloembergen (Nobel laureate for his work on laser spectroscopy).

== Recipients ==
Holders of the Rumford Chair have been:

- Jacob Bigelow (1816–1827)
- Daniel Treadwell (1834–1845)
- Eben Norton Horsford (1847–1863)
- Oliver Wolcott Gibbs (1863–1887)
- John Trowbridge (1888–1910)
- Edwin Herbert Hall (1914–1921)
- George Washington Pierce (1921–1940)
- Emory Leon Chaffee (1940–1953)
- Frederick Vinton Hunt (1953–1972)
- Nicolaas Bloembergen (1974–1980)
- Michael Tinkham (1980–2010)
- Jene A. Golovchenko (2010–2018)
