= Samuel Williams (minister) =

American minister and educator

Samuel Williams LL.D.
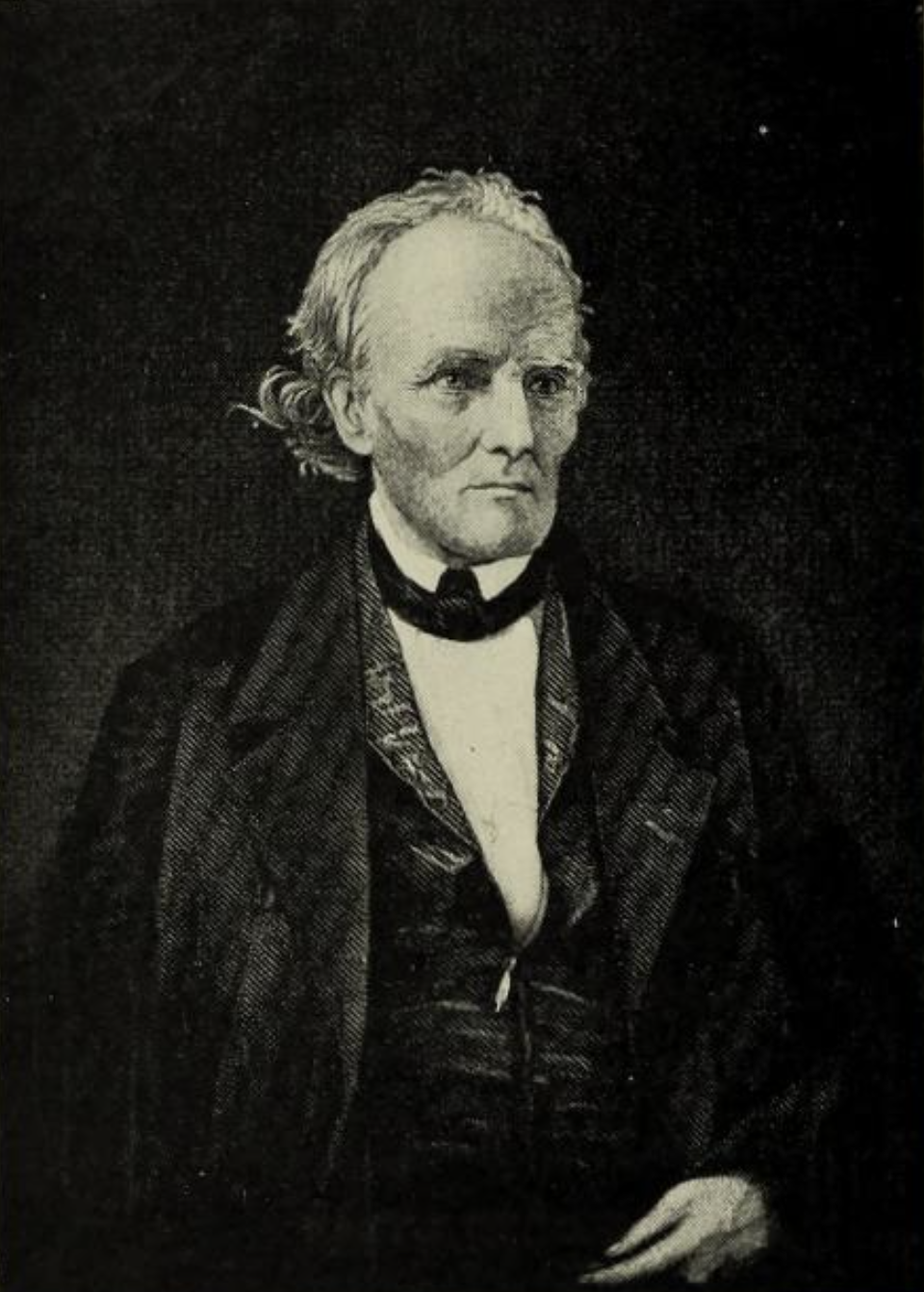

3rd Hollis Chair of Mathematicks and Natural Philosophy at Harvard University
- In office 1779–1789
- Preceded by: John Winthrop
- Succeeded by: Samuel Webber

Personal life
- Born: April 23, 1743 Waltham, Massachusetts
- Died: January 2, 1817 (aged 73) Rutland, Vermont
- Resting place: North Main Street Cemetery, Rutland, Vermont
- Education: Harvard University
- Relatives: Rev. John Williams (grandfather)

Religious life
- Religion: Presbyterianism

Samuel Williams (April 23, 1743 – January 2, 1817) was an American minister, educator, and astronomer.

== Early life and education ==
Born in Waltham, Massachusetts, Williams entered Harvard, and graduated in 1761. While at Harvard, he gained the attention of notable scientist and professor John Winhrop, whom Williams accompanied shortly before his graduation to observe the 1761 transit of Venus. He was elected as a member to the American Philosophical Society in 1772. Returning to Waltham, Williams found little opportunity for further work in astronomy and began studying as a presbyterian minister.

== Career ==
Working as a priest in Bradford, Massachusetts, he continued his astronomic and scientific inquiries and regularly featured in the Salem newspaper. In 1780 he dedicated himself full time to scientific pursuits, trading his pastorate in Bradford for a post as Professor of Mathematics and Natural Philosophy at Harvard. His teaching was commemorated by the likes of John Quincy Adams, a pupil of his, and his papers were published by the APS and American Academy of Arts and Sciences.

Like many of his contemporaries, his writing and lectures spanned various fields and topics, ranging from astronomy, heat, electricity, air, magnetism, earthquakes, eclipses, and weather phenomenon. He earned honorary LL.D. degrees from Yale and Edinburgh, and election to the Meteorological Society of Manheim. Despite such high honors, Williams’ career came crashing down when he was accused of mishandling funds, spending too much money on his wife, and worst of all, forgery. This caused him to leave Harvard in 1788, and, now an outcast, he resigned to the village of Rutland in Vermont. He took up priestly duties once again, only returning to academia to give lectures at the University of Vermont. Meanwhile, he also founded and edited the Rutland Herald, continued his activity with the APS, published his sermons, and documented the landscape and history of Vermont.

== Death ==
He died of a brief illness in his home in Rutland, Vermont. He is buried at the North Main Street Cemetery.
