= Chun Ning Lau =

American physicist and academic

Jeanie (Chun Ning) Lau
- Education: Harvard University; University of Chicago
- Scientific career
- Workplaces: Hewlett-Packard; Ohio State University; University of California, Riverside
- Thesis: Quantum phase slips in superconducting nanowires (2001)
- Doctoral advisor: Michael Tinkham

Chun Ning "Jeanie" Lau is an American physicist currently working as a Professor of Quantum Materials at Ohio State University. Her research considers materials for quantum technologies, including van der Waals materials and superconductors. She was elected a Fellow of the American Physical Society in 2017.

== Early life and education ==
Lau studied physics at the University of Chicago, receiving her bachelor's degree in 1994. She moved to Harvard University for graduate research where she would earn her master's in 1997. Continuing at Harvard, Lau went on to complete her Ph.D. in physics with Michael Tinkham as her doctoral advisor. Lau received her Ph.D. and her thesis was published in 2001. After completing her doctorate, Lau joined Hewlett Packard Labs, where she worked as a research associate.

== Research and career ==
Lau joined the University of California, Riverside as a professor in 2004 and would remain at the university until 2016. Whilst at Riverside, she accidentally realized that when stacking three layers of graphene, depending on how the layers were stacked, the structure would behave as either a conductor or an insulator. She made use of Raman spectroscopy to understand the precise stacking orders, and predicted that enhanced electronic interactions between layers with specific geometries were responsible for the formation of a band gap.

Lau moved to Ohio State University as a professor in 2017. She studies how quantum confinement impacts the electronic properties and works on topological superconductors and the fabrication of 2D materials with Moiré patterns.

== Awards and honors ==
- 2008 Presidential Early Career Award for Scientists and Engineers
- 2008 National Science Foundation CAREER Award
- 2013 Chancellor's Award for Fostering Undergraduate Research and Creative Achievement
- 2017 Elected Fellow of the American Physical Society

== Selected publications ==
- Alexander A Balandin; Suchismita Ghosh; Wenzhong Bao; Irene Calizo; Desalegne Teweldebrhan; Feng Miao; Chun Ning Lau (March 2008). "Superior thermal conductivity of single-layer graphene". Nano Letters. 8 (3): 902–7. doi:10.1021/nl0731872. ISSN 1530-6984. PMID 18284217. Wikidata Q28269187.
- S. Ghosh; I. Calizo; D. Teweldebrhan; et al. (14 April 2008). "Extremely high thermal conductivity of graphene: Prospects for thermal management applications in nanoelectronic circuits". Applied Physics Letters. 92 (15): 151911. doi:10.1063/1.2907977. ISSN 0003-6951. Wikidata Q63549462.
- Chun Ning Lau; Marc W. Bockrath; Kin Fai Mak; Fan Zhang (2 February 2022). "Reproducibility in the fabrication and physics of moiré materials". Nature. 602 (7895): 41–50. Bibcode:2022Natur.602...41L. doi:10.1038/s41586-021-04173-z. ISSN 1476-4687. PMID 35110759. Wikidata Q115777943.
