= Tachytrope =

A tachytrope is a curve in which the law of the velocity is given. It was first used by American mathematician Benjamin Peirce in A System of Analytic Mechanics, first published in 1855.
