= Joseph Lovering =

American scientist and educator

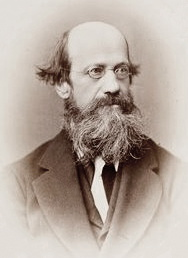
- Lovering circa 1868–1875
- Born: 25 December 1813; Boston, Massachusetts
- Died: 18 January 1892 (aged 78); Boston, Massachusetts
- Education: Harvard University (A.B., 1833)
- Scientific career
- Fields: Mathematics
- Workplaces: Harvard University
- Academic advisors: Benjamin Peirce
- Doctoral students: John Trowbridge

Joseph Lovering (25 December 1813 – 18 January 1892) was an American scientist and educator.

== Biography ==
Lovering graduated from Harvard in 1833. In 1838, he was named Hollis Chair of Mathematicks and Natural Philosophy at Harvard. He held this chair until 1888, when he was appointed Professor Emeritus, after 50 years service. He was acting regent of the university (1853–1854) and succeeded Felton as regent.

He was director of Jefferson Physical Laboratory from 1884 to 1888, and was associated with the Harvard College Observatory, especially in the joint observations of the United States and the London Royal Society on terrestrial magnetism.

From 1869 to 1873 he served as corresponding secretary, from 1873 to 1880 vice president, and from 1880 to 1881 president of the American Association for the Advancement of Science.

He contributed to numerous scientific publications, prepared a volume on The Aurora Borealis (1873), and edited a new edition of Professor John Farrar's Electricity and Magnetism (1842).

In 1837, several Yale professors - Denison Olmsted, Alexander Twining, Elias Loomis, along with Edward Herrick had published papers supporting the existence of an annual meteor storm in August (which peaks around the 9th/10th of the month). Lovering was a strong opponent of this idea. He believed that meteor showers were related to the weather rather than "the Earth in its revolution had encroached upon a nest of meteors". He also did not believe that meteor showers recurred at the same dates annually. Instead, he said, "meteoritic appearances are much more common every night than has been imagined" and "no season of the year is especially provided : that about the same average number can be seen every fair night... an equal and uniform distribution of meteors throughout the year".

He was elected as a member to the American Philosophical Society in 1881.

Academic offices
Preceded by John Farrar	Hollis Chair of Mathematics and Natural Philosophy; 1838–1888	Succeeded by Benjamin Osgood Peirce
