= Wilbur Henry Siebert =

American historian (1866–1961)

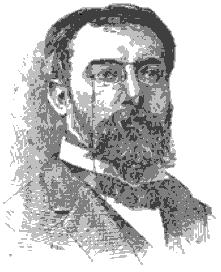
- Born: August 30, 1866; Columbus, Ohio
- Died: September 2, 1961 (aged 95); Columbus, Ohio
- Education: Ohio State University; Harvard University
- Occupations: Educator, historian
- Spouse: Annie W. S. Siebert (m. 1893)

Wilbur Henry Siebert (August 30, 1866 – September 2, 1961) was an American educator and historian. He was a professor at Ohio State University.

== Biography ==
Wilbur Henry Siebert was born in Columbus, Ohio on August 30, 1866, to parents Sarah and Louis Siebert. His grandfather had emigrated from Frankfurt, Germany in 1832.

Siebert graduated from Ohio State University in 1888; from Harvard in 1889; and received his A.M. at Harvard in 1890. He studied in Germany from 1890 to 1891.

In 1898, he became associate professor of European history at Ohio State University, becoming a full professor and chairman of the history department in 1902. He served in this capacity until 1923 when he became a research professor. He was secretary of the university faculty from 1902 to 1906, and acting dean of the College of Arts, Philosophy and Science from 1907 to 1908. He was dean of the graduate school in 1917 and 1918. His father and brothers, who manufactured books, helped fund the Siebert Library of German History at Ohio State.

He also served as a lecturer in history at Ohio Wesleyan University from 1907 to 1908. He traveled in Europe from 1909 to 1910. He was a member of numerous learned and other societies. He was a member of the Congregationalist Church and married Annie Ware Sabine on August 16, 1893.

Wilbur Henry Siebert died at his home in Columbus on September 2, 1961.

== Writings ==
- The Underground Railroad from Slavery to Freedom (1898–99)
- The Government of Ohio (1903)
- Numerous papers relating to the dispersion of the American Loyalists and articles on some other subjects, including a "Report on Collections of Material in English and European History in the Libraries of the United States"
