= Samuel Locke (educator) =

President of Harvard College and American clergyman

The Reverend Samuel Locke

President of Harvard College
- In office 1770–1773
- Preceded by: John Winthrop
- Succeeded by: John Winthrop

Personal details
- Born: November 23, 1732 Woburn, Massachusetts
- Died: January 15, 1778 (aged 45) Sherborn, Massachusetts
- Education: Harvard College

Samuel Locke (November 23, 1732 – January 15, 1778) was an American Congregational clergyman and educator.

== Biography ==
Samuel Locke was born in Woburn, Massachusetts on November 23, 1732. He was the son of Samuel Locke and Rebecca (Richardson) Locke Wilder.

He graduated from Harvard College in 1755, where he was a classmate of future American President and founding father John Adams. He was ordained at Sherburne 7 Nov 1759.

He married Mary Porter on 2 January 1760. Mary was the daughter of Rev. Samuel Porter. Rev. Porter was a predecessor to Rev Locke at Sherburne. They had 3 children (2 sons and a daughter): Dr. Samuel Locke (1761-1788), Mary Locke (1763-1796), and John Locke (1765-1800).

After serving as pastor in Sherborn, Massachusetts, he was appointed president of Harvard College. He held that post from 1770 to 1773, when he resigned after his housemaid became pregnant. He then returned to Sherborn, where he died of apoplexy.

Academic offices
Preceded by John Winthrop, acting	President of Harvard College; 1770–1773	Succeeded by John Winthrop, acting
