= Annie W. S. Siebert =

American artist (1864–1947)

- Born: Anne Ware Sabine; 1864; Cambridge, Massachusetts
- Died: November 7, 1947 (aged 82–83); Columbus, Ohio
- Known for: Painting
- Spouse: Wilbur Henry Siebert (m. 1893)
- Relatives: Wallace Clement Sabine (brother)

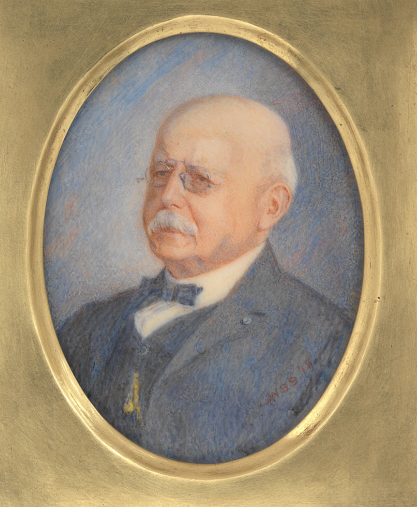
Portrait of Thomas Corwin Mendenhall in the National Portrait Gallery by Annie W. S. Siebert

Annie Ware Sabine Siebert (1864-1947) was an American painter known for her miniature paintings.

== Early life ==
Annie Sabine was born in 1864 in Cambridge, Massachusetts, to Hylas Sabine, a politician, and Annie Ware Sabine. She grew up in Marysville, Ohio, and Richwood, Ohio. Her brother was Wallace Clement Sabine.

She studied at the Ohio State University, where she earned her first degree in 1884 and was the first woman to earn a master of arts degree in 1886. She went on study at the Massachusetts Institute of Technology, where she was the first woman to earn a physics degree in 1888. She also studied art at Harvard University.

== Career ==
She was a member of the Pennsylvania Society of Miniature Painters and exhibited her work at the 1933 Century of Progress World's Fair.

Some of her subjects included:

- Charles W. Eliot
- Washington Gladden
- William Scarlett
- S.C. Derby

== Personal life ==
On August 16, 1893, she married Wilbur Henry Siebert. She had a foster son, John F. Marshall, and a foster daughter, Mrs. Willie L. Howie.

She died on November 7, 1947, at the Ohio State University Wexner Medical Center in Columbus, Ohio, of a coronary occlusion.

== Legacy ==
In 1958 a women's residence hall at Ohio State University was named "Siebert Hall" in her honor.
