= HMS Aldborough (1743) =

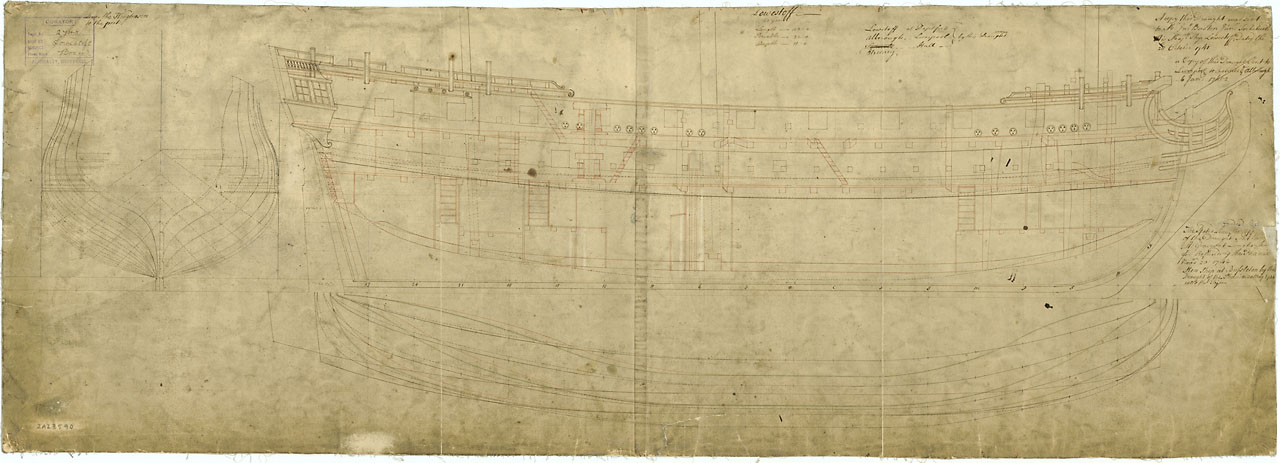
- Plan for the Aldborough

History

Great Britain
- Name: HMS Aldborough
- Ordered: 17 November 1741
- Builder: John Orkill, Liverpool
- Laid down: 6 January 1742
- Launched: 16 March 1743
- Completed: By June 1743
- Commissioned: February 1743
- Fate: Sold out of service, Deptford dockyard, 28 November 1749

General characteristics
- Class & type: 20-gun sixth-rate
- Tons burthen: 498 36/94 bm (Note: Other sources suggest 506 bm)
- Length: 112 ft 0 in (34.1 m) (gundeck); 91 ft 6 in (27.9 m) (keel)
- Beam: 32 ft (9.8 m)
- Depth of hold: 11 ft (3.4 m)
- Propulsion: Sail
- Sail plan: ship-rigged
- Complement: 140
- Armament: 20 × 9-pdrs

HMS Aldborough was a 20-gun sixth-rate ship of the Royal Navy, launched in 1743 and in service in Atlantic and Caribbean waters until 1749.

== Naval career ==
Commissioned in February 1743 under Captain John Pitman, Aldborough was launched in March as part of the British home fleet during the War of Jenkins' Ear. For two years she was assigned patrol and convoy duties from the English Channel to northern Scotland. Former Harvard College professor Isaac Greenwood served as ship's chaplain during this coastal service, from 1743 until his discharge from the Navy on 22 May 1744. From 1744 Aldborough was transferred to the British fleet stationed off South Carolina, protecting British colonies against the risk of Spanish attack. Her captain at this station was Carolinas fleet commander Ashby Utting, late of HMS Looe. However Utting died in January 1746 and Aldborough's captaincy devolved to a more junior officer, Commander Thomas Innes.

In September 1747 the ship was reassigned to the Caribbean, where she remained until 1749. Service in the tropics having reduced her seaworthiness, she was paid off in July 1749 and returned to Deptford Dockyard for repairs. A naval survey in September of that year found that her condition was not salvageable. On 28 November she was sold out of service for £302.

== Bibliography ==
- Colledge, J.J.; Warlow, Ben (2010). Ships of the Royal Navy: The Complete Record of all Fighting Ships of the Royal Navy. Castlemate. ISBN 9781935149071.
- Winfield, Rif (2007). British Warships of the Age of Sail 1714–1792: Design, Construction, Careers and Fates. Seaforth. ISBN 9781844157006.
