= Wallace Clement Sabine =

American acoustic physicist (1868–1919)

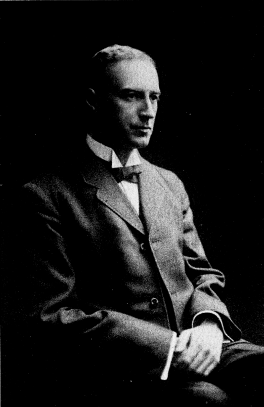
- Photograph of Sabine
- Born: June 13, 1868; Richwood, Ohio, U.S.
- Died: January 19, 1919 (aged 50); Boston, Massachusetts, U.S.
- Education: Ohio State University (AB) Harvard University (AM)
- Children: 2
- Scientific career
- Fields: Acoustics
- Doctoral advisor: John Trowbridge
- Doctoral students: Percy Bridgman
- Relatives: Annie W. S. Siebert (sister)

Wallace Clement Sabine (June 13, 1868 – January 10, 1919) was an American physicist who founded the field of architectural acoustics. Sabine was the architectural acoustician of Boston's Symphony Hall, widely considered one of the two or three best concert halls in the world for its acoustics.

== Early life ==
Wallace Clement Sabine was born on June 13, 1868, in Richwood, Ohio, of Dutch, English, French, and Scottish descent. He graduated with a Bachelor of Arts from Ohio State University in 1886 at the age of 18. He then attended Harvard University and graduated with a Master of Arts in 1888.

His sister was Annie W. S. Siebert.

== Career ==
After graduating, Sabine became an assistant professor of physics at Harvard in 1889. He became an instructor in 1890 and a member of the faculty in 1892. In 1895, he became an assistant professor and in 1905, he was promoted to professor of physics. In October 1906, he became dean of the Lawrence Scientific School, succeeding Nathaniel Shaler.

Sabine's career is the story of the birth of the field of modern architectural acoustics. In 1895, acoustically improving the Fogg Lecture Hall, part of the recently constructed Fogg Art Museum, was considered an impossible task by the senior staff of the physics department at Harvard. (The original Fogg Museum was designed by Richard Morris Hunt and constructed in 1893. After the completion of the present Fogg Museum the building was repurposed for academic use and renamed Hunt Hall in 1935.) The assignment was passed down until it landed on the shoulders of a young physics professor, Sabine. Although considered a popular lecturer by the students, Sabine had never received his PhD and did not have any particular background dealing with sound.

Sabine tackled the problem by trying to determine what made the Fogg Lecture Hall different from other, acoustically acceptable facilities. In particular, the Sanders Theater was considered acoustically excellent. For the next several years, Sabine and his assistants spent each night moving materials between the two lecture halls and testing the acoustics. On some nights they would borrow hundreds of seat cushions from the Sanders Theater. Using an organ pipe and a stopwatch, Sabine performed thousands of careful measurements (though inaccurate by present standards) of the time required for different frequencies of sounds to decay to inaudibility in the presence of the different materials. He tested reverberation time with several different types of Oriental rugs inside Fogg Lecture Hall, and with various numbers of people occupying its seats, and found that the body of an average person decreased reverberation time by about as much as six seat cushions. Once the measurements were taken and before morning arrived, everything was quickly replaced in both lecture halls, in order to be ready for classes the next day.

Sabine was able to determine, through the experiments, that a definitive relationship exists between the quality of the acoustics, the size of the chamber, and the amount of absorption surface present. He formally defined the reverberation time, which is still the most important characteristic currently in use for gauging the acoustical quality of a room, as number of seconds required for the intensity of the sound to drop from the starting level, by an amount of 60 dB (decibels).

His formula is

$$T=\frac{V}{A} \cdot 0.161\,\mathrm{s}$$

where

T = the reverberation time
V = the room volume in m^{3}
A = the effective absorption area in m^{2}

By studying various rooms judged acoustically optimal for their intended uses, Sabine determined that acoustically appropriate concert halls had reverberation times of 2-2.25 seconds (with shorter reverberation times, a music hall seems too "dry" to the listener), while optimal lecture hall acoustics featured reverberation times of slightly under 1 second. Regarding the Fogg Museum lecture room, Sabine noted that a spoken word remained audible for about 5.5 seconds, or about an additional 12-15 words if the speaker continued talking. Listeners thus contended with a very high degree of resonance and echo. Sabine's work was continued by his cousin Paul Earls Sabine at the Riverbank Laboratories from 1919.

Using what he discovered, Sabine deployed sound absorbing materials throughout the Fogg Lecture Hall to cut its reverberation time and reduce the "echo effect." This accomplishment cemented Wallace Sabine's career, and led to his hiring as the acoustical consultant for Boston's Symphony Hall, the first concert hall to be designed using quantitative acoustics. His acoustic design was successful and Symphony Hall is generally considered one of the best symphony halls in the world.

The unit of sound absorption, the Sabin, was named in his honor.

== Personal life ==
Sabine had a wife and two daughters.

== Death ==
Sabine died on January 11, 1919, at his home in Boston, Massachusetts.

== See also ==
- Akoustolith
- Acoustics
- Wallace Clement Sabine Medal of the Acoustical Society of America

Academic offices
Preceded by Benjamin Osgood Peirce	Hollis Chair of Mathematics and Natural Philosophy; 1914–1919	Succeeded by Theodore Lyman
