= Fernwood, Greater Victoria =

Neighborhood in Victoria, British Columbia, Canada

Coordinates: 48.4305°N 123.3451°W

Fernwood Square's four corners

Fernwood is a neighbourhood near downtown Victoria, British Columbia, Canada, bounded by the neighbourhoods of North/South Jubilee, North Park, Fairfield, Rockland, Hillside-Quadra, Oaklands and Harris Green.

== Community ==
The neighbourhood radiates out from the intersection of Gladstone and Fernwood Roads, where the Belfry Theatre sits. The Belfry Theatre has been producing plays in the heart of Fernwood since 1976. A thriving music and arts scene has resulted in events such as FernFest (since 1995), and the Fernwood Art Stroll (since 2008) which take place annually during the fourth weekend in June. Little Fernwood Hall houses The Pandora Arts Collective, Little Fernwood Gallery, and Theatre Inconnu.

The neighbourhood is enlivened by three schools with active extra-curricular programs, community celebrations, and involved Parent Advisory Councils: Victoria High School designed by C.E. Watkins Architect (the oldest public high school west of Winnipeg and north of San Francisco), Central Middle School, and George Jay Elementary. Several registered preschools and day care programs also nurture young families in the area.

The Compost Education Centre, two allotment gardens, and Spring Ridge Commons (a permaculture garden) are community-initiated projects that contribute to the character of the area. Fernwood is also home to many wellness and recreational groups, including the Fernwood Football Association (soccer).

Since 1979, Fernwood Neighbourhood Resource Group (Fernwood NRG) has provided child care, family support programs, and recreational activities through the Fernwood Community Centre. Fernwood NRG opened the Cornerstone Cafe and the Cornerstone Building affordable housing apartments in 2006, and in 2008 opened Park Place affordable housing apartments. In 2013, Fernwood NRG opened Studio 1313 Hair Design. Some of these social enterprises continue to be operated by Fernwood NRG, with all proceeds re-invested into neighbourhood programs and services (including events like FernFest, while other assets have been sold. The Fernwood Community Centre is home to a Community Orchard & Kitchen Garden Pilot Project. These projects demonstrate new ways of growing food in the City of Victoria in visible, public places.

The Fernwood Community Arts Association (FCAA), formerly the Fernwood Community Association (FCA), facilitates land use discussions (between developers, residents, and the city), oversees emergency preparedness and safety issues, operates the two neighbourhood allotment gardens, and provides meeting space in Little Fernwood Hall for various community gatherings and all-ages musical performances.

Fernwood is sometimes known locally as "funky Fernwood", a nickname associated with the neighbourhood's creative character and active community.

The crow is often called the mascot of Fernwood. The 'Fernwood Murder' of crows roosts on Walnut Street before nightfall during the summer and is noted on the Fernwood Community Map.

== History ==
The Fernwood area was part of the territory originally inhabited by the Songhees prior to the establishment of Fort Victoria. It is believed that a Songhees village may have been located at what is today Cadboro Bay. With the establishment of Fort Victoria, a trail linking the fort to Cadboro Bay ran through the area that would become Fernwood and was used by aboriginals and Europeans. Bishop Edward Cridge described the area as it was in the 1850s as "open country without a house or field till we arrived at the Company's farm [Cadboro Bay Farm]".

Early European settlers in the area included John Work, born in Donegal, Ireland who developed the Hillside Farm on the northwest edge of today's Fernwood, and Benjamin Pearse. Pearse owned land between Denman Street and Pandora Avenue, bounded by Fernwood Road on the west and Belmont Avenue on the east. His home, Fernwood Manor, constructed in 1860, gave its name to the neighbourhood. After Pearse's death in 1902, Pearse's second wife, Sarah Jane Pearse resided there until her death in 1954. Fernwood Manor stood at Vining and Begbie Streets for 109 years before its demolition in 1969.

Historically, a spring in Fernwood supplied Victoria with its main source of water, hence the earlier name of the neighbourhood, Springridge. In 1875 Victoria began piping water from Elk Lake, and in 1885, the site of the original springs became the location of the Empire Brewery.

Residential development began in earnest in the 1890s, and many homes in western Fernwood and along Fernwood Road itself date from this era. In the early 1900s a large area west of Fernwood Road was used as a sand and gravel pit to supply construction materials to local builders, to the dismay of many early residents. The problem was partly solved by the construction of the present Victoria High School in 1912 on some of the lands that had been used as the sand and gravel pit.

Central Middle School stands on the site of the first public school, a wood-frame schoolhouse built in 1853 on the colonial school reserve. This building was replaced in 1876 by a building designed by Victoria architect John Teague, who also designed the Dominion Customs House on Wharf Street and Victoria City Hall. In turn, the 1876 school was replaced in 1902 by a brick building designed by Francis Rattenbury. However, the increase in Victoria's population in the early 1900s made this building inadequate within 12 years. The present Central Middle School (formerly Central Junior High School), built in 1952, was designed by the Victoria architectural firm Birley Wade Stockdill.

The commercial heart of Fernwood developed along Fernwood road in the 1890s and early 1900s and many of the commercial buildings in the village date from this time in part due to the intersection of Gladstone road and Fernwood road acting as the terminus of the streetcar line connecting the neighbourhood to downtown. The building now housing the Belfry Theatre was built in 1892 as Emmanuel Baptist Church. Another small commercial node developed along Haultain Road. Most of the Fernwood neighbourhood was built up by the end of the real estate boom of 1913.

From around 1890 until 1947, the area in front of the Emmanuel Baptist Church (now the Belfry Theatre) was the terminus of the streetcar that ran from Downtown to Fernwood, then an outer suburb of town. When the streetcars were removed, following a referendum in 1947, vehicle traffic was allowed to traverse this section of Gladstone, until the early 1970s, when the Fernwood Community Association, led by Paul Phillips, petitioned the city to turn the area into a car-free plaza, which it remains today, as Fernwood Square, or, more technically, as Gladstone Mall. The mixed-use commercial area sprung up around the transit hub in the early 20th century.

Fernwood suffered urban blight in the 1980s and 1990s and attracted street disorder, squatting, and criminality. The building that now hosts Little June was an active squatters' residence in the late 1980s. The neighbourhood began to revitalize in the 1990s, in part thanks to community groups and associations and social investment.

Today, Fernwood Square hosts Fernfest and many other community events. Vic High was significantly remodeled in the early 2020s and now features a synthetic soccer field and five volleyball courts. Alexander Park is the site of the largest leash-optional park in Fernwood, and William Stephenson and Stadacona feature playgrounds and other recreational amenities.
