= Daniel Treadwell =

American inventor (1791–1872)

Daniel Treadwell (October 10, 1791 – February 27, 1872) was an American inventor. Among his most important inventions are a hemp-spinning machine for the production of cordage, and a method of constructing cannon from wrought iron and steel.

== Biography ==
Daniel Treadwell was born on October 10, 1791, in Ipswich, Massachusetts. His first invention, made at an early age, was a machine for making wooden screws. In 1818 he devised a new form of printing press, and in 1819 went to England, where he conceived the idea of a power press. This was completed in a year after his return, and was the first press by which a sheet was printed in North America by other than hand power. It was widely used, and in New York City large editions of the Bible were published by its means.

In 1822, in conjunction with Dr. John Ware, he founded the Boston Journal of Philosophy and the Arts. Treadwell was elected a Fellow of the American Academy of Arts and Sciences in 1823. In 1825 he was employed by the city of Boston to make a survey for the introduction of water, and in 1826 he devised a system of turnouts for railway transportation on a single track.

He completed the first successful machine for spinning hemp for cordage in 1829. Works capable of spinning 1,000 tons a year were erected in Boston in 1831. Machines that he furnished in 1836 to the Charlestown Navy Yard made all the cordage for some time for the U. S. Navy. These machines were used in Canada, Ireland, and Russia. One of them, called a circular hackle or lapper, was generally adopted wherever hemp was spun for coarse cloth.

From 1841 to 1845 Treadwell devised a method for making built-up guns which resembled the process that was subsequently introduced by Sir William Armstrong. He patented it in 1844 through an agent and received government contracts, but the great cost of his cannon prevented a demand for them. He later filed a case against Robert Parrott about the Parrott rifles, but lost it in 1866, with S.D.N.Y. court deciding that his claim was invalidated by a 1843 British patent to John Frith.

From 1834 to 1845, he occupied the chair of Rumford professor at Harvard University. Also, theology was one of his interests; he is fictionalized as the theologian of Tales of a Wayside Inn by Henry Wadsworth Longfellow.

Treadwell died in Cambridge, Massachusetts.

== Works ==
- A Short Account of an Improved Cannon, and of the Machinery and Processes employed in its Manufacture (Cambridge, 1845)
- The Relations of Science to the Useful Arts (Boston, 1855)
- On the Practicability of constructing a Cannon of Great Calibre (Cambridge, 1856)
- On the Construction of Hooped Cannon (a sequel to the foregoing; 1864)
