= G. W. Pierce =

American physicist (1872 to 1956)

George Washington Pierce
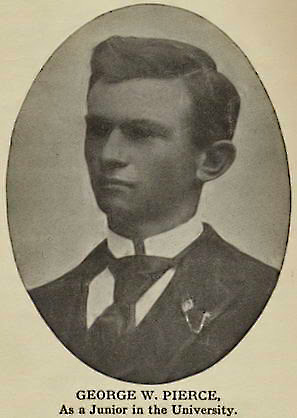
- George Washington Pierce
- Born: January 11, 1872; Webberville, Texas
- Died: August 25, 1956 (aged 84)
- Education: Harvard University
- Known for: Pierce oscillator
- Awards: IEEE Medal of Honor (1929); Franklin Medal (1943)
- Scientific career
- Fields: Physics
- Workplaces: Harvard University
- Doctoral advisor: John Trowbridge
- Doctoral students: Emory Leon Chaffee

George Washington Pierce (January 11, 1872 – August 25, 1956) was an American physicist. He was a professor of physics at Harvard University and inventor in the development of electronic telecommunications.

The son of a Texas cattle rancher, he distinguished himself in school at Taylor and at the University of Texas before beginning his enduring relationship with Harvard in 1898. He wrote three innovative texts, many learned papers, and was assigned 53 patents. The most notable is the single-stage crystal oscillator circuit, which became the touchstone of the electronics communication art. Süsskind says that he was "an exceedingly warm and droll individual, much revered by his students."

== Biography ==
=== Youth ===
G. W. Pierce was born January 11, 1872, in Webberville, Texas. He frequently recalled in later life “drawing water with leaky buckets from deep wells for thirsty mules” as a prod that motivated his intensity in study. At the University of Texas he had Alexander Macfarlane as teacher and mentor: they co-authored a paper for the first volume of the Physical Review. He taught at Dallas High School (1896-7) and worked in the clerk's office of the Bastrop County Court before winning his 1898 scholarship to Harvard. With a thesis on measurement of wavelength of shortwaves, he gained the Ph.D. in 1900. After a European study-tour that included some exposure to Ludwig Boltzmann, he was invited to begin instructing at Harvard. He was instrumental in forming the Wicht Club (1903–1911), a peer-group dedicated to continuing their learning even though teaching.

=== Family ===
G. W. Pierce was the middle son of three. He shared his name with his father, but there seems to have been no use of the traditional Sr. and Jr. appendages. In 1904, he married Florence Goodwin of Saxonville, Massachusetts. Though they produced no offspring, they enjoyed some family life with Cornelia and Walter Cannon, a Harvard Medical School physiologist, who drew the Pierces to Franklin, New Hampshire. For example, Cornelia introduced George to portrait, landscape, and abstract painting. This medium became a strong method of expression for him. Walter and Cornelia’s grandson, Walter Pierce Burgess (born January 08, 1936) would be named after him, going by the name Pierce for his entire life. After Florence died in 1945, Pierce found a second companionship with Helen Russell of Sanbornton, New Hampshire. His first sign of faltering health came with a minor stroke in 1945, but he carried on until a series of major strokes killed him about a decade later. He died on August 25, 1956.

== Professor/Inventor ==
G. W. Pierce had an eye for finding the main sticking point in physical processes. For electronics, he saw that resonance was a key phenomenon. His five-part series "Experiments on resonance in wireless telegraph circuits in Physical Review (1904-7) are evidence of his leadership. By 1910 his first textbook Principles of Wireless Telegraphy was published. It is in this text, and others by John Ambrose Fleming, that the term modulation is first used to describe imprinting an audio wave onto a high-frequency carrier wave by variation of amplitude of the carrier. In 1912 he worked with Arthur E. Kennelly on motional impedance (see below). In 1914, he was assigned the directorship of the Cruft Physics Laboratory at Harvard. Then in 1917 he gained the rank of professor.

The year 1920 saw two important developments: his second text Electric Oscillations and Electric Waves was published. And most significantly, he followed up on an innovation of Walter Guyton Cady of Wesleyan University, using quartz crystal to stabilise the frequency of electrical oscillation. In early attempts, radio communication was severely handicapped by the lack of reliable fixed-frequency operation, and Pierce saw the potential for the quartz-governed circuit. Cady's circuit used multiple triode vacuum tubes, and Pierce was able to reduce this to a single tube. Insights such as this one resulted in patent assignments, for which Pierce then sold license to use, yielding him the capital to purchase vacation homes in Franklin, New Hampshire, and St. Petersburg, Florida.

=== Motional impedance ===
In their laboratory, Pierce and A. E. Kennelly undertook an experiment measuring the change in impedance of telephone receivers over a range of audio frequencies when the diaphragm was clamped by finger or quill insert. At each frequency the receiver resistance and reactance were measured and impedance computed, then the difference of free versus clamped impedance plotted as a complex number, or point in the impedance plane. For every receiver, the range of frequencies yields a series of con-cyclic points. The phenomenon was called "motional impedance" and the circle a "motional impedance circle". This example of circular phenomena in device-impedance became so familiar, eventually, that the Smith Chart was introduced to provide a bounded universe (or chart) for such circles.

=== Later years ===
In 1921, he was made Rumford Professor of Physics; in 1929 he was awarded the Medal of Honor of the Institute of Radio Engineers (I.R.E.). He continued to file patents, and he reported on crystal oscillators in the Proceedings of the American Academy of Arts and Sciences in 1923 and 1925. He retired in 1940, publishing his text Song of Insects in 1943. It made an analysis of the cricket "songs". In the same year, the Franklin Institute awarded him its Franklin Medal.

For a list of publications and patents, see Saunders and Hunt (1959).
