= USCS Benjamin Peirce =

History

United States
- Name: Benjamin Peirce
- Namesake: Benjamin Peirce (1809-1880), American mathematician
- Acquired: 1855
- Commissioned: 1855
- Decommissioned: 1868

General characteristics
- Type: Survey ship (schooner)
- Length: 70 ft (21 m)
- Beam: 20 ft (6.1 m)
- Draft: 2.9 ft (0.88 m)
- Propulsion: Sails
- Sail plan: Schooner-rigged

USCS Benjamin Peirce was a schooner that served as a survey ship in the United States Coast Survey from 1855 to 1868.

The Coast Survey acquired Benjamin Peirce in 1855 and placed her in service along the United States East Coast, where she spent her entire Coast Survey career. She was named for the preeminent American mathematician of the nineteenth century, Benjamin Peirce, who was a friend of the Superintendent of the Coast Survey, Alexander Dallas Bache, and succeeded Bache as Superintendent in 1867.

On the evening of 5 January 1856, Benjamin Peirce was anchored in the St. Johns River off Jacksonville, Florida, when the steamer SS Seminole caught fire at a pier upstream shortly before midnight. Burning from stem to stern, Seminole was cut loose from her moorings so that the flames would not spread to buildings ashore and began to drift down onto Benjamin Peirce. By the time the senior officer aboard Benjamin Peirce, Sailing Master P. R. Hawley, could get her crew on deck, Seminole was only 50 yards (46 meters) away. Leaving half of Benjamin Peirce's men aboard with buckets and axes to prevent flames from spreading to her if Seminole drifted onto her, Hawley took the rest of the men out in a boat to attempt to tow Seminole away from Benjamin Peirce. The boat managed to pull Seminole far enough for her only to strike a glancing blow against Benjamin Peirce, although Seminole passed the survey schooner so closely that the intense heat of the fire destroyed Benjamin Peirce's foresail, mainsail, main gaff-top-sail, starboard main shrouds and main topmast back-stay and some of her running rigging. The flames also charred most of Benjamin Peirce's spars, both of her masts, her starboard bulwarks, her galley, her cabin quarter-house, and her deck, damaged a new boat lying on her deck, and broke the glass in the skylight of her cabin quarter-house. Her main boom fell when the topping lift which supported it was destroyed, and it crushed her taffrail when it fell. Despite this damage, Hawley's quick action had prevented Seminole from becoming entangled with Benjamin Peirce, which probably would have resulted in the destruction of Benjamin Peirce.

With the flames that spread to Benjamin Peirce put out by her crew, Hawley saw that Seminole next would threaten the brig Iza anchored downstream from Benjamin Peirce with a full cargo. Hawley continued to tow Seminole so that she would clear Iza, then went aboard Iza and was given command by the Iza's captain. Hawley and other men from Benjamin Pierce were instrumental in saving Iza and her cargo from burning.

The Coast Survey decommissioned Benjamin Peirce in 1868.
