= Herbert H. D. Peirce =

American diplomat (1849–1914)

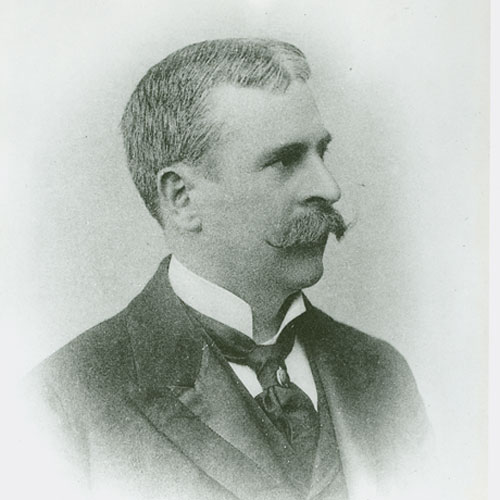

United States Ambassador to Norway
- In office August 13, 1906 – May 30, 1911
- President: Theodore Roosevelt
- Preceded by: Charles H. Graves
- Succeeded by: Laurits S. Swenson

Personal details
- Born: May 11, 1849 Cambridge, Massachusetts, U.S.
- Died: December 5, 1916 (aged 67) Portland, Maine, U.S.
- Relations: Charles S. Peirce (brother); Elijah H. Mills (grandfather)
- Parent: Benjamin Peirce (father)
- Education: Harvard College; Royal School of Mines

Herbert Henry Davis Peirce (May 11, 1849 – December 5, 1916) was an American diplomat who served as Third Assistant Secretary of State from 1901 to 1906 and as U.S. Ambassador to Norway from 1906 to 1911. He is the brother of the philosopher Charles S. Peirce.

== Biography ==
Herbert Henry Davis Peirce was born in Cambridge, Massachusetts, on May 11, 1849, the son of Benjamin Peirce and his wife Sarah, who was a daughter of Elijah H. Mills. He was educated at Harvard College, graduating in 1871. He later studied at the Royal School of Mines in London.

In 1894, Peirce joined the United States Legation in Saint Petersburg as First Secretary, and occasionally acting as Chargé d'affaires. In this capacity, he attended the coronation of Nicholas II of Russia in 1896.

In 1901, President Theodore Roosevelt named Peirce to be Third Assistant Secretary of State and Peirce held this office from November 16, 1901, until June 22, 1906. In this capacity, he made arrangements for the 1905 conference in Portsmouth, New Hampshire, between the Russian Empire and the Empire of Japan at the end of the Russo-Japanese War that resulted in the Treaty of Portsmouth.

President Roosevelt then named Peirce U.S. Minister to Norway. Ambassador Peirce presented his credentials on August 13, 1906, and served there until May 30, 1911.

Peirce retired from the Diplomatic Corps in 1912. He then served as counsel to the United States in American and British claims arbitration.

Peirce died in Portland, Maine, on December 5, 1916.

Government offices
Preceded by Thomas W. Cridler	Third Assistant Secretary of State; November 16, 1901 – June 22, 1906	Succeeded by Huntington Wilson
Diplomatic posts
Preceded by Charles H. Graves	United States Ambassador to Norway; August 13, 1906 – May 30, 1911	Succeeded by Laurits S. Swenson
