= Emory Leon Chaffee =

American physicist

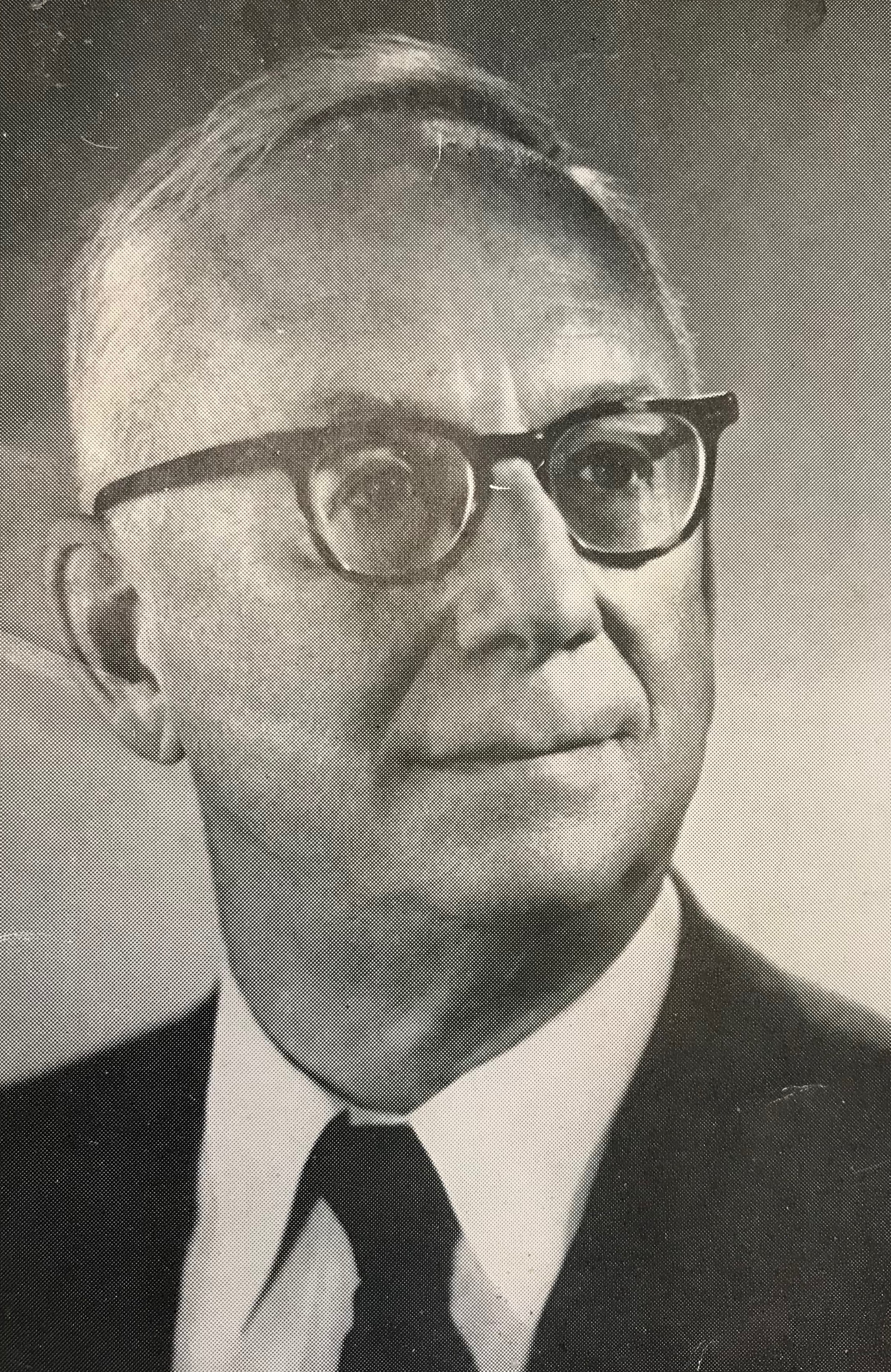
- Born: April 15, 1885; Somerville, Massachusetts
- Died: March 8, 1975 (aged 89); Waltham, Massachusetts
- Education: Harvard University
- Awards: IEEE Medal of Honor (1959)
- Scientific career
- Fields: Physics
- Workplaces: Harvard University
- Doctoral advisor: G. W. Pierce
- Doctoral students: Howard H. Aiken

Emory Leon Chaffee (April 15, 1885 – March 8, 1975) was an American physicist. He was a professor at Harvard University from 1911 to 1953.

Chaffee was born in Somerville, Massachusetts. He studied electrical engineering and received his bachelor's degree from MIT in 1907. Afterward he made further studies at the Harvard University and took his master's degree and his Ph.D.

He was made an instructor in electrical engineering in 1911 and got a position as assistant professor of physics in 1917. In 1923, he became an associate professor and a professor in 1926. He was appointed Rumford Professor of Physics in 1940, and Gordon McKay Professor of applied physics in 1946. Chaffee became chairman of the Department of Engineering Sciences and Applied Physics from 1949 till 1952.

Chaffee was awarded the IEEE Medal of Honor in 1959. He was best known for his work on thermionic vacuum tubes. In 1911, he invented the concept of the Chaffee Gap which was a way of producing continuous oscillations for radio transmissions, and in 1924, he started to work on controlling weather, using aircraft to break up clouds with electrically charged grains of sands.

Chaffee died in Waltham, Massachusetts.
