= Benjamin Osgood Peirce =

American mathematician

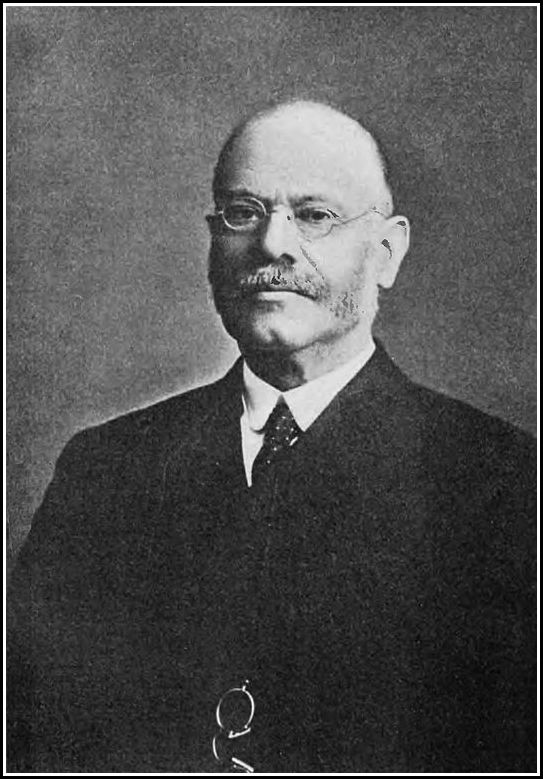
- Peirce in 1914
- Born: February 11, 1854; Beverly, Massachusetts, U.S.
- Died: January 14, 1914 (aged 59); Cambridge, Massachusetts, U.S.
- Resting place: Central Cemetery; Beverly, Massachusetts, U.S.
- Education: Harvard University; Leipzig University (PhD)
- Spouse: Isabella Turnbull Landreth (m. 1882)
- Children: 2
- Scientific career
- Workplaces: Harvard University
- Thesis: Über die Electromotorische Knifte von Gaselemente (1879)
- Doctoral students: William Elwood Byerly

Benjamin Osgood Peirce (February 11, 1854 – January 14, 1914) was an American mathematician and a holder of the Hollis Chair of Mathematicks and Natural Philosophy at Harvard from 1888 until his death in 1914.

== Early life ==
Benjamin Osgood Peirce was born to M. (née Seccomb) and Benjamin Osgood Peirce on February 11, 1854, in Beverly, Massachusetts. In 1876, he graduated from Harvard College. He then received a PhD from the Leipzig University in 1879. He then studied in Berlin, Germany for another year.

== Career ==
Peirce taught at the Boston Latin School for one year. From 1881 to 1884, he taught mathematics at Harvard University. He then taught mathematics and physics as an assistant professor until 1888. In 1888, he became the Hollis Chair of Mathematics and Natural Philosophy.

Pierce was elected to the American Academy of Arts and Sciences in 1884. Peirce was elected to the Council of the American Mathematical Society, serving from 1896 to 1898. He was a founder of the American Physical Society when it began in 1899 and was elected to the National Academy of Sciences (United States) in 1906. He was honored with election to foreign academies such as the Mathematical Circle of Palermo and the French Physical Society. In 1910 he was awarded an honorary degree by Harvard University. That same year, he was elected to the American Philosophical Society. In 1912 he represented Harvard University at the celebrations for the 250th anniversary of the founding of the Royal Society of London.

== Personal life ==
Peirce married Isabella Turnbull Landreth in 1882. Together, they had two daughters.

Removed by several degrees, he was a cousin of Charles Sanders Peirce, whose father, Benjamin Peirce, worked as the academic advisor to Joseph Lovering, Benjamin Osgood Peirce's predecessor as holder of the Hollis Chair of Mathematics and Natural Philosophy.

== Death ==
Peirce died at his home in Cambridge from angina on January 14, 1914. He is buried at the Central Cemetery in Beverly.

== Works ==
A list of all the publications of Benjamin Osgood Peirce:

- (with Edward B Lefavour) "On the effect of armatures on the magnetic state of electromagnets", Proc. Amer. Acad. Arts Sciences 10 (1875), 385–386.
- "On the induction spark produced in breaking a galvanic circuit between the poles of a magnet", Proc. Amer. Acad. Arts Sciences 11 (1875), 218–227.
- "On a new method of comparing the electromotive forces of two batteries and measuring their internal resistance", Proc. Amer. Acad. Arts Sciences 12 (1877), 137–140.
- "On a new method of measuring the resistance of a galvanic battery", Proc. Amer. Acad. Arts Sciences 12 (1877), 140–142.
- "Note on the determination of the law of propagation of heat in the interior of a solid body", Proc. Amer. Acad. Arts Sciences 12 (1877), 143–149.
- (with Edward B Lefavour) "Preliminary work on the determination of the law of propagation of heat in the interior of solid bodies", Proc. Amer. Acad. Arts Sciences 13 (1877), 128–140.
- "Über die Emissionsspectra der Haloid-verbindungen des Quecksilbers", Annalen der Physik und Chemie 242 (4) (1879), 597–599.
- Über die Electromotorische Knifte von Gaselemente (Inaugural dissertation, Leipzig, 1879).
- "On the sensitiveness of the eye to slight differences of color", Amer. J. Sci. (3) 26 (154) (1883), 299–302.
- Elements of the Theory of the Newtonian Potential Function (Ginn & Co., Boston, 1888).
- Elements of the Theory of the Newtonian Potential Function 2nd ed. (Ginn & Co., Boston, 1888).
- (with Robert Wheeler Willson) "On the charging of condensers by galvanic batteries", Proc. Amer. Acad. Arts Sciences 24 (1889), 146–163.
- (with Robert Wheeler Willson) "On the measurement of internal resistance of batteries", Amer. J. Sci. (3) 38 (228) (1889), 465–467.
- Short Table of Integrals (Ginn & Co., Boston, 1889).
- (with William Elwood Byerly) Elements of the Integral Calculus (Ginn & Co., Boston, 1889).
- "On some theorems which connect together certain line and surface integrals", Proc. Amer. Acad. Arts Sciences 26 (1891), 20–23.
- "On some simples cases of electric flow in flat circular plates", Proc. Amer. Acad. Arts Sciences 26 (1891), 218–239.
- "On the properties of batteries formed of cells joined up in a multiple arc", Proc. Amer. Acad. Arts Sciences 30 (1894), 194–199.
- "On the electrical resistances of certain poor conductors", Proc. Amer. Acad. Arts Sciences 30 (1894), 390–395.
- "On the thermo-electric properties of platinoid and manganine", Amer. J. Sci. (3) 48 (286) (1894), 302–306.
- (with Robert Wheeler Willson) "Temperature variation of the thermal conductivities of marble and slate", Amer. J. Sci. (3) 50 (300) (1895), 435–441.
- "On a certain class of equipotential surfaces", Amer. J. Math. 18 (2) (1895), 130–134.
- "On the induction coefficients of hard steel magnets", Amer. J. Sci. (4) 2 (11) (1896), 347–354.
- (with Robert Wheeler Willson) "Table of the first forty roots of the Bessel equation J0(X) = 0 with the corresponding values of J1(X)", Bull. Amer. Math. Soc. 3 (4) (1897), 153–155.
- "On the properties of seasoned magnets made of self-hardening steel", Amer. J. Sci. (4) 5 (29) (1898), 334–342.
- (with Robert Wheeler Willson) "On the thermal conductivities of certain poor conductors I", Proc. Amer. Acad. Arts Sciences 34 (1) (1898), 3-56.
- "The perception of horizontal and vertical lines", Science (September 1899).
- "On the thermal conductivity of vulcanite", Proc. Amer. Acad. Arts Sciences 35 (4) (1899), 75–80.
- (with Robert Wheeler Willson) "On the thermal diffusivities of different kinds of marble", Proc. Amer. Acad. Arts Sciences 36 (2) (1900), 13–16.
- Elements of the Theory of the Newtonian Potential Function 3rd ed. (Ginn & Co., Boston, 1902).
- "On the temperature coefficients of magnets made of chilled cast iron", Proc. Amer. Acad. Arts Sciences 38 (19) (1903), 551–556.
- "On the thermal conductivities of certain pieces of rock from the Calumet and Hecla mine", Proc. Amer. Acad. Arts Sciences 38 (23) (1903), 651–660.
- "On families of curves which are the lines of certain plane vectors, either solenoidal or lamellar", Proc. Amer. Acad. Arts Sciences 38 (24) (1903), 663–678.
- "On the lines of certain classes of solenoidal or lamellar sectors, symmetrical with respect to an axis", Proc. Amer. Acad. Arts Sciences 39 (12) (1903), 295–304.
- "On generalized space differentiation of the second order", Proc. Amer. Acad. Arts Sciences 39 (17) (1904), 377–386.
- "Some elementary theorems concerning the steady flow of electricity in solid conductors", Ann. Math. (2) 5 (4) (1904), 153–168.
- "On the properties of magnets made of hardened cast iron", Proc. Amer. Acad. Arts Sciences 40 (22) (1905), 701–715.
- "On the manner of growth of a current in the coil of a nearly closed electromagnet as influenced by the width of the air-gap", Proc. Amer. Acad. Arts Sciences 41 (24) (1906), 505–540.
- "On the permeability and the retentiveness of a mass of fine iron particles", Proc. Amer. Acad. Arts Sciences 42 (3) (1906), 87–91.
- "On the length of the time of contact in the case of a quick tap on a telegraph key", Proc. Amer. Acad. Arts Sciences 42 (4) (1906), 95–100.
- "On the conditions to be satisfied if the sum of the corresponding members of two pairs of orthogonal functions of two variables are to be themselves orthogonal", Proc. Amer. Acad. Arts Sciences 42 (7) (1906), 149–157.
- "A simple device for measuring the deflections of a mirror galvanometer", Proc. Amer. Acad. Arts Sciences 42 (9) (1906), 173–174.
- "On the correction for the effect of the counter-electromotive force induced in a moving coil galvanometer when the instrument is used ballistically", Proc. Amer. Acad. Arts Sciences 42 (8) (1906), 161–169.
- "On the determination of the magnetic behavior of the finely divided core of an electromagnet while a steady current is being established in the exciting coil", Proc. Amer. Acad. Arts Sciences 43 (5) (1907), 99–182.
- "The damping of the oscillations of swinging bodies by the resistance of the air", Proc. Amer. Acad. Arts Sciences 44 (2) (1908), 63–88.
- "The theory of ballistic galvanometers of long period", Proc. Amer. Acad. Arts Sciences 44 (11) (1909), 283–314.
- "On the magnetic behavior of hardened cast iron and of certain tool steels at high excitations", Proc. Amer. Acad. Arts Sciences 44 (13) (1909), 353–364.
- "On the permeabilities and the reluctivities, for very wide ranges of excitation, of normal specimens of compressed steel, Bessemer steel and Norway iron rods", Amer. J. Sci. (4) 27 (160) (1909), 273–288.
- "On the magnetic properties at high excitations of a remarkably pure specimen of soft Norway iron", Amer. J. Sci. (4) 28 (163) (1909), 1–8.
- "Biography of Joseph Lovering", National Academy of Sciences, Biographical Memoirs 6 (1909), 329–344.
- "The conception of the derivative of a scalar point function with respect to another similar function", Proc. Amer. Acad. Arts Sciences 45 (12) (1910), 339–352.
- "The effect of leakage at the edges upon the temperatures within a homogeneous lamina through which heat is being conducted", Proc. Amer. Acad. Arts Sciences 45 (13) (1910), 355–360.
- "The magnitude of an error which sometimes affects the results of magnetic tests upon iron and steel rings", Proc. Amer. Acad. Arts Sciences 46 (3) (1910), 85–93.
- "The resistivity of hardened cast iron as a measure of its temper and of its fitness for use in permanent magnets", Proc. Amer. Acad. Arts Sciences 46 (8) (1910), 185–204.
- "The magnetic permeabilities at low excitations of two kinds of very pure soft iron", Proc. Amer. Acad. Arts Sciences 46 (9) (1910), 207–212.
- "The effects of sudden changes in the inductances of electric circuits as illustrative of the absence of magnetic lag and of the von Waltcnhofer phenomena in finely divided cores. Certain mechanical analogies of the electrical problems", Proc. Amer. Acad. Arts Sciences 46 (20) (1911), 541–585.
- "The anomalous magnetization of iron and steel", Proc. Amer. Acad. Arts Sciences 47 (17) (1912), 633–670.
- "The maximum value of the magnetization in iron", Proc. Amer. Acad. Arts Sciences 49 (2) (1913), 117–146.
- "The demagnetizing factors of cylindrical rods in high uniform fields", Proc. Amer. Acad. Arts Sciences 50 (3) (1914), 53–64. (completed by John Coulson)
- "The influence of the magnetic characteristics of the iron core of an induction coil upon the manner of establishment of a steady current in the primary circuit", Proc. Amer. Acad. Arts Sciences 50 (7) (1915), 149–168. (completed by John Coulson)

== See also ==
- Benjamin Peirce (1809–1890)

Academic offices
Preceded by Joseph Lovering	Hollis Chair of Mathematics and Natural Philosophy; 1888-1914	Succeeded by Wallace Clement Sabine
