= John Trowbridge (physicist) =

American scientist

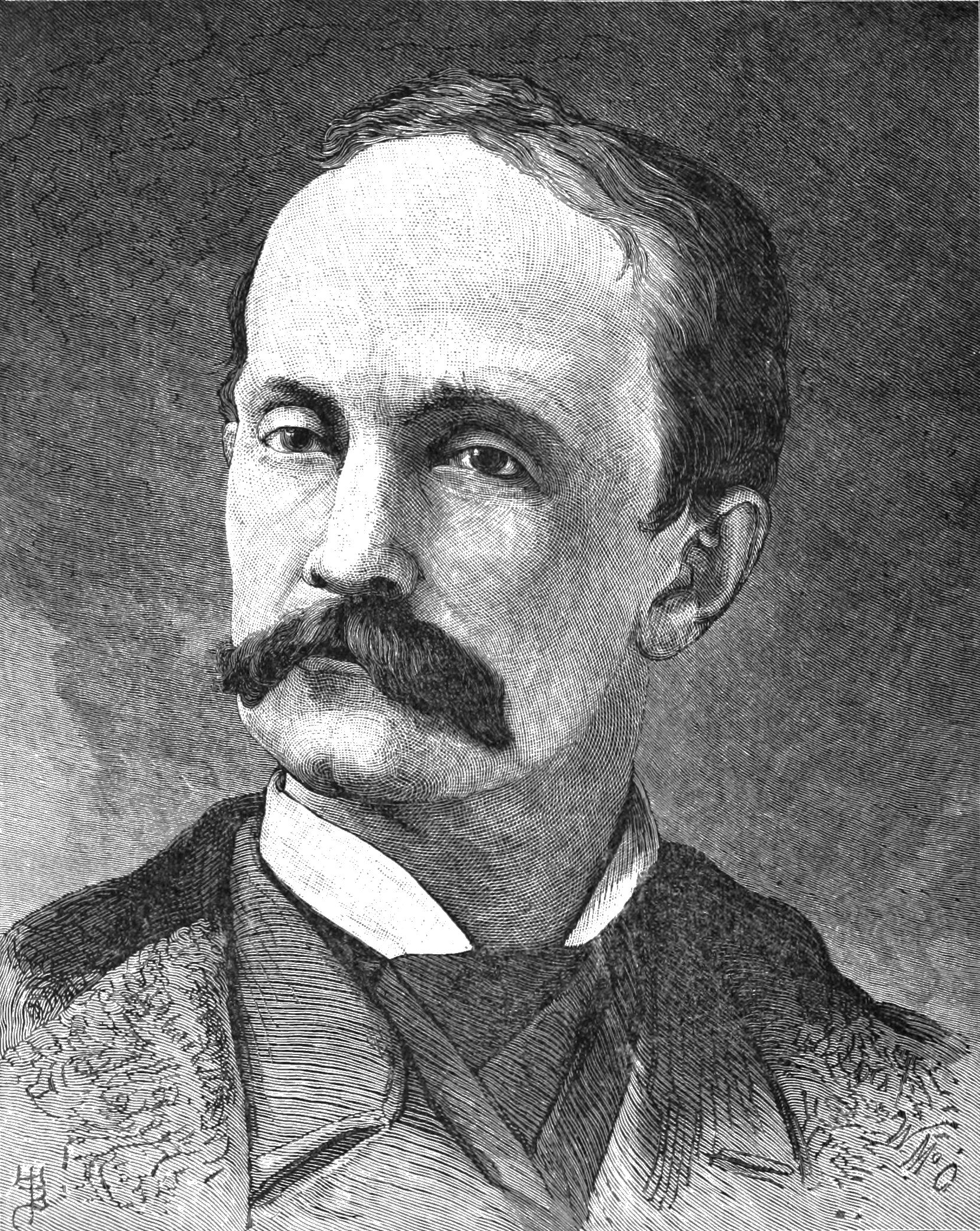
- John Trowbridge (between 1884 and 1885)
- Born: August 5, 1843; Boston, Massachusetts, U.S.
- Died: February 18, 1923 (aged 79); Cambridge, Massachusetts, U.S.
- Education: Harvard University (S.B., S.D.)
- Scientific career
- Fields: Physics
- Workplaces: Harvard University Massachusetts Institute of Technology
- Academic advisors: Joseph Lovering
- Notable students: Benjamin Osgood Peirce Wallace Clement Sabine William Duane

John Trowbridge (August 5, 1843 – February 18, 1923) was an American physicist, noted for his research into electricity and magnetism, and for his innovations in scientific education.

== Early life ==
Born into a long-established New England family, John Trowbridge could trace his roots in Massachusetts and Connecticut back to the early seventeenth century. His father, John Howe Trowbridge, was a graduate of Harvard Medical School, but did not pursue a professional career, having inherited a sufficient fortune to finance a life of ease. Evidently this state of affairs did not last, however, and the younger Trowbridge would later recount that he was obliged to support himself in youth by monetising his talents as a painter. Also an accomplished pianist and writer, a career in arts and letters seemingly beckoned, but pragmatic considerations led him ultimately to pursuit of the sciences.

== Academic career ==
Trowbridge studied physics at the Lawrence Scientific School of Harvard University, graduating with a Bachelor of Science degree in 1865. Thereafter, he taught maths at Harvard (1866–69) and physics at MIT (1870), before his appointment as assistant professor in physics at Harvard in 1870. He was awarded a Doctorate in 1873, under the supervision of Joseph Lovering.

An innovator in scientific education, Trowbridge stressed the importance of a close link between teaching and experimental research. He is widely credited with bringing about a sea change in attitudes towards the teaching of physics at Harvard, and played a major role in establishing the Jefferson Physical Laboratory (1884) albeit Joseph Lovering was to be its first director. In 1888, however, Trowbridge not only succeeded Lovering in this directorship, but also was appointed Rumford Professor of Physics (in succession to Oliver Wolcott Gibbs). He was a member of the National Academy of Sciences from 1878, a member of the American Philosophical Society from 1896, and was President of the American Academy of Arts and Sciences (1908–1916).

Despite heavy teaching and administrative responsibilities, Trowbridge nevertheless published prolifically on his main research topics of electricity and magnetism, including works on the analysis of solar spectra and on the generation of Röntgen radiation (X-rays).

== Personal and later life ==
Trowbridge married Mary Louise Grey (née Thayer) in 1875, and although the couple had no children together he was much loved by his step-daughter Alice. After his wife's death in 1907, and his own retirement in 1910, he devoted himself to the care of his rose garden and to the study of the scientific works of Benjamin Franklin. He died on 18 February 1923, at his home in Cambridge, Massachusetts.
