= John Winthrop (educator) =

American mathematician, physicist and astronomer (1714–1779)

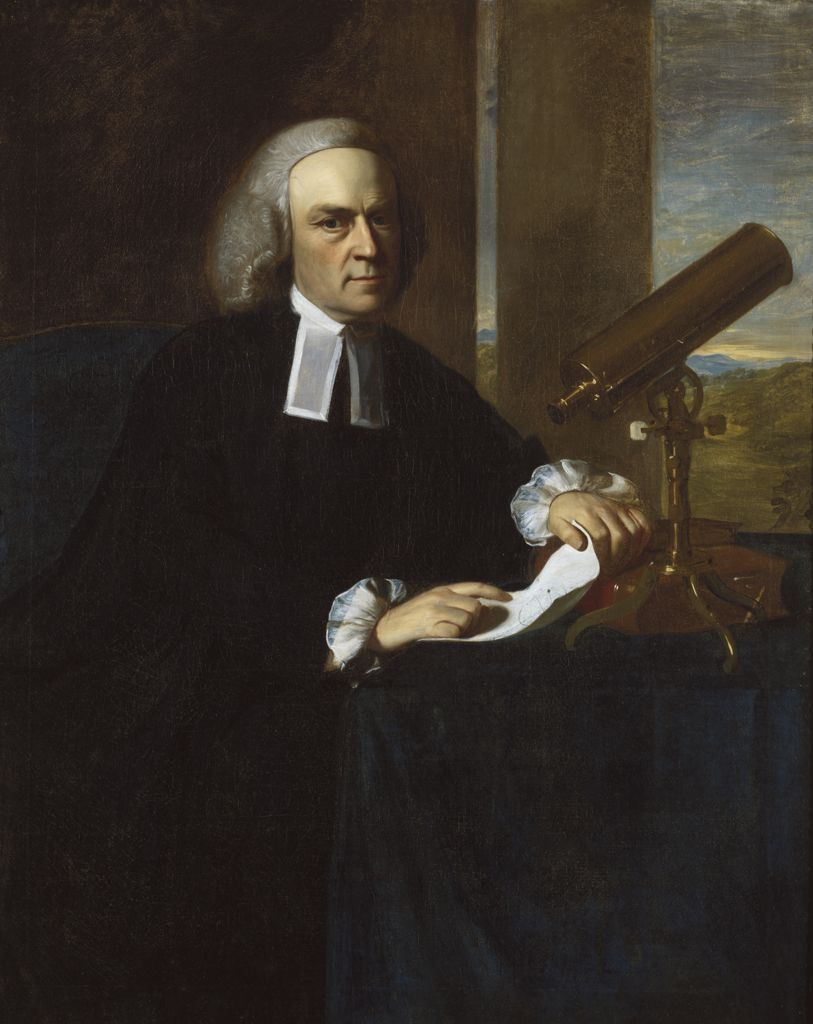
- Portrait by John Singleton Copley, c. 1773

Acting President of Harvard College
- In office 1769–1769
- Preceded by: Edward Holyoke
- Succeeded by: Samuel Locke
- In office 1773–1773
- Preceded by: Samuel Locke
- Succeeded by: Samuel Langdon

Personal details
- Born: December 19, 1714 Boston, Province of Massachusetts Bay
- Died: May 3, 1779 (aged 64) Cambridge, Massachusetts
- Education: Harvard College

John Winthrop (December 19, 1714 – May 3, 1779) was an American mathematician, physicist and astronomer. He was the 2nd Hollis Professor of Mathematics and Natural Philosophy in Harvard College.

== Early life ==
John Winthrop was born in Boston, Massachusetts. His great-great-grandfather, also named John Winthrop, was founder of the Massachusetts Bay Colony. He graduated in 1732 from Harvard, where, from 1738 until his death, he served as professor of mathematics and natural philosophy.

== Career ==
Professor Winthrop was one of the foremost men of science in America during the 18th century, and his impact on its early advance in New England was particularly significant. Both Benjamin Franklin and Benjamin Thompson (Count Rumford) probably owed much of their early interest in scientific research to his influence. He also had a decisive influence in the early philosophical education of John Adams during the latter's time at Harvard. He corresponded regularly with the Royal Society in London—as such, he was one of the first American intellectuals to be taken seriously in Europe. He was elected to the revived American Philosophical Society in 1768. He was noted for attempting to explain the great Lisbon earthquake of 1755 as a scientific—rather than religious—phenomenon, and his application of mathematical computations to earthquake activity following the great quake formed the basis of the claim made on his behalf as the founder of the science of seismology. Additionally, he observed the transits of Mercury in 1740 and 1761 and journeyed to Newfoundland to observe a transit of Venus. He traveled in a ship provided by the Province of Massachusetts—probably the first scientific expedition ever sent out by any incipient American state.

He began taking daily meteorological observations in 1742, at first using whatever instruments were available in Boston, but in 1759 switching to two Fahrenheit thermometers which were compared against each other, a standard which has allowed for useful understanding of the climate of Boston in this time. Winthrop's data predates the first Canadian temperature measurements in 1765, and later American measurements which began in the 1770s.

He served as acting president of Harvard in 1769 and again in 1773, but each time declined the offer of the full presidency on the grounds of old age. During the nine months in 1775–1776 when Harvard moved to Concord, Massachusetts, Winthrop occupied the house that would become famous as The Wayside, home to Louisa May Alcott and Nathaniel Hawthorne. Additionally, he was actively interested in public affairs, was for several years a judge of probate in Middlesex County, was a member of the Governor's Council in 1773–74, and subsequently offered the weight of his influence to the patriotic cause in the Revolution. He published:

- Lecture on Earthquakes (1755)
- Answer to Mr. Prince's Letter on Earthquakes (1756)
- Account of Some Fiery Meteors (1755)
- Two Lectures on the Parallax (1769)

== Personal life ==
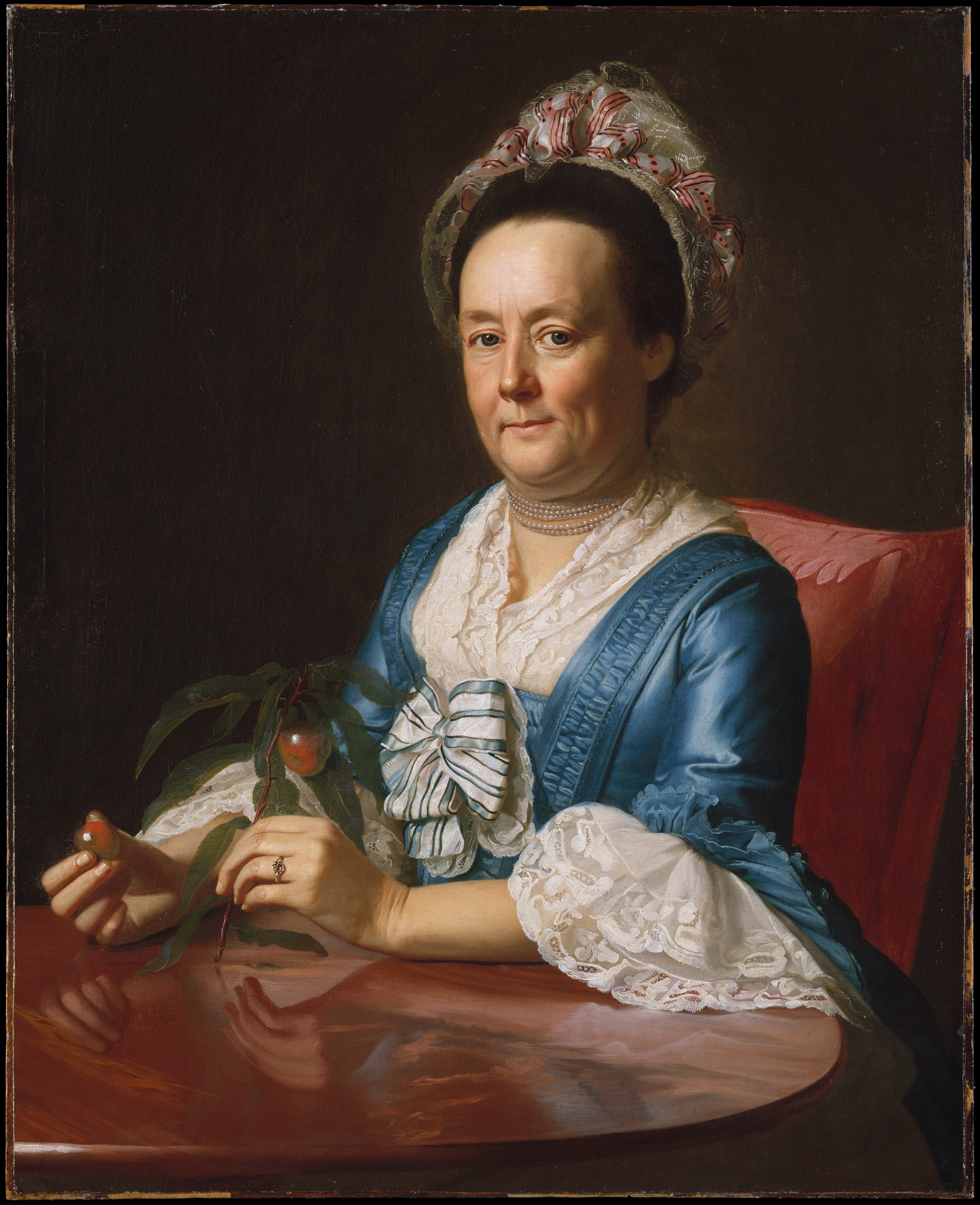
A painting of his wife, Hannah Fayerweather Winthrop, by John Singleton Copley (1773)

In 1756, he married Hannah Fayerweather (1727–1790), the daughter of Thomas and Hannah Waldo Fayerweather. She was baptized at the First Church in Boston on February 12, 1727, and had been previously married in 1745 to Parr Tolman. Together, they raised Winthrop's son from his previous marriage, James Winthrop, who continued his father's political work.

Winthrop was recorded as owning two enslaved men, George and Scipio, in 1759 and 1761 respectively.

Academic offices
Preceded by Edward Holyoke	President of Harvard College acting 1769	Succeeded by Samuel Locke
Preceded by Samuel Locke	President of Harvard College acting 1773	Succeeded by Samuel Langdon
Preceded by Isaac Greenwood	Hollis Chair of Mathematics and Natural Philosophy; 1737–1779	Succeeded by Samuel Williams
