= Benjamin Peirce (librarian) =

American politician

- Born: 30 September 1778; Salem, Massachusetts, U.S.
- Died: 26 July 1831 (aged 52)
- Occupation: Librarian
- Employer: Harvard Library
- Spouse: Lydia R. Nichols
- Children: 4, including Benjamin

Benjamin Peirce (30 September 1778 – 26 July 1831) was a librarian of the Harvard Library from 1826 to 1831.

== Early life and education ==
Peirce was born in Salem at 30 September 1778. He was the son of Jerahmeel and Sarah (Ropes) Peirce. After graduating from Harvard College at the head of the class of 1801, he returned to Salem and entered the India trade with his father. He was a representative to the Massachusetts General Court from Salem for several years and a Massachusetts State Senator from Essex County in 1811.

== Career ==
Neither mercantile nor political life satisfied Peirce. In 1826 he accepted the position of Librarian at Harvard. He oversaw preparation of a catalogue of the Library which was published in 1830-31 in four volumes: the first two containing an alphabetical catalogue by authors, the third a systematic index, and the fourth a catalogue of maps.

On 26 July 1831, shortly after the last volume of the catalog was published, Peirce died aged 53. He left in manuscript part of a History of Harvard University, from its foundation, in the year 1636, to the period of the American Revolution. This was edited by his friend John Pickering, and published in 1833 (Cambridge; Brown, Shattuck and Company. 8°. pp. XX., 316, 160). Quincy, in his History of Harvard, describes the book as "of great merit and usefulness, possessing the traits of that soundness of judgment and accuracy of investigation so eminently his characteristics." He also published an Oration delivered at Salem, 4th of July, 1812.

== Personal life ==
He married, 11 December 1803, Lydia R. Nichols. His son Benjamin Peirce was a distinguished mathematician, and for many years Perkins professor of astronomy and mathematics. One of his three other children, Charles Henry Peirce was a physician in Salem and Cambridge.
