= Michael Tinkham =

American physicist (1928–2010)

- Born: February 23, 1928; Green Lake County, Wisconsin, U.S.
- Died: November 4, 2010 (aged 82); Portland, Oregon, U.S.
- Education: MIT
- Spouse: Mary Tinkham
- Children: Jeffrey Michael Tinkham, Christopher Gillespie Tinkham. Grandchildren: Adeline Tinkham, Alden Tinkham, Kyle Tinkham.
- Awards: Oliver E. Buckley Condensed Matter Prize (1974); Fred E. Saalfeld Award for Outstanding Lifetime Achievement in Science (2005)
- Scientific career
- Fields: Condensed Matter Physics
- Workplaces: University of California, Berkeley; Harvard University
- Doctoral advisor: M. W. P. Strandberg

Michael Tinkham (February 23, 1928 – November 4, 2010) was an American physicist. He was Rumford Professor of Physics and Gordon McKay Research Professor of Applied Physics at Harvard University. He is best known for his work on superconductivity.

== Professional life ==
Tinkham was born and raised in Brooklyn Township, a farming community in Green Lake County, Wisconsin. He studied nearby at Ripon College in Wisconsin, where he obtained a BA in 1951. He continued at the Massachusetts Institute of Technology, achieving a Master's in 1951, followed by a PhD in 1954. During 1954–55 he worked in the Clarendon Laboratory at the University of Oxford. In 1955 he moved to the University of California, Berkeley, in becoming an assistant professor in 1957, with a full professorship later. In 1966 he joined the faculty at Harvard University as full professor. During 1978–79 he was a Humboldt U.S. Senior Scientist at the University of Karlsruhe.

Tinkham's research concentrated on superconductivity and in 1975 he published one of the classic textbooks on the subject. Later he focused on material properties where sample dimensions are in the nanometer range, including studies of nanowires and carbon nanotubes.

In 1970 Tinkham was made a member of the National Academy of Sciences, and in 1974 was awarded the Oliver E. Buckley Condensed Matter Prize. He received the Fred E. Saalfeld Award for Outstanding Lifetime Achievement in Science in 2005. He has also been honored for his achievements by his colleagues in the Journal of Superconductivity.

Tinkham maintained an active research group at Harvard University until his retirement. Over these years, he trained over 45 students who received their PhDs under his guidance.

== Work on superconductivity ==
In 1956, Tinkham and a fellow postdoc Rolfe Glover found the direct evidence of an energy gap in the continuous distribution of energy levels in the form of a sharp rise in the optical absorption spectrum of a superconductor. The absorption spectrum observed was a direct consequence of the coherence factors of BCS theory due to John Bardeen, Leon Cooper, and John Robert Schrieffer; along with other observations, it provided the first substantive experimental confirmation of BCS theory.

Tinkham also studied the macroscopic quantum behaviour of superconductors, and examined the conditions under which transitions between different energy levels happen when superconductors are carrying a current.
