= Benjamin Peirce =

American mathematician (1809–1880)

Benjamin Peirce ForMemRS HonFRSE
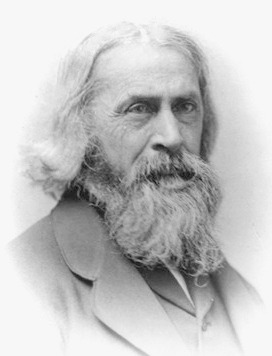
- Peirce c. 1870
- Born: April 4, 1809; Salem, Massachusetts, U.S.
- Died: October 6, 1880 (aged 71); Cambridge, Massachusetts, U.S.
- Spouse: Sarah Hunt Mills
- Children: 5, including Charles, Herbert, and James
- Father: Benjamin Peirce
- Scientific career
- Education: Harvard University
- Known for: Peirce's criterion for outliers (statistics); Definition of mathematics as the science of necessary truths; linear algebras; celestial mechanics
- Fields: Mathematics; statistics; science policy
- Workplaces: Harvard University; Superintendent of the United States Coast Survey
- Academic advisors: Nathaniel Bowditch
- Notable students: Joseph Lovering; C. S. Peirce; Simon Newcomb

Benjamin Peirce (/ˈpɜːrs/; April 4, 1809 – October 6, 1880) was an American mathematician who taught at Harvard University for approximately 50 years. He made contributions to celestial mechanics, statistics, number theory, algebra, and the philosophy of mathematics.

== Early life ==
Benjamin Peirce was born in Salem, Massachusetts, the son of first cousins Benjamin Peirce (1778–1831), later librarian of Harvard, and Lydia Ropes Nichols Peirce (1781–1868).

After graduating from Harvard University in 1829, Peirce taught mathematics for two years at the Round Hill School in Northampton, and in 1831 was appointed professor of mathematics at Harvard. He added astronomy to his portfolio in 1842, and remained as Harvard professor until his death. In addition, he was instrumental in the development of Harvard's science curriculum, served as the college librarian, and was director of the United States Coast Survey from 1867 to 1874. In 1842, he was elected as a member of the American Philosophical Society. He was elected a Foreign Member of the Royal Society of London in 1852.

== Research ==
Peirce is often regarded as the earliest American scientist whose research was recognized as world class. He was an apologist for slavery, opining that it should be condoned if it was used to allow an elite to pursue scientific enquiry.

=== Mathematics ===
In number theory, he proved there is no odd perfect number with fewer than four prime factors.

In algebra, he was notable for the study of associative algebras. He first introduced the terms idempotent and nilpotent in 1870 to describe elements of these algebras, and he also introduced the Peirce decomposition.

In the philosophy of mathematics, he became known for the statement that "Mathematics is the science that draws necessary conclusions". Peirce's definition of mathematics was credited by his son, Charles Sanders Peirce, as helping to initiate the consequence-oriented philosophy of pragmatism. Like George Boole, Peirce believed that mathematics could be used to study logic. These ideas were further developed by his son Charles, who noted that logic also includes the study of faulty reasoning. In contrast, the later logicist program of Gottlob Frege and Bertrand Russell attempted to base mathematics on logic.

=== Statistics ===
Peirce proposed what came to be known as Peirce's Criterion for the statistical treatment of outliers, that is, of apparently extreme observations. His ideas were further developed by his son Charles.

Peirce was an expert witness in the Howland will forgery trial, where he was assisted by his son Charles. Their analysis of the questioned signature showed that it resembled another particular handwriting example so closely that the chance of such a match occurring at random, i.e. by pure coincidence, was extremely small.

== National Academy of Sciences ==
Peirce was named in the Act of Congress incorporating the National Academy of Sciences, approved March 3, 1863, and was therefore one of its charter members. The NAS online member directory records his election year as 1863 and lists his membership type as “Resigned,” the basis of which is unclear.

== Private life ==
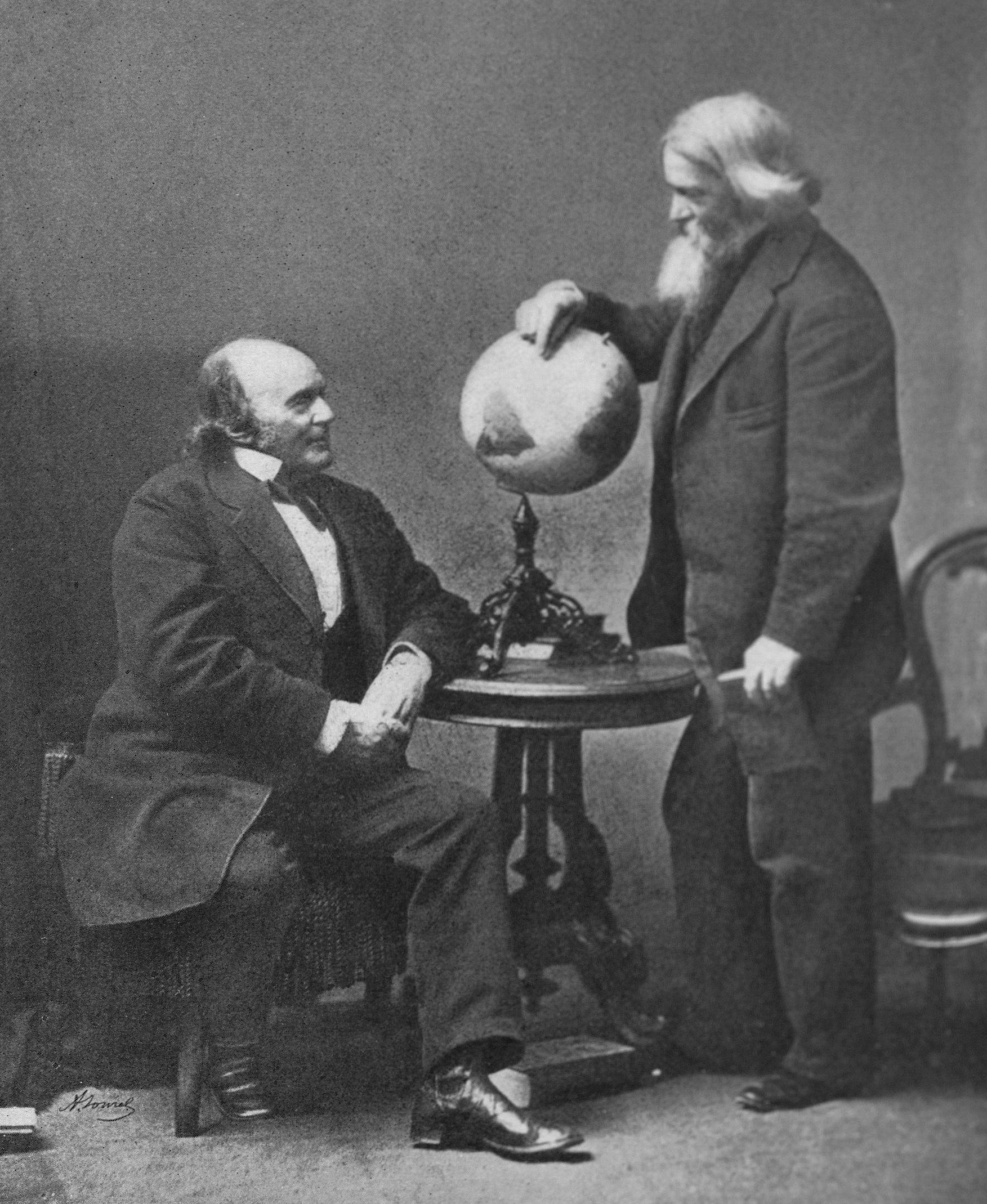
With Louis Agassiz

Peirce was devoutly religious, though he seldom published his theological thoughts. He credited God as shaping nature in ways that account for the efficacy of pure mathematics in describing empirical phenomena. Peirce viewed "mathematics as study of God's work by God's creatures", according to an encyclopedia. He was an avid juggler of diabolo and wrote about the physics of the game in Analytic Mechanics.

He married Sarah Hunt Mills, the daughter of U.S. Senator Elijah Hunt Mills. Peirce and his wife had four sons and one daughter:

- James Mills Peirce (1834–1906), who also taught mathematics at Harvard and succeeded to his father's professorship,
- Charles Sanders Peirce (1839–1914), a famous logician, polymath and philosopher,
- Benjamin Mills Peirce (1844–1870), who worked as a mining engineer before an early death,
- Helen Huntington Peirce Ellis (1845–1923), who married William Rogers Ellis, and
- Herbert Henry Davis Peirce (1849–1916), who pursued a career in the Foreign Service.

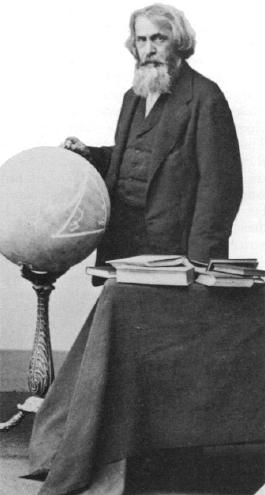

== Eponyms ==
The lunar crater Peirce is named for Peirce, as well as the asteroid 29463 Benjaminpeirce.

Post-doctoral positions in Harvard University's mathematics department are named in his honor as Benjamin Peirce Fellows and Lecturers.

The United States Coast Survey ship USCS Benjamin Peirce, in commission from 1855 to 1868, was named for him.

== Works ==
- An Elementary Treatise on Plane and Spherical Trigonometry, Boston: James Munroe and Company. Google Eprints of successive editions 1840–1862.
- Physical and Celestial Mechanics, Boston: Little, Brown and Company. Google Eprint of 1855 edition.
- Linear Associative Algebra, lithograph by Peirce 1872. New edition with corrections, notes, and an added 1875 paper by Peirce, plus notes by his son Charles Sanders Peirce, published in the American Journal of Mathematics v. 4, 1881, Johns Hopkins University, pp. 221–226, Google Eprint and as an extract, D. Van Nostrand, 1882, Google Eprint.
- 1872: A System of Analytical Mechanics, David van Nostrand & Company, link from Internet Archive

== See also ==
- Benjamin Osgood Peirce (1854–1914)
- Tachytrope, curve in which the law of the velocity is given. Developed by Peirce.

== Notes ==
Government offices
Preceded by Alexander Dallas Bache	Superintendent, United States Coast Survey; 1867–1874	Succeeded by Carlile Pollock Patterson
