= Benjamin Pearse =

Canadian politician

Benjamin William Pearse
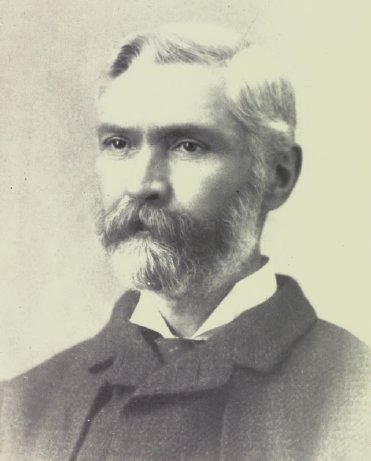
- Born: January 19, 1832; Marylebone, London, England
- Died: June 17, 1902 (aged 70); Victoria, British Columbia, Canada

Benjamin William Pearse (January 19, 1832 – June 17, 1902) was a public servant for the colonies of Vancouver Island and of British Columbia. Pearse served on the Executive Council, which was the interim government in British Columbia after it joined the Dominion of Canada.

Born in London, Pearse left England in 1851 to become a surveyor for the Hudson's Bay Company at Fort Victoria on Vancouver Island. In 1855, he became a public servant and entered the employ of Vancouver Island. He became acting surveyor-general of Vancouver Island in 1859 and received the post permanently from 1864 to 1866, when Vancouver Island was united with British Columbia. In this capacity, he was a member of the colonial legislative and executive councils. He would also later serve as the surveyor-general and chief commissioner of lands and works for the united province from August 1871 to October 1872.

He resigned from his posts as surveyor-general and chief commissioner of lands and works of British Columbia in 1872 to become the head of the British Columbia Department of Public Works, a post which he would retain until 1880. Allegations were brought against Pearse in May 1879 in the House of Commons of Canada by MPs Thomas Robert McInnes and Arthur Bunster over the construction of the British Columbia Penitentiary. Though Pearse was found innocent of charges in an official investigation, they contributed to his resignation in July 1880. They were not the first charges of land abuse brought against Pearse; previously, allegations were made that Pearse had profited from the sale of territory during the Fraser Canyon Gold Rush.

Pearse had other varied interests as well. In 1855, he became a member of the first Canadian musical ensemble west of the Rocky Mountains. He was also closely tied with Britain politically and philosophically, and helped to form a branch of the British Empire Navy League in Victoria. Pearse was one of the earliest settlers of the Fernwood neighborhood in Victoria as well.

Pearse died on June 17, 1902, of cancer in Victoria, British Columbia. He left money to a wide variety of philanthropic organizations and other facilities, notably contributing to Victoria College and helping to bring about the foundation of the school's board of governors.
