= Hollis Chair of Mathematicks and Natural Philosophy =

Endowed professorship at Harvard College

The Hollis Chair of Mathematicks and Natural Philosophy [sic] is an endowed professorship established at Harvard College in 1727 by Thomas Hollis. The chair, now part of the Physics Department, is the second oldest at Harvard, and the oldest professorship in science in the United States.

The spelling of the title of the chair has been retained since its establishment. The original Rules and Orders relating to the chair are still extant.

The incumbents have been:

- Isaac Greenwood (1727–1737)
- John Winthrop (1737–1779)
- Samuel Williams (1779–1789)
- Samuel Webber (1789–1806)
- John Farrar (1807–1838)
- Joseph Lovering (1838–1888)
- Benjamin Osgood Peirce (1888–1914)
- Wallace Clement Sabine (1914–1919)
- vacant (January 1919–September 1921)
- Theodore Lyman (1921–1926)
- Percy Williams Bridgman (1926–1950)
- John Hasbrouck Van Vleck (1951–1969)
- Andrew Gleason (1969–1992)
- Bertrand Halperin (1992–2018)
- Cumrun Vafa (2018–2026)
- Laura DeMarco (2026–present)
