= William Elwood Byerly =

American mathematician (1849–1935)

William Elwood Byerly (13 December 1849 – 20 December 1935) was an American mathematician. He was the Perkins Professor of Mathematics at Harvard University. He was noted for his excellent teaching and textbooks. Byerly was the first to receive a Ph.D. from Harvard, and Harvard's chair "William Elwood Byerly Professor in Mathematics" is named after him. Byerly Hall in Radcliffe Yard, Radcliffe Institute for Advanced Study, Harvard University is also named for him.

== Textbooks ==
Among the textbooks he wrote are:

- Elements of the Differential Calculus (1879)
- Harmonic Functions (1906)
- Problems in Differential Calculus
- Introduction to the Calculus of Variations (1917)
- Elements of the Integral Calculus (1881)
- An Elementary Treatise on Fourier's Series (1893)
- An Introduction to the Use of Generalized Coordinates in Mechanics and Physics (1916)
