= Gargantua =

1534 novel by François Rabelais

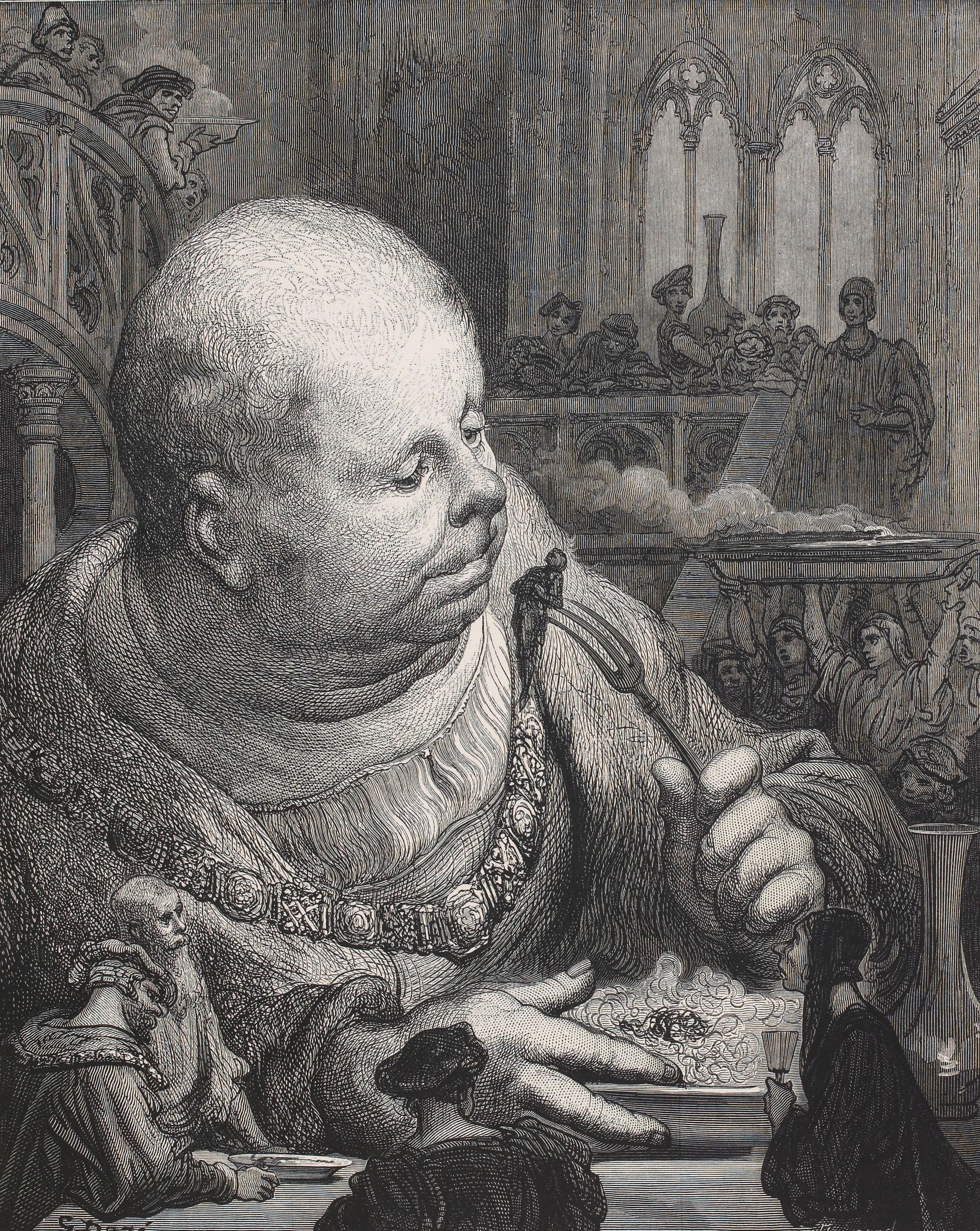
- Pèlerins mangés en salade, scene from chapter 38 of Gargantua imagined by Gustave Doré (engraving, 1873).
- Author: François Rabelais
- Genre: Novel
- Publication place: Kingdom of France

La vie tres horrifique du grand Gargantua, père de Pantagruel jadis composée par M. Alcofribas abstracteur de quinte essence. Livre plein de Pantagruelisme according to François Juste's 1542 edition, or simply Gargantua, is the second novel by François Rabelais, published in 1534 or 1535.

Similar in structure to Pantagruel (1532), but written in a more complex style, it recounts the years of apprenticeship and the warlike exploits of the giant Gargantua. A plea for a humanist culture against the ponderousness of a rigid Sorbonnard education, Gargantua is also a novel full of verve, lexical richness, and often crude writing.

Rabelais published Gargantua under the same pseudonym as Pantagruel: Alcofribas Nasier (an anagram of François Rabelais), "abstractor of quinte essence".

== Summary ==
=== Prologue ===
The novel opens with an appeal to the reader to be benevolent, announcing the comic nature of the work. This exhortation was prompted by the hostility of ecclesiastical authorities towards Rabelais after the publication of Pantagruel, and more generally towards evangelicals in general. Using paradox, the narrator Alcofribas first urges us not to rely on the comic dimension of the story, but to interpret it in a higher sense, and warns against allegorical readings.

The prologue can be read as an invitation to a plural, ambivalent, and open reading of the work or as an illustration of the rhetorical device of captatio benevolentiae, unambiguously inviting the reader to seek a univocal meaning behind the folly and obscurity of the text.

=== A fun-loving, humanist youth ===
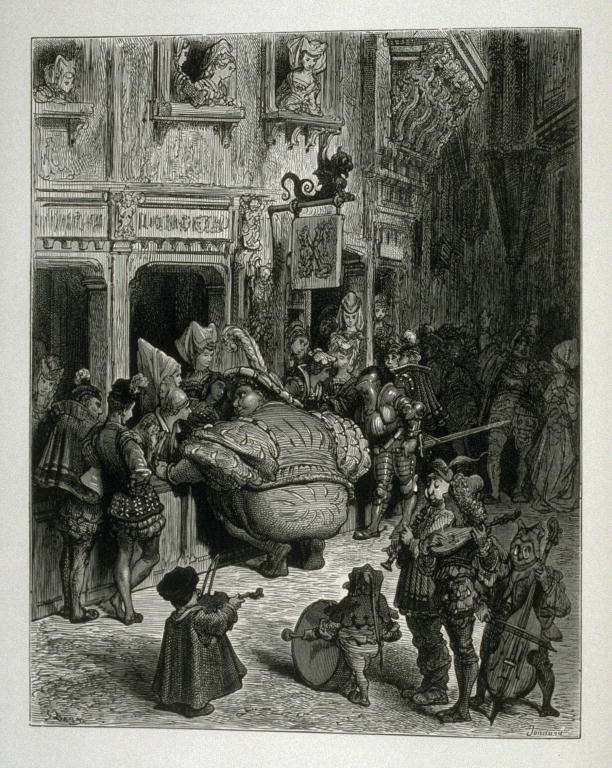
Illustration of Gargantua by Gustave Doré (1873).

==== Genealogy, birth, first name ====
The narrator traces Gargantua's genealogy via an abalone-bark manuscript found by a peasant. As with Pantagruel, the tendency of nobles to invent prestigious ancestors for themselves, or of historians to trace royal lineages back to the earliest times, is mocked: “Et pour vous donner à entendre moy qui parle, je cuyde que soye descendu de quelque riche roy ou prince au temps jadis”. Rabelais' target here is Lemaire de Belges, who asserts in his Chroniques that the Franks are descended from the Trojans.

In the second chapter, a poem entitled Les franfreluches antidotées appears as a fragmentary and obscure text added at the end of the fictitious manuscript, which the narrator claims to have supplied out of “reverence for antiquaille”. This chapter still resists interpretation, despite its obvious references to the political news of the time. Barely comprehensible stanzas refer to the Diet of Nuremberg, the repression of heretics, or the Peace of the Ladies, with Marguerite of Austria, Charles V's aunt, pejoratively referred to as Penthesilea, Queen of the Amazons.

Gargantua was born, after an eleven-month pregnancy, of the union of Grangousier and Gargamelle, daughter of the king of the Parpaillons, during a sumptuous banquet at which the guests made incoherent remarks. Gargantua is born strangely. After Gargamelle eats too much tripe, she is given an astringent that causes Gargantua to be born through his left ear, enabling Rabelais to describe Gargantua's entire journey through his mother's body. He then immediately calls for a drink. This obstetrical fiction, which blends technical medical vocabulary (“cotyledons of the womb”) and trivial expressions, plays with the scientific knowledge of the time, with the abundant discharge of the birth announcing a risk of miscarriage. It also evokes a popular legend according to which Jesus Christ came out of his mother's ear upon hearing the words of the angel Gabriel. His father, on discovering his son crying out for a drink, exclaims: “How big you are! This is why the child is christened “Gargantua”. It took the milk of no less than 17,913 cows to feed him.

The description of the giant's clothing, with its excessive and sometimes outrageous character, makes a mockery of the epic motif of the hero's equipment. It dwells on the absurd detail of a fly, at the time a pocket attached to the top of the boots. Described as a cornucopia and set with emeralds, the symbol of Venus according to Pierio Valeriano Bolzano, celebrates reproductive power. Likewise, the hat's feather refers to Christian charity. Behind the profusion and materials required for the giant's attire, the ornament represents a set of humanist and religious ideals. Gargantua is dressed in white and blue, the two colors of his father's coat of arms. The narrator is polemical about the symbolism of colors since ancient times. He asserts that white symbolizes joy and blue celestial realities.

==== Childhood and education ====
===== A misguided intelligence =====
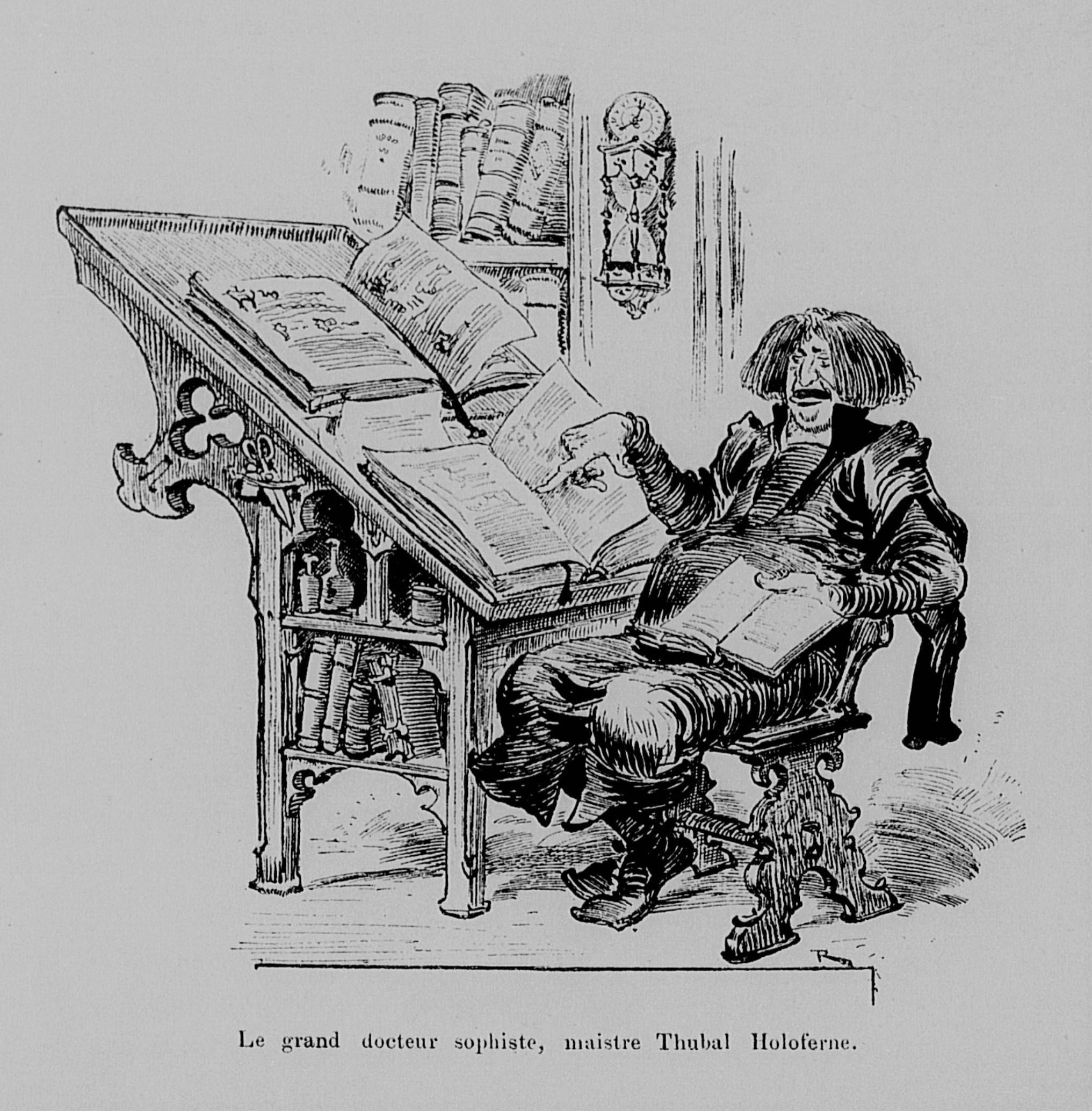
Portrait of Gargantua's tutor, Thubal Holoferne, by Albert Robida (1885)

From the age of three to five, Gargantua knows no restraint: he drinks, eats, sleeps, chases butterflies, and rolls in garbage as he pleases. He is given a wooden horse to make him a good rider, and when the Seigneur de Painensac asks him where the stable is, he takes him to his room. He shows him the mounts he has made, multiplying the puns. His quick wit astonishes his father, back from battle, who poetically explains in a “propos torcheculatif” composed of epigrams and a scatological rondeau, how he discovered the best possible torchecul after testing numerous accessories, plants, and animals. Gargantua concludes his comparison of toilet paper by saying that it's “an oyzon bien dumeté, pourveu qu'on luy tienne la teste entre les jambes”.

Gargantua's wild behavior, with its unbridled instincts, illustrates in part Erasmus's ideas, which encourage people to not neglect the education of small children. Nevertheless, it also reflects Rabelais' amused wonder at the human body.

With his son's lack of education leading him astray, Grandgousier decides to entrust him to a tutor, a renowned sophist named Thubal Holoferne. To teach him literature, Holoferne teaches him to recite scholastic texts by heart, forwards, and backward. The formalism and insignificance of Modist grammar are mocked. Stricken with the pox, the preceptor dies and is replaced by an equally incompetent teacher, Jobelin Bridé. The king realizes that Gargantua is becoming a fool, and decides to give him a new teacher.

===== Sophists and sorbonics =====
Noticing his son's apathy, Grandgousier complains to Don Philippe des Marays Viceroy de Papeligosse, who recommends a new humanist tutor named Ponocrates. As proof of his talent, he introduces him to one of his pupils, Eudémon, who declaims a eulogy of Gargantua with ease, in perfect Latin and respecting the rules of rhetoric.

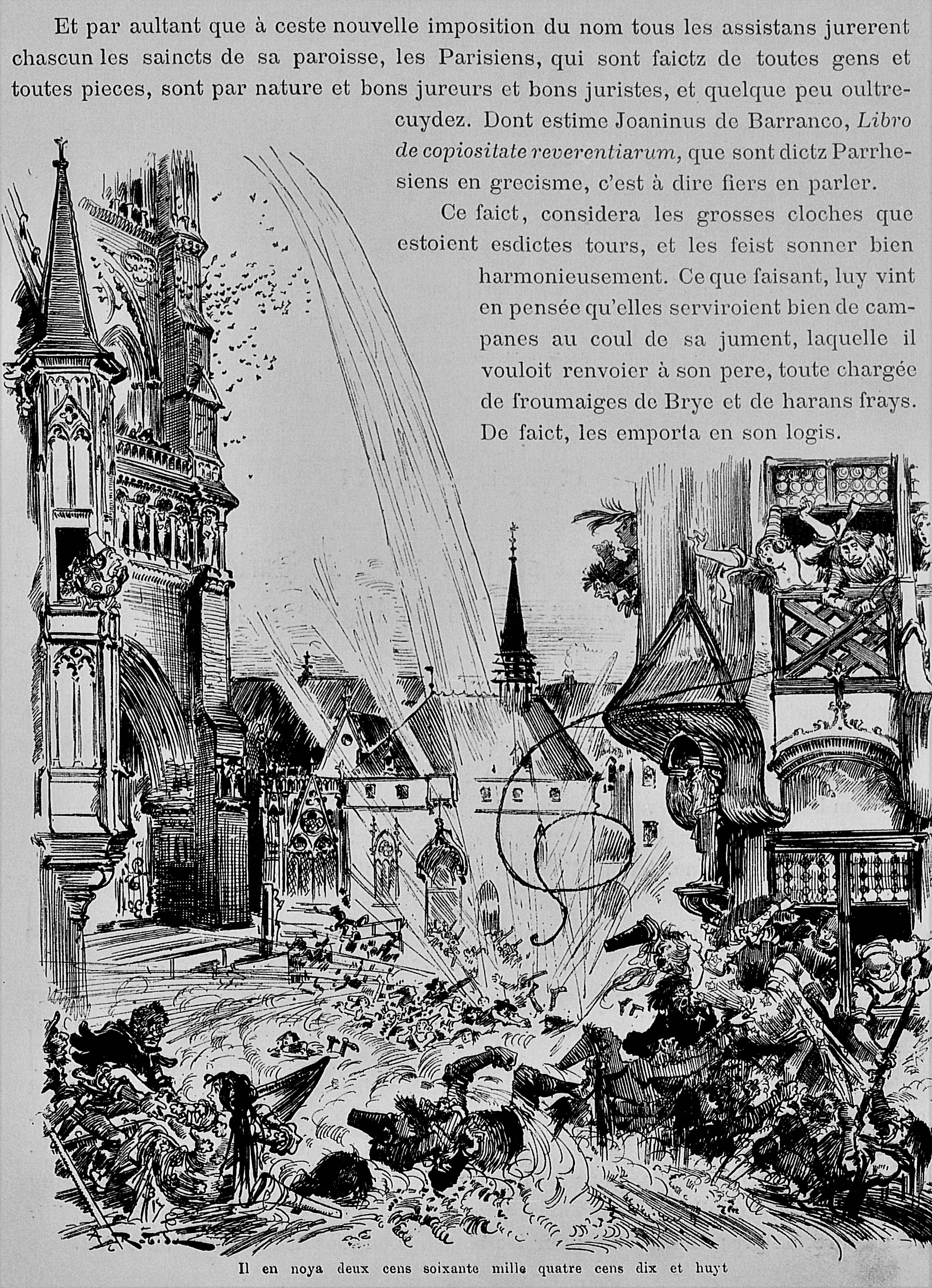
Gargantua urinates on the Parisians (Robida, 1886).

At the same time, Grandgousier receives a gift of an enormous mare from the King of Numidia (an image borrowed from medieval folklore and present in the Grandes Chroniques). Thanks to this mare, Gargantua leaves for Paris with his tutor and his people, as he wants to see how the young men of the capital study. On the way, the mare swats away “bovine flies and freslons" with such force that she razes the entire Orléans forest, a sight before which Gargantua exclaims: "Je trouve beau ce”, a fanciful and perhaps ironic etymology for the Beauce region. The toponymic account suggests disapproval of the savage leveling rather than admiration for the landscape, as evoked by the fact that the whole country was “reduict en campagne”, i.e. transformed into farmland stripped of trees.

Gargantua arrives in Paris and immediately arouses the curiosity of the city's inhabitants. He takes refuge in the towers of Notre Dame, from where he compasses his pursuers and drowns “deux cens soixante mille, quatre cent dix et huyt. Sans les femmes et petits enfans". This deluge of urine gives rise to a new etymological facetiousness, with some swearing in anger, and others “par ris” (Paris). Gargantua takes the cathedral bells and hangs them around his mare's neck. The dean of the Sorbonne, Janotus de Bragmardo (whose surname is a guaranteed equivocation on the word braquemart, which designates both a sword and the erect male sex), is sent by the university to try to convince Gargantua to return the bells. He makes a long speech, unaware that the giant has already complied with his request. The harangue is a carnivalesque caricature of the scholastic masters and theologians of the faculty, consisting mainly of coughing fits and Latin mistakes. Eudemon and Ponocrates laugh so hard they think they'll die, like Philemon. After recovering the bells, Dean Janotus asks to be rewarded; his confreres refuse, leading to an endless lawsuit whose outcome is postponed until the Greek calends.

==== Humanist teaching ====
Ponocrates observes Gargantua's behavior to understand the methods of his former tutors. The lifestyle imposed by the latter includes long periods of rest, a lack of hygiene, and a diet based on appetite, contrary to the precepts laid down by a pedagogue like Vivès. The story includes a long list of games played by the giant, such as trictrac and colin-maillard.

The preceptor decides to gently modify Gargantua's education and asks a doctor to administer ellébore d'Anticyre, reputed to cure madness, which erases his pupil's bad habits and corrupted knowledge. Gargantua receives a comprehensive, encyclopedic, and moral education, in which physical exercise and personal hygiene also play a central role. He discovers Greek and Latin authors, learns arithmetic by playing dice and cards, and practices music. The Squire Gymnast teaches him the practice of arms and cavalry; Ponocrates and Eudemon develop his taste for effort, his sense of justice, and his critical mind.

When the weather restricts outside pursuits, he pursues artistic and craft activities, such as painting and metalworking, listens to public lessons, trains in fencing, takes an interest in herbal medicine, listens to shopkeepers' gossip, and moderates his meals. This seemingly outrageous program is the measure of a giant and aims to make up for six lost decades. It is in keeping with the humanist perspective underpinned by Erasmus, in favor of a pedagogy based on the understanding and development of individual faculties. Once a month, Ponocrates and Gargantua take advantage of a sunny day to go to the country and enjoy a meal, without forgetting to recite or compose poems.

=== The Picrocholine war ===
==== Outbreak of hostilities ====
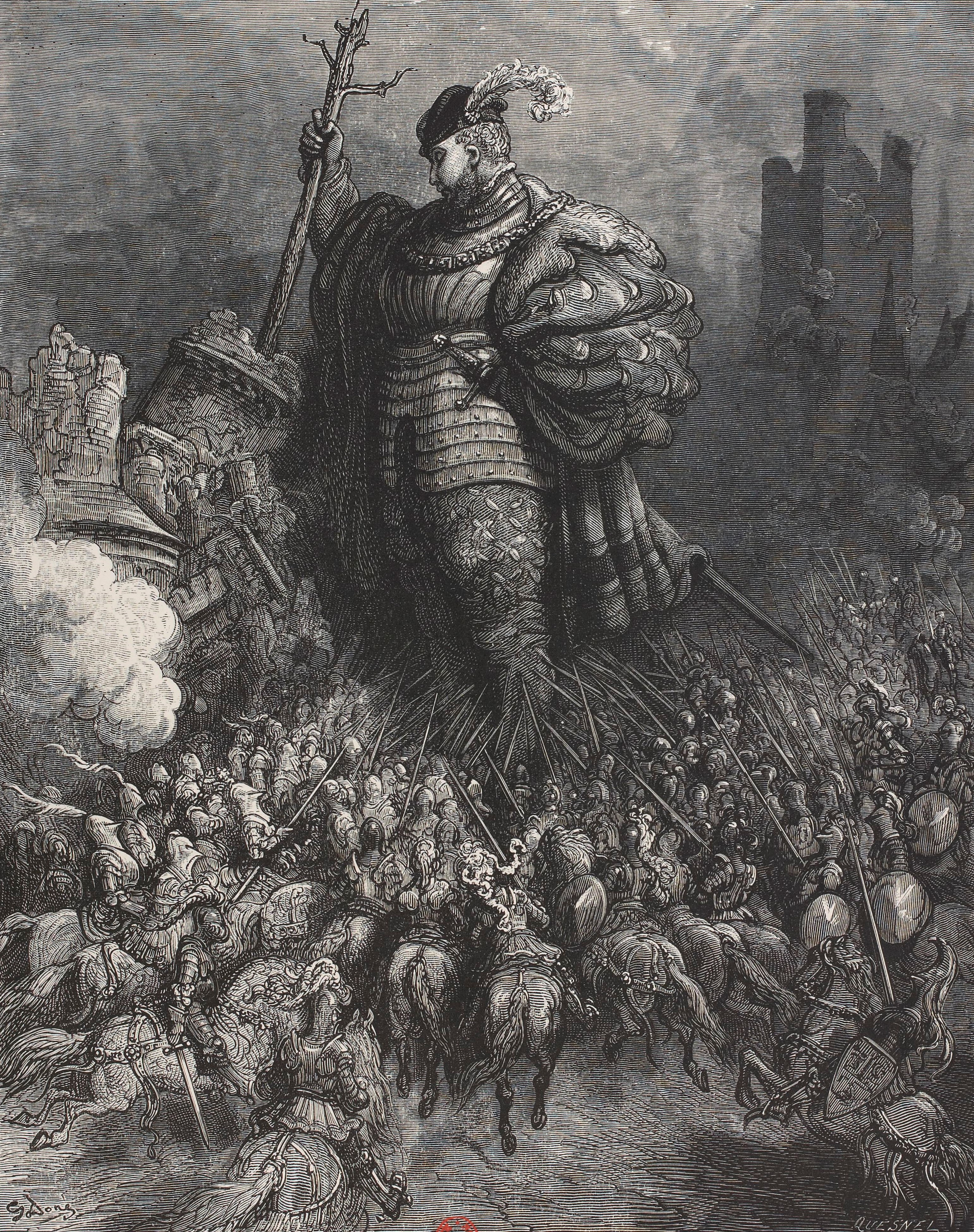
According to Abel Lefranc, the château du gué de Vède is located near Négron (Gustave Doré, 1873).

As the shepherds of Gargantua's country ask the fouaciers of Lerné to sell them their fouaces, the latter insult them. The insult turns into a fistfight. A merchant by the name of Marquet whips Frogier, one of the shepherds. Frogier knocks him unconscious. While the fouaciers leave, the shepherds take fouaces for the usual price. The incident provokes the wrath of Picrochole, king of Lerné, whose name means “who has bitter bile”. The coming war is a satire of Charles V's expansionist aims. It takes place around La Devinière, in the Chinon region of France. This rural, localized setting contrasts with the Homeric overtones of the conflict.

The army plunders and ransacks Grandgousier's lands. The attack on the Clos de l'Abbaye de Seuilly features the colorful character of Frère Jean des Entommeures, who cheerfully slaughters the looters. This episode is reminiscent of the sack of Rome, with the sacking of the vineyard evoking the threatened Church.

Picrochole seizes the castle of La Roche-Clermault, where he barricades himself solidly. In a bid to appease the invaders, Grandgousier sends his Master of Requests Ulrich Gallet to harangue them, while reminding his son in a letter of the need to defend his subjects. In an Erasmian spirit, he declares “I will not undertake war until I have tried all the ars and means of peace”, and tries to buy peace by compensating the fouaciers. Picrochole sees this as an admission of weakness; his advisors encourage his imperialist aims and invite him to conquer all the surrounding lands, as far as Asia Minor.

Arriving in Parilly after leaving Paris, Gargantua and his people decide to ask the Lord of Vauguyon about the situation. On a reconnaissance mission, Gymnaste and Squire Prelingand encounter belligerents led by Captain Tripet. Gymnaste defeats them with cunning and agility, convincing his interlocutors of his diabolical nature by performing acrobatic exercises on his horse.

Gargantua, informed of the enemies' military unpreparedness by this incident, sets off with a tree in hand. His mare urinates and causes the river to overflow, drowning the enemy troops downstream of Gué de Vède. He razes the château to the ground after receiving cannon, falcon and arquebus fire, before arriving at Grandgousier's estate. Grandgousier believes that his son is bringing “Montagu's hawks”, i.e. lice, when in fact they are artillery cannonballs, previously interpreted by Gargantua as grapes. These misinterpretations are based on exaggeration, a common comic device due to the disproportion of the giants. A feast is then prepared to celebrate this return to the family castle.

==== Table talk ====
During this sumptuous meal, Gargantua unwittingly swallows some pilgrims hidden in the lettuce in his garden. They survive by clinging to the giant's teeth, which he removes with a toothpick. Once rescued, one of the pilgrims quotes the Psalms to explain that their adventure was foretold by King David. Using the swallowing motif so dear to stories of giants, this chapter mocks the practice of pilgrimages, as well as the naive, literal reading of the biblical text.

On learning of Brother Jean's prowess, Gargantua invites him to his table. The two enjoy each other's company, drinking, rambling, and making puns in the tradition of merry table talk. Following a remark by Eudémon, Gargantua launches into a diatribe against the monks, who are accused of not working with their hands, of mumbling prayers without understanding them, and of disturbing those around them, unlike the hard-working and courageous Brother Jean. When asked why this companion has a long nose, Grandgousier asserts that it is divine will. Ponocrates, through his timely presence at the nose fair, claims, as does the man concerned, that his appendage grew in his nurse's breasts like dough with leaven. This question is in keeping with Rabelais's penchant for riddles of the time.

==== Battles and prisoners ====
After helping Gargantua fall asleep with the help of the Psalms, the monk rests, then wakes up with a start, waking all his comrades-in-arms to lead a night skirmish. The monk offers encouragement but overestimates his warrior abilities. Vituperating against the enemy, he passes under a walnut tree, clings to it, and finds himself compared to a hanged Absalom. He reproaches the others for preferring to dissert in the manner of decretalist preachers rather than come to his aid. Gymnast climbs the tree and unhooks the monk. Brother Jean abandons his warrior gear and keeps only his staff, his misadventure explained by the fact that he had agreed to don armor foreign to his nature.

Alerted to Tripet's route, and believing that Gargantua is accompanied by demons, Picrochole sends a vanguard sprinkled with holy water. The two groups meet. The Picrocholine troops, terrorized by Frère Jean's cries of “Choqcquons, diables, chocquons” flee except for their leader, Tyravant, who charges headlong. Frère Jean knocks him unconscious, then single-handedly pursues the routed army, a course of action of which Gargantua disapproves, as military discipline demands that an enemy driven to despair should not be cornered.

Finally, Brother Jean is taken prisoner, and the vanguard counterattacks. Gargantua regains the upper hand in the battle. Meanwhile, the monk kills his two guards and rushes to the rear of the confused enemy army. A new carnage, rich in precise anatomical descriptions, is unleashed, echoing that of the abbey. He imprisons Toucquedillon, Picrochole's aide-de-camp. Gargantua is very unhappy for his friend, whom he thinks is still a prisoner. Suddenly, the latter appears with Toucquedillon and five pilgrims whom Picrochole was holding hostage. They are feasting. Gargantua questions the pilgrims, railing against the preachers behind these journeys where the gullible abandon their own at the risk of their lives, encouraging the travelers to abandon the cult of the saints and offering them horses to return home. This criticism is in line with an idea common to humanists and Lutherans, developed in 1526 in Erasmus' colloquium Peregrinatio religionis ergo.

==== Assault on Roche-Clermault and defeat of Picrochole ====
Toucquedillon is presented to Grandgousier. The king tells him that “the time is not ripe to conquer the kingdoms with the dommaige of his next Christian brother” and, after an anti-belligerent speech, releases him and invites him to reason with his leader.

Grandgousier's friendly countries offer him help, but he refuses, as his forces are sufficient. He mobilizes his legions. Toucquedillon offers Picrochole reconciliation with Grandgousier. Hastiveau declares Toucquedillon a traitor, but the latter kills him. And, in turn, Toucquedillon is torn to pieces on Picrochole's orders. Gargantua and his men lay siege to the castle. The defenders hesitate as to what to do. Gargantua goes on the attack and Brother Jean kills some of Picrochole's soldiers. The two armies thus clash in a caricature of a disciplined and powerful army, and a disorganized and isolated one.

Seeing his defeat as inevitable, Picrochole decides to flee: on the road, his horse stumbles; in anger, Picrochole kills it. Picrochole then tries to steal a donkey from a miller. Since then, no one knows what has become of him. As for Gargantua, he takes a benevolent census of the survivors, frees the captive soldiers, pays them three months' wages so that they can return home, and compensates the peasants who have fallen victim to the war. His harangue addressed to the vanquished, in which he affirms the primordial nature of clemency and equanimity on the part of the victor, is inspired, in its rhetorical form, by Mélanchthon and again targets Charles V's aggressive military policy, particularly towards Francis I.

Finally, Gargantua organizes a grandiose feast, where he offers his lords lands and privileges: to Gymnaste, le Couldray, to Eudemon, Montpensier, to Tolmere, le Rivau, to Ithybole, Montsoreau, and Acamas, Candes, among others.

=== The Abbey of Thélème ===
As a reward for his bravery, Gargantua offers several abbeys to Brother Jean, who initially refuses: “Car comment (disoit il) pourroy je gouverner aultruy, qui moymesmes gouverner ne sçaurois?” He agrees to found an abbey in the country of Thélème, whose architecture is partly inspired by the castles of Chambord and Madrid. The monks' lives are organized around an egalitarian ideal and the primacy of personal will, as illustrated by their unique rule: “Fay ce que tu vouldras”. Men and women live together, there are no fortifications surrounding the building, and there is no such thing as poverty. This place has been interpreted as an anti-abbey, a monastic satire, a utopia, an earthly paradise, a model of refinement, and a marriage preparation school. Echoing the allegorical reading evoked at the start of the novel, a reworked poem by Mellin de Saint-Gelais concludes the novel, the “Enigma in Prophecy”. In it, Gargantua reads the unfolding of divine will, while Frère Jean interprets it as a description of the game of paume.

== Composition ==
The novel is often seen as a more elaborate and profound rewrite of its predecessor, Pantagruel, even though as early as the 1970s, critics such as Alfred Glauser and Barbara Bowen emphasized the effects of discontinuity in the narrative. These divergences reveal the text's tensions: Rabelais proceeds like a “comic architect”, setting up three ostensible devices that are deconstructed from within. First, the narrative is constructed in a linear fashion, from the giant's genealogy to the founding of the abbey. Correspondences between sequences ensure the coherence of the whole, for example between Gargantua's warrior education and his feats of arms. The linearity of the narrative, inspired by romances of chivalry, biographies of illustrious men, and chronicles, is nevertheless undermined by unexpected digressive episodes, such as the invention of the torchecul. Secondly, a framing device encloses the two ends of the narrative, with two staged interpretations framing two enigmas. There are, however, asymmetries, for example at the level of enunciation: Alcofrybas opens the hermeneutical question in the prologue, but does not intervene on the meaning of the prophecy. Thirdly, a play of oppositions runs through the whole, such as the good and bad ways of life, or the tyrant Picrochole and the irenic Grandgousier. Antithetical scenes become similarly complex: Brother Jean, a positive figure, happily banks with his new companions; Gargantua does not adopt his father's resolute pacifism. The troubled arrangement of the narrative framework affirms the power of the characters' words and of the narrator's, who frees himself from the logical course of the narrative, ironically disregarding narrative models and nourishing the sense of reading without freezing it.

The framing of the narrative forms a “symmetrical chiasmus composition”: the opening begins with a prologue that poses the problem of interpretation, followed by an enigma; the closing begins with an enigma that is then interpreted. The staging of the hermeneutical work is a reminder of both its necessary and problematic nature: the narrator invites a higher interpretation, while mocking the enterprise in the prologue; two readings are given of the final prophecy, without one supplanting the other. Alcofribas Nasier's injunctive tone contrasts with the call for creativity that ends the novel without concluding with a definitive truth. The anti-dot frills and the prophecy offer a mock illustration of this theory. They constitute a mise en abyme and a comic redoubling of the discourse on the ambivalence of writing. Nevertheless, in contrast to the fanfluff, the second riddle does make an effort to decipher. The complexity of this structure outlines an open-ended work that challenges the reader's intelligence.

== Thematic analysis ==
=== The comic mask ===
While the question of the ambivalence or univocality of meaning arises throughout the Pantagruelic gesture, it has particularly divided critics with regard to Gargantua, which is sometimes seen as an orderly exposition of the theses present in Pantagruel. Proponents of a historical reading, such as Abel Lefranc or Michael Screech insisted on the transparency of a work placed at the service of a humanist ideal; commentators resistant to positivist positions insisted on its playful dimension and ambiguities; Leo Spitzer put forward its unrealism. As Gérard Defaux shows, seriousness and comedy are constantly intertwined, even in the most apparently ideological or, on the contrary, unbridled passages. To reduce the work to a humanist pensum and its comic dimension to a palliative is to overlook the gratuitous aspect of Rabelaisian laughter. The multiplicity of interpretations is solicited by the text itself, as illustrated by the prologue or the enigma in prophecy. For example, Frère Jean's joyous massacres offer a wildly burlesque counterpoint to Grandgousier's pacifist declarations. The fact remains, however, that there are clear positions and orientations in the discourse: for example, the satire of the sophists or the pilgrimage is not problematized by a contrary perspective.

The relative opacity of the Rabelaisian text is partly explained by its “comic mask”, worn in Gargantua by the narrator Alcofrybas Nasier. As much a fabulator as Panurge in the other novels of the Pantagruelian gesture, he adopts the posture of a sophist, where eloquence prevails over the desire for truth. He makes mystifying statements and deploys deceptive erudition, as shown by the spurious quotations from St. Paul and Solomon used to justify the strange 11-month nativity. He takes part in casting doubt on the story, and confusing his account with the ideas of Rabelais necessarily leads to misunderstandings. He adopts archaic turns of phrase and displays his sterile erudition with a pedantry that is precisely a target of the humanists.

Alcofrybas repeatedly calls out to the reader and demands his adherence to the text, creating an effect of theatrical connivance. Breaking with fictional immersion, he doesn't content himself with alleging the veracity of the story when it's implausible – a hackneyed rhetorical device already present in Pantagruel – but questions the recipient's critical spirit by refusing to spare it. This procedure problematizes, if not nullifies, the suspension of incredulity. The sentence: “Si ne le croyez, le fondement vous escappe” (If you don't believe it, the foundation will fail you) illustrates this roundabout use of captatio benevolentiae: it can both imply a lack of reasoning (figurative meaning of “foundation”) on the part of the reader, and be a curse on him (referring to the scatological meaning of the word). Through this alternately flippant, imperious or boastful narrator, Rabelais highlights the question of belief and individual responsibility.

The prologue invites an allegorical reading, as evidenced by Alcibiades' metaphor of the silenes, already found in Plato's Symposium and later taken up by Renaissance humanists such as Erasmus in his Adages and Pico della Mirandola. And yet, he mocks the exaggeration of the glossators and brings people back to the unsurpassable horizon of the letter by playing with the allegories he deploys. Rabelais distorts Socrates' nose, which Galen described as camus rather than pointed, disguising a character known for his ugliness in contrast to the beauty of his eloquence, and uses it to symbolize a book, even though the philosopher condemns writing in the Phaedrus. Another seemingly commonplace image is that of the bone that the dog breaks to suck out its contents, which at first glance seems to oppose its depth to its superficial bark. However, in galenic medicine, the “sustantificque marrow” nourishes the bone. From this perspective, the osteological allegory means that the spirit is the best nourishment for the letter, of which it is an outcome. Erasmus, in the third book of the Ecclesiastes, asserts that the Holy Spirit has probably foreseen all the meanings that the exegete discovers by the dogmas of the faith. Similarly, if Rabelais suggests interpreting in a higher sense, he seems to use irony as a reminder that this interpretation is only ever one of several conceivable possibilities.

The proliferation of proper nouns is another obstacle to the text's transparency. Their profusion produces an impression of overflow rather than reality. References to people and places are sometimes known only to a small circle of insiders, such as the inhabitants of the Chinon region or scholars close to the writer. What's more, these allusions are sometimes masked in enigmatic form. This contrasts with the allegorical function of certain characters, allegory being based on the transparency of the idea embodied by the protagonist. For example, the fact that Toucquedillon means “braggart” in Languedoc is obvious only to a limited number of readers. This opacity, present even in Rabelais's time, is combined with deliberately cryptic passages, such as the episode of the anti-doted fanfreluches and the remarks of the drunken goods. It shows that the Rabelaisian novel is not simply the telling of a story, but also a play on the sign, not hesitating to suspend the referential illusion.

=== Educational reform ===
The novel exacerbates the charge against scholastic pedagogical methods inherited from the medieval period, as illustrated by Ponocrates' comments on the Collège de Montaigu or the confused discourse of Janotus de Bragmardo. Symmetrically, Rabelais describes an educational system nourished by humanist ideas, which opposes this old model.

The detrimental effect of the Sophist preceptors on Gargantua's personality is evident not only in his laziness and ignorance, but also in the repetitive nature of the narrative, the accumulation of indiscriminate activities (games, meals, and masses), and the scant attention paid to study. The content of his instruction serves only to justify his insatiable appetite and idle habits. In contrast, Ponocrates' education emphasized cerebral rather than bodily activities. A regulated timetable replaces indolent behavior, games and food become moments of learning, sports training replaces simple relaxation, and pleasure in work is preferred to the satisfaction of instincts.

The sophists inculcate in Gargantua a language made up of erroneous syllogisms, approximate logic, abusive recourse to arguments of authority, and tedious repetition - in other words, inauthentic speech. Humanist pedagogy, on the other hand, is based on explanatory speech, confronted with experience, a source of debate and questioning, capable of nurturing free curiosity.

Chapter XI, devoted to young Gargantua's pastimes, imaginatively depicts the child's savagery through 59 literal expressions, divided into four categories: the dirty (“écorchait le renard”, i.e. to vomit), everyday life (“songer creux”), the body (“pisser contre le soleil”) and animality (“ferrer les cigales”). This depiction of a childish condition focused primarily on curiosity about the outside world and the satisfaction of physical needs contrasts with the seriousness of pedagogical treatises, including those by the humanists Vivès and Erasmus. Rabelais' depiction of childhood is singular in that it is not limited to the educational concerns of the time, and offers an amused image of the first ages of life.

Because of his natural disposition and his consumption of “purée septembrable” (grape must), young Gargantua's complexion is said to be “phlegmatic”, which according to the theory of humors in vogue during the Renaissance means that phlegm dominates his blood mass. This temperament is reputed to be the most resistant to intellectual activity, due to the heavy substance that clogs the brain. Sophist preceptors were well aware of the dietary recommendations of the Salerno school, but struggled to apply them, with their young pupils content to wallow in bed rather than engage in real physical exercise. The body hygiene instituted by Ponocrates, such as morning rubdowns and lighter breakfasts, are just as much a part of this new pedagogical regime as the school subjects. The giant's ingenuity is all the more remarkable given his indolent nature.

=== The body, between the emblem and the carnival ===
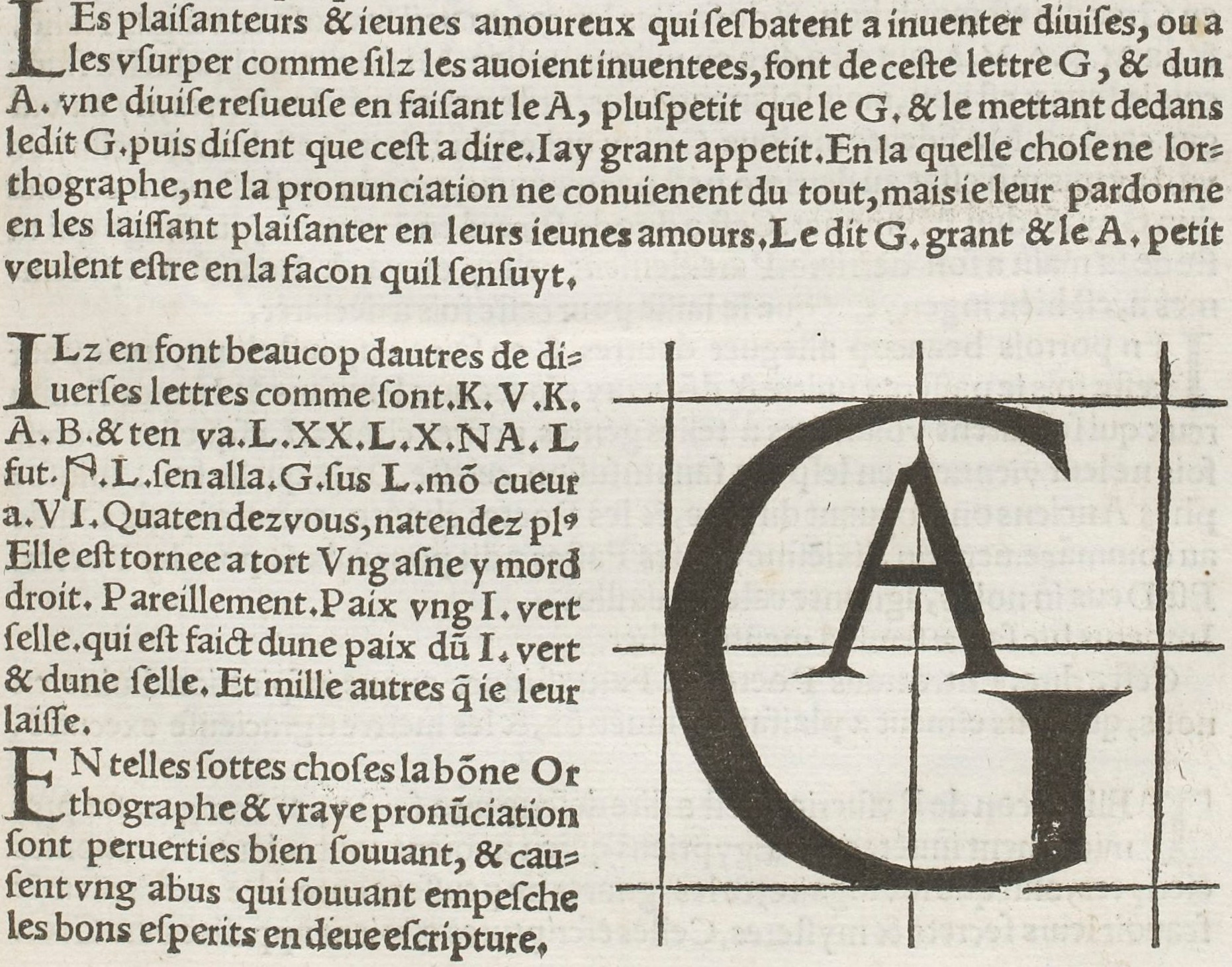
Geoffroy Tory's typographical pun about the large G including a small A, translating as “I have a big appetite”, may have influenced the choice of the name Gargantua.

The image of the body, as reflected in the novel's visual games and figurative devices, draws on medieval conceptions reworked according to Renaissance perspectives. According to Martine Sauret, the novel's fragmented visions of the body combine comic and symbolic dimensions in a single movement. The science of emblems inspires Rabelais in the composition of text and the connotation of meaning: he uses emblematic writing in an allegorical mode, weaving thematic relationships between symbols, and in a hieroglyphic mode, associating ideas with images. The medallion adorning Gargantua's hat, depicting a hermaphroditic body with two heads, four legs, and four arms, is exemplary of the latter mode: it functions not only as a motto characterizing the prince but also expresses the ideal of spiritual unity underlying the text.

According to Bakhtin, the representation of the body is put at the service of a carnivalesque aesthetic drawing on medieval popular culture. From this perspective, grotesque aesthetics are not limited to the satire of particular elements: the enormity and diversity of excessive images contribute to a comic register that goes beyond mere polemical aims. The episode of the pilgrims being eaten out of salad is part of a traditional mockery of the superstition of the faithful and the social uselessness of pilgrimages, but the swallowing and compressing motifs, which offer a demeaning vision of certain psalms, are part of an excess that is above all joyously trivial. The lower body reinforces this grotesque realism by dethroning realities considered noble and sacred. In his search for the best torchecul, young Gargantua re-evaluates his material environment from a scatological angle and completes this dethronement by associating the bliss of Elysian heroes with the pleasure of wiping himself with a gosling.

=== Moderation of war and strategic thinking ===
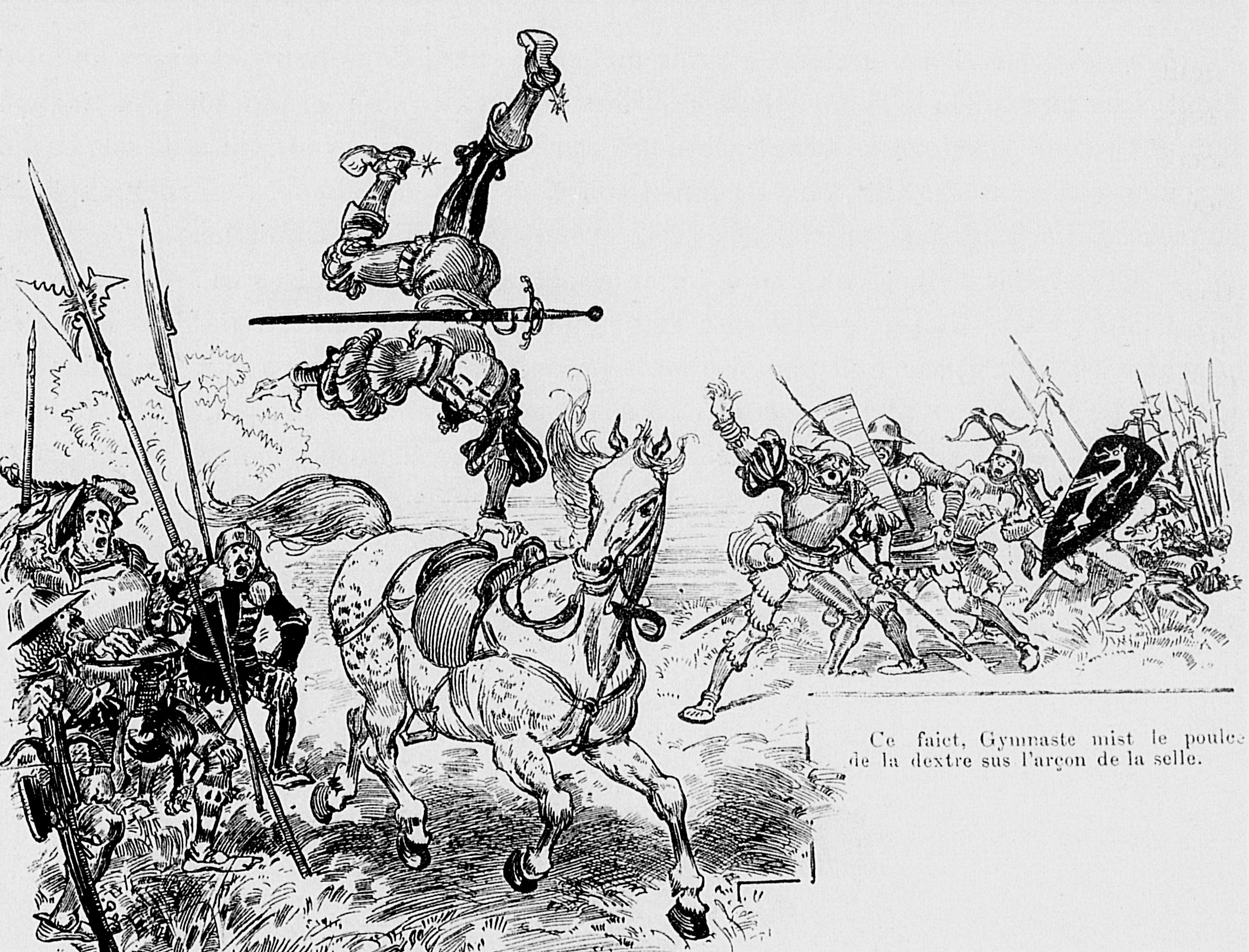
Gymnast routs his enemies with cunning (Robida, 1886).

Rabelais was influenced by Erasmus' pacifism but did not join him in his radical rejection of arms, the latter declaring an unjust peace preferable to the most just of wars in his treatise Querela pacis (The Complaint of Peace). The attitude of Grandgousier, who tries to appease Picrochole by seeking a compromise, bears witness to an attachment to peace that the prince is duty-bound to preserve. The giant's attitude echoes that of Claude de Seyssel in Monarchie de France, when he convenes his council to decide on the conduct of operations, resolving conflict only as a last resort. Although they didn't invent it, humanists advocate the peaceful resolution of disputes, notably through an investigation capable of uncovering the causes of the dispute, unlike Picrochole's advisors, who arouse their sovereign's anger with their lies and slander, and seek conciliation by redeeming fouaces. In contrast to Machiavelli's Prince, the desire to conquer is condemned, not only because of the evils it engenders, but also because the monarch's primary mission is to ensure the happiness of his subjects. Nevertheless, annexation in retaliation for aggression is not considered illicit, demonstrating Erasmus' different bias. Legitimacy over new territories is built with the consent of the conquered peoples, which presupposes fair and efficient administration. Machiavelli, on the other hand, asserts that ruin is the best way to subjugate them. Rabelais' humanism is reflected in the economy of means in the conduct of war, a Platonic idea that inspired Erasmus and Budé in their respective Institutions du Prince: in contrast to pillaging and cruelty, restraint in the use of weapons and clemency for enemies are valued.

The Picrocholine war bears traces of the humanists' military doctrine, nourished by the thinking of the Ancients despite the then-recent invention of artillery. Rabelais drew inspiration from Frontinus' Stratagemata and Vegetius' De re militari, published in Paris in 1532. They were not forgotten in the Middle Ages, but special care was taken during the Renaissance to clarify technical terms and historical context. The discipline, self-sufficiency and orderliness of Gargantua's legions as they confront Picrochole's incoherent and rapacious caterves are modeled on the formation of Roman troops. Cunning and stratagems, whether improvised or not, are part of this strategic thinking, and distinguish the gargantuan army from the blind brutality of the enemies: Gymnaste exploits the superstition of his opponents, and the Great Mare routs the attackers at the Ford of Vède by causing a flood. This last point echoes Frontinus' account of Quintus Metellus diverting a river to drown a camp during a war in Hispania Citerior. The emphasis on military discipline can be seen in Gymnast's skills as a squire and the training of his mount, which is accustomed to danger and corpses. Rabelais's tactical considerations sketch out a model drawn from ancient military art, but which is also relevant today, as shown by the ordinance issued by François I on July 24, 1534, decreeing the dismissal of Swiss mercenaries and the creation of infantry legions.

=== The Good prince's values and pragmatism ===
Grandgousier's and Gargantua's political choices could run counter to the positions developed by Machiavelli, but there is no established proof. Although manuscript copies of the Prince and Discourses were circulating as early as the 1510s, these works were not printed until the 1530s, although it is possible that Rabelais became aware of them during one of his trips to Italy. In any case, in the novel, the heroes of Antiquity are not always held up as examples, especially when they contravene evangelical values, with Alexander and Caesar cited as examples of conquerors to be followed by Toucquedillon. Machiavelli, on the other hand, believes that the pursuit of glory and military art takes precedence over moral values, which at best bring secondary renown. What's more, he advocates brutal audacity and inflexibility to make oneself master of destiny, while Gymnastus shows the importance of humility and prudence in the face of the vagaries of fortune.

The opposition between a good prince and an evil tyrant, while not false, needs to be nuanced. Gargantua is more inclined to violence than his father Grandgousier, who appears more enthusiastic in the comfort of his castle than on a battlefield. Grandgousier represents the constitutional, feudal prince of the Middle Ages, while Gargantua thinks in terms of power like a modern king. While he does not punish soldiers without rank, he does entrust Ponocratès with the regency of the kingdom of Picrochole, who has fled. Anxious to avoid excessive weakness, he calls for the handover of evil advisors and captains.

Gargantua's political thinking is not free from calculation, or even cynicism. Grandgousier's praise of clemency conceals a surreptitious seizure of power by Gargantua. Gargantua, who took up arms in the name of his father, who was still officially on the throne at the end of the hostilities, distributes fiefs that he does not own. To justify his policy of giving, Gargantua speaks of the indulgence of his ancestors, which can be understood in a discreetly ironic way. Indeed, he takes as an example Charles VIII's victory over the Bretons at Saint-Aubin-du-Cormier and the destruction of Parthenay, where the king was not particularly magnanimous, according to witnesses. Above all, he explains how Alpharbal, king of the Canary Islands, was inordinately grateful to Grandgousier, who treated him humanely and lavishly when he tried to invade his kingdom. This is a historical inversion, as it was Jean de Béthencourt's flotilla that seized part of the archipelago before it was ceded to the Spanish crown. So, even if benevolence is part of the humanist perspective, Gargantua's speech suggests a persiflage towards this same type of panegyric, which is a Machiavellian justification of the victor. In passing, he scratches at the “kings and emperors (...) who call themselves Catholic” and do not behave as such, probably alluding to Charles V or the Catholic kings who accepted as gifts the enslaved kings of Tenerife.

== Origin of the giant ==
=== Celtic folklore and mythology ===
Before the 19th century, literary scholars had long believed that Gargantua was an invention of Rabelais, until the publication of studies in the 19th century gradually affirmed the popular origin of the giant. In the 1810s, Thomas de Saint-Mars launched this field of research by showing traces of the giant in local traditions and place names, such as Mont Gargan north of Nantes. In 1863, Henri Gaidoz linked Gargantua to Gargan, a hypothetical Celtic sun god. Then, in 1883, Paul Sébillot compiled these clues in Gargantua et les traditions populaires. From the 1940s onwards, Henri Dontenville continued Gaidoz's work, locating traces of Gargantua and placing them in a medieval mythological context.

=== Gargantuan chronicles ===
Between 1535 and 1540, a series of chronicles featuring the character of Gargantua appeared. In Pantagruel, Rabelais's first novel, the narrator mentions the Grandes et inestimables chroniques du grant et enorme geant Gargantua, saying of them: “il en a été plus vendu par les imprimeurs en deux moys qu'il ne sera acheté de Bibles en neuf ans”. Rabelais, who undoubtedly took part in the 1532 edition of these Chroniques, followed in his footsteps, taking up the figure of the giant and using it to parody the novel of chivalry and the historical narrative.

== Posterity, revivals and inspirations ==
=== Amusement park ===
Gargantua was represented in a huge statue located in the former Mirapolis theme park near Paris. The hollow statue was the largest in Europe and the second largest in the world, behind the Statue of Liberty. The attraction was demolished in 1995 after the park went bankrupt.

== Bibliography ==
=== Editions ===
==== Gargantuan chronicles of the 16th century ====
- Les grandes et inestimables Cronicques du grant et énorme géant Gargantua (1532). Barnabé Chaussard. Reprinted by éditions des Quatre Chemins, 1925.
- Le vroy Gargantua (1533). Reprinted by Nizet, 1949.
- Les Croniques admirables du puissant roy Gargantua (1534). Reprinted by Éditions Gay, 1956.

==== Gargantua ====
===== Early editions =====
A dozen editions of Gargantua were published during the writer's lifetime.

- Rabelais, François (1534–1535). Gargantua.
- Rabelais, François (1542). La vie tres horrificque du grand Gargantua.
- Dolet, Etienne (1542). La Plaisante, et joyeuse histoyre du grand Geant Gargantua.

===== Modern editions =====
- Rabelais, François (1994). Œuvres complètes. Gallimard. ISBN 978-2-07-011340-8
- Rabelais, François (2007). Gargantua. Gallimard. ISBN 978-2-07-031736-3

=== Critical works ===
==== General works ====
- Bakhtine, Mikhaïl (1982). L'œuvre de François Rabelais et la culture populaire sous la Renaissance. Gallimard. ISBN 2-07-023404-5.
- Defaux, Gérard (1997). Rabelais agonistes : du rieur au prophète, Etudes sur Pantagruel, Gargantua, Le Quart Livre. Revue des Sciences Religieuses. ISBN 2-600-00202-2.
- Screech, Michael (1992). Rabelais. Gallimard. ISBN 978-2-07-012348-3

==== Origin and nature of the giant Gargantua ====
- Pillard, Guy-Édouard (1987). Le Vrai Gargantua : mythologie d'un géant. Image. ISBN 2-902702-38-8.
- Braunrot, Bruno (1994). “Hommes et géants: la conception du compagnonnage dans le Gargantua-Pantagruel”. In Michel Simonin (ed.), Rabelais pour le xxie siècle: actes du Colloque du Centre d'Etudes supérieures de la Renaissance. Droz.
- Stephens, Walter (1989). Les Géants de Rabelais : folklore, histoire ancienne, nationalisme. Honoré Champion. ISBN 2-7453-1399-1

==== Genre, style and narrative ====
- Rigolot, François (1996). Les Langages de Rabelais. Droz. ISBN 2-600-00506-4
- Huchon, Mireille (1986). “Rabelais et les genres d'escrire”. In Raymond C. La Charité (ed.), Rabelais's Incomparable Book: essays on his art. French Forum.
- Bouchard, Mawy (2011). “Parce que le rire est le propre... du roman? La profanation romanesque de l'écriture à la Renaissance”. Études françaises.
- de Lajarte, Philippe (2012). “De l'enfance du héros à l'utopie thélémite: ruptures du discours et logique du récit dans le Gargantua”. Seizième Siècle.

==== Humanism, education ====
- Sauret, Martine (1997). Gargantua et les délits du corps. Peter Lang.
- Bakutyte, Ingrida and Smith, Paul. (2013) “La naissance de Gargantua, le choix d'Hercule et les inondations du Nil”. Revue d'histoire littéraire de la France.
- Ternaux, Jean-Claude. (2019). “Tyranny and freedom in Gargantua”. Hipogrifo. Revista de literatura y cultura del Siglo de Oro.
- Seutin, Christine. (1998). “Démesure, folie et sagesse dans le Gargantua de Rabelais”. In Denise Alexandre (ed.) Héroïsme et démesure dans la littérature de la Renaissance: les avatars de l'épopée, Saint-Etienne. Publications de l'université de Saint-Etienne.
- Zegna-Rata, Olivier (1995). "L'acheminement vers la parole ou l'éducation de Gargantua". Études rabelaisiennes. Droz. ISBN 2-600-00061-5.

== See also ==
- Gargantua and Pantagruel
- A True Story

== Bibliography ==
- Juste, François (2007). Gargantua. Gallimard.
