= Gargantua and Pantagruel =

1532–1564 novels by François Rabelais

The Five Books of the Lives and Deeds of Gargantua and Pantagruel
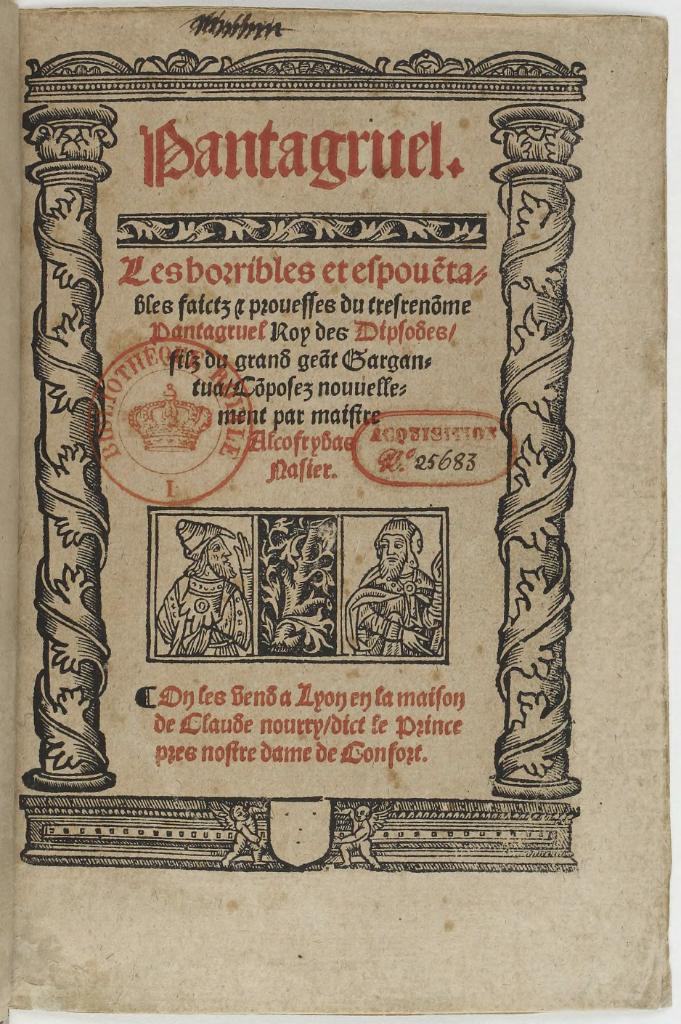
- Title-page of a c. 1532 edition of Pantagruel
- Pantagruel (c. 1532); Gargantua (1534); The Third Book of Pantagruel (1546); The Fourth Book of Pantagruel (1552); The Fifth Book of Pantagruel (c. 1564)
- Author: François Rabelais ("Alcofribas Nasier")
- Original title: Les Cinq livres des faits et dits de Gargantua et Pantagruel
- Translator: Thomas Urquhart, Peter Anthony Motteux
- Illustrator: Gustave Doré (1854 edition)
- Country: France
- Language: Classical French
- Genre: Satire
- Published: c. 1532 – c. 1564
- Published in English: 1693–1694
- No. of books: 5

The Five Books of the Lives and Deeds of Gargantua and Pantagruel (French: Les Cinq livres des faits et dits de Gargantua et Pantagruel), (Note: The series title in the original French is La Vie de Gargantua et de Pantagruel.) often shortened to Gargantua and Pantagruel or the Cinq Livres (Five Books), is a pentalogy of novels written in the 16th century by François Rabelais. (Note: The degree to which Rabelais can be said to be the sole author of the fifth book, parts of which were first published nine years after his death, remains an open question.) It tells the adventures of two giants, Gargantua (/ɡɑːrˈɡæntjuə/ gar-GAN-tew-ə; French: [ɡaʁɡɑ̃tɥa]) and his son Pantagruel (/pænˈtæɡruɛl, -əl, ˌpæntəˈɡruːəl/ pan-TAG-roo-el, -əl, PAN-tə-GROO-əl; French: [pɑ̃taɡʁyɛl]). The work is written in an amusing, extravagant, and satirical vein, features much erudition, vulgarity, and wordplay, and is regularly compared with the works of William Shakespeare and James Joyce. Rabelais was a polyglot, and the work introduced "a great number of new and difficult words ... into the French language".

The work was stigmatised as obscene by the censors of the Collège de la Sorbonne. In a social climate of increasing religious oppression in the lead up to the French Wars of Religion, contemporaries treated it with suspicion and avoided mentioning it.

The characters of Gargantua and his son Pantagruel were not created by Rabelais but inspired by various folk tales which had been collated in the early sixteenth century into five different works, collectively referred to as the Gargantuan Chronicles, the most popular of which, Les Grandes et Inestimables Cronicques du grant et enorme geant Gargantua, Rabelais references in his prologue.

It is the origin of the word Pantagruelism, meaning "buffoonery or coarse humor with a satirical or serious purpose"; and also gargantuan, meaning "enormous".

== Initial publication ==
The novels were written progressively without a preliminary plan.

Vol.	Short title	Full title	English title	Published
1	Pantagruel	Les horribles et épouvantables faits et prouesses du très renommé Pantagruel Roi des Dipsodes, fils du Grand Géant Gargantua	The Horrible and Terrifying Deeds and Words of the Very Renowned Pantagruel King of the Dipsodes, Son of the Great Giant Gargantua	c. 1532
2	Gargantua	La vie très horrifique du grand Gargantua, père de Pantagruel	The Very Horrific Life of Great Gargantua, Father of Pantagruel	1534
3	The Third Book of Pantagruel	Le tiers livre des faicts et dicts héroïques du bon Pantagruel	The Third Book of the Heroic Deeds and Sayings of Good Pantagruel	1546
4	The Fourth Book of Pantagruel	Le quart livre des faicts et dicts héroïques du bon Pantagruel	The Fourth Book of the Heroic Deeds and Sayings of Good Pantagruel	1552
5	The Fifth Book of Pantagruel	Le cinquiesme et dernier livre des faicts et dicts héroïques du bon Pantagruel	The Fifth and Last Book of the Heroic Deeds and Sayings of Good Pantagruel	c. 1564

== Synopsis ==
=== Pantagruel ===
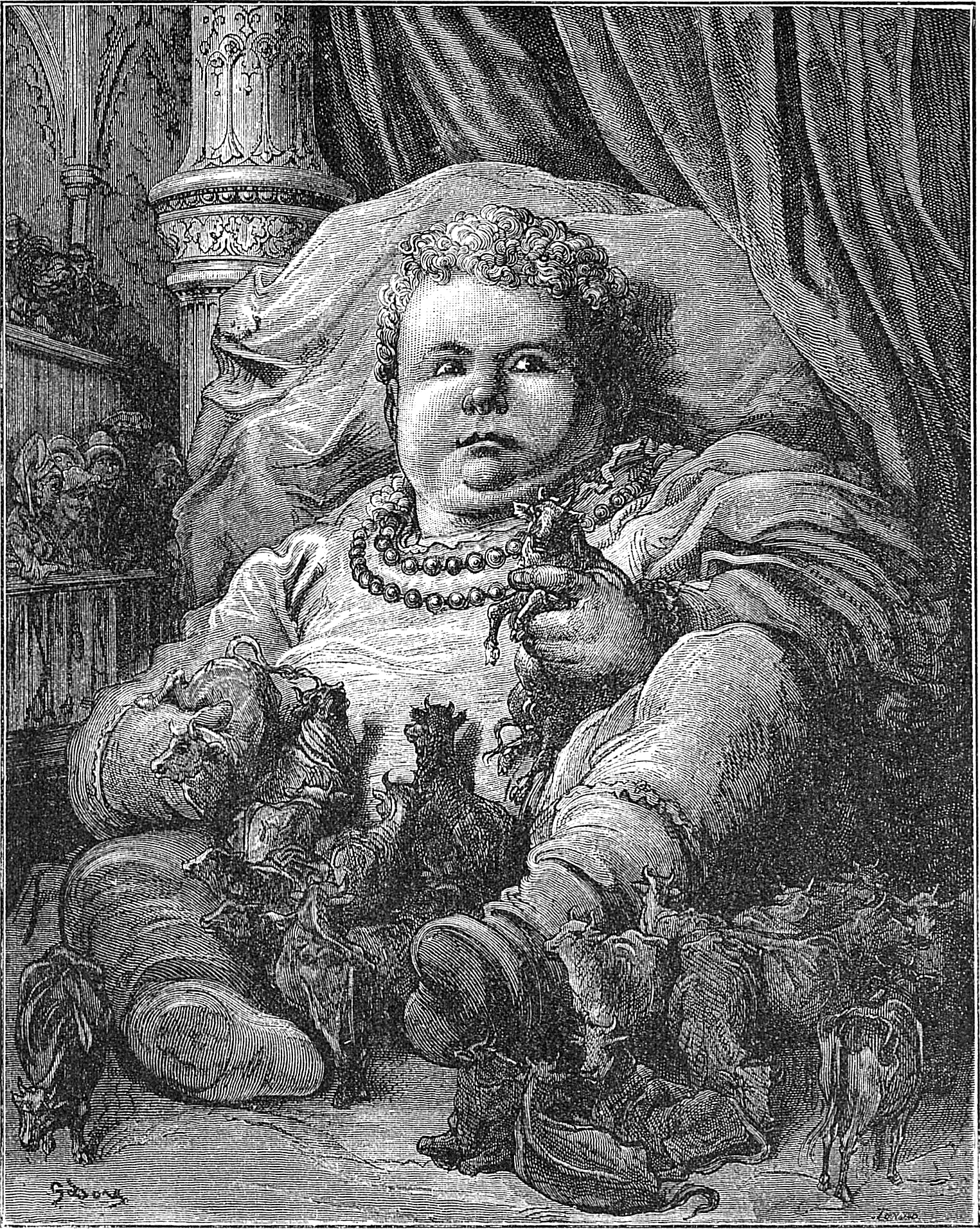
A Gustave Doré illustration of a young Pantagruel, who drinks the milk of thousands of cows

The full modern English title for the work commonly known as Pantagruel is The Horrible and Terrifying Deeds and Words of the Very Renowned Pantagruel King of the Dipsodes, Son of the Great Giant Gargantua and in French, Les horribles et épouvantables faits et prouesses du très renommé Pantagruel Roi des Dipsodes, fils du Grand Géant Gargantua. The original title of the work was Pantagruel roy des dipsodes restitué à son naturel avec ses faictz et prouesses espoventables. Although most modern editions of Rabelais' work place Pantagruel as the second volume of a series, it was actually published first, around 1532 under the pen name "Alcofribas Nasier", an anagram of François Rabelais.

The narrative begins with the origin of giants; Pantagruel's particular genealogy; and his birth. His childhood is briefly covered, before his father sends him away to the universities. He acquires a great reputation. On receiving a letter with news that his father has been translated to Fairyland by Morgan le Fay, and that the Dipsodes, hearing of it, have invaded his land and are besieging a city, Pantagruel and his companions depart.

Through subterfuge, might, and urine, the besieged city is relieved, and their residents are invited to invade the Dipsodes, who mostly surrender to Pantagruel as he and his army approach their towns. During a downpour, Pantagruel shelters his army with his tongue, and the narrator travels into Pantagruel's mouth. He returns some months later and learns that the hostilities are over.

=== Gargantua ===
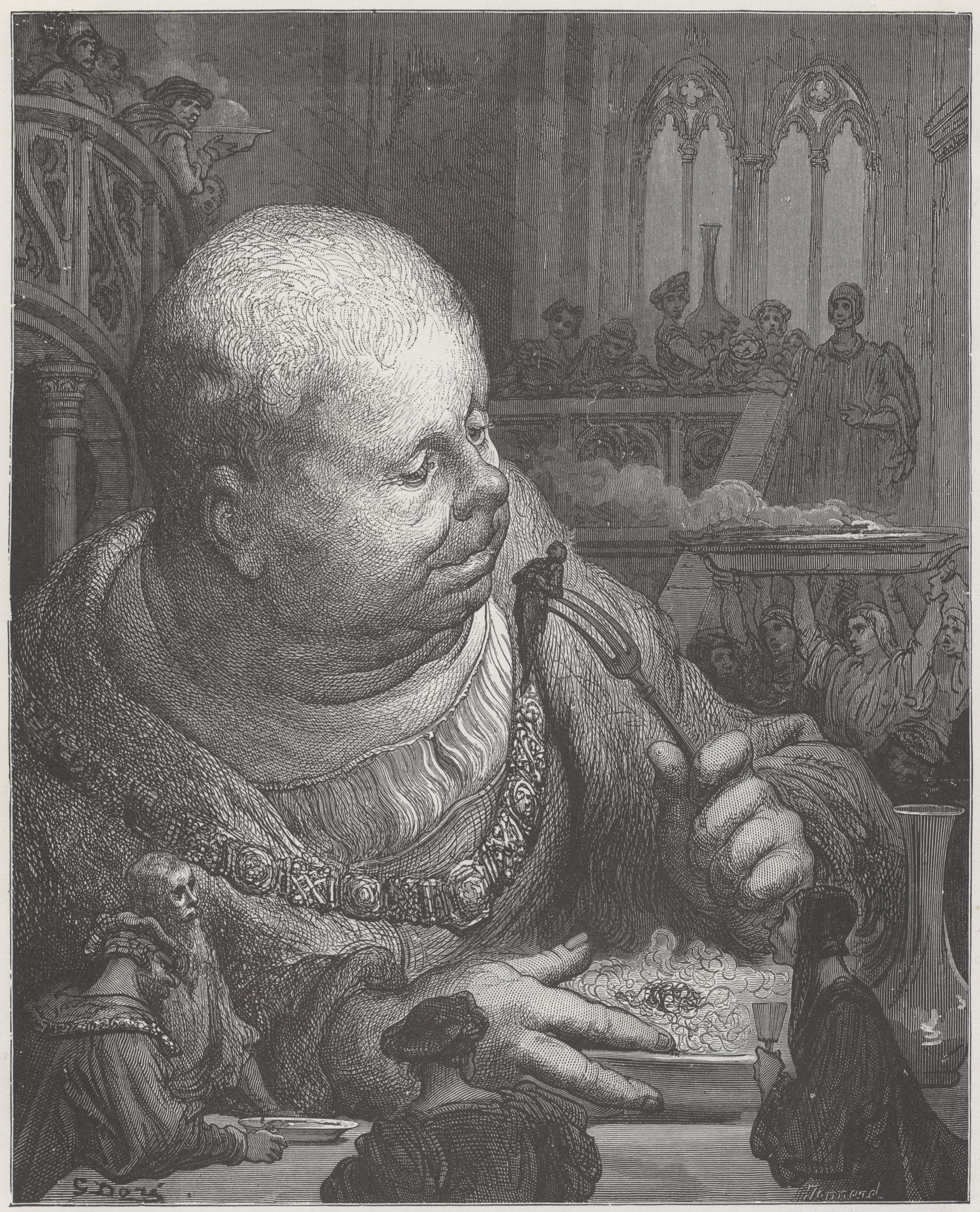
Illustration of Gargantua by Gustave Doré, Chapter XXXVIII

After the success of Pantagruel, Rabelais revisited and revised his source material, producing an improved narrative of the life and deeds of Pantagruel's father: The Very Horrific Life of Great Gargantua, Father of Pantagruel (in French, La vie très horrifique du grand Gargantua, père de Pantagruel), commonly known as Gargantua.

The narrative begins with Gargantua's birth and childhood. He impresses his father (Grandgousier) with his intelligence, and is entrusted to a tutor. This education renders him a great fool, and he is later sent to Paris with a new tutor.

After Gargantua's reeducation, the narrator turns to some bakers from a neighbouring land who are transporting some fouaces. Some shepherds politely ask these bakers to sell them some of the said fouaces, which request escalates into war.

Gargantua is summoned, while Grandgousier seeks peace. The enemy king (Picrochole) is not interested in peace, so Grandgousier reluctantly prepares for violence. Gargantua leads a well-orchestrated assault, and defeats the enemy.

=== The Third Book ===
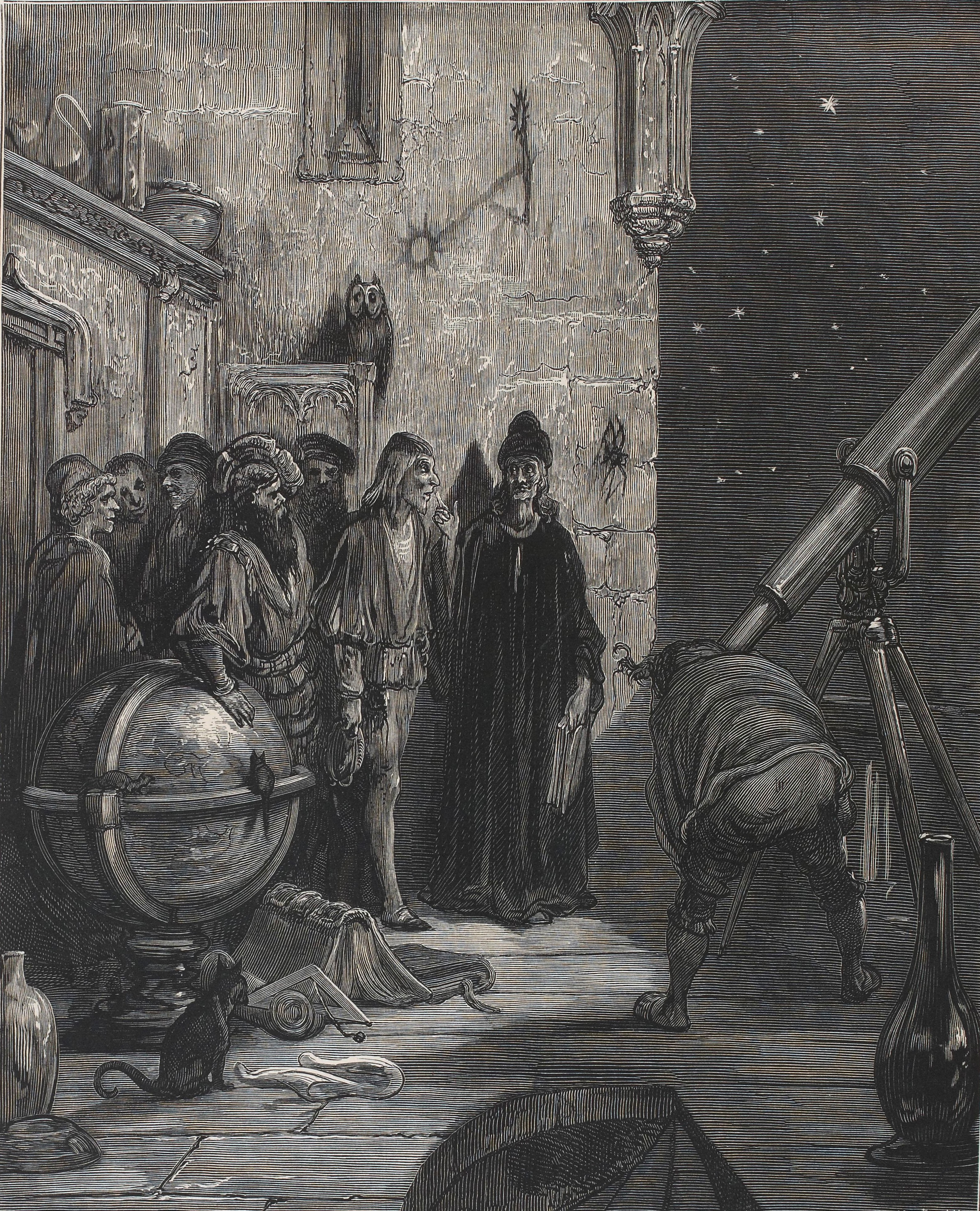
Illustration by Gustave Doré, Chapter XXV

In The Third Book of Pantagruel (in French, Le tiers-livre de Pantagruel; the original title is Le tiers livre des faicts et dicts héroïques du bon Pantagruel), Rabelais picks up where Pantagruel ended, continuing in the form of a dialogue.

Pantagruel and Panurge discuss the latter's profligacy, and Pantagruel determines to pay his debts for him. Panurge, out of debt, becomes interested in marriage, and wants advice.

A multitude of counsels and prognostications are met with, and repeatedly rejected by Panurge, until he wants to consult the Divine Bottle.

Preparations for a voyage thereto are made.

=== The Fourth Book ===
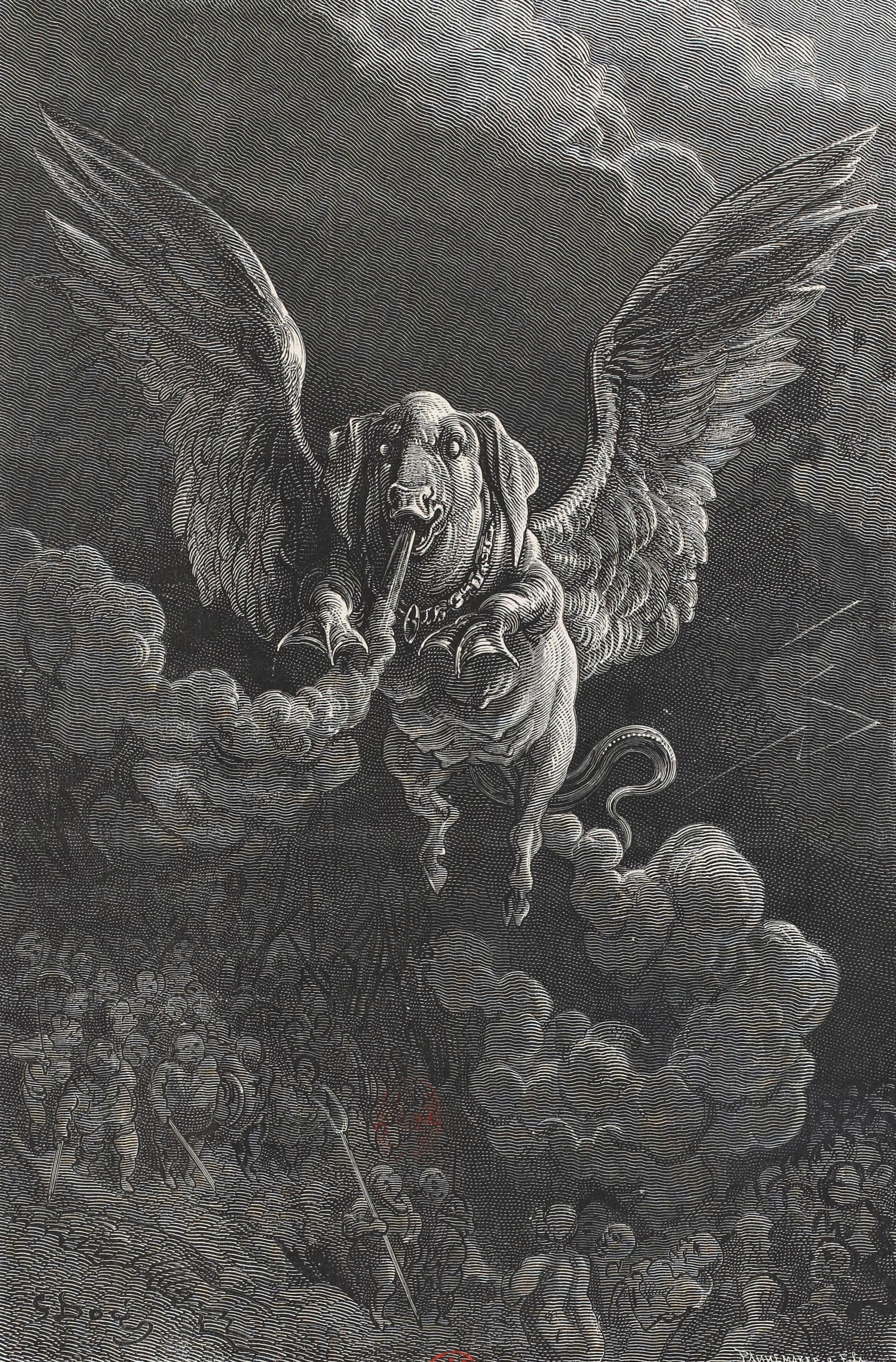
Illustration of the flying pig-monster by Gustave Doré, Chapter XLI

In The Fourth Book of Pantagruel (in French, Le quart-livre de Pantagruel; the original title is Le quart livre des faicts et dicts héroïques du bon Pantagruel), Rabelais picks up where The Third Book ended, with Pantagruel and companions putting to sea for their voyage toward the Divine Bottle, Bacbuc (which is the Hebrew word for "bottle", בקבוק)

They sail onward, passing, or landing at, places of interest, until they meet a storm, which they endure, until they can land again.

Having returned to sea, they kill a sea-monster, and drag that ashore, where they are attacked by Chitterlings. Fierce culinary combat ensues, but is peaceably resolved, having been interrupted by a flying pig-monster.

Again, they continue their voyage, passing, or landing at, places of interest, until the book ends, with the ships firing a salute, and Panurge soiling himself.

=== The Fifth Book ===
The Fifth Book of Pantagruel (in French, Le cinquième-livre de Pantagruel; the original title is Le cinquiesme et dernier livre des faicts et dicts héroïques du bon Pantagruel) was published posthumously around 1564, and chronicles the further journeyings of Pantagruel and his friends.

At Ringing Island, the company find birds living in the same hierarchy as the Catholic Church. On Tool Island, the people are so fat they slit their skin to allow the fat to puff out. At the next island they are imprisoned by Furred Law-Cats, and escape only by answering a riddle. Nearby, they find an island of lawyers who nourish themselves on protracted court cases. In the Queendom of Whims, they uncomprehendingly watch a living-figure chess match with the miracle-working and prolix Queen Quintessence.

Passing by the abbey of the sexually prolific Semiquavers, and the Elephants and monstrous Hearsay of Satin Island, they come to the realms of darkness. Led by a guide from Lanternland, they go deep below the earth to the oracle of Bacbuc. After much admiring of the architecture and many religious ceremonies, they come to the sacred bottle itself. It utters the one word "trinc". After drinking liquid text from a book of interpretation, Panurge concludes wine inspires him to right action, and he forthwith vows to marry as quickly and as often as possible.

== Analysis ==
=== Authorship of The Fifth Book ===
The authenticity of The Fifth Book has been doubted since it first appeared in 1564. (Rabelais died in 1553.) Both during and after Rabelais' life, books that he did not write were published in his name. The Fifth Book of Pantagruel that usually accompanies the other, certainly genuine, books, is not the only Fifth Book of Pantagruel known to have existed. At least one pseudo-Rabelaisian book was merely subsumed by this Fifth Book that accompanies Rabelais' certain books. It includes much "flatly borrowed [...] and dull material".

Some people believe the book was based on some of Rabelais' papers; some believe that it has "nothing to do with Rabelais". M. A. Screech is of this latter opinion, and, introducing his translation, he bemoans that "[s]ome read back into the Four books the often cryptic meanings they find in the Fifth". Donald M. Frame is of the opinion that, when Rabelais died, he "probably left some materials on where to go on from Book 4", and that somebody, "after some adding and padding", assembled the book that he does not find "either clearly or largely authentic". Frame is "taken with" Mireille Huchon's work in "Rabelais Grammairien", which he cites in support of his opinion. J. M. Cohen, in his Introduction to a Penguin Classics edition, indicates that chapters 17–48 were so out-of-character as to be seemingly written by another person, with the Fifth Book "clumsily patched together by an unskilful editor."

=== Bakhtin's analysis of Rabelais ===
Mikhail Bakhtin's book Rabelais and His World (published in 1965) explores Gargantua and Pantagruel and is considered a classic of Renaissance studies. Bakhtin declares that for centuries Rabelais' book had been misunderstood. Throughout Rabelais and His World, Bakhtin attempts two things. First, to recover sections of Gargantua and Pantagruel that in the past were either ignored or suppressed. Secondly, to conduct an analysis of the Renaissance social system in order to discover the balance between language that was permitted and language which was not.

Through this analysis, Bakhtin pinpoints two important subtexts in Rabelais' work: the first is carnivalesque which Bakhtin describes as a social institution, and the second is grotesque realism, which is defined as a literary mode. Thus, in Rabelais and His World, Bakhtin studies the interaction between the social and the literary, as well as the meaning of the body.

Bakhtin explains that carnival in Rabelais' work and age is associated with the collectivity, for those attending a carnival do not merely constitute a crowd. Rather the people are seen as a whole, organized in a way that defies socioeconomic and political organization. According to Bakhtin, "[A]ll were considered equal during carnival. Here, in the town square, a special form of free and familiar contact reigned among people who were usually divided by the barriers of caste, property, profession, and age".

At carnival time, the unique sense of time and space causes the individual to feel he is a part of the collectivity, at which point he ceases to be himself. It is at this point that, through costume and mask, an individual exchanges bodies and is renewed. At the same time there arises a heightened awareness of one's sensual, material, bodily unity and community.

Bakhtin says also that in Rabelais the notion of carnival is connected with that of the grotesque. The collectivity partaking in the carnival is aware of its unity in time as well as its historic immortality associated with its continual death and renewal. According to Bakhtin, the body is in need of a type of clock if it is to be aware of its timelessness. The grotesque is the term used by Bakhtin to describe the emphasis of bodily changes through eating, evacuation, and sex: Rabelais uses it as a measuring device.

=== Contradiction and conflicting interpretations ===
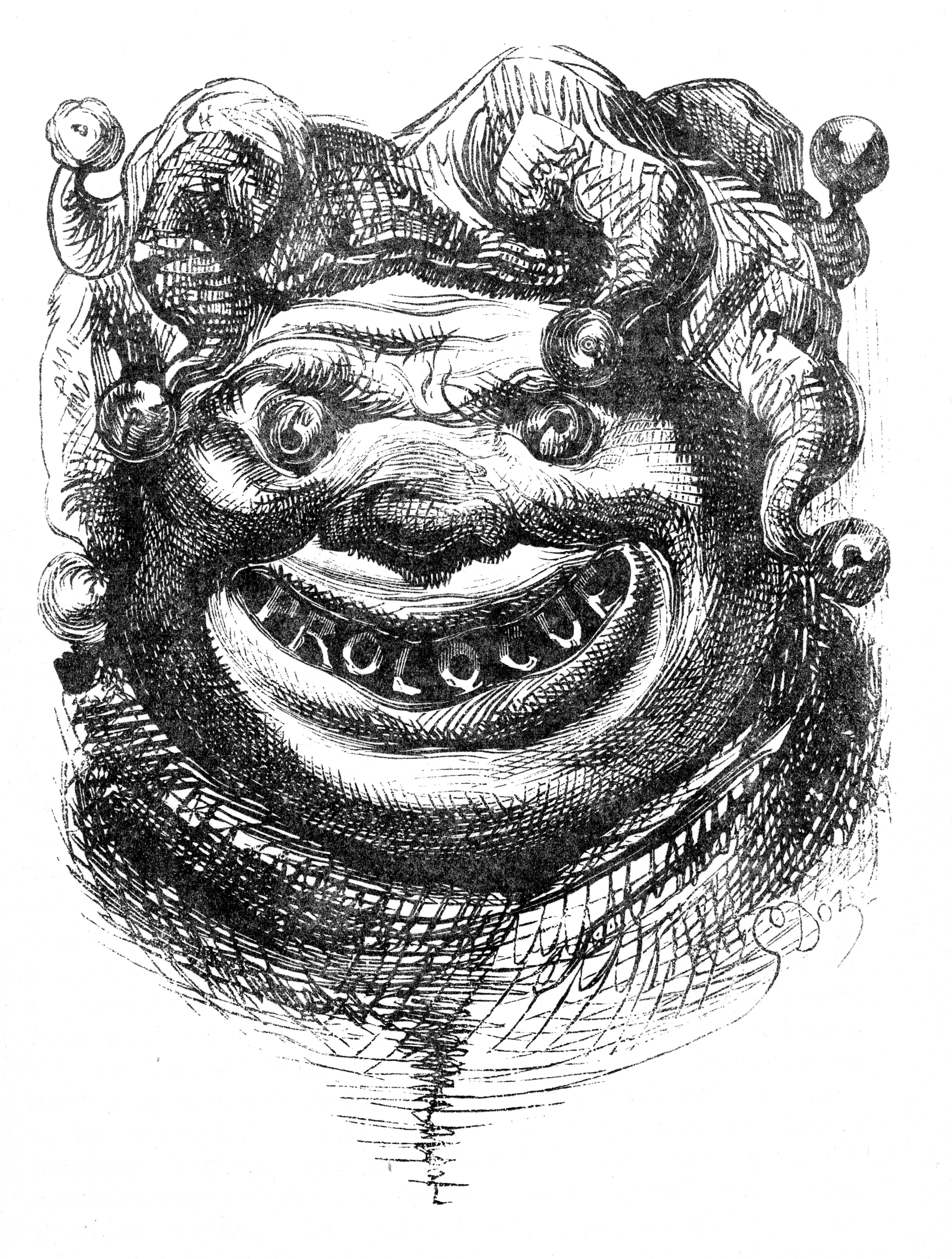
Illustration by Gustave Doré, Gargantua, Author's Prologue

The five books of Gargantua and Pantagruel often open with Gargantua, which itself opens with Socrates, in The Symposium, being likened to Sileni. Sileni, as Rabelais informs the reader, were little boxes "painted on the outside with merry frivolous pictures" but used to store items of high value. In Socrates, and particularly in The Symposium, Rabelais found a person who exemplified many paradoxes, and provided a precedent for his "own brand of serious play". In these opening pages of Gargantua, Rabelais exhorts the reader "to disregard the ludicrous surface and seek out the hidden wisdom of his book"; but immediately "mocks those who would extract allegorical meanings from the works of Homer and Ovid". As Rudnytsky says, "the problem of conflicting interpretations broached in the Prologue to Gargantua is reenacted by Rabelais in various forms throughout his work". Moreover, as he points out, this "play of double senses" has misled even the most expert of commentators.

=== Satire ===
Rabelais has "frequently been named as the world's greatest comic genius"; and Gargantua and Pantagruel covers "the entire satirical spectrum". Its "combination of diverse satirical traditions" challenges "the readers' capacity for critical independent thinking"; which latter, according to Bernd Renner, is "the main concern". It also promotes "the advancement of humanist learning, the evangelical reform of the Church, [and] the need for humanity and brotherhood in politics", among other things.

According to John Parkin, the "humorous agendas are basically four":

- the "campaigns in which Rabelais engaged, using laughter to enhance his principles";
- he "derides medieval scholarship both in its methods and its representatives";
- he "mocks ritual prayer, the traffic in indulgences, monasticism, pilgrimage, Roman rather than universal Catholicism, and its converse, dogmatic Protestantism";
- and he "lampoons the emperor Charles V, implying that his policies are tyrannical".

== Reception and influence ==
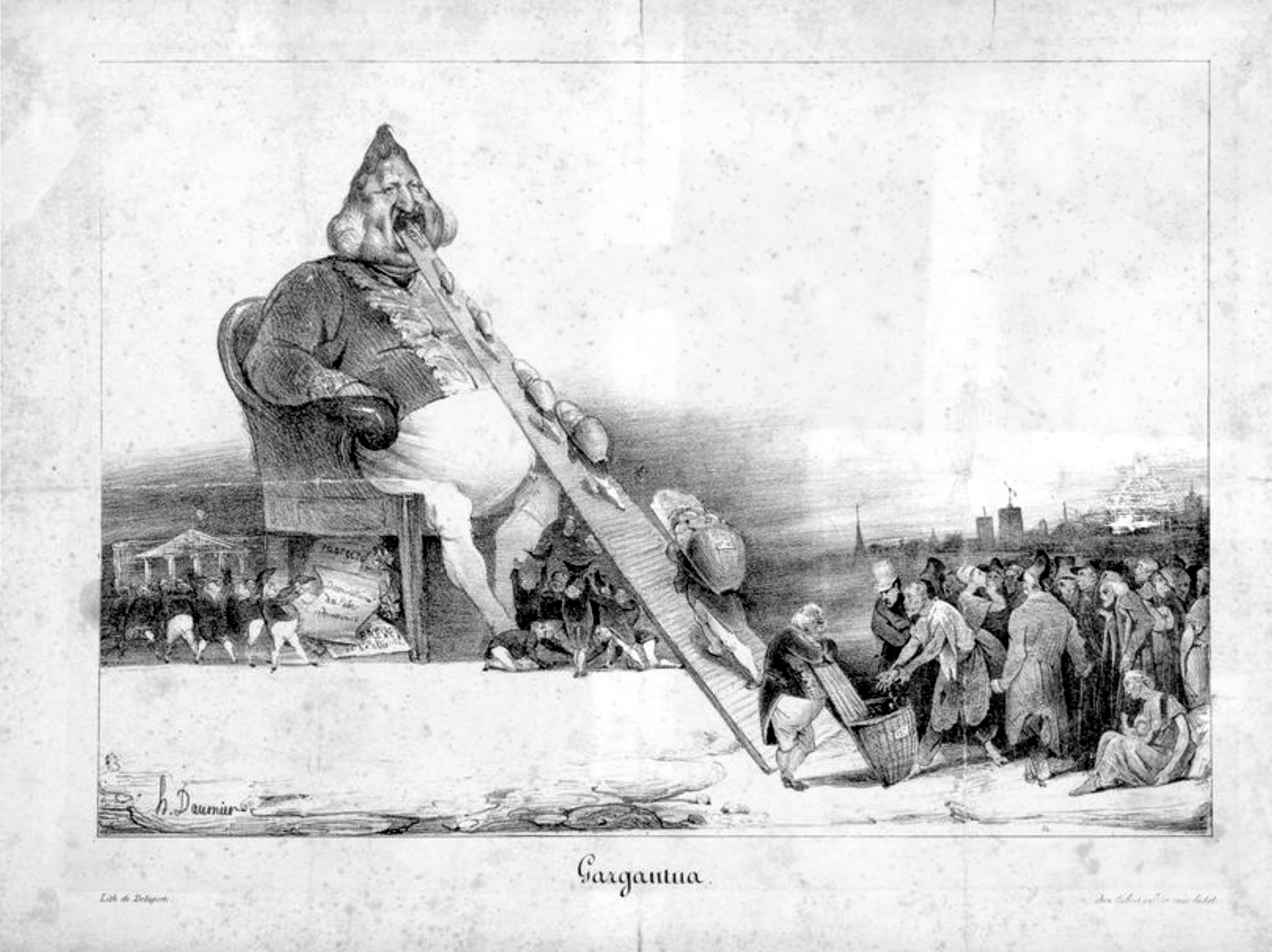
In this 1831 lithograph, Honoré Daumier depicted King Louis Philippe as Gargantua, sitting on his throne (a close stool), consuming a continuous diet of tribute fed to him by various bureaucrats, dignitaries, and bourgeoisie, while defecating a steady stream of titles, awards, and medals in return. Daumier was prosecuted in 1832 for this unflattering depiction of the King.

In the wake of Rabelais' book the word gargantuan (glutton) emerged, which in Hebrew is גרגרן Gargrån. French ravaler, following betacism a likely etymology of his name, means to swallow, to clean.

=== English literature ===
There is evidence of deliberate and avowed imitation of Rabelais' style, in English, as early as 1534. The full extent of Rabelais' influence is complicated by the known existence of a chapbook, probably called The History of Gargantua, translated around 1567; and the Songes drolatiques Pantagruel (1565), ascribed to Rabelais, and used by Inigo Jones. This complication manifests itself, for example, in Shakespeare's As You Like It, where "Gargantua's mouth" is mentioned; but evidence that Shakespeare read Rabelais is only "suggestive". A list of those who quoted or alluded to Rabelais before he was translated includes: Ben Jonson, John Donne, John Webster, Francis Bacon, Robert Burton, and James VI and I. In intellectual circles, at the time, to quote or name Rabelais was "to signal an urban(e) wit, [and] good education"; though others, particularly Puritans, cited him with "dislike or contempt". Rabelais' fame and influence increased after Urquhart's translation; later, there were many perceptive imitators, including Jonathan Swift (Gulliver's Travels) and Laurence Sterne (Tristram Shandy). James Joyce's familiarity with Rabelais has been a vexed point, but "[t]here is now ample evidence both that Joyce was more familiar with Rabelais' work than he admitted and that he made use of it in Finnegans Wake".

== English translations ==
=== Urquhart and Motteux ===
The work was first translated into English by Thomas Urquhart (the first three books) and Peter Anthony Motteux (the fourth and fifth) in the late seventeenth-century. Terence Cave, in an introduction to an Everyman's Library edition, notes that both adapted the anti-Catholic satire. Moreover,

The translation is also extremely free. Urquhart's rendering of the first three books is half as long again as the original. Many of the additions spring from a cheerful espousal of Rabelais's copious style. [...] Le Motteux is a little more restrained, but he too makes no bones about adding material of his own. [...] It is a literary work in its own right.

J. M. Cohen, in the preface to his translation, says Urquhart's part is "more like a brilliant recasting and expansion than a translation"; but criticised Motteux's as "no better than competent hackwork... [W]here Urquhart often enriches, he invariably impoverishes". Likewise, M. A. Screech says that the "translation of Urquhart and Motteux [...] is at times a recasting [...] rather than a translation"; and says it "remains a joy to read for its own self". Donald M. Frame, with his own translation, says he finds "Sir Thomas Urquhart [...] savory and picturesque but too much Urquhart and at times too little R". (Note: Throughout Frame's edition, only Urquhart exists; there is no Motteux.)

The translation has been used for many editions, including that of Britannica's Great Books of the Western World.

From The Third Book, Chapter Seven:

Copsbody, this is not the Carpet whereon my Treasurer shall be allowed to play false in his Accompts with me, by setting down an X for an V, or an L for an S; for in that case, should I make a hail of Fisti-cuffs to fly into his face.

=== Smith ===
William Francis Smith (1842–1919) made a translation in 1893, trying to match Rabelais' sentence forms exactly, which renders the English obscure in places. For example, the convent prior exclaims against Friar John when the latter bursts into the chapel,

What will this drunken Fellow do here? Let one take me him to prison. Thus to disturb divine Service!

Smith's version includes copious notes.

Donald M. Frame, with his own translation, says that Smith "was an excellent scholar; but he shuns R's obscenities and lacks his raciness".

=== Putnam ===
Also well annotated is an abridged but vivid translation of 1946 by Samuel Putnam, which appears in a Viking Portable edition that was still in print as late as 1968. Putnam omitted sections he believed of lesser interest to modern readers, including the entirety of the fifth book. The annotations occur every few pages, explain obscure references, and fill the reader in as to original content excised by him.

Donald M. Frame, with his own translation, calls Putnam's edition "arguably the best we have"; (Note: It is not clear whether Frame is valuing translation, annotation, or both.) but notes that "English versions of Rabelais [...] all have serious weaknesses".

=== Cohen ===
John Michael Cohen's modern translation, first published in 1955 by Penguin, "admirably preserves the frankness and vitality of the original", according to its back cover, although it provides limited explanation of Rabelais' word-plays and allusions.

Donald M. Frame, with his own translation, says that Cohen's, "although in the main sound, is marred by his ignorance of sixteenth-century French".

=== Frame ===
An annotated translation of Rabelais' complete works by Donald M. Frame was published posthumously in 1991. In a translator's note, he says: "My aim in this version, as always, is fidelity (which is not always literalness): to put into standard American English what I think R would (or at least might) have written if he were using that English today."

Frame's edition, according to Terence Cave, "is to be recommended not only because it contains the complete works but also because the translator was an internationally renowned specialist in French Renaissance studies".

However, M. A. Screech, with his own translation, says: "I read Donald Frame's translation [...] but have not regularly done so since", noting that "[h]ad he lived he would have eliminated [...] the gaps, errors and misreadings of his manuscript". Barbara C. Bowen has similar misgivings, saying that Frame's translation "gives us the content, probably better than most others, but cannot give us the flavor of Rabelais's text"; and, elsewhere, says it is "better than nothing".

From The Third Book, Chapter Seven:

'Odsbody! On this bureau of mine my paymaster had better not play around with stretching the esses, or my fists would go trotting all over him!

=== Screech ===
Penguin published a translation by M. A. Screech in 2006 which incorporates textual variants; and brief notes on sources, puns, and allusions. In a translator's note, he says: "My aim here for Rabelais (as for my Penguin Montaigne) is to turn him loyally into readable and enjoyable English."

From The Third Book, Chapter Seven:

Crikey. My accountant had better not play about on my bureau, stretching esses into efs - sous into francs! Otherwise blows from my fist would trot all over his dial!

== List of English translations ==
=== Complete translations ===
1. Thomas Urquhart (1653) and Peter Anthony Motteux (1694)
  1. Thomas Urquhart (1653) and Peter Anthony Motteux (1694), revised by John Ozell (1737)
  2. Thomas Urquhart (1653) and Peter Anthony Motteux (1694), revised by Alfred Wallis (1897)
2. William Francis Smith (1893)
3. Jacques Leclercq (1936)
4. Samuel Putnam (1948)
5. J. M. Cohen (1955)
6. Burton Raffel (1990)
7. Donald M. Frame (1991)
8. Michael Andrew Screech (2006)

=== Partial translation ===
Andrew Brown (2003; revised 2018); books 1 and 2 only

== Illustrations ==
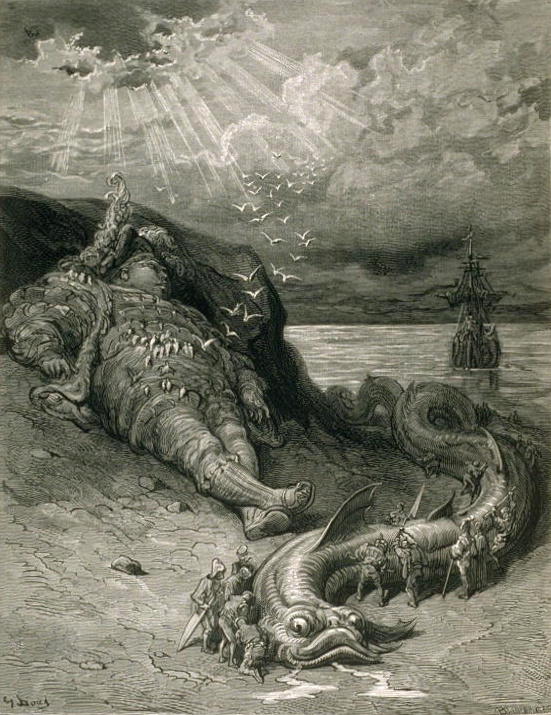
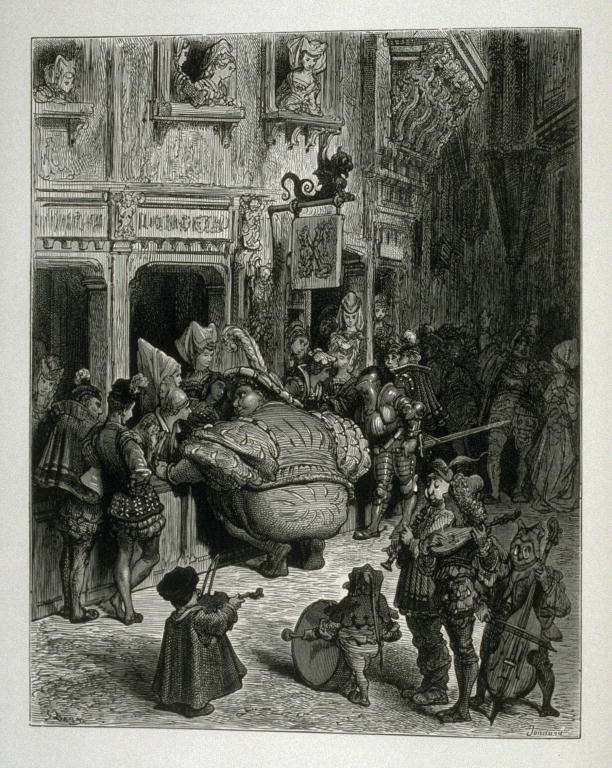

An example of the giants' shift in body size, above where people are the size of Pantagruel's foot, and below where Gargantua is under twice the height of a human.

The most famous and reproduced illustrations for Gargantua and Pantagruel were done by French artist Gustave Doré and published in 1854. Over 400 additional drawings were done by Doré for the 1873 second edition of the book. An edition published in 1904 was illustrated by W. Heath Robinson. Another set of illustrations was created by French artist Joseph Hémard and published in 1922. Frank C. Papé illustrated an edition published in 1927.

The first two books were the basis for the 1979 comic book Gargantua e Pantagruel by Dino Battaglia.

== See also ==
- Abbey of Thelema
- Erasmus
- French Renaissance
- French Renaissance literature
- The Honest Woodcutter
- Lucian
- Mammotrectus super Bibliam – criticised in Gargantua
- Mirapolis, a former French theme park with Gargantua as icon
- Perrin Dandin, a character from the Third Book
- Priapus
- Silenus
- A Rabelaisian Fragment, precursor to Tristam Shandy
- The BFG by Roald Dahl
- Tall tales
- Gulliver’s Travels
- Baron Munchausen
