= Mojette =

Mojette may refer to:

- Mojette beans, a kind of French beans
- Mojette transform, an exact discrete Radon transform
