= Fougasse (bread) =

Type of French bread

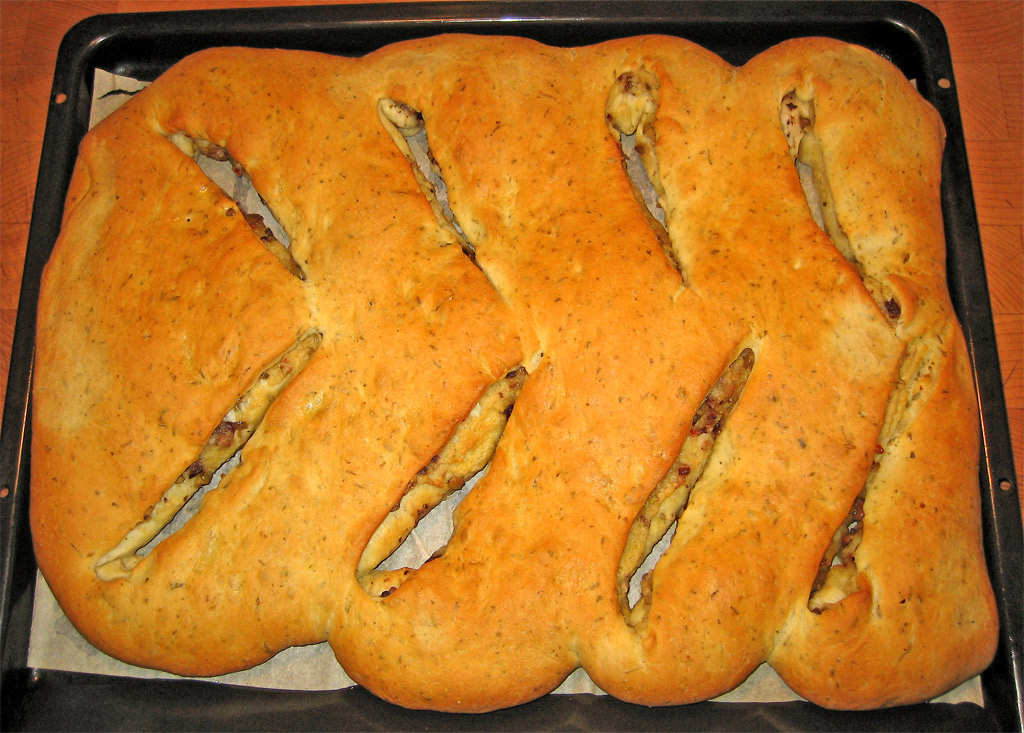
- Type: Bread
- Place of origin: France
- Region or state: Provence
- Associated cuisine: French cuisine

In French cuisine, fougasse (French pronunciation: [fuɡas]; Occitan: fogaça) is a type of bread typically associated with Provence but found (with variations) in other regions. Some versions are sculpted or slashed into a pattern resembling a head of wheat.

== History and etymology ==
In ancient Rome, panis focacius was a flatbread baked in the ashes of the hearth (focus in Latin). This eventually became a diverse variety of breads that include focaccia in Italian cuisine, hogaza in Spain, fogassa in Catalonia, fugàssa in Ligurian, pogača in the Balkans, pogácsa in Hungary, fougasse in Provence (originally spelled fogatza), and fouace or fouée in other regions of France and on the Channel Islands. The Provence version is more likely to have additions like olives, cheese, garlic or anchovies.

Portugal is also home to fogaça, a sweet bread. In Brazil, pão sovado is a typical big fougasse, while a recipe called pão suíço is common to the states of Rio de Janeiro, Espírito Santo and surrounding regions. Pão suíço can be thought of as a halfway point between fougasse and bolillo, somewhat resembling a savory small brioche. They are perhaps the sweetest of savory artisanal bread recipes commonly made in Brazil.

Fougasse was traditionally used to assess the temperature of a wood-fired oven. The time it takes to bake gives an idea of the oven temperature and whether the rest of the bread can be loaded (hence the French phrase "il ne faut pas brûler la fougasse": "one must not burn the fougasse").

The term fougasse is also used to refer to a type of pastry from Monaco that is topped with almonds and nuts.

== Use in dishes ==
Fougasse may be used to make the French version of a calzone, commonly filled with cheese and small strips of bacon inside the pocket made by folding the bread over. Other variations include dried fruit, Roquefort and nuts, or olives and goat cheese.
