= Michael Andrew Screech =

Michael Andrew Screech, FBA (2 May 1926 – 1 June 2018), was a cleric and a professor of French literature with special interests in the Renaissance, Montaigne and Rabelais.

== Wartime service ==
In 1943, Screech entered University College London to read French but after a language aptitude test, he was sent to the secret Bedford Japanese School run by Captain Oswald Tuck RN. He was in the 8th course at Bedford (October 1944 to April 1945), and after completing it he was posted to the Wireless Experimental Centre, Delhi, India, which was an outpost of Bletchley Park. After the Japanese surrender, he was posted to Japan and was stationed in Kure and Tottori as part of the British Commonwealth Occupation Force until 1947.

== Academic career ==
In the years 1961–84 he was the Fielden Professor of French Language and Literature, at the University College, University of London. From 1993 to 2001 he was a Fellow of All Souls College. On retirement, he was ordained priest in the Church of England. From 2003 to 2018 he was Emeritus Fellow of All Souls College, Oxford, where he also served as Interim Chaplain. He was concurrently an extraordinary fellow of Wolfson College, Oxford

In 1992, he was honoured as a Chevalier in the French Legion of Honor. His translation of Montaigne's Essays has been widely recognized. His translation of the François Rabelais novel series Gargantua and Pantagruel was also described by Barbara C. Bowen as "faithful, lively, and readable [...] the best to date; it preserves much of the sheer exuberance of the original, while incorporating essential background information missing from most of its predecessors."

== Selected publications ==
=== M. A. Screech as author ===
- The Rabelaisian Marriage (Edward Arnold, 1958)
- L'Evangélisme de Rabelais (Droz, 1959)
- Marot Evangélique (Droz, 1967)
- Erasmus: Ecstasy and the Praise of Folly (Duckworth, 1980)
- Montaigne and Melancholy (Duckworth, 1983)
- A New Rabelais Bibliography: Editions of Rabelais Before 1626 (Droz, 1987)
- Some Renaissance Studies (Droz, 1992)
- Clément Marot, a Renaissance poet discovers the Gospel (E. J. Brill, 1993)
- Laughter at the Foot of the Cross (Allen Lane/Penguin, 1997)

=== M. A. Screech as editor ===
- Joachim DuBellay, Les Regrets et autres Oeuvres Poétiques: suivis des Antiquitez de Rome; plus Un songe, ou Vision sur le mesme subject (Droz, 1966). Joint editor: J. Joliffe.
- François Rabelais, Pantagrueline Prognostication pour l'an 1533. Avec les Almanachs pour les ans 1533, 1535 et 1541. La grande et vraye Pronostication nouvelle de 1544 (Droz, 1975)

== Selected translations ==
- Montaigne: Essays (1991)
- Rabelais: Gargantua and Pantagruel (2006)
