= Jeanne de La Saulcée =

French publisher, printer (d. 1559)

Jeanne de La Saulcée, known as the widow of Barnabé Chaussard, born at the end of the 15th century and died in 1559, was a French publisher, printer and bookseller, established in Lyon during the Renaissance.

== Biography ==
Born Jeanne de La Saulcée at the end of the 15th century, on an unknown date. In 1516, she married the Lyon printer-publisher Barnabé Chaussard and brought him as a dowry of half a house located “rue Mercière, near Notre-Dame-de-Confort," situated between the bookseller Aimé de La Porte and the printer François Fradin. Chaussard set up his printing house there. The couple had six children, four daughters and two sons.

Barnabé Chaussard died at the end of 1527 while Jeanne's two sons, heirs to the business, were still minors, so she took over as head of the printing operation, publishing house and bookstore, under the name of her late husband.

After her remarriage to her workshop manager Jean Lambany at the end of 1528, she left the company's management to her new husband, who published under his own name. Widowed again in December 1529, she changed the company name to: “Veuve de Barnabé Chaussard” (Widow of Barnabé Chaussard).

In June 1533, she married for the third time, this time to her former protege, Jean Cantarel, known as “Motin” who managed the business from 1533 to 1552 under the name “In the house of the late Barnabé Chaussard.” In 1552, when Barnabé's two sons, François and Benoît Chaussard, came of age, Jeanne de La Saulcée left the management of the printing company to them.

Unlike Charlotte Guillard, the printing press did not directly bear Jeanne's first name but instead it reflected her married name and her status as a widow, committing to paying her taxes and employing a man for tasks falling within the male domain she was however one of the rare female figures of the Lyon humanist printing press with seven other widows.

She died in Lyon in 1559.

== Selected works ==
Notably, Jeanne's company published Les Grandes et Inestimables Chroniques du grand et enormous giant Gargantua, by François Rabelais, printed in 1532 in a small format of which only four copies are known.

== Bibliography ==
- Miellet, Clémence (2014). "Barnabé Chaussard et ses successeurs: 1492-1560" (PDF) (in French).
