= Picrochole =

Bad king triggering absurd conflicts for insignificant reasons

Picrochole is a fictional character created by François Rabelais, who attacks the Kingdom of Grandgousier in the novel Gargantua and Pantagruel. He gives his name to the war he fights: la guerre picrocholine.

Picrochole is a stereotypical bad king, whom Rabelais seeks to deride by putting him in apposition to the good king, represented by Grandgousier, Gargantua's father.

The expression guerre picrocholine (Picrocholine War) and the adjective picrocholin have since entered the French language, meaning an absurd conflict with futile motives.

== Origin ==
"Picrochole" comes from the Greek words πικρός (pikros) meaning "bitter" and χολή (chole) meaning "bile", and signifies his dark and acerbic moods. Above all, Picrochole is a man who takes on enormous projects that he has no chance of completing.
