= Grandgousier =

Grandgousier (French: grand gosier, "Big Throat") is a fictional character in the story of Gargantua by François Rabelais. He is the husband of Gargamelle (the daughter of the King of Papillons) and the father of Gargantua.

A Rabelaisien character par excellence, he has an appreciation of good living, good heart, and all of life's pleasures.

Grandgousier represents a stereotypical good king, in apposition to the bad king of Picrochole. He advocates peace and discussion over war and greed.
