= Barbara C. Bowen =

British professor of French literature (1937–2019)

- Born: 4 May 1937; United Kingdom
- Died: 19 November 2019 (aged 82); Nashville, Tennessee
- Citizenship: United Kingdom
- Education: Oxford University; University of Paris
- Occupations: Educator, scholar
- Employer(s): University of Illinois; Vanderbilt University
- Spouse: Vincent Bowen
- Children: 2

Barbara C. Bowen (4 May 1937 – 19 November 2019) was a British professor of French and a prominent Renaissance scholar active in the United States. She was a professor emerita at Vanderbilt University, where she was the first woman to lead a department in the College of Arts.

== Life and education ==
Bowen was born in Great Britain on 4 May 1937. She developed an interest in French language and literature from the age of 10. She received a Bachelor of Arts and a Master of Arts from Oxford University, and later a Doctorate at the University of Paris in 1962.

Bowen died on 19 November 2019, at her home in Nashville, Tennessee, at the age of 82, following a recurrence of lymphoma.

== Career ==
Bowen taught at the University of Illinois before being recruited to Vanderbilt University in 1987, where she was appointed professor of French and chair of the Department of French and Italian. She was the first woman to lead a department in the College of Arts and Science at Vanderbilt.

Bowen's research interests included François Rabelais and 16th-century French literature, French comic theatre, European Renaissance humor, and Renaissance art history. She was the author of five major books, including Enter Rabelais, Laughing (1998) and Humor and Humanism (2004), an anthology of her articles.

She served as president of the Renaissance Society of America from 1996 to 1998. Bowen received fellowships from the John Simon Guggenheim Memorial Foundation and the National Endowment for the Humanities, which enabled her to spend a year at the Villa I Tatti in Florence, Italy.

Bowen taught graduate seminars in French and comparative literature, as well as undergraduate courses ranging from "Renaissance Utopias" to "The Classic French Comic Book." She also served on the Faculty Senate and various university committees. After becoming an emerita professor in 2002, Bowen continued her research and writing.

In 1974, she was awarded a Guggenheim Fellowship.

== Selected publications ==
- Les caractéristiques essentielles de la farce française, et leur survivance dans les années 1550–1620. Urbana, IL: University of Illinois Press, 1964.
- The Age of Bluff: Paradox and Ambiguity in Rabelais and Montaigne. Urbana, IL: University of Illinois Press, 1972.
- Words and the Man in French Renaissance Literature. Lexington, Kentucky: French Forum Monographs, 1983.
- Enter Rabelais, Laughing. Nashville: Vanderbilt University Press, 1998.
- Humour and Humanism in the Renaissance. 2004.
