= Perrin Dandin =

Perrin Dandin is a fictional character in the Third Book of Rabelais, who seats himself judge-wise on the first stump that offers, and passes offhand a sentence in any matter of litigation; a character who figures similarly in a comedy of Racine's, and in a fable of La Fontaine's.
