= Fouée =

French type of bread

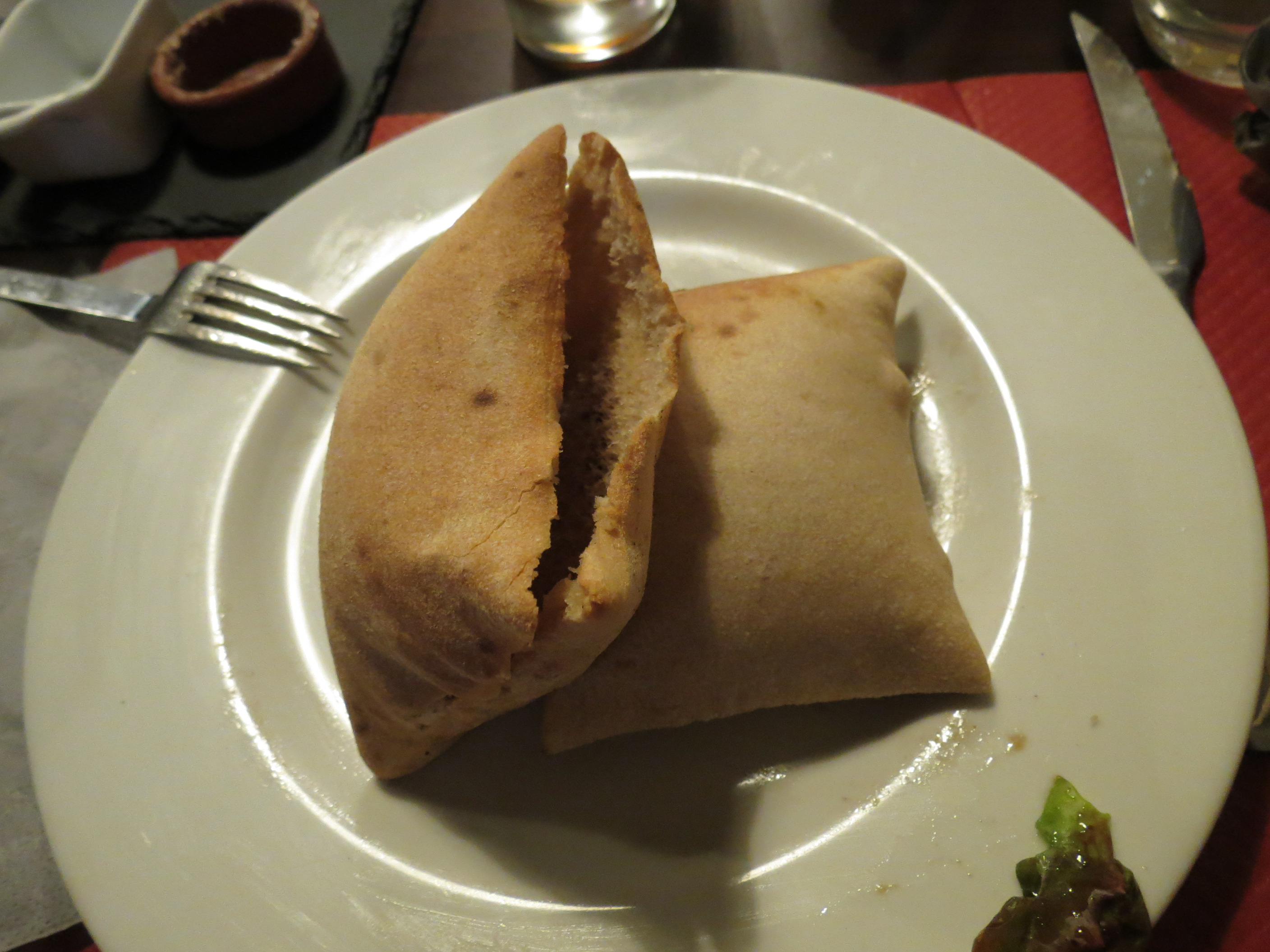
Fouaces angevines

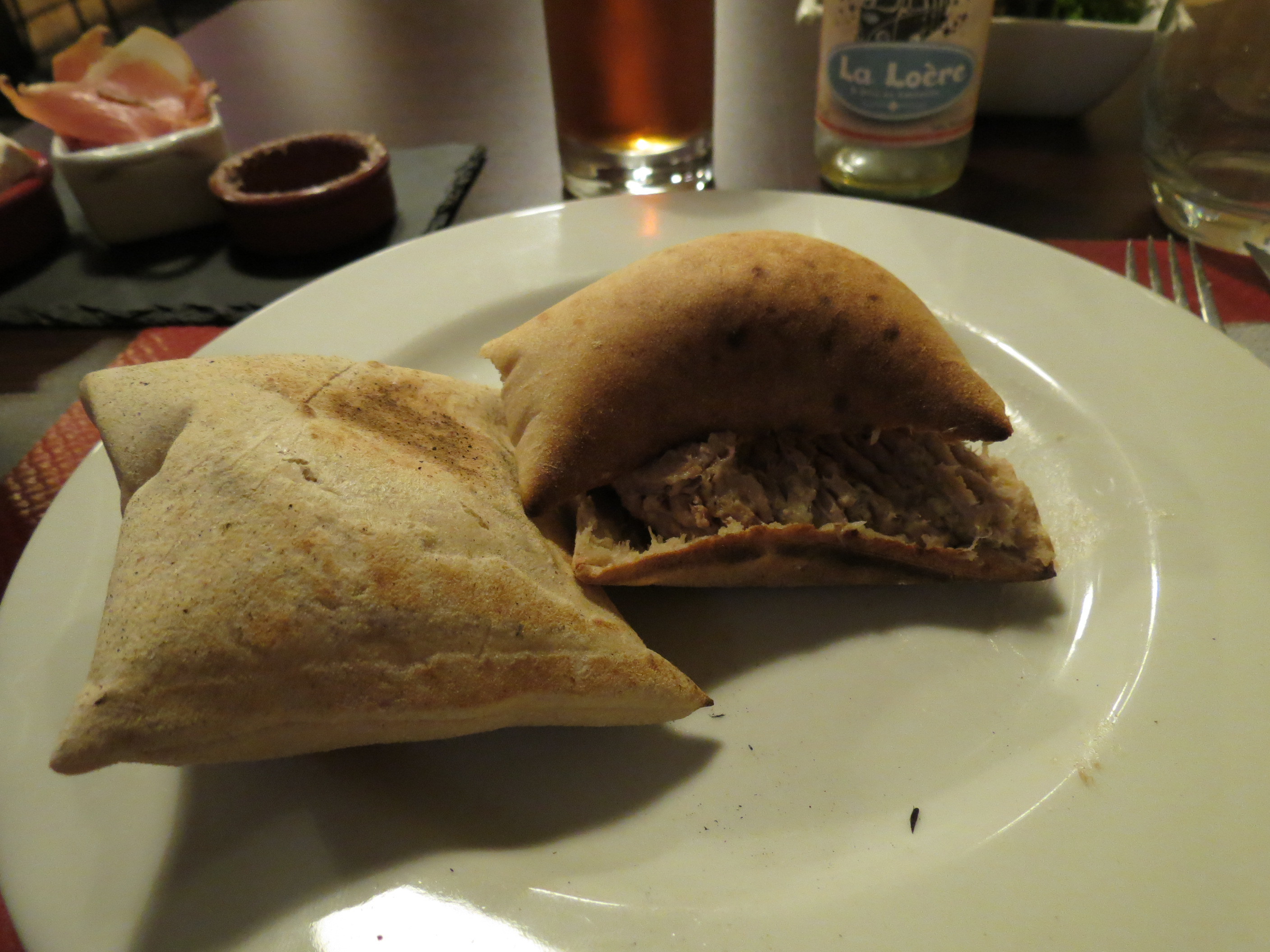
Fouées with rillettes

Fouée (French pronunciation: [fwe]), also known as fouace ([fwas]), is an airy bread from western France (Touraine and Anjou region of the Loire Valley, Poitou, Charente). It looks somewhat similar to pita or bakpao. It is split and served with pork rillettes, salted butter and mogettes (white beans).

It is distinct from another French culinary specialty, fouace or fouasse, from southern France (Rouergue, Aveyron and Haute-Auvergne). This is a traditional variety of brioche with a light-yellow crumb and a fine crust, often strewn with sugar grains. It is prepared from wheat flour, sourdough, butter, eggs, milk, sugar, orange flower water, and salt, is usually presented in the shape of a crown or bun and can be enjoyed for breakfast, aperitif or dessert.
