= Mojette beans =

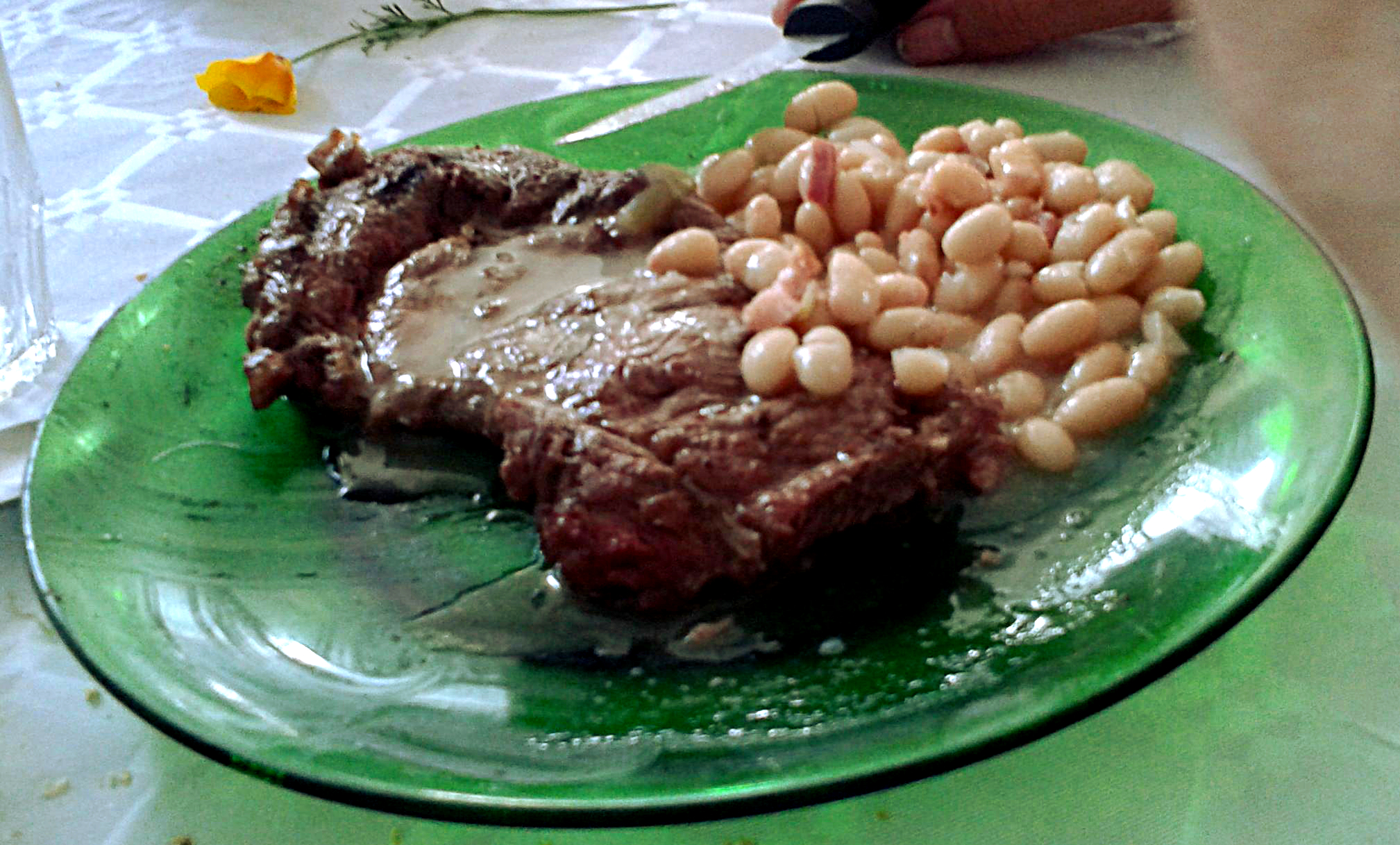
Mogette beans prepared alongside a meat main dish, typically ham from Vendée.

Mojette beans or mogette beans are white beans native to the New World and traditionally eaten in the French department of Vendée in the region of Pays de la Loire. They are smooth, fine and almost rectangular.

Mojette beans are traditionally eaten on a grilled slice of bread with salted butter and, optionally, ham from Vendée.

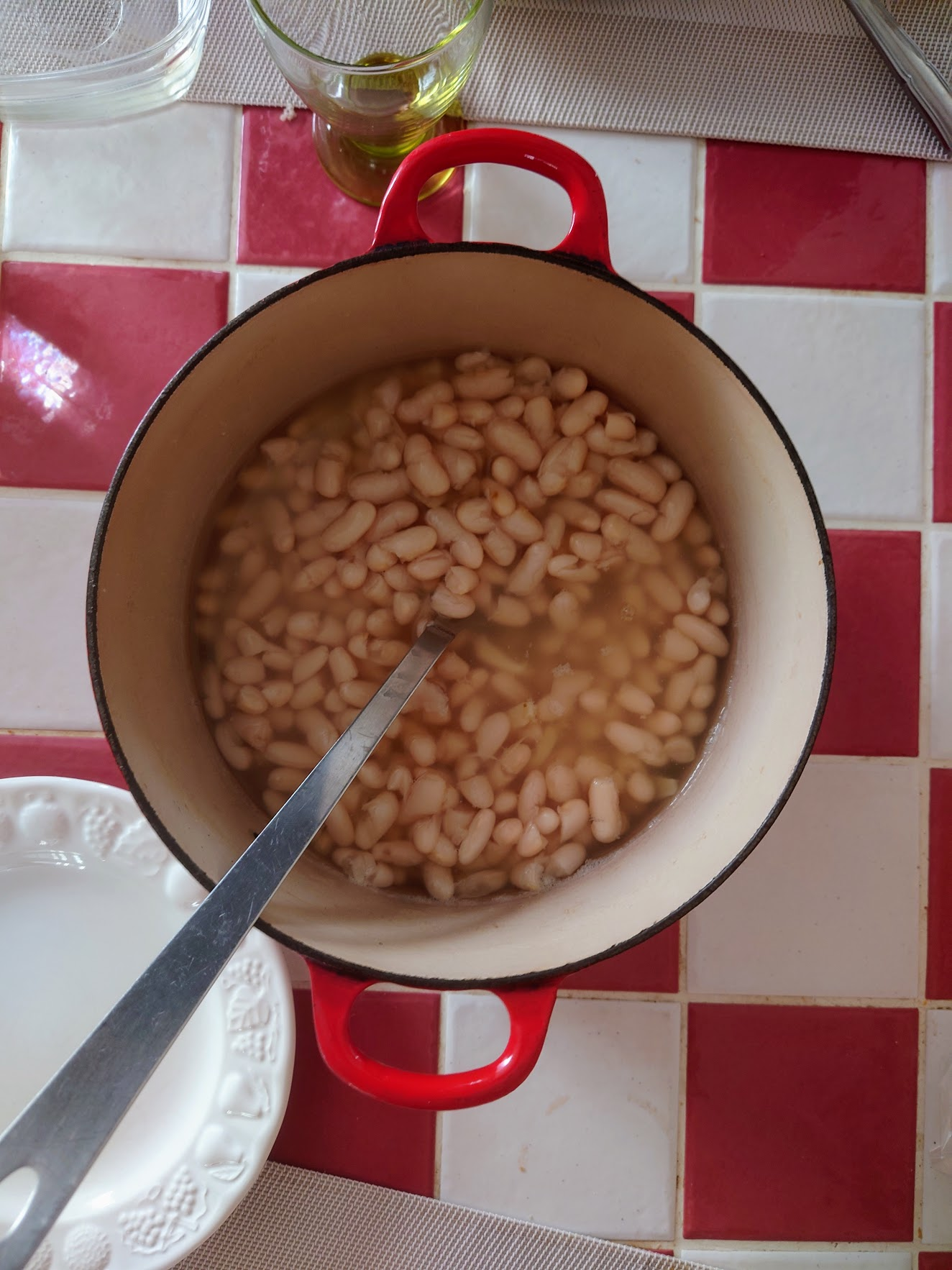
Mojette bean dish
