= Duchaussoy =

Duchaussoy is a French surname. Notable people with the surname include:

- Herménégilde Duchaussoy (1854–1934), French meteorologist
- Jacques Duchaussoy (1905–1995), French author
- Michel Duchaussoy (1938–2012), French film actor
