= Baconian theory of Shakespeare authorship =

Alternative Shakespeare authorship theory

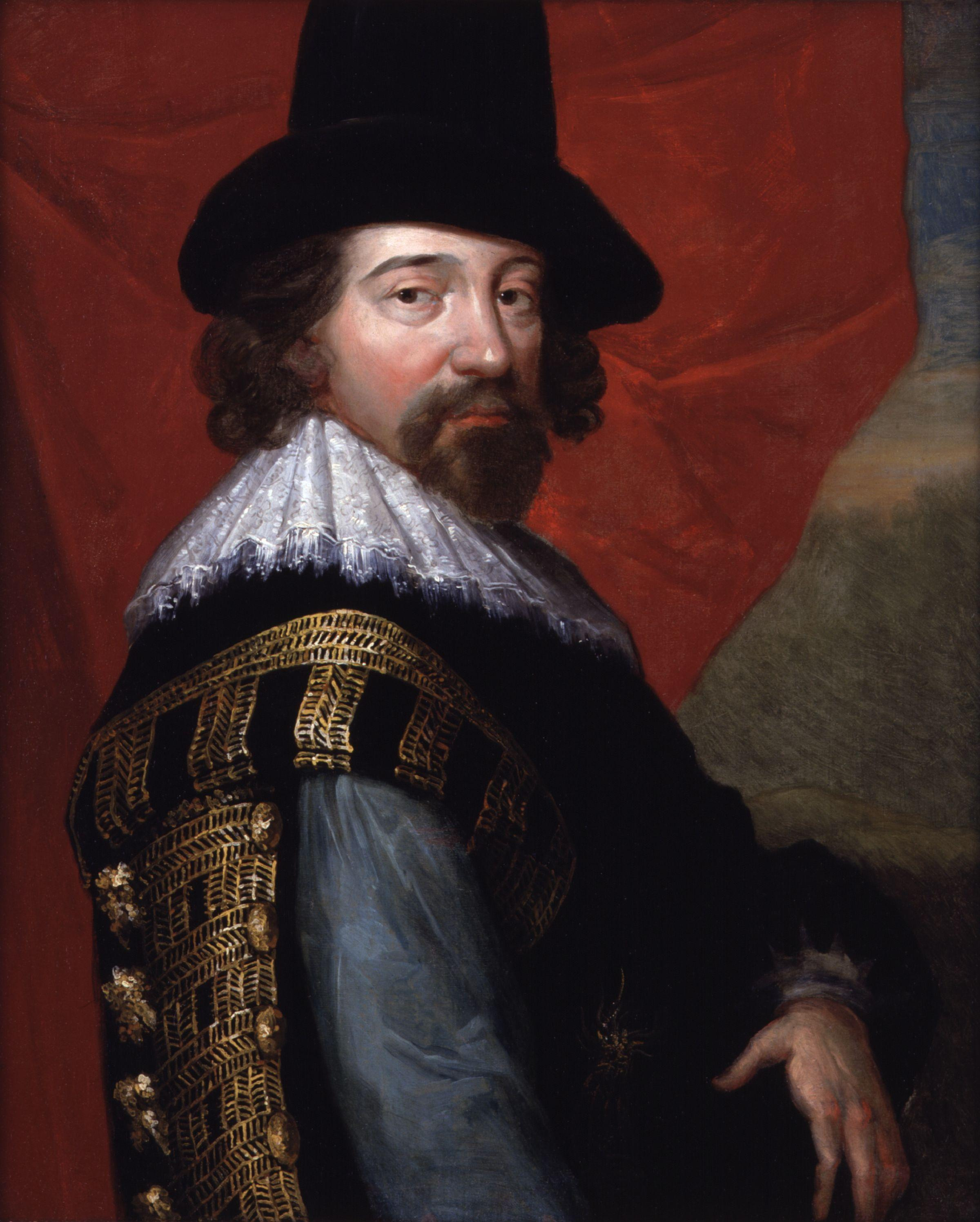
Sir Francis Bacon

The Baconian theory of Shakespearean authorship contends that Sir Francis Bacon, philosopher, essayist and scientist, wrote the plays that are attributed to William Shakespeare. Various explanations are offered for this alleged subterfuge, most commonly that Bacon's rise to high office might have been hindered if it became known that he wrote plays for the public stage. The plays are credited to Shakespeare, who, supporters of the theory claim, was merely a front to shield the identity of Bacon. All but a few academic Shakespeare scholars reject the arguments for Bacon authorship, as well as those for all other alternative authors.

The theory was first put forth in the mid-nineteenth century, based on perceived correspondences between the philosophical ideas found in Bacon’s writings and the works of Shakespeare. Legal and autobiographical allusions and cryptographic ciphers and codes were later found in the plays and poems to buttress the theory. The Baconian theory gained popularity and attention in the late nineteenth and early twentieth century. The academic consensus is that Shakespeare wrote the works bearing his name. Supporters of Bacon continue to argue for his candidacy through organisations, books, newsletters, and websites.

== Terminology ==
Sir Francis Bacon (1561 – 1626) was an English scientist, philosopher, courtier, diplomat, essayist, historian and successful politician who served as Solicitor General in 1607, Attorney General in 1613 and Lord Chancellor in 1618. Those who subscribe to the theory that Bacon wrote Shakespeare's works refer to themselves as "Baconians", while dubbing those who maintain the orthodox view that William Shakespeare of Stratford wrote his own works "Stratfordians".

Baptised as "Gulielmus filius Johannes Shakspere" (William son of John Shakspere) on 26 April 1564, the traditionally accepted author's surname had several variant spellings during his lifetime, but his signature is most commonly spelled "Shakspere". Baconians often use "Shakspere" or "Shakespeare" for the glover's son and actor from Stratford, and "Shake-speare" for the author to avoid the assumption that the Stratford man wrote the works attributed to him.

== History of Baconian theory ==
A pamphlet entitled The Story of the Learned Pig (circa 1786) and alleged research by James Wilmot have been described by some as the earliest instances of the claim that Bacon wrote Shakespeare's works, but the Wilmot research has been exposed as a forgery, and the pamphlet makes no direct reference to Bacon. (Note: The argument concerning the pamphlet depends on the assumption that the "pig" is a coded reference to the name "bacon".)

The idea was first proposed by Delia Bacon (no relation) in lectures and conversations with intellectuals in America and Britain. William Henry Smith was the first to publish the theory in a letter to Lord Ellesmere published in the form of a sixteen-page pamphlet entitled Was Lord Bacon the Author of Shakespeare's Plays? Smith suggested that several letters to and from Francis Bacon hinted at his authorship. A year later, both Smith and Delia Bacon published books expounding the Baconian theory. In Delia Bacon's work, "Shakespeare" was represented as a group of writers, including Francis Bacon, Sir Walter Raleigh and Edmund Spenser, whose agenda was to propagate an anti-monarchical system of philosophy by secreting it in the text.

In 1867, in the library of Northumberland House, John Bruce happened upon a bundle of bound documents, some of whose sheets had been ripped away. It had comprised a number of Bacon's oratories and disquisitions, and had also apparently held copies of the plays Richard II and Richard III, The Isle of Dogs and Leicester's Commonwealth, but these had been removed. On the outer sheet was scrawled repeatedly the names of Bacon and Shakespeare along with the name of Thomas Nashe. There were several quotations from Shakespeare and a reference to the word Honorificabilitudinitatibus, which appears in Shakespeare's Love's Labour's Lost and Nashe's Lenten Stuff. The Earl of Northumberland sent the bundle to James Spedding, who subsequently penned a thesis on the subject, with which was published a facsimile of the aforementioned cover. Spedding hazarded a 1592 date, making it possibly the earliest extant mention of Shakespeare.

After a diligent deciphering of the Elizabethan handwriting in Francis Bacon's notebook, known as the Promus of Formularies and Elegancies, Constance Mary Fearon Pott (1833–1915) argued that a number of the ideas and figures of speech in Bacon's book could also be found in the Shakespeare plays. Pott founded the Francis Bacon Society in 1885 and published her Bacon-centered theory in 1891. In this, Pott developed the view of W.F.C. Wigston, that Francis Bacon was the founding member of the Rosicrucians, a secret society of occult philosophers, and claimed that they secretly created art, literature and drama, including the entire Shakespeare canon, before adding the symbols of the rose and cross rug to their work. William Comyns Beaumont also popularised the notion of Bacon's authorship.

Other Baconians ignored the esoteric following that the theory was attracting. Bacon's reason for publishing under a pseudonym was said to be his need to secure his high office, possibly in order to complete his "Great Instauration" project to reform the moral and intellectual culture of the nation. The argument is that Bacon intended to set up new institutes of experimentation to gather the data to which his inductive method could be applied. He needed high office to gain the requisite influence, and being known as a dramatist, an allegedly low-class profession, would have impeded his prospects (see stigma of print). Realising that play-acting was used by the ancients "as a means of educating men's minds to virtue", and being "strongly addicted to the theatre" himself, he is claimed to have set out the otherwise-unpublished moral philosophical component of his Great Instauration project in the Shakespearean oeuvre. In this way, he could influence the nobility through dramatic performance with his observations on what constitutes "good" government.

By the end of the 19th century, Baconian theory had received support from a number of high-profile individuals. Mark Twain showed an inclination for it in his essay Is Shakespeare Dead?. Friedrich Nietzsche expressed interest in and gave credence to the Baconian theory in his writings. The German mathematician Georg Cantor believed that Shakespeare was Bacon. He eventually published two pamphlets supporting the theory in 1896 and 1897. By 1900, leading Baconians were asserting that their cause would soon be won. In 1916 a judge in Chicago ruled in a civil trial that Bacon was the true author of the Shakespeare canon. However, this proved to be the heyday of the theory. A number of new candidates were proposed in the early 20th century, notably Roger Manners, 5th Earl of Rutland, William Stanley, 6th Earl of Derby and Edward de Vere, 17th Earl of Oxford, dethroning Bacon as the sole alternative to Shakespeare. Furthermore, these and other alternative authorship theories failed to make any headway among academics.

=== Baconian cryptology ===
In 1880 Ignatius L. Donnelly, a U.S. Congressman, science fiction author and Atlantis theorist, wrote The Great Cryptogram, in which he argued that Bacon revealed his authorship of the works by concealing secret ciphers in the text. This produced a plethora of late 19th-century Baconian theorising, which developed the theme that Bacon had hidden encoded messages in the plays.

Baconian theory developed a new twist in the writings of Orville Ward Owen and Elizabeth Wells Gallup. Owen's book Sir Francis Bacon's Cipher Story (1893–95) claimed to have discovered a secret history of the Elizabethan era hidden in cipher form in Bacon/Shakespeare's works. The most remarkable revelation was that Bacon was the son of Queen Elizabeth. According to Owen, Bacon revealed that Elizabeth was secretly married to Robert Dudley, Earl of Leicester, who fathered both Bacon himself and Robert Devereux, 2nd Earl of Essex, the latter ruthlessly executed by his own mother in 1601. Bacon was the true heir to the throne of England, but had been excluded from his rightful place. This tragic life story was the secret hidden in the plays.

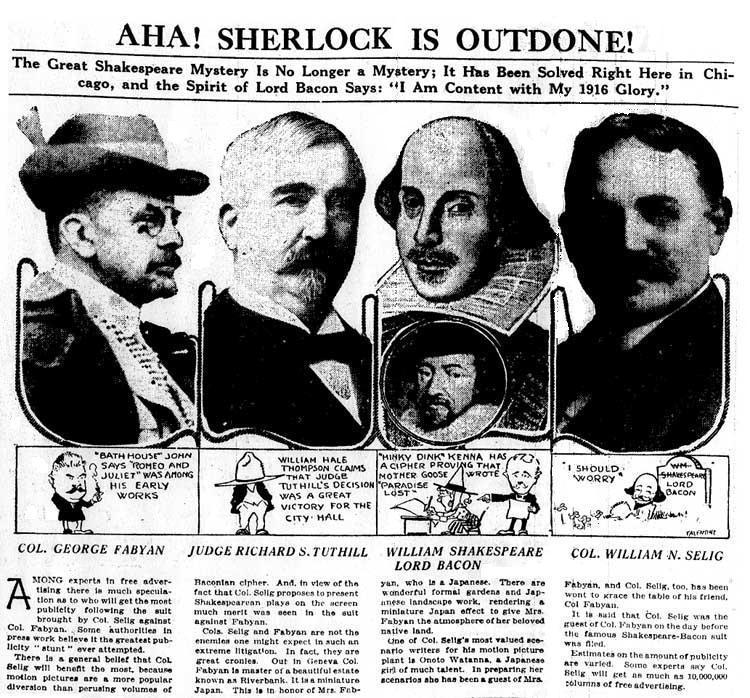
A feature in the Chicago Tribune on the 1916 trial of Shakespeare's authorship. From left: George Fabyan; Judge Tuthill; Shakespeare and Bacon; William Selig.

Elizabeth Wells Gallup developed Owen's views, arguing that a bi-literal cipher, which she had identified in the First Folio of Shakespeare's works, revealed concealed messages confirming that Bacon was the queen's son. This argument was taken up by several other writers, notably Alfred Dodd in Francis Bacon’s Personal Life Story (1910) and C.Y.C. Dawbarn in Uncrowned (1913). In Dodd's account Bacon was a national redeemer, who, deprived of his ordained public role as monarch, instead performed a spiritual transformation of the nation in private though his work: "He was born for England, to set the land he loved on new lines, 'to be a Servant to Posterity'". In 1916 Gallup's financial backer George Fabyan was sued by film producer William Selig. He argued that Fabyan's advocacy of Bacon threatened the profits expected from a forthcoming film about Shakespeare. The judge determined that ciphers identified by Gallup proved that Francis Bacon was the author of the Shakespeare canon, awarding Fabyan $5,000 in damages.

Orville Ward Owen had such conviction of his own cipher method that, in 1909, he began excavating the bed of the River Wye, near Chepstow Castle, in the search of Bacon's original Shakespearean manuscripts. The project ended with his death in 1924. Nothing was found.

The American art collector Walter Conrad Arensberg (1878–1954) believed that Bacon had concealed messages in a variety of ciphers, relating to a secret history of the time and the esoteric secrets of the Rosicrucians, in the Shakespearean works. He published a variety of decipherments between 1922 and 1930, concluding finally that, although he had failed to find them, there certainly were concealed messages. He established the Francis Bacon Foundation in California in 1937 and left it his collection of Baconiana.

In 1957 the expert cryptographers William and Elizebeth Friedman published The Shakespearean Ciphers Examined, a study of all the proposed ciphers identified by Baconians (and others) up to that point. The Friedmans had worked with Gallup. They showed that the method is unlikely to have been employed by the author of Shakespeare's works, concluding that none of the ciphers claimed to exist by Baconians were valid.

== Credentials for authorship ==
Early Baconians were influenced by Victorian bardolatry, which portrayed Shakespeare as a profound intellectual, "the greatest intellect who, in our recorded world, has left record of himself in the way of Literature", as Thomas Carlyle stated. In conformity with these ideas, Baconian writer Harry Stratford Caldecott held that the Shakespearean work was of such an incalculably higher calibre than that of contemporary playwrights that it could not possibly have been written by any of them. Even mainstream Shakespearean scholar Horace Howard Furness, wrote that "Had the plays come down to us anonymously – had the labour of discovering the author been imposed upon future generations – we could have found no one of that day but Francis Bacon to whom to assign the crown. In this case it would have been resting now upon his head by almost common consent." "He was," agreed Caldecott, "all the things that the plays of Shakespeare demand that the author should be – a man of vast and boundless ambition and attainments, a philosopher, a poet, a lawyer, a statesman."

Baconians have also argued that Shakespeare's works show a detailed scientific knowledge that, they claim, only Bacon could have possessed. Certain passages in Coriolanus, first published in 1623, are alleged to refer to the circulation of the blood, a theory known to Bacon through his friendship with William Harvey, but not made public until after Shakespeare's death in 1616. They also argue that Bacon has been praised for his poetic style, even in his prose works.

Opponents of this view argue that Shakespeare's erudition was greatly exaggerated by Victorian enthusiasts, and that the works display the typical knowledge of a man with a grammar-school education of the time. His Latin is derived from school books of the era. There is no record that any contemporary of Shakespeare referred to him as a learned writer or scholar. Ben Jonson and Francis Beaumont both refer to his lack of classical learning. If a university-trained playwright wrote the plays, it is hard to explain the multiple classical blunders in Shakespeare. Not only does he mistake the scansion of multiple classical names, in Troilus and Cressida he has Greeks and Trojans citing Plato and Aristotle a thousand years before their births. Willinsky suggests that most of Shakespeare's classical allusions were drawn from Thomas Cooper’s Thesaurus Linguae Romanae et Britannicae (1565), since a number of errors in that work are replicated in several of Shakespeare’s plays, and a copy of this book had been bequeathed to Stratford Grammar School by John Bretchgirdle for "the common use of scholars".

In addition, it is argued that Bacon's and Shakespeare's styles of writing are profoundly different, and that they use different vocabulary. Scott McCrea writes, "there is no answer for Bacon's different renderings of the same word – 'politiques' instead of 'politicians', or 'submiss' instead of the Author's 'submissive', or 'militar' instead of the Poet's 'military'. These are two different writers."

== Alleged coded references to Bacon's authorship ==
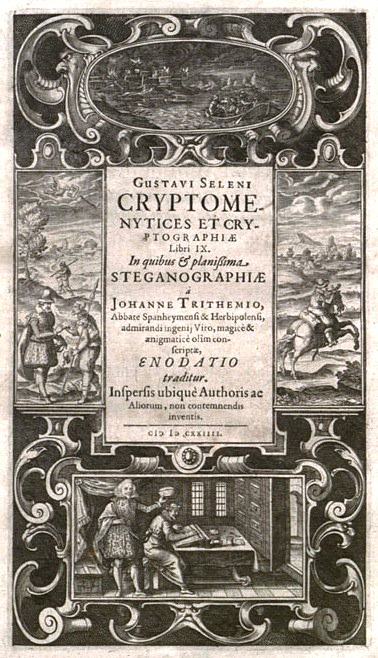
Title page of Cryptomenytices et Cryptographiae by Gustavus Selenus. Baconians have argued that this depicts Bacon writing the plays (bottom panel), giving them to a middle man, who passes them to Shakespeare (the man holding a spear in the middle-left panel)

Baconians have claimed that some contemporaries of Bacon and Shakespeare were in on the secret of Bacon's authorship, and have left hints of this in their writings. "There can be no doubt," said Caldecott, "that Ben Jonson was in possession of the secret composition of Shakespeare's works." An intimate of both Bacon and Shakespeare – he was for a time the former's stenographer and Latin interpreter, and had his debut as a playwright produced by the latter – he was placed perfectly to be in the know. He did not name Shakespeare among the sixteen greatest cards of the epoch but wrote of Bacon that he "hath filled up all the numbers and performed that in our tongue which may be compared or preferred either to insolent Greece and haughty Rome so that he may be named, and stand as the mark and acme of our language." Jonson's First-Folio tribute to "The Author Mr William Shakespeare",[...] contains the same words, stating that Shakespeare is as good as "all that insolent Greece or haughty Rome" produced. According to Caldecott, "If Ben Jonson knew that the name 'Shakespeare' was a mere cloak for Bacon, it is easy enough to reconcile the application of the same language indifferently to one and the other. Otherwise," declared Caldecott, "it is not easily explicable.".

Baconians Walter Begley and Bertram G. Theobald claimed that Elizabethan satirists Joseph Hall and John Marston alluded to Francis Bacon as the true author of Venus and Adonis and The Rape of Lucrece by using the sobriquet "Labeo" in a series of poems published in 1597–98. They take this to be a coded reference to Bacon on the grounds that the name derives from Rome's most famous legal scholar, Marcus Labeo, with Bacon holding an equivalent position in Elizabethan England. Hall denigrates several poems by Labeo and states that he passes off criticism to "shift it to another's name". This is taken to imply that he published under a pseudonym. In the following year Marston used Bacon's Latin motto in a poem and seems to quote from Venus and Adonis, which he attributes to Labeo. Theobald argued that this confirmed that Hall's Labeo was known to be Bacon and that he wrote Venus and Adonis. Critics of this view argue that the name Labeo derives from Attius Labeo, a notoriously bad poet, and that Hall's Labeo could refer to one of many poets of the time, or even be a composite figure, standing for the triumph of bad verse. Also, Marston's use of the Latin motto is a different poem from the one which alludes to Venus and Adonis. Only the latter uses the name Labeo, so there is no link between Labeo and Bacon.

In 1645 a satirical poem (often attributed to George Wither) was published entitled The Great Assizes Holden in Parnassus by Apollo and his Assessours. This describes an imaginary trial of recent writers for crimes against literature. Apollo presides at a trial. Bacon ("The Lord Verulam, Chancellor of Parnassus") heads a group of scholars who act as the judges. The jury comprises poets and playwrights, including "William Shakespeere". One of the convicted "criminals" challenges the court, attacking the credentials of the jury, including Shakespeare, who is called a mere "mimic". Despite the fact that Bacon and Shakespeare appear as different individuals, Baconians have argued that this is a coded assertion of Bacon's authorship of the canon, or at least proof that he was recognised as a poet.

Various images, especially in the frontispieces or title pages of books, have been said to contain symbolism pointing to Bacon's authorship. A book on codes and ciphers entitled Cryptomenytices et Cryptographiae, is said to depict Bacon writing a work and Shakespeare (signified by the spear he carries) receiving it. Other books with similar alleged coded imagery include the third edition of John Florio's translation of Montaigne, and various editions of works by Bacon himself.

== Gray's Inn revels 1594–95 and 1613 ==
Gray's Inn law school traditionally held revels over Easter 94 and '95, all performed plays were amateur productions. In his commentary on the Gesta Grayorum, a contemporary account of the 1594–95 revels, Desmond Bland informs us that they were "intended as a training ground in all the manners that are learned by nobility [...:] dancing, music, declamation, acting." James Spedding, the Victorian editor of Bacon's Works, thought that Sir Francis Bacon was involved in the writing of this account.

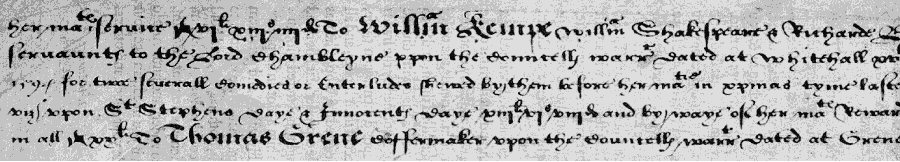
William Shakespeare remunerated for a performance at Whitehall on Innocents Day 1594.

The Gesta Grayorum is a pamphlet of 68 pages first published in 1688. It informs us that The Comedy of Errors received its first known performance at these revels at 21:00 on 28 December 1594 (Innocents Day) when "a Comedy of Errors (like to Plautus his Menechmus) was played by the Players [...]." Whoever the players were, there is evidence that Shakespeare and his company were not among them: according to the royal Chamber accounts, dated 15 March 1595 – see Figure – he and the Lord Chamberlain's Men were performing for the Queen at Greenwich on Innocents Day. E.K. Chambers informs us that "the Court performances were always at night, beginning about 10 p.m. and ending at 1 a.m.", so their presence at both performances is highly unlikely; furthermore, the Gray's Inn Pension Book, which recorded all payments made by the Gray's Inn committee, exhibits no payment either to a dramatist or to professional company for this play. Baconians interpret this as a suggestion that, following precedent, The Comedy of Errors was both written and performed by members of the Inns of Court as part of their participation in the Gray's Inn celebrations. One problem with this argument is that the Gesta Grayorum refers to the players as "a Company of base and common fellows", which would apply well to a professional theatre company, but not to law students. But, given the jovial tone of the Gesta, and that the description occurred during a skit in which a "Sorcerer or Conjuror" was accused of causing "disorders with a play of errors or confusions", Baconians interpret it as merely a comic description of the Gray's Inn players.

Gray's Inn actually had a company of players during the revels. The Gray's Inn Pension Book records on 11 February 1595 that "one hyndred marks [£66.67] [are] to be layd out & bestowyd upon the gentlemen for their sports and shewes this Shrovetyde at the court before the Queens Majestie ...."

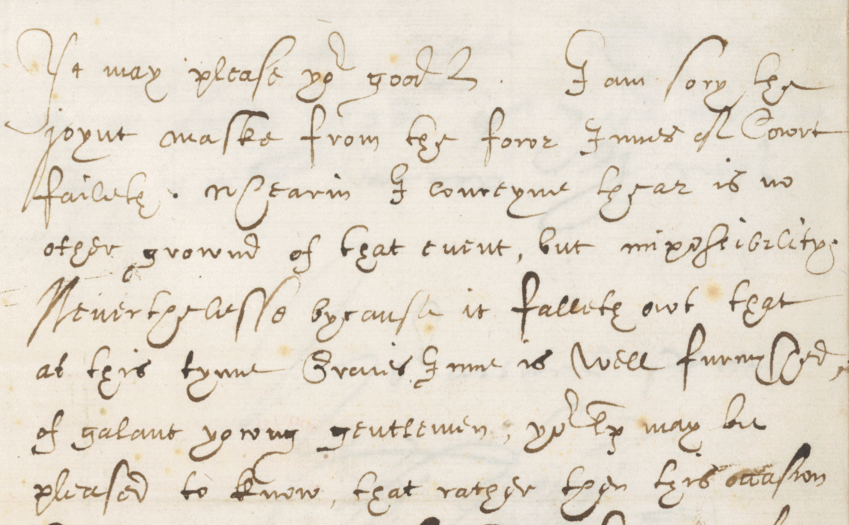
A letter written by Francis Bacon containing the words "I am sorry the joint masque from the four Inns of Court faileth". The letter may have been written either to Lord Burghley (before 1598) or Lord Somerset (1613).

There is, most importantly to the Baconians' argument, evidence that Bacon had control over the Gray's Inn players. In a letter either to Lord Burghley, dated before 1598, or to the Earl of Somerset in 1613, he writes "I am sorry the joint masque from the four Inns of Court faileth [.... T]here are a dozen gentlemen of Gray's Inn that will be ready to furnish a masque". Bacon contributed to the production of The Masque of Flowers. The dedication to a masque by Francis Beaumont performed at Whitehall in 1613 describes Bacon as the "chief contriver" of its performances at Gray's Inn and the Inner Temple. He also appears to have been their treasurer prior to the 1594–95 revels.

The discrepancy surrounding the whereabouts of the Chamberlain's Men is normally explained by theatre historians as an error in the Chamber Accounts. W. W. Greg suggested the following explanation:

"[T]he accounts of the Treasurer of the Chamber show payments to this company [the Chamberlain's Men] for performances before the Court on both 26 Dec. and 1 Jan. These accounts, however, also show a payment to the Lord Admiral's men in respect of 28 Dec. It is true that instances of two court performances on one night do occur elsewhere, but in view of the double difficulty involved, it is perhaps best to assume that in the Treasurer's accounts, 28 Dec. is an error for 27 Dec."

== Verbal parallels ==
=== Gesta Grayorum ===
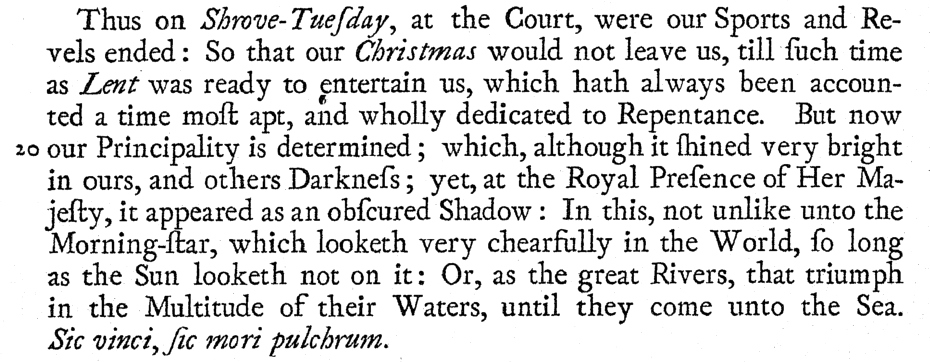
'Greater lessens the smaller' figure from Gesta Grayorum.

The final paragraph of the Gesta Grayorum – see Figure – uses a "greater lessens the smaller" construction that occurs in an exchange from the Merchant of Venice (1594–97), 5.1.92–97:

Ner. When the moon shone we did not see the candle
Por. So doth the greater glory dim the less,

A substitute shines brightly as a King
Until a King be by, and then his state
Empties itself, as doth an inland brooke
Into the main of waters ...

The Merchant of Venice uses both the same theme as the Gesta Grayorum (see Figure) and the same three examples to illustrate it – a subject obscured by royalty, a small light overpowered by that of a heavenly body and a river diluted on reaching the sea. In an essay from 1603, Bacon makes further use of two of these examples: "The second condition [of perfect mixture] is that the greater draws the less. So we see that when two lights do meet, the greater doth darken and drown the less. And when a small river runs into a greater, it loseth both the name and stream." A figure similar to "loseth both the name and stream" occurs in Hamlet (1600–01), 3.1.87–88:

Hamlet. With this regard their currents turn awry

And lose the name of action.

Bacon was usually careful to cite his sources but does not mention Shakespeare once in any of his work. Baconians claim, furthermore, that, if the Gesta Grayorum was circulated prior to its publication in 1688 – and no one seems to know if it was – it was probably only among members of the Inns of Court.

=== Promus ===
In the 19th century, a waste book entitled the Promus of Formularies and Elegancies was discovered. It contained 1,655 handwritten proverbs, metaphors, aphorisms, salutations and other miscellany. Although some entries appear original, a number of them are drawn from the Latin and Greek writers Seneca, Horace, Virgil, Ovid; John Heywood's Proverbes (1562); Michel de Montaigne's Essays (1575), and various other French, Italian and Spanish sources. A section at the end aside, the writing was, by Sir Edward Maunde-Thompson's reckoning, in Bacon's hand; indeed, his signature appears on folio 115 verso. Only two folios of the notebook were dated, the third sheet 5 December 1594 and the 32nd 27 January 1595 (1596). Bacon supporters found similarities between a great number of specific phrases and aphorisms from the plays and those written by Bacon in the Promus. In 1883 Mrs. Henry Pott edited Bacon's Promus and found 4,400 parallels of thought or expression between Shakespeare and Bacon.

Parallel 1
Parolles. So I say both of Galen and Paracelsus (1603–05 All's Well That Ends Well, 2.3.11)
Galens compositions not Paracelsus separations (Promus, folio 84, verso)
Parallel 2
Launce. Then may I set the world on wheels, when she can spin for her living (1589–93, The Two Gentlemen of Verona, 3.1.307–08)
Now toe on her distaff then she can spynne/The world runs on wheels (Promus, folio 96, verso)
Parallel 3
Hostesse. O, that right should o'rcome might. Well of sufferance, comes ease (1598, Henry IV, Part 2, 5.4.24–25)
Might overcomes right/Of sufferance cometh ease (Promus, folio 103, recto)

The orthodox view is that these were commonplace phrases; Baconians claim the occurrence in the last two examples of two ideas from the same Promus folio in the same Shakespeare speech is unlikely.

=== Published work ===
There is an example in Troilus and Cressida (2.2.163) which shows that Bacon and Shakespeare shared the same interpretation of an Aristotelian view:

Hector. Paris and Troilus, you have both said well,
And on the cause and question now in hand
Have glozed, but superficially: not much
Unlike young men, whom Aristotle thought
Unfit to hear moral philosophy:
The reasons you allege do more conduce
To the hot passion of distemper'd blood

Bacon's similar take reads thus: "Is not the opinion of Aristotle very wise and worthy to be regarded, 'that young men are no fit auditors of moral philosophy', because the boiling heat of their affections is not yet settled, nor tempered with time and experience?"

What Aristotle actually said was slightly different: "Hence a young man is not a proper hearer of lectures on political science; [...] and further since he tends to follow his passions his study will be vain and unprofitable [...]." The added coincidence of heat and passion and the replacement of "political science" with "moral philosophy" is employed by both Shakespeare and Bacon. However, Shakespeare's play precedes Bacon's publication, allowing the possibility of the latter borrowing from the former.

== Arguments against Baconian theory ==
Mainstream academics reject the Baconian theory (along with other "alternative authorship" theories), citing a range of evidence – not least of all its reliance on a conspiracy theory. As far back as 1879, a New York Herald scribe bemoaned the waste of "considerable blank ammunition [...] in this ridiculous war between the Baconians and the Shakespearians", while Richard Garnett made the common objection that Bacon was far too busy with his own work to have had time to create the entire canon of another writer too, declaring that "Baconians talk as if Bacon had nothing to do but to write his play at his chambers and send it to his factotum, Shakespeare, at the other end of the town."

Horace Howard Furness wrote in a letter that "Donnelly's theory about Bacon's authorship is too foolish to be seriously answered. I don't think he started it for any other purpose than notoriety. I believe he doesn't attempt to show that Bacon corrected the proof-sheets of the First Folio, and no human foresight could have told how the printed line would run, and have so regulated the MSS. To Donnelly's theory the pagination & the number of lines in a page are essential."

Mainstream academics reject the anti-Stratfordian claim that Shakespeare had not the education to write the plays. Shakespeare grew up in a family of some importance in Stratford; his father John Shakespeare, one of the wealthiest men in Stratford, was an Alderman and later High Bailiff of the corporation. It would be surprising had he not attended the local grammar school, as such institutions were founded to educate boys of Shakespeare's moderately well-to-do standing.

Stratfordian scholars also cite Occam's razor, the principle that the simplest and best-evidenced explanation (in this case that the plays were written by Shakespeare of Stratford) is most likely to be the correct one. A critique of all alternative authorship theories may be found in Samuel Schoenbaum's Shakespeare's Lives. Questioning Bacon's ability as a poet, Sidney Lee asserted: "[...] such authentic examples of Bacon's efforts to write verse as survive prove beyond all possibility of contradiction that, great as he was as a prose writer and a philosopher, he was incapable of penning any of the poetry assigned to Shakespeare."

At least one Stratfordian scholar claims Bacon privately disavowed the idea he was a poet, and, seen in the context of Bacon's philosophy, the "concealed poet" is something other than a dramatic or narrative poet. A mainstream historian of authorship doubt, Frank Wadsworth, asserted that the "essential pattern of the Baconian argument" consisted of "expressed dissatisfaction with the number of historical records of Shakespeare's career, followed by the substitution of a wealth of imaginative conjectures in their place."

In his 1971 essay "Bill and I", the author and scientific historian Isaac Asimov made the case that Bacon did not write Shakespeare's plays because certain portions of the Shakespeare canon show a misunderstanding of the prevailing scientific beliefs of the time that Bacon, one of the most intensely educated people of his time, would not have possessed. Asimov cites an excerpt from the last act of The Merchant of Venice, as well as the following excerpt from A Midsummer Night's Dream:

...The rude sea grew civil at her song,
And certain stars shot madly from their spheres,
to hear the sea maid's music. (Act 2, Scene 1, 152–154).

In the above example, the reference to stars shooting madly from their spheres was not in accordance with the then-accepted Greek astronomical belief that the stars all occupied the same sphere that surrounded the Earth as opposed to separate ones. While it was believed that additional ambient spheres existed, they were thought to contain the other bodies in the sky that move independently from the rest of the stars, i.e. the Sun, the Moon, and the planets that are visible to the naked eye (whose name makes its way into English from the Greek word planetes, meaning "wanderers", as in the wandering bodies that orbited the Earth independently from the fixed stars in their sphere).

== References in popular culture ==
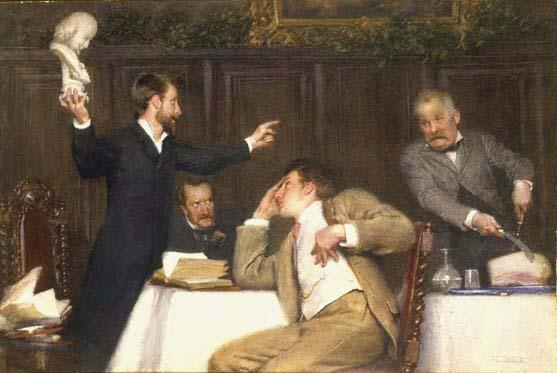
Shakespeare or Bacon (1885), a satirical painting about Baconian theory by Alfred Edward Emslie. An enthusiastic Shakespearean holds a bust of Shakespeare, apparently threatening the man at the right, who is carving bacon

Satirist Max Beerbohm published a cartoon entitled "William Shakespeare, his method of work", in his 1904 collection The Poet's Corner. Beerbohm depicts Shakespeare receiving the manuscript of Hamlet from Bacon. In Beerbohm's comic essay On Shakespeare's Birthday he declares himself to be unconvinced by Baconian theory, but wishes it were true because of the mischief it would cause – and because having one hero who was both an intellectual and a creative genius would be more exciting than two separate ones.

In Rudyard Kipling's 1926 short story "The Propagation of Knowledge" (later collected in Debits and Credits and The Complete Stalky & Co.), some schoolboys discover the Baconian theory and profess to be adherents, infuriating their English master.

J.C. Squire's "If It Had Been Discovered in 1930 that Bacon Really Did Write Shakespeare", published in If It Had Happened Otherwise (1931), is a comic farce wherein cultural upheavals, acts of quick thinking in rebranding tourist attractions, and additions of new slang terms to the English language occur when someone finds a box containing 17th-century documents proving that the plays of Shakespeare were in fact written by Bacon.

In P. G. Wodehouse's 1928 story "The Reverent Wooing of Archibald", the dedicated "sock collector" Archibald Mulliner is told that Bacon wrote plays for Shakespeare. He remarks that it was "dashed decent of him", but suggests he may have done it only because he owed Shakespeare money. Archibald then listens to an elderly Baconian expounding an incomprehensible cipher theory. The narrator remarks that the speech was "unusually lucid and simple for a Baconian". Archibald nevertheless wishes he could escape by picking up a nearby battle-axe hanging on the wall and "dot this doddering old ruin one just above the imitation necklace".

In Caryl Brahms' and S. J. Simon's No Bed for Bacon, Bacon constantly intrudes on Shakespeare's rehearsals and lectures him on playwriting technique (with quotations from Bacon's actual works), until Shakespeare in exasperation asks "Master Bacon: do I write my plays, or do you?"

An episode of The New Adventures of Sherlock Holmes radio program (27 May 1946) starring Basil Rathbone and Nigel Bruce uses the Baconian Cipher to call attention to a case involving a dispute over authorship of Shakespeare's works.

NBC-TV Cartoon Peabody's Improbable History, Episode 49, 31 October 1961, Bacon accuses Shakespeare of stealing credit for Romeo and Juliet. Dialogue includes lines such as "Bacon, you'll fry for this!"

A couple of references were made in The Muppet Show. In the Juliet Prowse episode, Miss Piggy asks her partner in the "At the Dance" segment, "Do you prefer Shakespeare to Bacon?" Her partner replies "I prefer anything to bacon." In the Panel Discussion segment of the Florence Henderson episode, Kermit the Frog starts the discussion by asking "Is Shakespeare in fact Bacon?"; Piggy, comically mistaking the "Bacon" in question for the edible type, takes offence at the question. (Later in the same episode, Piggy paraphrases a line from Hamlet, which Kermit quips "Sounds more like Bacon. From a ham.")

The 1981 Cold War thriller The Amateur, written by Robert Littell, involves CIA agents using Bacon's biliteral cipher. In the course of the plot, Professor Lakos, a Baconian theorist and cipher expert played by Christopher Plummer, assists the hero to uncover the truth. Littell published a novelisation of the story in the same year.

In 1973 Margaret Barsi-Greene published the "autobiography" of Bacon expounding the "Prince Tudor" version of Baconian theory. In 1992 this was adapted as the play I, Prince Tudor, wrote Shakespeare by the dramatist Paula Fitzgerald. In 2005 Ross Jackson published Shaker of the Speare: The Francis Bacon Story, a novel also based on the Prince Tudor model.

Cartoonist Frank Cho claims to be a believer in Baconian authorship, and his comic strips such as Liberty Meadows occasionally have characters act as his mouthpiece for this matter.

In the 2011 video game Portal 2, the corrupted Fact Sphere in the boss level states the following: "William Shakespeare did not exist. His plays were masterminded by Francis Bacon who used a ouija board to enslave playwriting ghosts."

"The Adventures of Shake and Bake", an SCTV skit that first aired 23 April 1982, parodies the Shakespeare/Bacon theory and features Dave Thomas as Shakespeare and Rick Moranis as Bacon.

Poet John S. Hall wrote a satirical poem about the theory, recording and releasing it on the 1991 album Real Men.

In the 2016 video game The Witness, the Baconian theory is brought up as part of the "Eclipse lecture".

The Curse of Oak Island on The History Channel frequently references the theory that the manuscripts of William Shakespeare, as written by Francis Bacon, are buried in The Money Pit on Oak Island.

The Canadian radio and television comedy duo of Wayne and Shuster often spoofed Shakespeare's plays. One of their best-known skits, "Rinse the Blood Off My Toga", begins with the statement "This play is presented with apologies to William Shakespeare, and Sir Francis Bacon, just in case."

== See also ==
- Jacques Duchaussoy, author of Bacon, Shakespeare ou Saint-Germain (1962), a non-fiction book that discussed the possibility of Francis Bacon ghost writing for Shakespeare and Miguel de Cervantes.
- Petter Amundsens' theory in the documentary Cracking the Shakespeare Code.
- Ashton, Susanna. "Who Brings Home the Bacon? Shakespeare and Turn-of-the-Century American Authorship". American Periodicals, vol. 6, 1996, pp. 1–28.

== Bibliography ==
- Bacon, Delia (1857). The Philosophy of the Plays of Shakespeare Unfolded.
- Bacon, Francis (1640). Advancement of Learning.
- Bacon, Francis (2002). The Major Works. Oxford University Press.
- Bland, Desmond (1968). Gesta Grayorum [The deeds of the Grays] (in Latin). Liverpool University Press.
- Boswell, James. The Life of Samuel Johnson 1740–1795.
- Caldecott, Harry Stratford (1895). Our English Homer; or, the Bacon-Shakespeare Controversy. Johannesburg Times.
- Chambers, Edmund Kerchever (1945). The Elizabethan Stage. Vol. 1. Clarendon Press.
- Dean, Leonard (1972). "Sir Francis Bacon's theory of civil history writing". In Vickers, Brian (ed.). Essential Articles for the Study of Sir Francis Bacon. Sidwick & Jackson.
- Dobson, Michael; Wells, Stanley (2005). The Oxford Companion to Shakespeare. Oxford University Press.
- Feil, J.P. (1967). "Bacon-Shakespeare: The Tobie Matthew Postscript". Shakespeare Quarterly. 18 (1). Folger Shakespeare Library: 73–76. doi:10.2307/2868068. JSTOR 2868068.
- Fletcher, Reginald, ed. (1901). The Gray's Inn Pension Book 1569–1669. Vol. 1.
- Friedman, William; Friedman, Elizebeth (1957). The Shakespearean Ciphers Examined. Cambridge University Press.
- Garnett, Richard; Gossel, Edmund (1904). English Literature: An Illustrated Record. Vol. II. London: Heinemann.
- Gibson, H. N. (2005). The Shakespeare Claimants: A Critical Survey of the Four Principal Theories Concerning the Authorship of the Shakespearean Plays. Psychology Press. ISBN 978-0-415-35290-1.
- Heminge, John; Condell, Henry (1623). First Folio.
- Holinshed, Raphael (1587). The Chronicles of England, Scotland and Ireland.
- Hollenbach, Karl F. (2013). Francis Rosicross.
- Jonson, Ben (1889). Timber: or, Discoveries; Made Upon Men and Matter. Cassell.
- Hall, Joseph (1597–1598). Virgidemarium (in Latin).
- Jardine, Lisa; Stewart, Alan (1999). Hostage to Fortune: The Troubled Life of Sir Francis Bacon. Hill and Wang.
- Kermode, F., ed. (1958). The Tempest'. Arden Shakespeare. London: Methuen.
- Lambeth Palace MS 650.28
- Lambeth Palace MS 976, folio 4
- Leary, Penn (1990). The Second Cryptographic Shakespeare. Westchester House.
- Marston, John (1598). The Metamorphosis of Pygmalion's Image And Certaine Satyres.
- Lang, Andrew (2008). Shakespeare Bacon and the Great Unknown. BiblioBazaar. ISBN 978-0-554-21918-9.
- Michell, John (1996). Who Wrote Shakespeare?. Thames and Hudson. ISBN 978-0-500-01700-5.
- Morgan, Appleton (1888). The Shakespearean Myth: William Shakespeare and Circumstantial Evidence. R. Clarke.
- New York Herald. 19 September 1879.
- Pott, Constance (1891). "Francis Bacon and His Secret Society". Baconiana: Journal of the Bacon Society. London: Sampson, Low and Marston.
- Pott, Henry; Pott, Constance Mary Fearon (1893). Did Francis Bacon Write "Shakespeare"?. R. Banks & Son.
- Public Record Office, Exchequer, Pipe Office, Declared Accounts, E. 351/542, f.107v
- Purchas, Samuel (1625). Hakluytus posthumus; or, Purchas his pilgrimes. London: William Stansby.
- Ramsbotham, Richard (2004). Who Wrote Bacon? William Shakespeare, Francis Bacon and James I, a Mystery of the Twenty-first Century. Temple Lodge Press. ISBN 9781902636542.
- Shelly, Percy Bysse (1821). Defense of Poetry.
- Smith, William Henry (1857). Bacon and Shakespeare: An Inquiry Touching Players, Playhouses, and Play-writers in the Days of Elizabeth. John Russell Smith.
- Smith, William Henry (1856). "Was Lord Bacon the author of Shakespeare's plays?". Letter to Egerton, Francis. William Skeffington.
- Spedding, James (1872). "Of the Interpretation of Nature". Life and Letters of Francis Bacon.
- Spedding, James (1872). The Works of Francis Bacon.
- Stronach, George (1904), Mr. Sidney Lee and the Baconians: A Critic Criticised (1st ed.), London: Gay and Bird, Wikidata Q20749426 – via Wikisource
- Stopes, C. (2003). The Bacon Shakespeare Question 1888. Kessinger Publishing. ISBN 978-0-7661-4252-7.
- Vaughan, V.M.; Vaughan, A.T. (1999). "The Tempest". Arden Shakespeare. Thomson Learning.
- Baldwin, William; Ferrers, George; Chaloner, Sir Thomas (1559). A Mirror for Magistrates.
- Velz, John W (2000). "Shakespeare's Ovid in the Twentieth Century: a Critical Survey". In Taylor, Albert Booth (ed.). Shakespeare's Ovid: the Metamorphoses in the Plays and Poems. Cambridge University Press. pp. 181–97. ISBN 978-0-521-77192-4.
- Willinsky, John (1994). Empire of Words: the Reign of the OED. Princeton University Press. ISBN 978-0-691-03719-6.
- Wigston, W.F.C. (1890). Bacon, Shakespeare and the Rosicrucians.
- Wigston, W.F.C. (1890). Hermes Stella or Notes and Jottings Upon the Bacon Cipher. London: G. Redway.
- Wright, Louis B. (1904). A Voyage to Virginia 1609. University Press of Virginia.
- Wright, Louis B. (2002). The Cultural Life of the American Colonies. Courier Dover Publications.
