= Herménégilde =

Herménégilde is a French masculine given name. Notable people with the name include:

- Herménégilde Boulay (1861–1942), Canadian politician
- Herménégilde Chiasson (born 1946), Canadian poet
- Herménégilde Duchaussoy (1854–1934), French meteorologist
