= The Great Mare =

Giant mare in Renaissance works

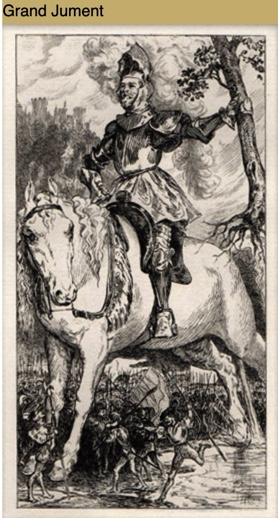

Creature information
- Other name(s): Grant Jument, Grand'jument
- Grouping: Gigantic white mare
- Sub grouping: Bayard
- Folklore: Folklore, Horse

Origin
- Country: Traditional French oral stories
- Region: France

The Great Mare (la Grand Mare, grant jument or grand'jument in French) was a gigantic mare that was ridden by giants in several Renaissance works. Stemming from medieval traditions inspired by Celtic mythology, she first appeared in The Grand and Priceless Chronicles of the Great and Enormous Giant Gargantua, written in 1532, in which Merlin created her from bones atop a mountain.

Rabelais was inspired by these Chronicles and built on the descriptions, meaning the mare Gargantua's mount in The Very Horrific Life of the Great Gargantua, Father of Pantagruel, which was published five years later. Incidents include the mare drowning her enemies with her urine and levelling all the trees of Beauce, transforming the region into a plain.

== Origin ==
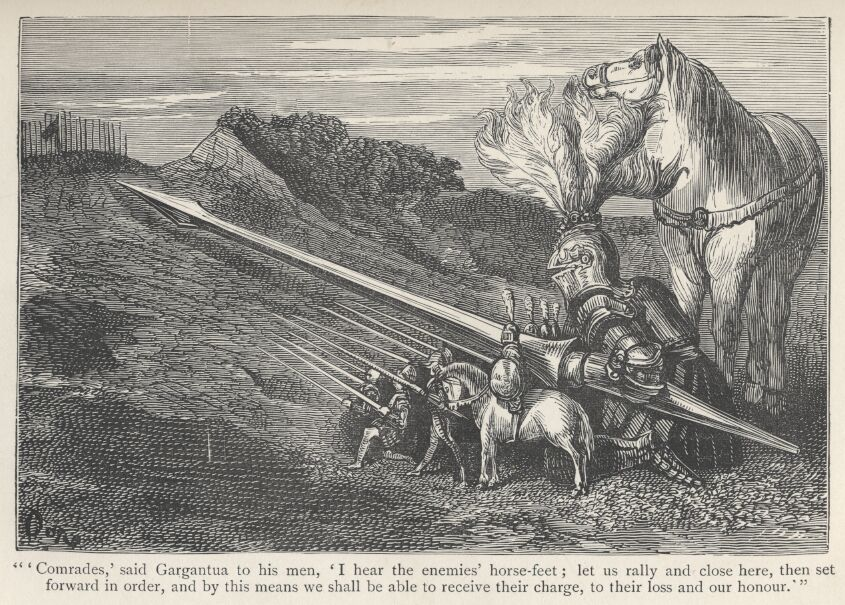
Gargantua's Great Mare on the right of this engraving by Gustave Doré.

As seen in two major Renaissance literary works, the Great Mare likely arose from popular traditional stories and ancient oral folklore. Many theories exist regarding her origin, with the majority of them having been put forth by Henri Dontenville.

According to him, the original Grand Mare had a white coat, a direct reference to the ancient established presence of the white horse in French folklore. She was ridden by a giant anguiped (a deity with a rooster's head and serpents for legs) in the oldest versions of her stories. The giant Gargantua is reminiscent of Gargan, a demiurge known by Celtic people. He was a builder and creator, of whom it is said marked out all of the pre-Christian pilgrimage routes and created chasms and mountains by stomping up and down on the earth. In addition to this, it is believed that he dug fords as he drank from streams and created rivers by urinating. According to Dontenville, the mare and its rider were mistakenly taken for a dragon, as is attested in the etymology of "G-R-G", a reference found in the names of the Giants of Rabelais (Grandgousier, Gargamelle and Gargantua). As a result of their similarities and histories, the Great Mare and Bayard's Mare share the same narrative folklore; that of a gigantic primitive dragon who transforms landscapes with her actions.

Another speculation of her origin is that the mare was the mount of the Gallic psychopomp goddess Epona. This Celtic origin was referenced by Henri Dontenville, who wrote that there are several gods accompanied by:

" ... a white horse or white mare..." who would gallop from the East to West, bringing to pass springtime each year and pulling the sun along with them. This symbolic motif is also used by Jacques Duchaussoy and classifies these creatures as a celestial being.

== Testimonials and place-names ==
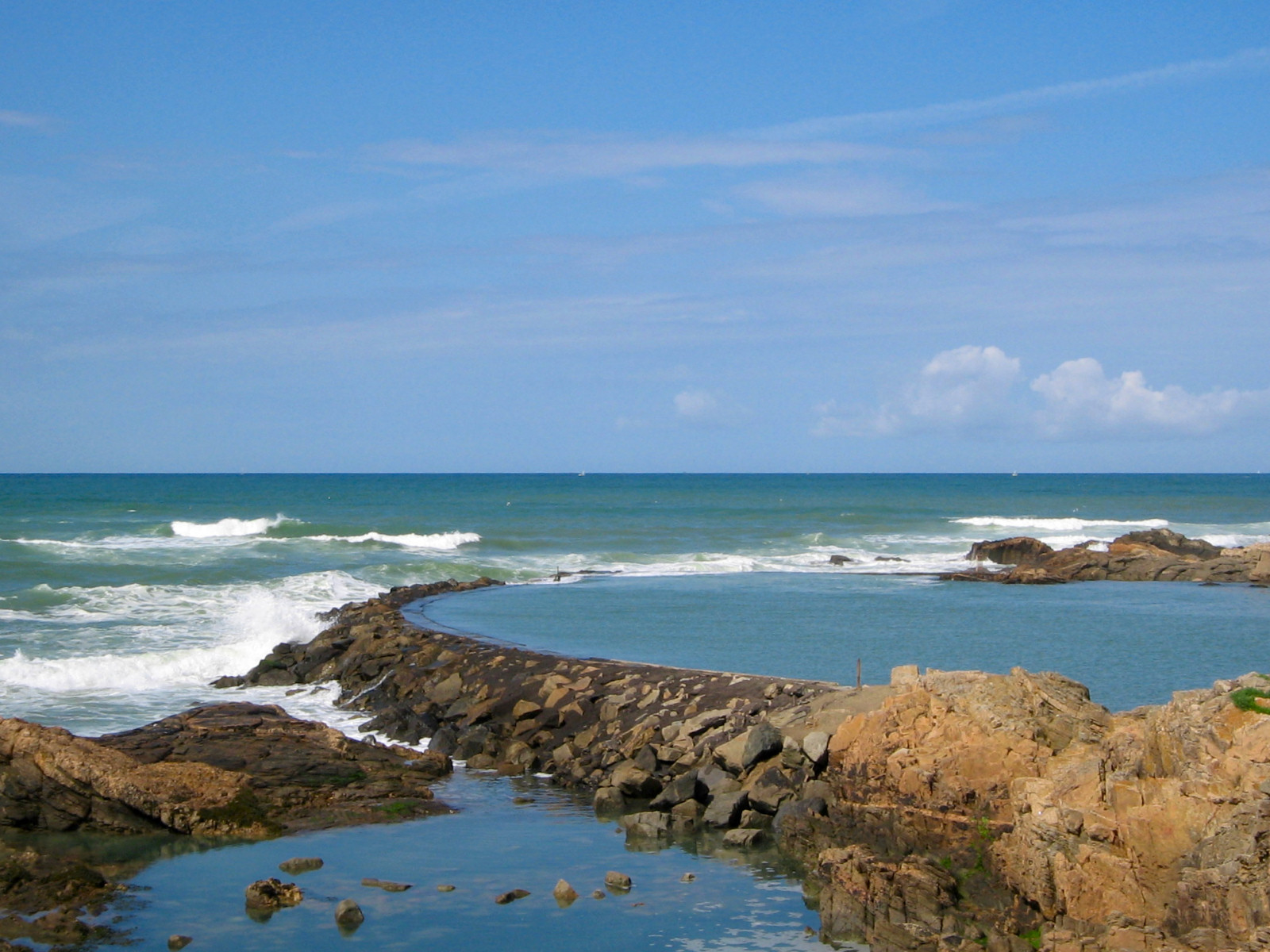
The Atlantic coast near Sables-d'Olonne, where there are several rocks that bear the names of horses and mares of myth.

The legend of "The Great Mare" and other similar tales of white horses are present in French beliefs and toponymes related to the west coast sea. On the banks of the Loire in Tours, there exists a White Horse Inn on the wharf of the Grand'Jument. A 25 by 25 meter granite monolith named "The Great Mare", exists in Montgothier, and was mined from 1800 to 1803 by Ernest Poulnln, a quarryman who also destroyed another block of granite in order to pay hommage to local legends.

In Paul Sébillot's collections of popular traditions it is written that the sea in Poitou is referred to as "the Great White Mare". The same name is used by fishermen in Vendée. In the 16th century, Noël du Fail described the sea as being "the great Margo mare, who is bridled by her tail". In addition to this, off the coast of Ouessant there exists La Jument lighthouse built on the Ar Gazec reef ("the mare" in Breton).

Bernard M. Henry, of the Friends of Rabelais and La Devinière Association, noted the existence of several boulders that had been named "The Horses", "The Mare" and "The Great Mare" in Sables-d'Olonne. He wrote that he believed the existence of these toponymes and the city they belonged to inspired Rabelais to write the arrival of the Great Mare. According to the French mythological society, this Great Mare made gigantic imprints that can still be seen in modern day, one within the Jura mountains, and the second in Normandie.

== Rabelais ==
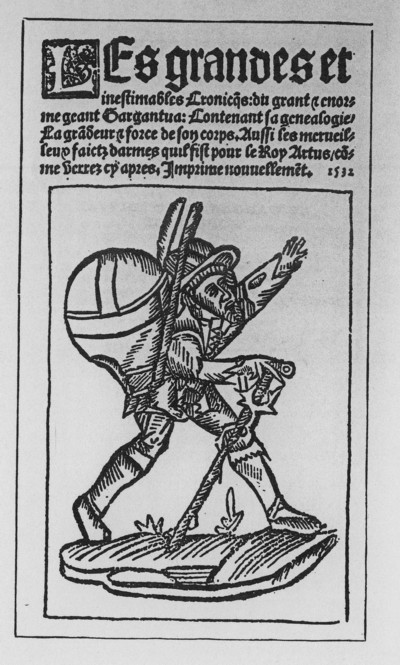
The Grand and Priceless Chronicles of the Great and Enormous Giant Gargantua 1532, frontispiece, unknown author.

The Great Mare made one of its most notable appearances in The Great and Priceless Chronicles of the Great and Enormous Giant Gargantua, an anonymous text that was, in older accounts, written in 1532. This is surmised as it contains references to France and Bretagne Matters.The writings report that Merlin was to advise King Arthur to be on guard against his enemies, and as Merlin left the king's court he decided to go to the Mont d'Orient to make the giants Grandgousier and Gallemelle from whale bones. After that, he created the Great Mare from the many bones of other mares,,. According to Bernard Sergen this theme of creating beings from bones could be a direct reference to a shamanic motif. Regardless, the Great Mare is undeniably a fae creature, because it was forged by Merlin, who had many connections to the fae.

The beast's purpose was to serve as a mount for giants. She was a great Flemish mare, one so powerful that

"...she carried them [Grandgousier et Gallemelle] as well as a 10 crown horse would carry a simple man..."

.

The mare belonged to Gallemelle and Grandgousier, the parents of Gargantua. When the young giant reached seven years old, his parents decided to present him to King Arthur. Upon their departure, Merlin told them, "...turn your mare's reins to the West, and let it go on and it will lead you well without fail...". The mare's tail then turned into a ax and following this, Gargantua then hung the bells of the Notre-Dame de Paris cathedaral around her neck. When the young giant entered King Arthur's service, the giant then left the mare in the forest of Bruyères-le-Châtel.

To this day, there still an often disputed point of whether or not Rabelais is the author of this particular text.

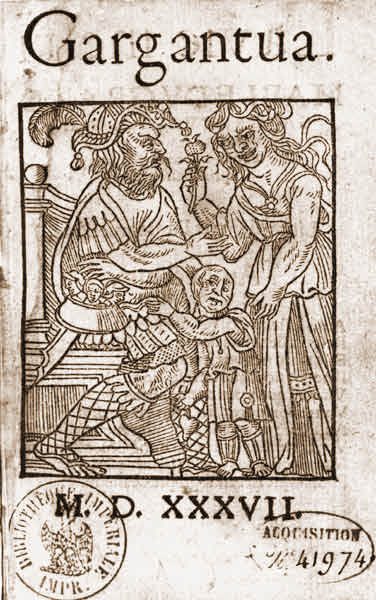
Frontispiece to François Rabelais's work, Gargantua, illustration by Denis de Harsy, 1537.

François Rabelais was largely inspired by the Grand Mare that was present in the Chronicles, and those inspirations added to the popular traditions of his time encouraged the creation of the Gargantua's giant mount in, The Very Horrific Life of the Great Gargantua, Father of Pantagruel and son of Grangousier (written in 1534), and its continuations. In these, he departs from the traditional fairy tales of that time, a genre that the Chronicles and the backstory of the mare's nature stem from. The Great Gargantua is a coming-of-age story and a parody of medieval tales of chevalry. In addition, in this story the Great Mare is given to the young giant by Grandgousier in order he might go to Paris to learn.

In Rabelais' text, Gargantua was trained from childhood in the equestrian arts by riding on artificial horses. The mare is mentioned for the first time in chapter XVI, in a scene which matches up almost verbatim to a passage from The Chronicles. This scene borrowed the concept of the flight of the Notre-Dame bells, which the giant hung around the neck of his mare (however, under Rabelais' pen script the passage takes on a new dimension by approaching the themes of culture, politics, morals, religion and aesthetics). The giant then left Paris on his mare to defend the country, and quickly encounted a troop of enemies. To defeat them, the mare drowned them in her urine.

In the aforementioned chapter XVI, the mare is given a tone in the fable that marks a break in the ambience of the story into a more popular and less academic burlesque. From that point it has a comedic function, and according to George Hoffman,

"...it opposes pedagogical or esoteric interpretation."

Rabelais sets aside supernatural elements, in a very distinct manner than The Chronicles or The Four Aymon Sons, in order for this chapter's background to evoke the concerns of peasants and city dwellers, and therefore emphasize the relationship between man and nature. Claude Gaignebet, in contrast, compares the Grand Mare to the Bayard horse of the Song of the Four Aymon Sons, saying that she is a magical creature that stemmed from popular folklore in connection with the alchemical and erudite tradition, as a result of her creator, Merlin.

Other ancient theories perceived the source of the Grand Mare's inspiration as possibly being Diane de Poitiers, nicknamed "The Great Seneschal" from Rabelais' time.

=== Description ===
Deemed "bigger and more monstrous than any mare we have ever seen", the Grand Mare was a gift from Africa sent by "Fayoles, Tetrarch King of Numidie". She was used solely as a means of transport for the giants. She herself was transported to Olone, in Thalmondoys, by four ships including three large Genoese sailing vessels, the "carracks". Her size was that of "six elephants", she had the hanging ears of a Languedoc goat, with her "feet split into fingers like Jules César's horse [...] and a small horn on the flank". Her coat was that of burnt chestnut dappled gray in some spots.

"...the ears thus hanging like the goats of Languegoth and a little horn on the rump. The rest was covered in a chestnut coat with crisscrossed grey."

La Grand Jument did not escape the parodic and humorous description that Rabelais was particularly fond of, especially in regard to her gigantism. Gargantua is able to make it to Paris in a few strides of the mare's gallop and then instantly finds his father, however it is the urine of the mare that makes the story especially comical. Indeed,

"...she proves her efficiency by the abundance of her urine..."

, however, even though Gargantua created Rhône by relieving himself, the long-term effects of the mare's relief are not detailed either in The Chronicles or in Rabelais:

"And from the story, that if his father's great mare had been there and pissed alike, that there had been a deluge larger than that of Deucalion: for she only pissed a river no bigger than the Rosne."

Her 200 fathom-tall tail was "like the Sainct Mars pile", a quadrangular tower located near Langeais. It dragged behind the mare, and divided into multiple branches.

The mare gives an impression of Africa at the time as being a "land of animality", and its powerful kicks do not refer, according to Guy Demerson, to a supernatural creature like seen in The Chronicles, but the animality of a simple monstrous creature. On the other hand, according George Hoffmann, this description is akin to "natural wonder" and calls for animal comparisons to support the "generative power of nature".

=== The Beauce Episode ===
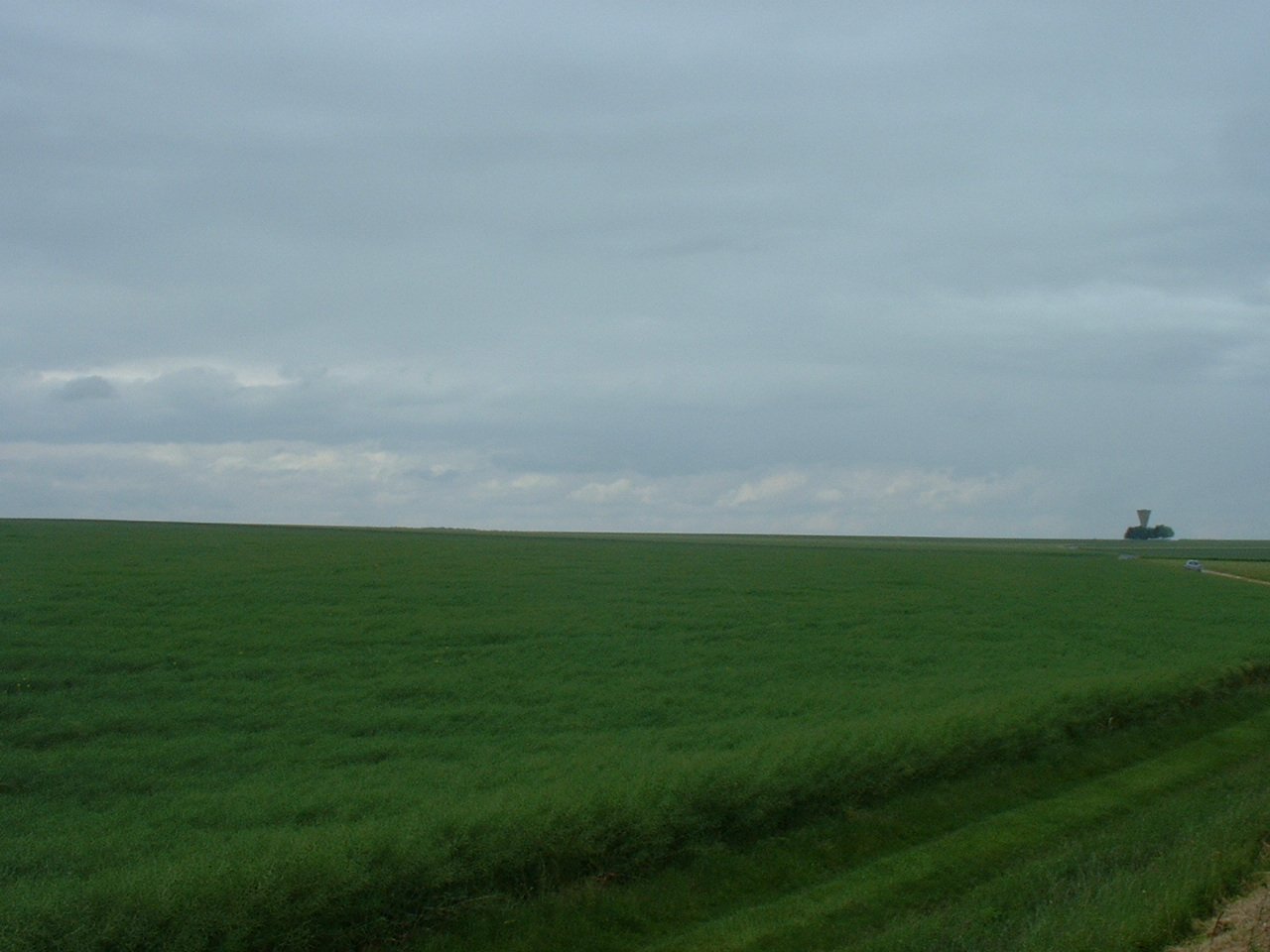
Typical landscape in Beauce : a cleared plain

As mentioned before, as soon Gargantua received the Grand Mare as a gift, he immediately decided to go to Paris. On his way, Gargantua passed through Beauce. At this point in the tale, Rabelais created a new whimsical etymology for this region inspired by the mare. This passage corresponds to a "hero's phase of development", which is "close to his big horse as he would be close to a small dog".

Beauce was covered in a vast forest during the time of this tale, measuring 35 leagues long and 17 leagues wide, infested with biting horse flies and hornets. As soon as she was on her way with her rider, the Grand Mare was stung by the pests and defended herself by whipping about her tail. She then bucked and kicked in every direction, leveling the entire forest to nothing. The desolation resulted in a vast countryside, of which Gargantua exclaimed : "I find this beautiful". Hence it is said that is how Beauce got its name,

Gargantua takes obvious joy from seeing the rampaging damage from his mount, but is careful not to expressly show the emotion, a reaction that is meant to give the reader the impression that he is an adolescent. At the end of its rampage, the mare proceeds to clear out the rest of the forest in a manner similar to that of the countryfolk of that time. Even though this episode gives a perspective of the forest being a place of hostility and the cleared countryside being one of great beauty, Beauce is famous for being monotonous and flat without many landmarks. In the tale and in real life, the topic of deforestation was at the center of tensions between the royal authority, the bourgeoisie and the countryfolk. This episode could also be a reflection of the fight against "illegal grazing" of cattle and horses in forested areas, specifically because Gargantua's mount is a clear representation of the aforementioned livestock that were prohibited from grazing in forests.

This episode is presented in The Chronicles with few discrepancies, as the destruction of the forests of Champagne actually precedes that of Beauce.

== Note ==
1. In Rabelais's work, Olone, en Thalmondoys is an imaginary port that would correspond to the port the Sables-d'Olonne, in Vendée, very active at the time of the author.
