= François Rabelais =

French writer and humanist (died 1553)

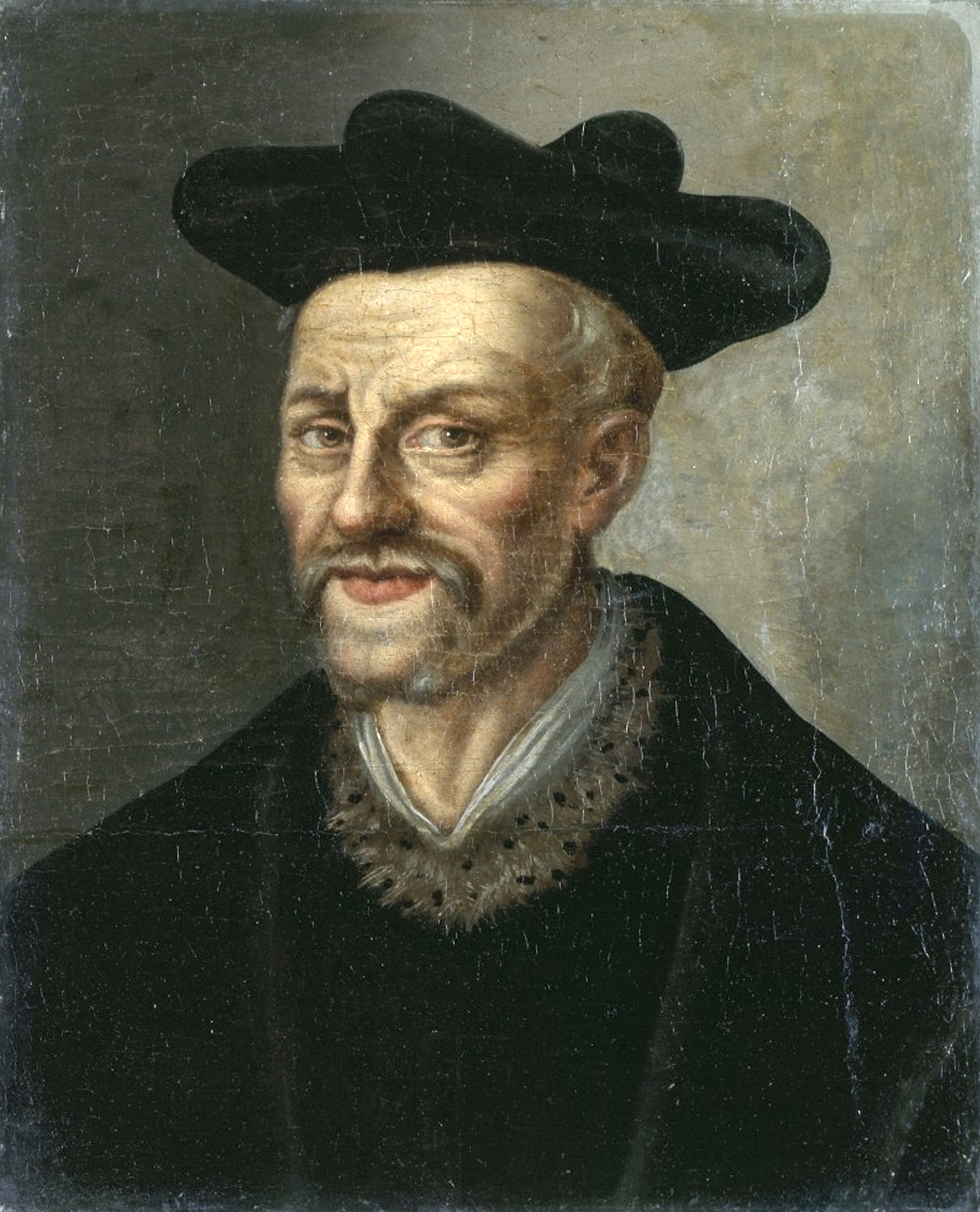
- Born: Between 1483 and 1494; Seuilly, Touraine, France
- Died: Between January and 14 March 1553; Paris, France
- Education: University of Poitiers; University of Montpellier
- Occupations: Writer, physician, humanist, Catholic priest
- Writing career
- Notable work: Gargantua and Pantagruel
- Movement: Renaissance humanism

François Rabelais (UK: /ˈræbəleɪ/, US: /ˌræbəˈleɪ/; French: [fʁɑ̃swa ʁablɛ]; born between 1483 and 1494; died 1553) was a French writer who has been called the first great French prose author. A humanist of the French Renaissance and Greek scholar, he attracted opposition from both Protestant theologian John Calvin and from the hierarchy of the Catholic Church. Though in his day he was best known as a physician, scholar, diplomat, and Catholic priest, later he became better known as a satirist for his depictions of the grotesque, and for his larger-than-life characters.

Living in the religious and political turmoil of the Reformation, Rabelais treated the great questions of his time in his novels. Rabelais admired Erasmus and like him is considered a Christian humanist. He was critical of medieval scholasticism and lampooned the abuses of powerful princes and popes.

Rabelais is widely known for the first two volumes relating the childhoods of the giants Gargantua and Pantagruel written in the style of bildungsroman; his later works—the Third Book (which prefigures the philosophical novel) and the Fourth Book are considerably more erudite in tone. His literary legacy gave rise to the word Rabelaisian, an adjective meaning "marked by gross robust humor, extravagance of caricature, or bold naturalism."

== Biography ==
=== Touraine countryside to monastic life ===
According to a tradition dating back to Roger de Gaignières (1642–1715), François Rabelais was the son of seneschal and lawyer Antoine Rabelais and was born at the estate of La Devinière in Seuilly (near Chinon), Touraine in modern-day Indre-et-Loire, where a Rabelais museum can be found today. The exact dates of his birth (c. 1483–1494) and death (1553) are unknown, but most scholars accept his likely birthdate as being 1483. (Note: In 1905, Abel Lefranc proposed 1494 as his year of birth based on the fact that the fictional giant Gargantua was born on a Shrove Tuesday taking place around 3 February. In a letter Rabelais wrote to Guillaume Budé around 1520, he calls himself an adulescens, a Latin term applying to a young man under thirty, but scholars note this may well be a mark of modesty when addressing an elder humanist. Researchers agree more on 1483, due to a copy of his epitaph indicating his death on April 9, 1553 at the age of 70. The discovery of a notarial document relating to Rabelais' estate dated March 14, 1553 has led scholars to surmise that he was already dead by this date. A third hypothesis put forward by Claude Bougreau deduces from a study of the chapter 39 of the Third Book that he was born on May 5, 1489.) His education was likely typical of the late medieval period: beginning with the trivium syllabus that included the study of grammar, rhetoric, and dialectic before moving on to the quadrivium, which dealt with arithmetic, geometry, music, and astronomy.

In 1623, Jacques Bruneau de Tartifume wrote that Rabelais began his life as a novice of the Franciscan Order of Cordeliers, at the Convent of the Cordeliers, near Angers; however there is no direct evidence to support this theory. By 1520, he was at Fontenay-le-Comte in Poitou where he became friends with Pierre Lamy, a fellow Franciscan, and corresponded with Guillaume Budé, who observed that he was already competent in law. Following Erasmus' commentary on the original Greek version of the Gospel of Luke, the Sorbonne banned the study of Greek in 1523, believing that it encouraged "personal interpretation" of the New Testament. As a result, both Lamy and Rabelais had their Greek books confiscated. Frustrated by the ban, Rabelais petitioned Pope Clement VII (1523–1534) and obtained an indult with the help of Bishop Geoffroy d'Estissac, and was able to leave the Franciscans for the Benedictine Order at Maillezais. At the Saint-Pierre-de-Maillezais abbey, he worked as a secretary to the bishop—a well-read prelate appointed by Francis I—and enjoyed his protection.

=== Physician and author ===
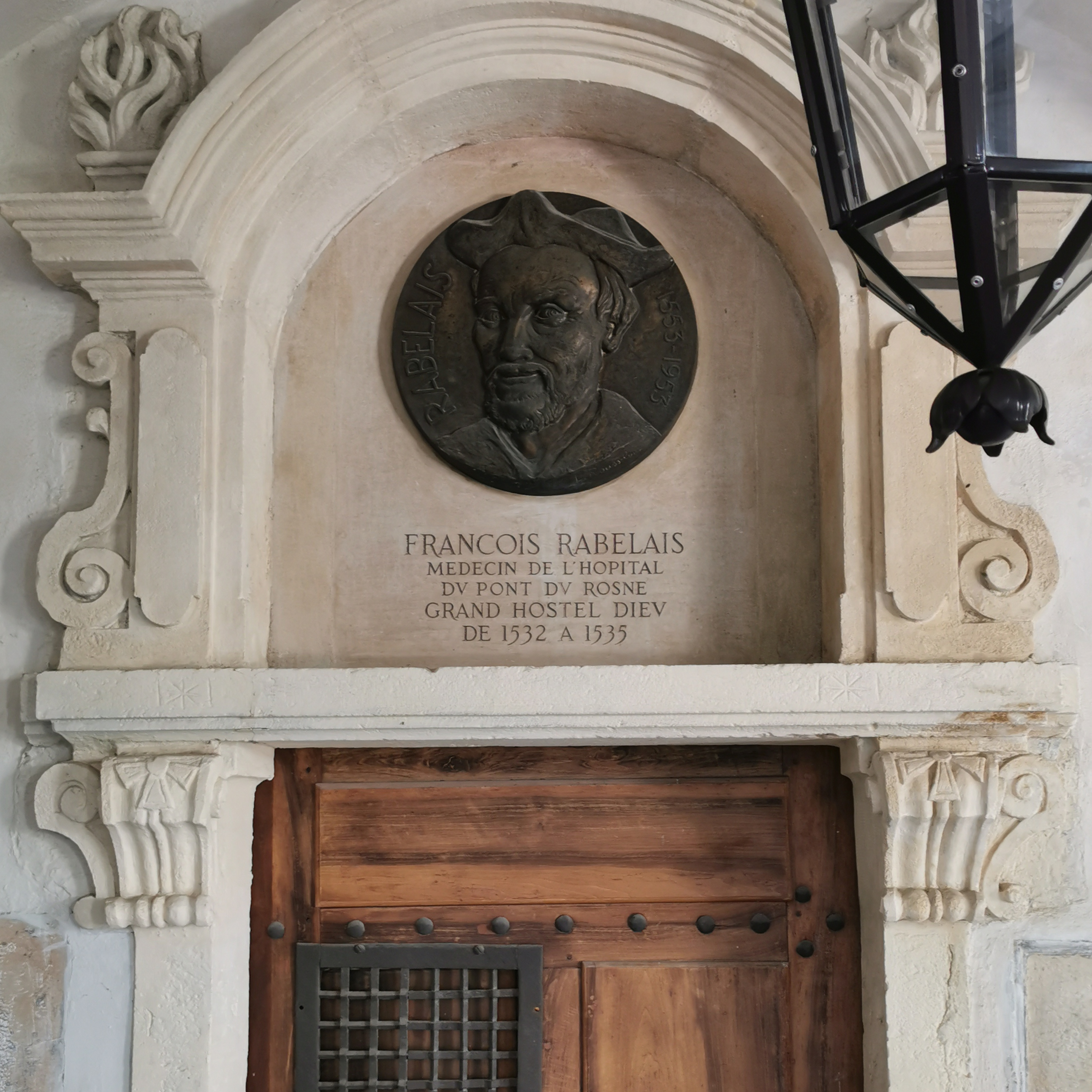
Rabelais worked at the hospital Hôtel-Dieu de Lyon from 1532 to 1535.

Around 1527 he left the monastery without authorization, becoming an apostate until Pope Paul III absolved him of this crime, which carried with it the risk of severe sanctions, in 1536. Until this time, church law forbade him to work as a doctor or surgeon. J. Lesellier surmises that it was during the time he spent in Paris from 1528 to 1530 that two of his three children (François and Junie) were born. After Paris, Rabelais went to the University of Poitiers and then to the University of Montpellier to study medicine. In 1532 he moved to Lyon, one of the intellectual centres of the Renaissance, and began working as a doctor at the hospital Hôtel-Dieu de Lyon. During his time in Lyon, he edited Latin works for the printer Sebastian Gryphius, and wrote a famous admiring letter to Erasmus to accompany the transmission of a Greek manuscript from the printer. Gryphius published Rabelais' translations and annotations of Hippocrates, Galen and Giovanni Manardo. In 1537 he returned to Montpellier to pay the fees to obtain his licence to practice medicine (April 3) and obtained his doctorate the following month (May 22). Upon his return to Lyon in the summer, he gave an anatomy lesson at Lyon's Hôtel-Dieu using the corpse of a hanged man, which Etienne Dolet described in his Carmina. It was through his work and scholarship in the field of medicine that Rabelais gained European fame.

In 1532, under the pseudonym Alcofribas Nasier (an anagram of François Rabelais), he published his first book, Pantagruel King of the Dipsodes, the first of his Gargantua series, primarily to supplement his income at the hospital. The idea of basing an allegory on the lives of giants came to Rabelais from the folklore legend of les Grandes chroniques du grand et énorme géant Gargantua, which were sold by colporteurs and at the fairs of Lyon as popular literature in the form of inexpensive pamphlets. The first edition of an almanac parodying the astrological predictions of the time called Pantagrueline prognostications appeared for the year 1533 from the press of Rabelais' publisher François Juste. It contained the name "Maître Alcofribas" in its full title. The popular almanacs continued irregularly until the final 1542 edition, which was prepared for the "perpetual year". From 1537, they were printed at the end of Juste's editions of Pantagruel. Pantagruelism is an "eat, drink and be merry" philosophy, which led his books into disfavor with the theologians but brought them popular success and the admiration of later critics for their focus on the body. This first book, critical of the existing monastic and educational system, contains the first known occurrence in French of the words encyclopédie, caballe, progrès, and utopie, among others. The book became popular, along with its 1534 prequel, which dealt with the life and exploits of Pantagruel's father Gargantua, and which was more infused with the politics of the day and overtly favorable to the monarchy than the preceding volume had been. The 1534 re-edition of Pantagruel contains many orthographic, grammatical, and typographical innovations, in particular the use of diacritics (accents, apostrophes, and diaereses), which was then new in French. Mireille Huchon ascribes this innovation in part to the influence of Dante's De vulgari eloquentia on French letters.

=== Travel to Italy ===
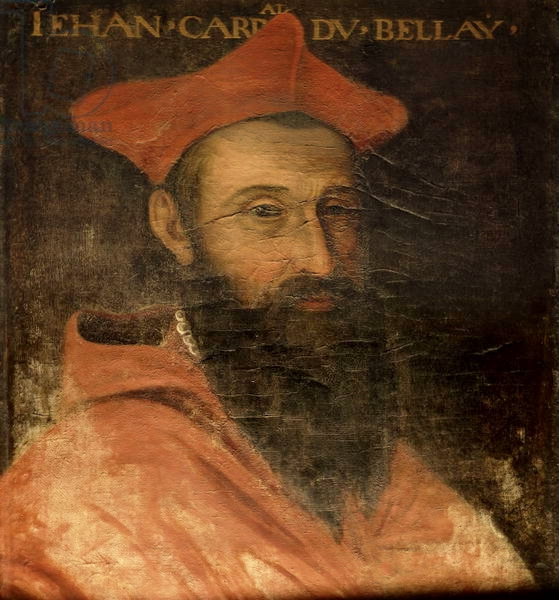
Rabelais' three trips to Rome were under the protection of Jean du Bellay.

No clear evidence establishes when Jean du Bellay and Rabelais met. Nevertheless, when du Bellay was sent to Rome in January 1534 to convince Pope Clément VII not to excommunicate Henry VIII, he was accompanied by Rabelais, who worked as his secretary and personal physician until his return in April. During his stay, Rabelais found the city fascinating and decided to bring out a new edition of Bartolomeo Marliani's Topographia antiqua Romae with Sebastien Gryphe in Lyon.

Rabelais quietly left the Hôtel Dieu de Lyon on 13 February 1535 after receiving his salary, disappearing until August 1535 as a result of the tumultuous Affair of the Placards, which led Francis I to issue an edict forbidding all printing in France. Only the influence of the du Bellays allowed the printing presses to run again. In May, Jean du Bellay was named cardinal, and still with a diplomatic mission for Francis I, had Rabelais join him in Rome. During this time, Rabelais was also working for Geoffroy d'Estissac's interests and maintained a correspondence with him through diplomatic channels (under royal seal as far as Poitiers). Three letters from Rabelais have survived. On 17 January 1536, Paul III issued a papal brief authorizing Rabelais to join a Benedictine monastery and practice medicine, as long as he refrained from surgery. Jean du Bellay having been named the abbot in commendam of the Saint-Maur Abbey, Rabelais arranged to be assigned there, knowing that the monks were to become secular clergy the following year.

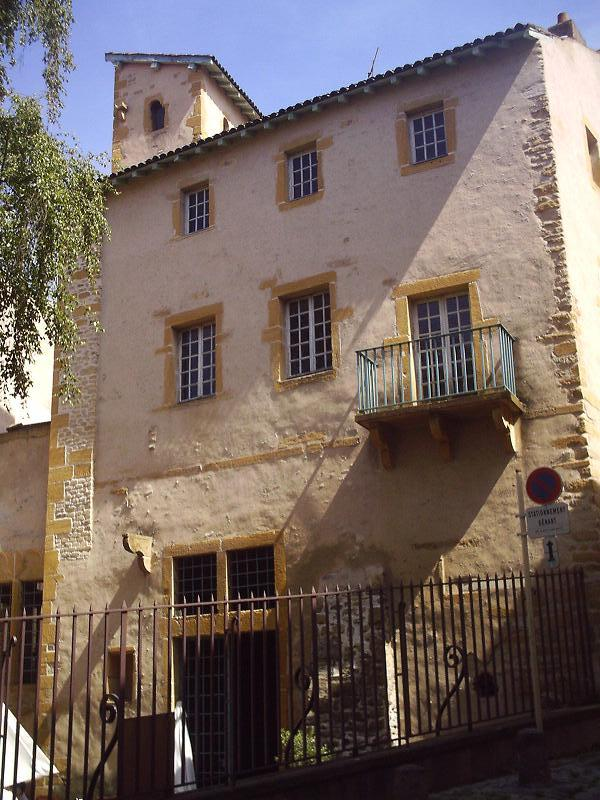
The house of François Rabelais in Metz

In 1540, Rabelais lived for a short time in Turin as part of the household of du Bellay's brother, Guillaume. It was at this time that his two children were legitimized by Paul III, the same year that his third child (Théodule) died in Lyon at the age of two. Rabelais also spent some time lying low, under periodic threat of being condemned of heresy depending upon the health of his various protectors. In 1543, both Gargantua and Pantagruel were condemned by the Sorbonne, then a theological college. Only the protection of du Bellay saved Rabelais after the condemnation of his novel by the Sorbonne. In June 1543 Rabelais became a Master of Requests. Between 1545 and 1547 François Rabelais lived in Metz, then a free imperial city and a republic, to escape the condemnation by the University of Paris. In 1547, he became curate of Saint-Christophe-du-Jambet in Maine and of Meudon near Paris.

With support from members of the prominent du Bellay family, Rabelais had received approval from King Francis I to continue to publish his collection on 19 September 1545 for six years. However, on 31 December 1546, the Tiers Livre joined the Sorbonne's list of banned books. After the king's death in 1547, the academic élite frowned upon Rabelais, and the Paris Parlement suspended the sale of The Fourth Book, published in 1552, despite Henry II having accorded him the royal privilege. This suspension proved ineffective, for the time being, as the king reiterated his support for the book.

Rabelais resigned from the curacy in January 1553 and died in Paris later that year. (Note: Traditionally, the death date of Rabelais has been given as 9 April 1553 but the discovery of a notarial document (concerning his brother) places Rabelais' death before 14 March 1553.)

== Novels ==
=== Gargantua and Pantagruel ===
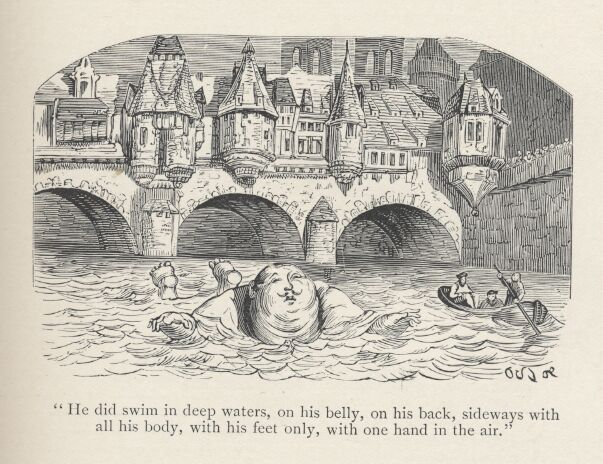
Illustration for Gargantua and Pantagruel by Gustave Doré

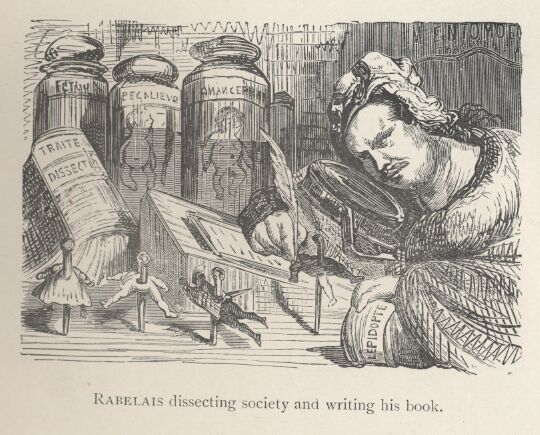
Illustration for Gargantua and Pantagruel by Gustave Doré

Gargantua and Pantagruel relates the adventures of Gargantua and his son Pantagruel. The tales are adventurous and erudite, festive and gross, ecumenical, and rarely—if ever—solemn for long. The first book, chronologically, was Pantagruel: King of the Dipsodes and the Gargantua mentioned in the Prologue refers not to Rabelais' own work but to storybooks that were being sold at the Lyon fairs in the early 1530s. In the first chapter of the earliest book, Pantagruel's lineage is listed back 60 generations to a giant named Chalbroth. The narrator dismisses the skeptics of the time—who would have thought a giant far too large for Noah's Ark—stating that Hurtaly (the giant reigning during the flood and a great fan of soup) simply rode the Ark like a kid on a rocking horse, or like a fat Swiss guy on a cannon.

In the Prologue to Gargantua the narrator addresses the: "Most illustrious drinkers, and you the most precious pox-ridden—for to you and you alone are my writings dedicated ..." before turning to Plato's Banquet. An unprecedented syphilis epidemic had raged through Europe for over 30 years when the book was published, even the king of France was reputed to have been infected. Etion was the first giant in Pantagruel's list of ancestors to suffer from the disease.

Although most chapters are humorous, wildly fantastic and frequently absurd, a few relatively serious passages have become famous for expressing humanistic ideals of the time. In particular, the chapters on Gargantua's boyhood and Gargantua's paternal letter to Pantagruel present a quite detailed vision of education.

==== Thélème ====
In the second novel, Gargantua, M. Alcofribas narrates the story of the Abbey of Thélème, built by the giant Gargantua. It differs markedly from the monastic norm, since it is open to both monks and nuns and has a swimming pool, maid service, and no clocks in sight. Only the good-looking are permitted to enter. The inscription at the gate first specifies who is not welcome: hypocrites, bigots, the pox-ridden, Goths, Magoths, straw-chewing law clerks, usurious grinches, old or officious judges, and burners of heretics. When the members are defined positively, the text becomes more inviting:

Honour, praise, distraction
Herein lies subtraction
in the tuning up of joy.
To healthy bodies so employed
Do pass on this reaction:
Honour, praise, distraction

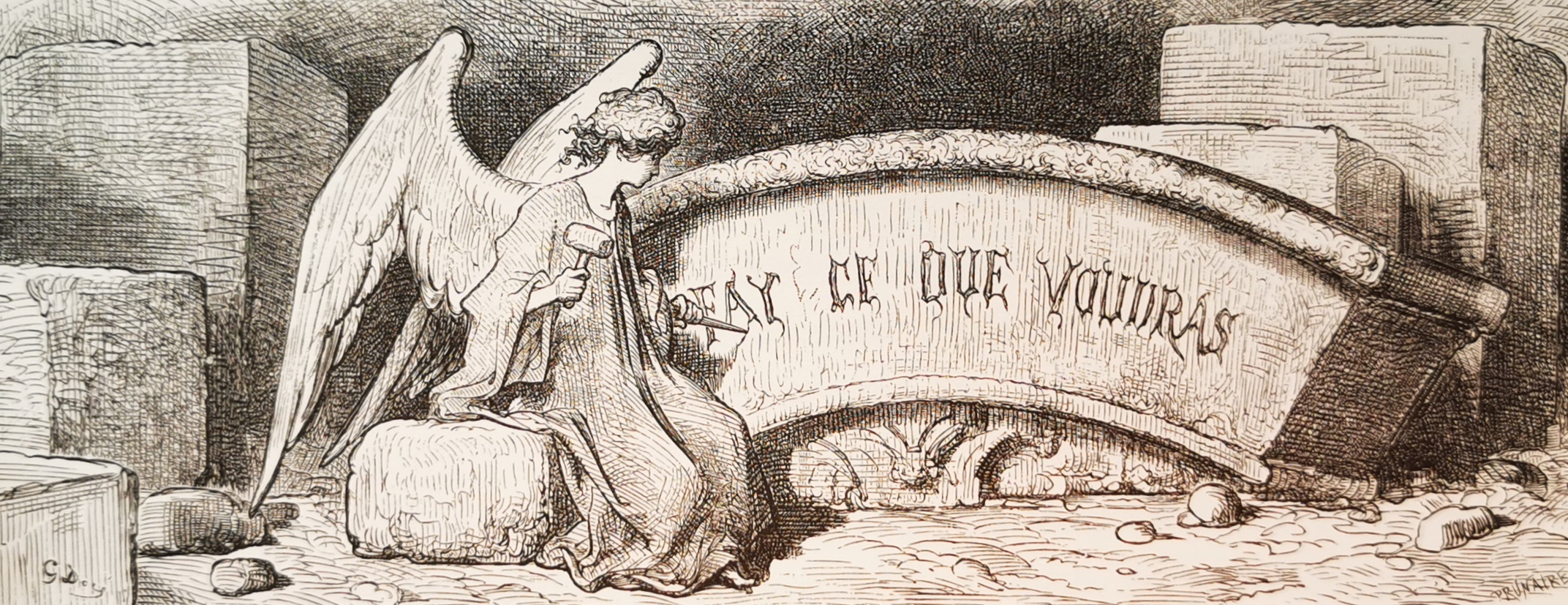
Inscription above the Abbey of Thélème (Gustave Doré)

The Thélèmites in the abbey live according to a single rule:

DO WHAT YOU WANT

=== The Third Book ===
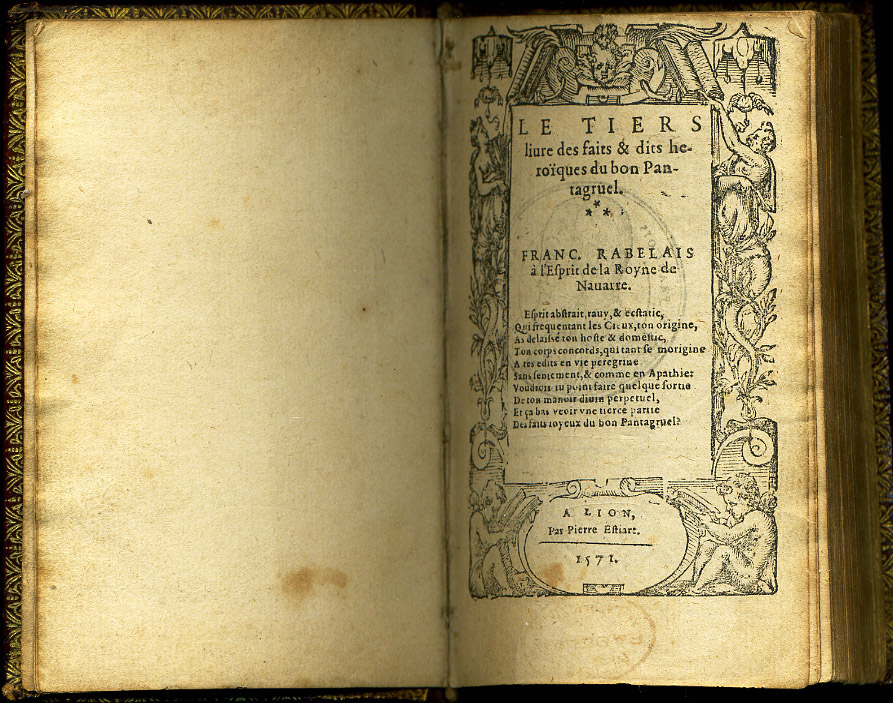
Titlepage of a 1571 edition containing the last three books of Pantagruel: Le Tiers Livre des Faits & Dits Heroïques du Bon Pantagruel (The Third Book of the True and Reputed Heroic Deeds of the Noble Pantagruel)

Published in 1546 under his own name with the privilège granted by Francis I for the first edition and by Henri II for the 1552 edition, The Third Book was condemned by the Sorbonne, like the previous tomes. In it, Rabelais revisited discussions he had had while working as a secretary to Geoffroy d'Estissac earlier in Fontenay-le-Comte, where la querelle des femmes had been a lively subject of debate. More recent exchanges with Marguerite de Navarre—possibly about the question of clandestine marriage and the Book of Tobit whose canonical status was being debated at the Council of Trent—led Rabelais to dedicate the book to her before she wrote the Heptaméron.

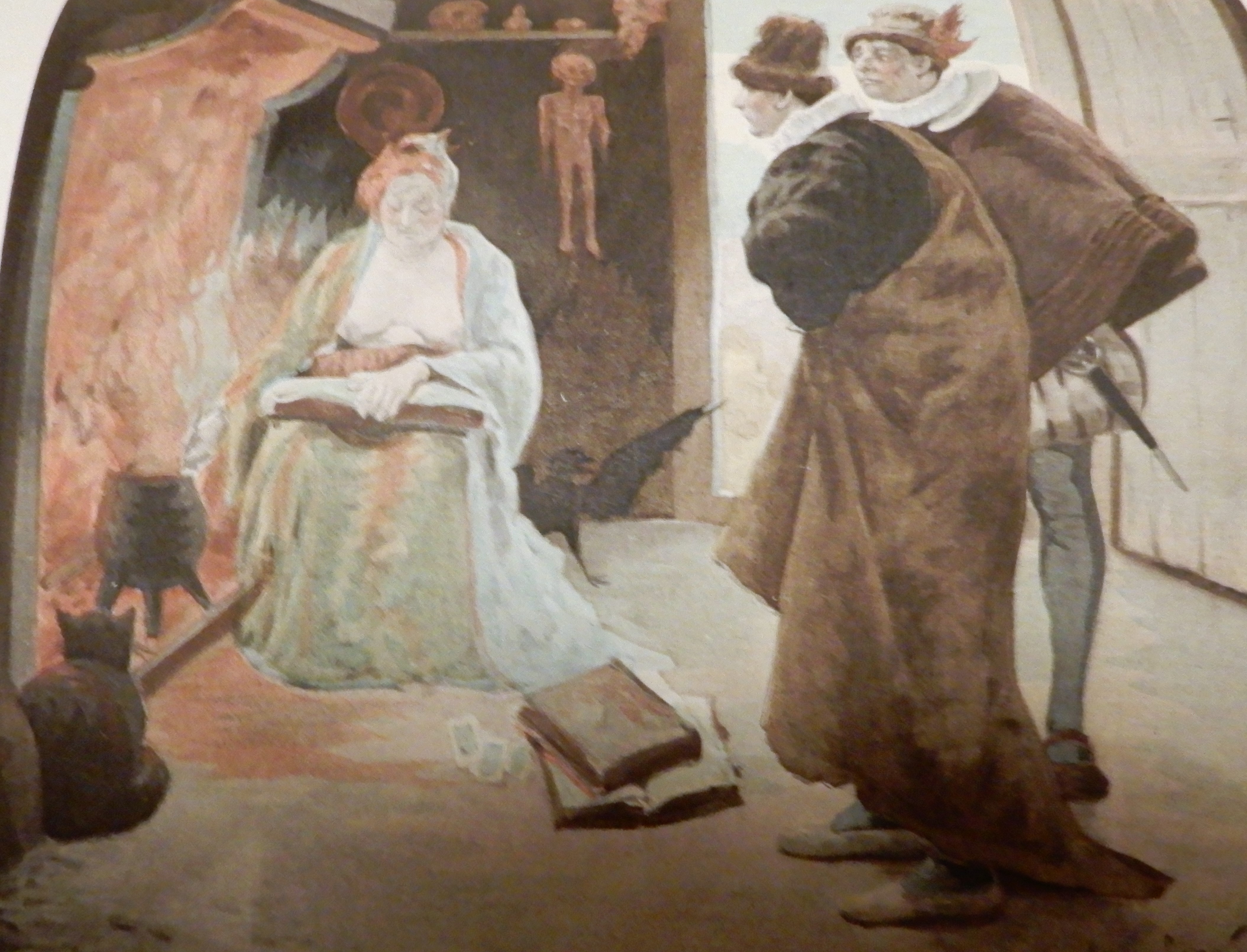
Sybyl of Panzoust

In contrast to the two preceding chronicles, the dialogue between the characters is much more developed than the plot elements in the third book. In particular, the central question of the book, which Panurge and Pantagruel consider from multiple points of view, is an abstract one: whether Panurge should marry or not. Torn between the desire for a wife and the fear of being cuckolded, Panurge engages in divinatory methods, like dream interpretation and bibliomancy. He consults authorities vested with revealed knowledge, like the sibyl of Panzoust or the mute Nazdecabre, profane acquaintances, like the theologian Hippothadée or the philosopher Trouillogan, and even the jester Triboulet. It is likely that several of the characters refer to real people: Abel Lefranc argues that Hippothadée was Jacques Lefèvre d'Étaples, Rondibilis was the doctor Guillaume Rondelet, the esoteric Her Trippa corresponds to Cornelius Agrippa. One of the comic features of the story is the contradictory interpretations Pantagruel and Panurge get embroiled in, the first of which being the paradoxical encomium of debts in chapter III. The Third Book, deeply indebted to In Praise of Folly, contains the first-known attestation of the word paradoxe in French.

The more reflective tone shows the characters' evolution from the earlier tomes. Here Panurge is not as crafty as Pantagruel and is stubborn in his will to turn every sign to his advantage, refusing to listen to advice he had himself sought out. For example, when Her Trippa reads dark omens in his future marriage, Panurge accuses him of the same blind self-love (philautie) from which he seems to suffer. His erudition is more often put to work for pedantry than let to settle into wisdom. By contrast, Pantagruel's speech gains in weightiness by the third book, the exuberance of the young giant having faded.

At the end of the Third Book, the protagonists decide to set sail in search of a discussion with the Oracle of the Divine Bottle. The last chapters are focused on the praise of Pantagruelion, which combines properties of linen and hemp—a plant used in the 16th century for both the hangman's rope and medicinal purposes, being copiously loaded onto the ships. As a naturalist inspired by Pliny the Elder and Charles Estienne, the narrator intercedes in the story, first describing the plant in great detail, then waxing lyrical on its various qualities.

=== The Fourth Book ===
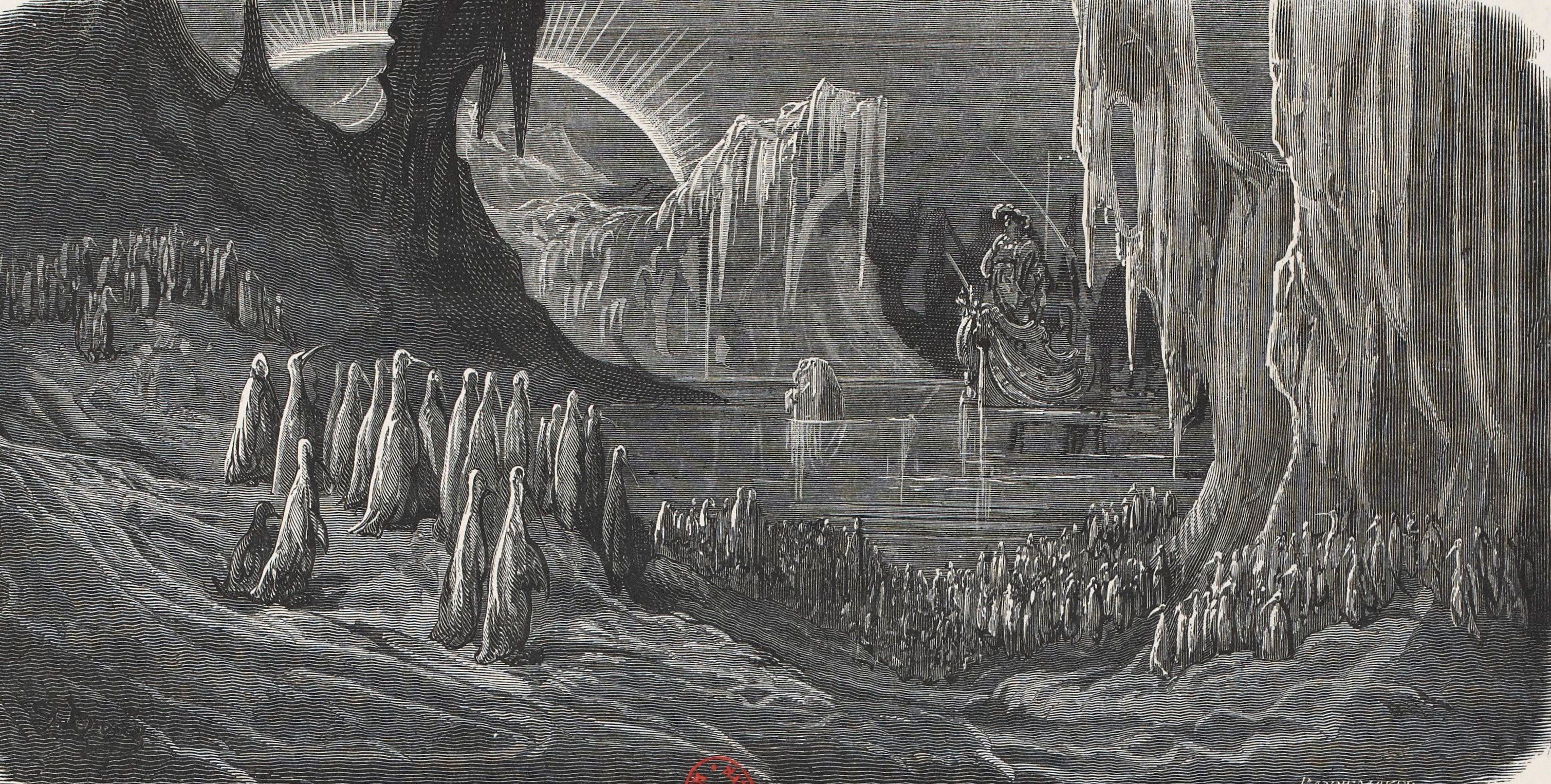
Gustave Doré's illustration of the Frozen Words episode (Chapter 56)

Rabelais began work on The Fourth Book while still in Metz. He dropped off a manuscript containing eleven chapters and ending mid-sentence in Lyon on his way to Rome to work as Cardinal du Bellay's personal physician in 1548. According to Jean Plattard, this publication served two purposes: first, it brought Rabelais some much-needed money; and second, it allowed him to respond to those who considered his work blasphemous. While the prologue denounced slanderers, the following chapters did not raise any polemical issues. Already it contained some of the best-known episodes, including the storm at sea and Panurge's sheep. It was framed as an erratic odyssey, inspired in part by the Argonauts and the news of Jacques Cartier's voyage to Canada, and in part by the imaginary voyage described by Lucian in A True Story, which provided Rabelais not only with several anecdotes, but also with a first-person narrator who regularly insisted on the veracity of obviously fantastical elements of the story. The full version appeared in 1552, after Rabelais received a royal privilege on 6 Aug 1550 for the exclusive right to publish his work in French, Tuscan, Greek, and Latin. This, he accomplished with the help of the young Cardinal of Châtillon (Odet de Coligny)—who would later convert to Protestantism and be excommunicated. Rabelais thanked the Cardinal for his help in the prefatory letter signed 28 January 1552 and, for the first time in the Pantagruel series, titled the prologue in his own name rather than using a pseudonym.

== Use of language ==
The French Renaissance was a time of linguistic contact and debate. The first book of French, rather than Latin, grammar was published in 1530, followed nine years later by the language's first dictionary. Spelling was far less codified. Rabelais, as an educated reader of the day, preferred etymological spelling—preserving clues to the lineage of words—to more phonetic spellings which wash those traces away.

Rabelais' use of Latin, Greek, regional and dialectal terms, creative calquing, gloss, neologism and mis-translation was the fruit of the printing press having been invented less than a hundred years earlier. A doctor by trade, Rabelais was a prolific reader, who wrote a great deal about bodies and all they excrete or ingest. His fictional works are filled with multilingual, often sexual, puns, absurd creatures, bawdy songs and lists. Words and metaphors from Rabelais abound in modern French and some words have found their way into English, through Thomas Urquhart's unfinished 1693 translation, completed and considerably augmented by Peter Anthony Motteux by 1708. According to Radio-Canada, the novel Gargantua permanently added more than 800 words to the French language.

== Scholarly views ==
Most scholars today agree that Rabelais wrote from a perspective of Christian humanism. This has not always been the case. Abel Lefranc, in his 1922 introduction to Pantagruel, depicted Rabelais as a militant anti-Christian atheist. On the contrary, M. A. Screech, like Lucien Febvre before him, describes Rabelais as an Erasmian. While formally a Roman Catholic, Rabelais was a humanist, and favoured classical Antiquity over the "barbarous" Middle Ages, believing in the need for reform to return science and arts to their classical blossoming, and theology and the Church to their original Evangelical form as expressed in the Gospels. In particular, he was critical of monasticism. Rabelais criticised what he considered to be inauthentic Christian positions by both Catholics and Protestants, and was attacked and portrayed as a threat to religion or even an atheist by both. For example, "at the request of Catholic theologians, all four Pantagrueline chronicles were censured by either the Sorbonne, Parlement, or both". On the opposite end of the spectrum, John Calvin saw Rabelais as a representative of the numerous moderate evangelical humanists who, while "critical of contemporary Catholic institutions, doctrines, and conduct", did not go far enough; in addition, Calvin considered Rabelais' apparent mocking tone to be especially dangerous, since it could be easily interpreted as a rejection of the sacred truths themselves.

Timothy Hampton writes that "to a degree unequaled by the case of any other writer from the European Renaissance, the reception of Rabelais's work has involved dispute, critical disagreement, and ... scholarly wrangling ..." In particular, as pointed out by Bruno Braunrot, the traditional view of Rabelais as a humanist has been challenged by early post-structuralist analyses denying a single consistent ideological message of his text, and to some extent earlier by Marxist critiques such as Mikhail Bakhtin with his emphasis on the subversive folk roots of Rabelais' humour in medieval "carnival" culture. At present, however, "whatever controversy still surrounds Rabelais studies can be found above all in the application of feminist theories to Rabelais criticism", as he is alternately considered a misogynist or a feminist based on different episodes in his works.

An article by Edwin M. Duvall in Études rabelaisiennes 18 (1985) sparked a debate on the prologue of Gargantua in the pages of the Revue d’histoire littéraire de la France as to whether Rabelais intentionally hid higher meanings in his work, to be discovered through erudition and philology, or if instead the polyvalence of symbols was a poetic device meant to resist the reductive gloss.

Michel Jeanneret suggests that Panurge's description (in the Papimane Island episode in The Fourth Book) of the ill-effects of the pages of decretals being used as toilet paper, targets, cones, and masks on whatever they touch was due to their misuse as material objects. As the merry crew sail on from the island towards the Divine Bottle, in the subsequent episode, Pantagruel is content simply listening to the thawing words as they rain down on the boat, whereas Jeanneret observes that his companions focus instead on their colourful appearance while they are still frozen, hurrying to gather as many up as they can and offering to sell those they have collected. The pilot describes the words as evidence of a great battle, and the narrator even wants to preserve some of the finest insults in oil. Jeanneret observes that Pantagruel considers the exchange of words to be an act of love rather than a commercial exchange, argues that their artificial preservation is superfluous, and "insinuates that books are petrified tombs, where the signs threaten to stop moving and, left to the devices of lazy readers, get shriveled down into simplistic meanings[,]" implying that "[a]ll writing carries within it the danger of the Decretals."

The Catholic Encyclopedia of 1911 declared that Rabelais was

... a revolutionary who attacked all the past, Scholasticism, the monks; his religion is scarcely more than that of a spiritually minded pagan. Less bold in political matters, he cared little for liberty; his ideal was a tyrant who loves peace. [...] His vocabulary is rich and picturesque, but licentious and filthy.[.....] As a whole it exercises a baneful influence.

== In literature ==
Acknowledging both the sordid side of the work and its protean nature, Jean de La Bruyère in 1688 saw beyond that its sublimity:

His book is an enigma, it is whatever you want to say, it is inexplicable, it is a chimera ….. a monstrous assembling of refined and ingenious morality and foul corruption. Either it is bad, sinking far below the worst, to have the charm of the rabble. Or it is good, rising as far as exquisite and excellent, to be perhaps the most delicious of dishes.

In his 1759–1767 novel Tristram Shandy, Laurence Sterne quotes extensively from Rabelais. Alfred Jarry performed, from memory, hymns of Rabelais at Symbolist Rachilde's Tuesday salons, and worked for years on an unfinished libretto for an opera by Claude Terrasse based on Pantagruel. Anatole France gave lectures on Rabelais in Argentina. John Cowper Powys, D. B. Wyndham-Lewis, and Lucien Febvre (one of the founders of the French historical school Annales), all wrote books about him.

James Joyce included an allusion to "Master Francois somebody" in his 1922 novel Ulysses. (Note: "those books he brings me the works of Master Francois somebody supposed to be a priest about a child born out of her ear because her bumgut fell out a nice word for any priest".)

Mikhail Bakhtin, a Russian philosopher and critic, derived his concepts of the carnivalesque and grotesque body from the world of Rabelais. He points to the historical loss of communal spirit after the Medieval period and speaks of carnival laughter as an "expression of social consciousness".

Aldous Huxley admired Rabelais' work. Writing in 1929, he praised Rabelais, stating "Rabelais loved the bowels which Swift so malignantly hated. His was the true amor fati : he accepted reality in its entirety, accepted with gratitude and delight this amazingly improbable world."

George Orwell was not an admirer of Rabelais. Writing in 1940, he called him "an exceptionally perverse, morbid writer, a case for psychoanalysis". Milan Kundera, in a 2007 article in The New Yorker, commented on a list of the most notable works of French literature, noting with surprise and indignation that Rabelais was placed behind Charles de Gaulle's war memoirs, and was denied the "aura of a founding figure! Yet in the eyes of nearly every great novelist of our time he is, along with Cervantes, the founder of an entire art, the art of the novel". In the satirical musical The Music Man by Meredith Willson, the names "Chaucer! Rabelais! Balzac!" are presented by local gossips as evidence that the town librarian "advocates dirty books."

Rabelais is a pivotal figure in Kenzaburō Ōe's 1994 acceptance speech for the Nobel Prize in Literature.

== Honours, tributes and legacy ==
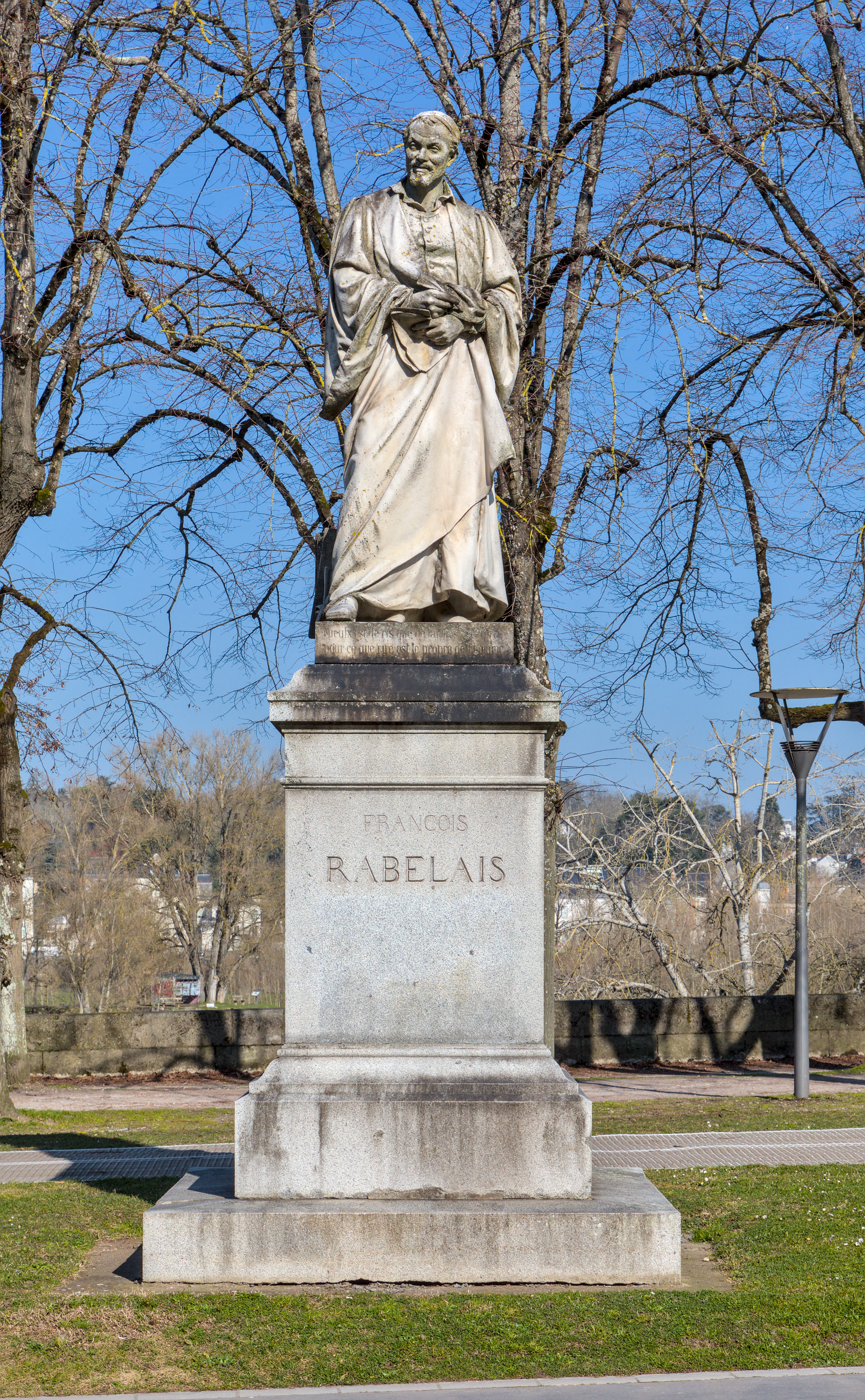
A statue of Rabelais next to the university of Tours.

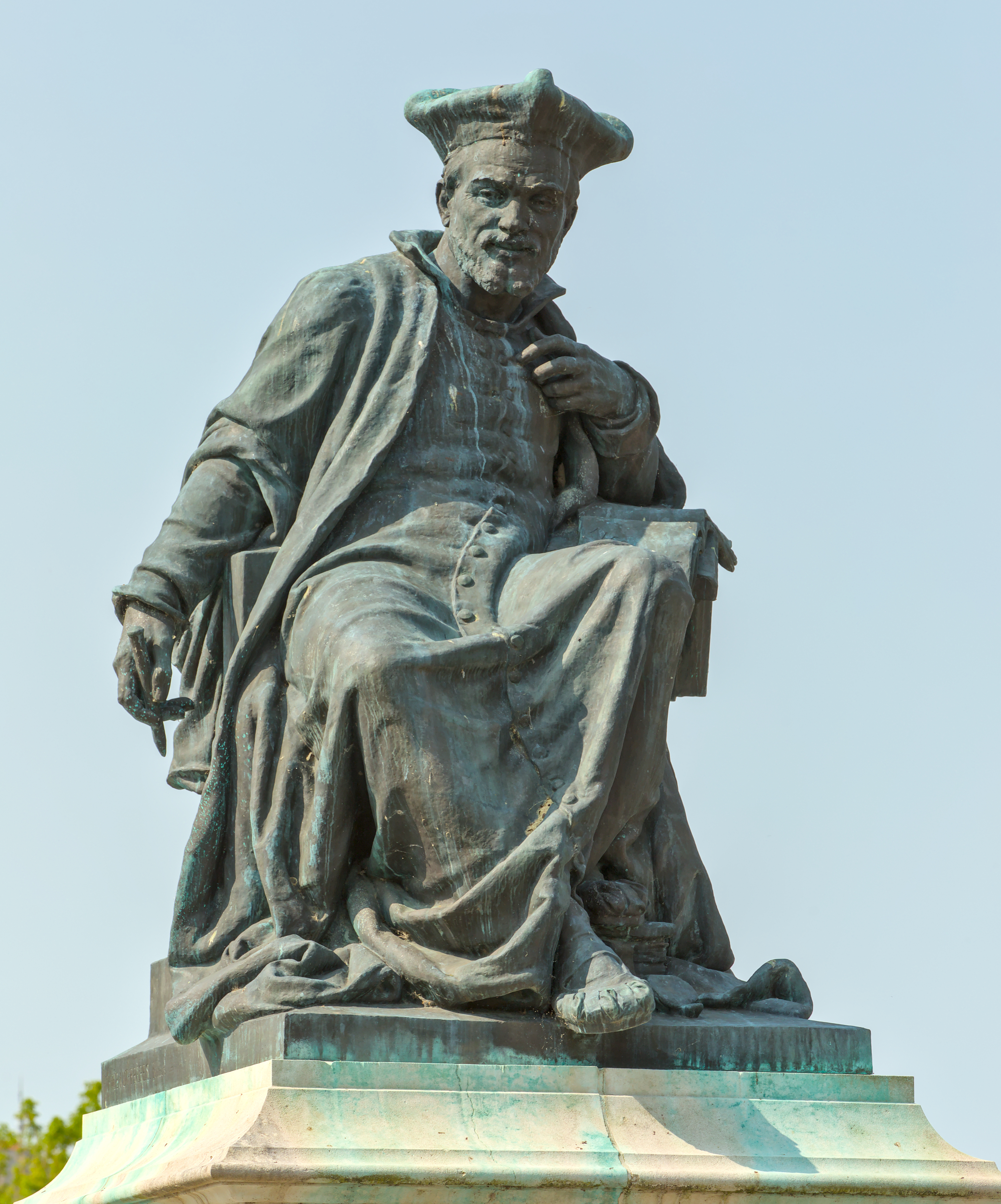
A statue of Rabelais in Chinon.

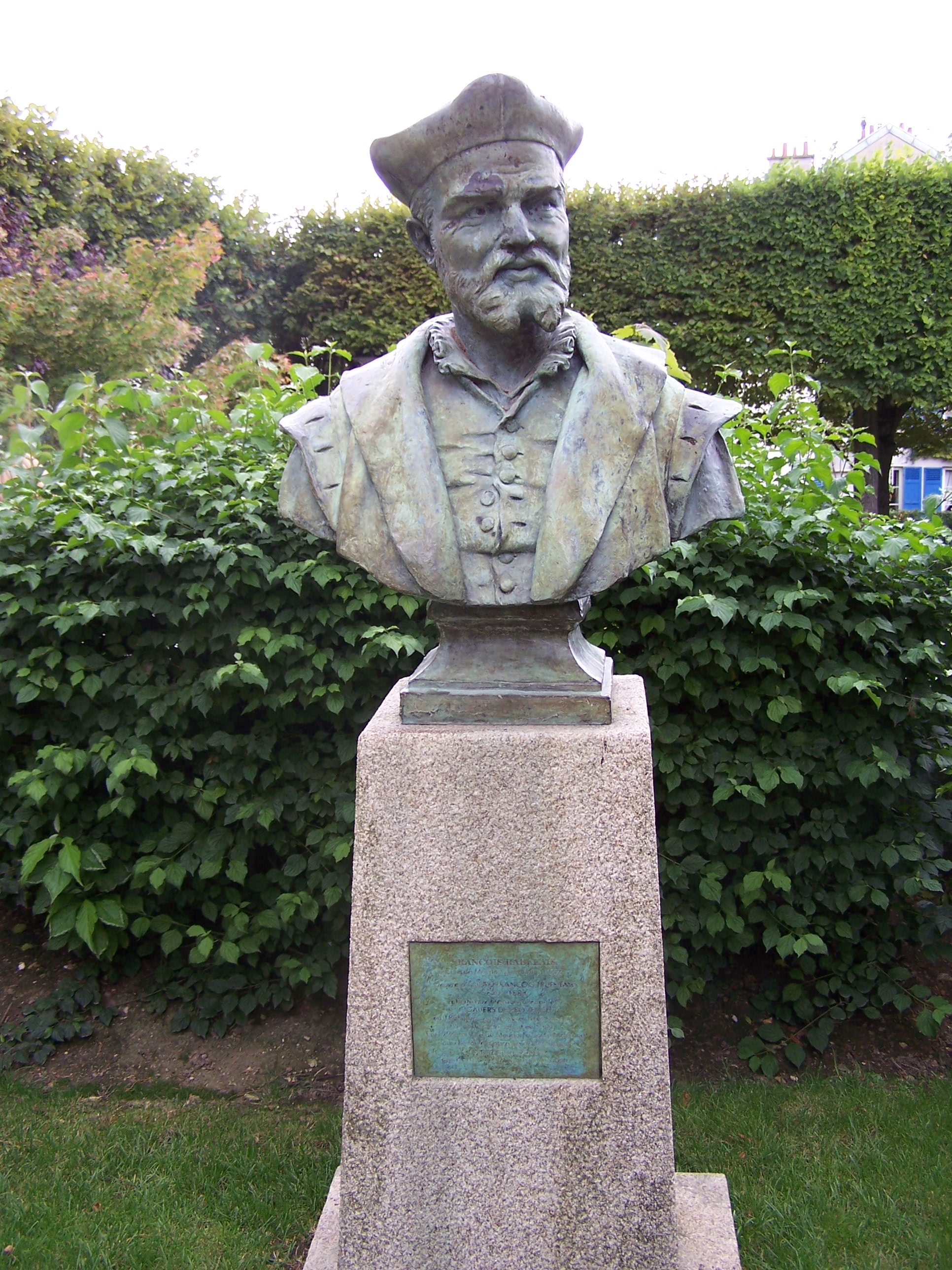
Bust of Rabelais in Meudon, where he served as Curé

- The public university in Tours, France, was named Université François Rabelais during 40 years, until 2018.
- Honoré de Balzac was inspired by the works of Rabelais to write Les Cent Contes Drolatiques (The Hundred Humorous Tales). Balzac also pays homage to Rabelais by quoting him in more than twenty novels and the short stories of La Comédie humaine (The Human Comedy). Michel Brix wrote of Balzac that he "is obviously a son or grandson of Rabelais... He has never hidden his admiration for the author of Gargantua, whom he cites in Le Cousin Pons as "the greatest mind of modern humanity". In his story of Zéro, Conte Fantastique published in La Silhouette on 3 October 1830, Balzac even adopted Rabelais's pseudonym (Alcofribas).
- There is a tradition at the University of Montpellier's Faculty of Medicine: no graduating medic can undergo a convocation without taking an oath under Rabelais's robe. Further tributes are paid to him in other traditions of the university, such as its faluche, a distinctive student headcap which in Montpellier is styled in his honour, with four bands of colour emanating from its centre.
- Asteroid '5666 Rabelais' was named in honor of François Rabelais in 1982.
- In Jean-Marie Gustave Le Clézio's 2008 Nobel Prize lecture, Le Clézio referred to Rabelais as "the greatest writer in the French language".
- In France the moment at a restaurant when the waiter presents the bill is still sometimes called le quart d'heure de Rabelais (The fifteen minutes of Rabelais), in memory of a famous trick Rabelais used to get out of paying a tavern bill.

== Works ==
- Gargantua and Pantagruel, a series of four or five books including:
  - Pantagruel (1532)
  - La vie très horrifique du grand Gargantua, usually called Gargantua (1534)
  - Gargantua and Pantagruel#The Third Book (1546)
  - The Fourth Book (1552)
  - The Fifth Book (1564) whose authorship is contested
- Pantagrueline Prognostication (1532, 1533, 1535, 1537, 1542 ): parodic almanac, astrology
- Sciomachie (1549): description of the festivities organized by Jean du Bellay to celebrate the birth of Louis of Valois

== See also ==
- Rabelais and His World
- Thomas Urquhart
- Peter Anthony Motteux, (works at wikisource)
- The Great Mare
- Rabelais Student Media
