= Stigma of print =

The stigma of print is the concept that an informal social convention restricted the literary works of aristocrats in the Tudor and Jacobean ages to private and courtly audiences — as opposed to commercial endeavours — at the risk of social disgrace if violated, and which obliged the author to profess an abhorrence of the press and to restrict his works from publication. The stigma is usually confined to creative literature rather than to pious or scholarly works. It is assumed to apply especially to poetry and drama.

The concept was first popularised by Edward Arber in 1870. Arber wrote that "The Poets of that age, wrote for their own delectation and for that of their friends: and not for the general public. They generally had the greatest aversion to their works appearing in print.". This was said to be linked to the ideal of the courtier promoted by Baldassare Castiglione, who wrote that courtiers should keep their poetic work close, only circulating them among friends.

The argument was supported by statements from George Puttenham regarding "courtly makers" who wrote poetry but who did not circulate it beyond a small circle of friends. Earlier aristocratic poets such as Thomas Wyatt and Henry Howard, Earl of Surrey had made no effort to have their works published; their poems only appeared in print after the authors' deaths. J.W. Saunders argued that for such poets publication was "an unimportant and somewhat discreditable aspect of authorship".

While there is good evidence that aristocratic authors often acted as though they were indifferent to print publication, a number of scholars have doubted that there was any stigma associated with it by the Elizabethan age. Saunders refers to the "unimportance of the printed-book audience" for such writers. According to Ian Hamilton, the practice — if it existed — was honoured more in the breach than in the observance. Steven May argues that while there is almost no aristocratic publication of creative literature in the early Tudor period, the publication of poetry is fairly common in the reign of Elizabeth, indicating that there was little or no stigma attached to it by this period.
