= Herménégilde Duchaussoy =

French meteorologist (1854–1934)

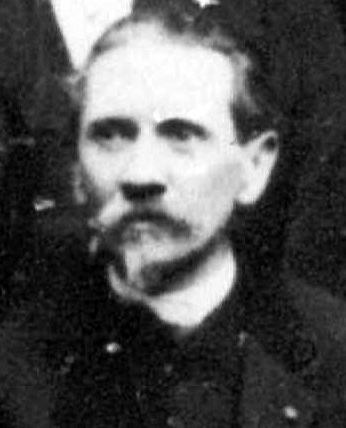
Herménégilde Duchaussoy in 1914 (O. Hacquart)

Joseph Herménégilde Duchaussoy (6 May 1854 – 17 April 1934) was a French meteorologist.
