= Jacques Duchaussoy =

Jacques Duchaussoy is a French author of books on religion and literature. Among his works are Bacon, Shakespeare ou Saint-Germain (1962), a non-fiction book that discussed the possibility of Francis Bacon ghost writing for Shakespeare and Miguel de Cervantes; Le Bestiaire divin ou la Symbolique des animaux (1993, ISBN 2-7029-0282-0); and La tradition primordiale dans les religions (1990, ISBN 2-85076-595-3). He also wrote for the magazine "Atlantis.

== Bibliography ==
- Bacon, Shakespeare ou Saint-Germain (1962),
- Le Bestiaire divin ou la Symbolique des animaux (1993, ISBN 2-7029-0282-0)
- La tradition primordiale dans les religions (1990, ISBN 2-85076-595-3).
- Mystère et Mission des Rose+Croix
