= Sky Sports Radio =

Radio station in Sydney, Australia

- Sydney; Australia
- Broadcast area: Sydney, Canberra and Regional New South Wales
- Frequency: 1017 kHz AM (1978–) (Sydney)
- Branding: Sky Sports Radio

Programming
- Format: Racing and sport

Ownership
- Owner: Sky Racing; (2KY Broadcasters Pty Ltd)

History
- First air date: 31 October 1925
- Former frequencies: 1070 kHz AM (1925–1935); 1020 kHz AM (1935–1978)

Technical information
- Transmitter coordinates: 33.8397°S 151.0611°E

Links
- Website: www.skyracing.com.au

Sky Sports Radio (formerly 2KY) is a commercial radio station based in Sydney, broadcasting throughout New South Wales and Canberra on a network of over 140 narrowcast transmitters as well as the main 1017 AM frequency in Sydney. It broadcasts live commentary of thoroughbred, harness and greyhound racing. Over 1,500 races are covered each week, including the pre- and post-race form and TAB betting information.

== History ==
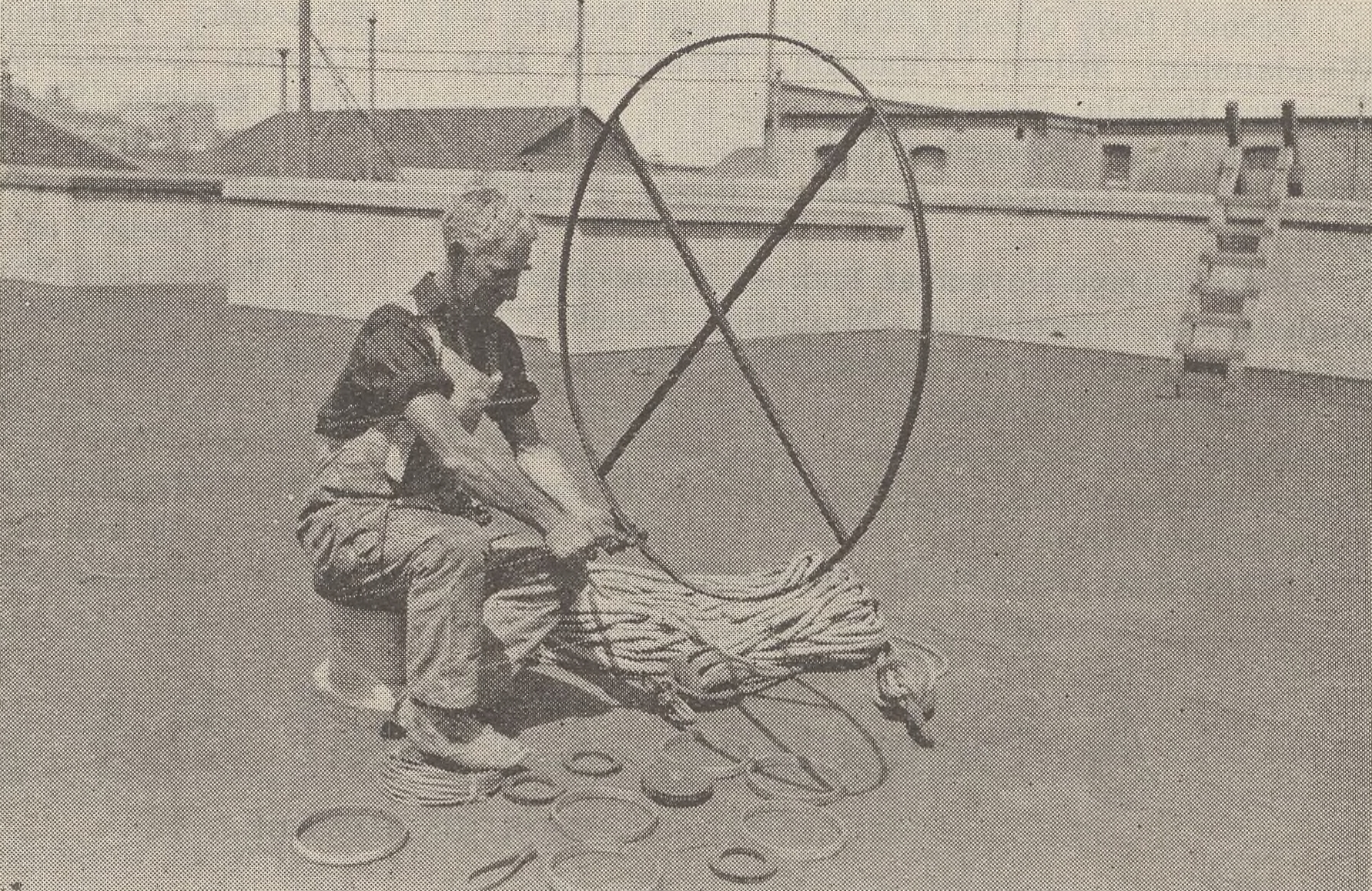
Radio 2KY aerial being prepared prior to opening

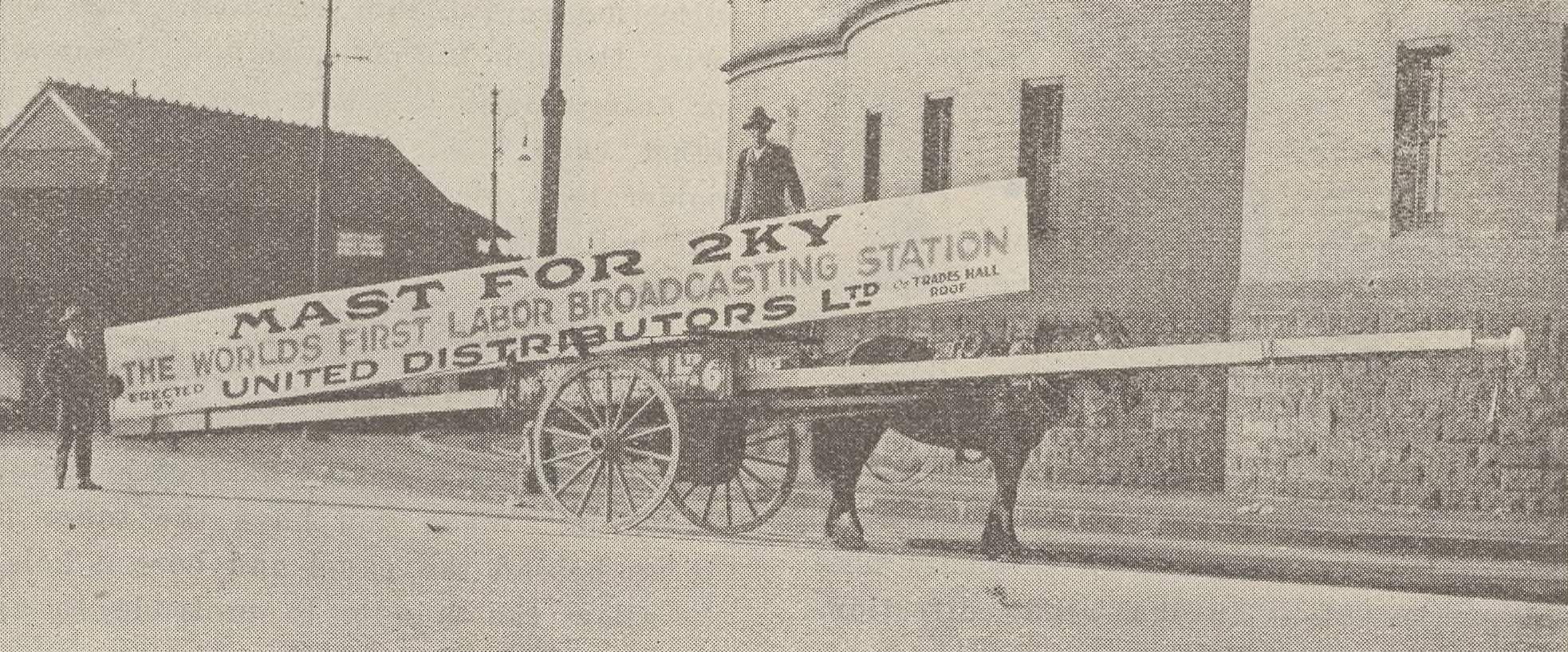
Radio 2KY mast on the way to transmitter site

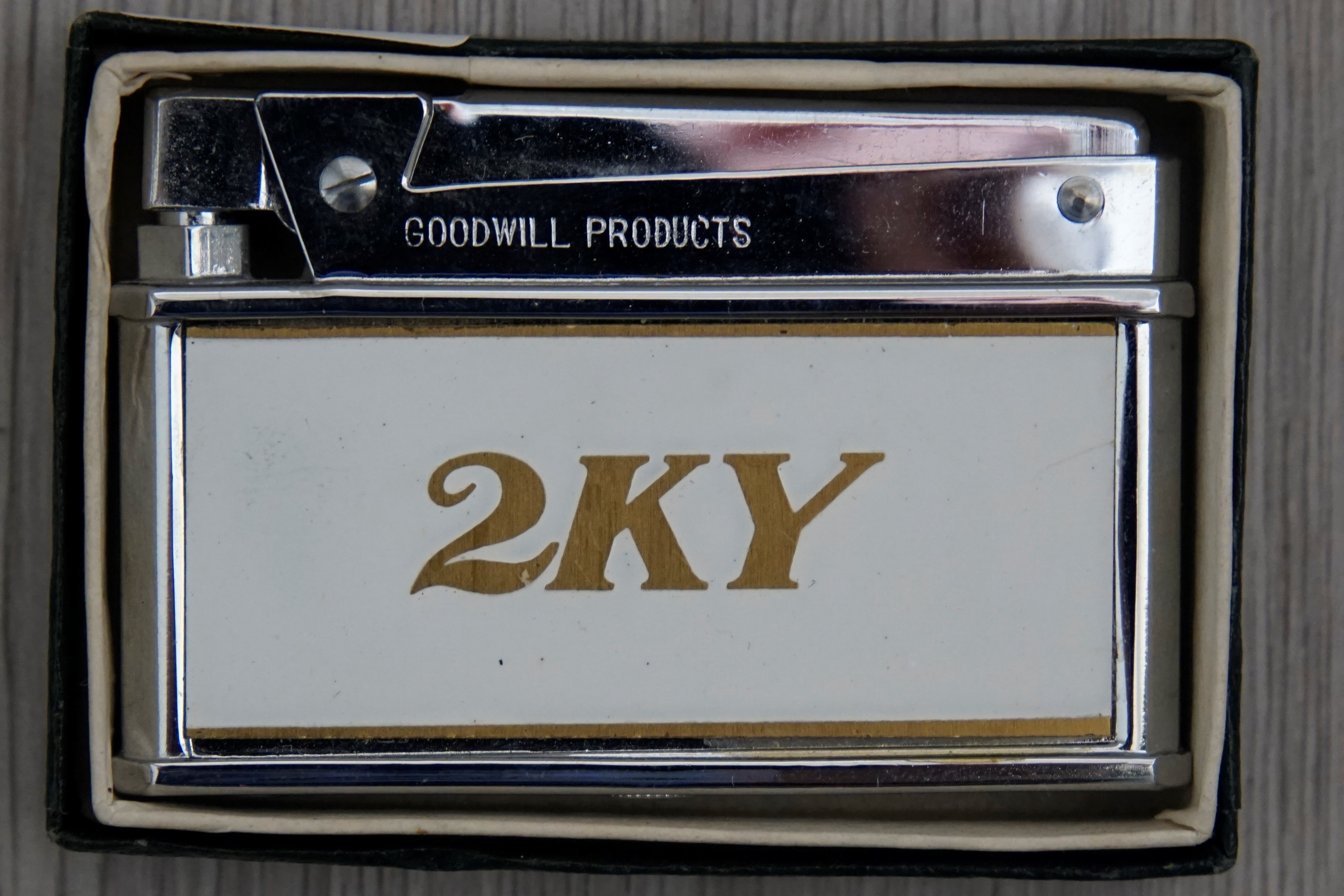
Promo lighter from the '60s

Sky Sports Radio was founded as 2KY by Emil Voigt, under the ownership of the Labor Council of New South Wales, with the aim of broadcasting "musical entertainment, news, weather, market reports, public debates and matters of educational value". Night broadcasts of trotting began in 1949, with greyhound racing following soon after. In the 1960s, the station took over thoroughbred racing commentary from 2GB. By the mid-1970s, Saturday afternoon racing broadcasts had started.

In 1992, the station started establishing a statewide network of narrowcast relay transmitters. 2KY was one of the pioneering stations of Digital Audio Broadcasting in Australia. In 2001, 2KY was acquired by Sky Racing and, in 2009, rebranded as Sky Sports Radio. Its studios moved from Parramatta to Frenchs Forest in 2015.

In 2005, 2KY closed its newsroom, in favour of taking a feed from the Broadcast Operations Group. In March 2006, it was taken over by Macquarie Media.

== Programming ==
=== National Racing Service ===
The National Racing Service features every TAB meeting throughout Australia, as well as coverage of race meetings in New Zealand and Hong Kong and, to a lesser extent, the United Kingdom and United States. Although racing is the mainstay of 2KY, other sports are featured. The Big Sports Breakfast features a range of national and international sports each weekday morning.

=== Big Sports Breakfast ===
The Big Sports Breakfast is presented by Laurie Daley. Previous hosts have included Richard Freedman, Terry Kennedy and Michael Slater.

== Notable presenters ==
=== Current ===
- Laurie Daley

=== Former ===
Notable former presenters have included

- Tiger Black
- Ita Buttrose
- Ron Casey
- Jeremy Cordeaux
- Malcolm T Elliott
- Mike Gibson
- Greg Hartley
- Brian Howard
- Sid Jordan
- Don Lane
- Bob Maumill
- Rufus Naylor
- Gary O'Callaghan
- Bill Perryman
- Peter Peters
- Max Rowley
- John Singleton
- Michael Slater
- Jimmy Smith
- Ray Warren
- Michael Clarke
