= Brian Howard =

Brian Howard may refer to:

- Bryan Howard, accomplice to the Mahmudiyah rape and killings
- Brian Howard (poet) (1905–1958), English poet
- Brian Howard (basketball) (born 1967), American former basketball player
- Brian Howard (English footballer) (born 1983), English footballer
- Brian Howard (rugby union) (born 1981), American rugby union and American football player
- Bryan Howard (sprinter) (born 1976), American former sprinter
- Brian Howard (radio broadcaster), Australian radio announcer
- Brian Howard (Gaelic footballer), Gaelic footballer for Dublin
- Brian Howard, original member of the Apple Macintosh team
- Brian Howard, perpetrator of the 2014 Chicago Air Route Traffic Control Center fire
