= Aurora Regional Fire Museum =

Museum in Illinois, United States

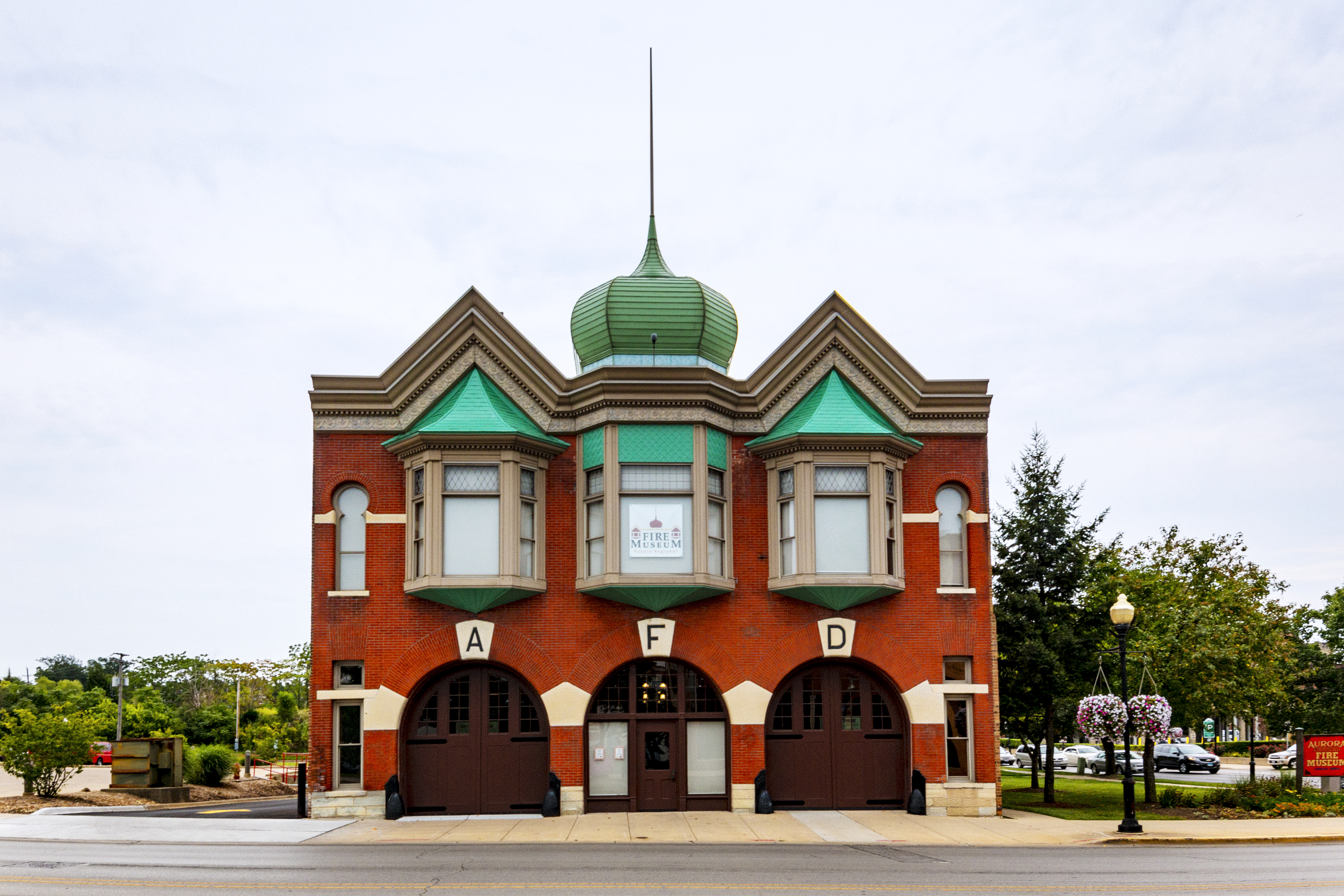
- Museum is the old "Station 1", next to present Central Fire Station
- Established: 1968
- Location: 53 N. Broadway; Aurora
- Coordinates: 41.7582°N 88.3115°W
- Type: Firefighting
- Website: www.auroraregionalfiremuseum.org

The Aurora Regional Fire Museum is an educational institution located in Aurora, Illinois, US. Its purpose is to preserve and exhibit the artifacts and history of fire departments in Aurora and the surrounding area, as well as to teach and promote fire safety and prevention.

== History ==
The museum was established in 1966, originally in the basement of Fire Station 4, opening to the public in 1968. The museum now located in the old Central Fire Station of Aurora, which was built in 1894. It has bay windows, a decorative cornice, an "onion-dome" and was asserted to be 'a model of its kind' when it was completed. It was used as a fire station until 1980. The museum moved into the old Central Fire Station, where it remains to this day, in 1990. Renovations were carried out between 2000 and 2004 to restore the original 19th century facade.

== Exhibits ==
The museum features a range of interactive exhibits. The exhibits cover firefighting throughout history, including antique Fire engines from the 1850s and 1940s. The museum also has a theater for community events.

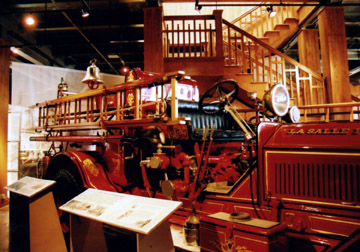
1918 American LaFrance fire engine, one of five historical appliances on exhibit

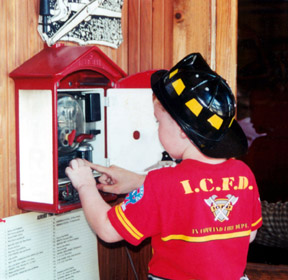
A large alarm gong that visitors may operate. One of the many hands-on exhibits in the Aurora Regional Fire Museum.

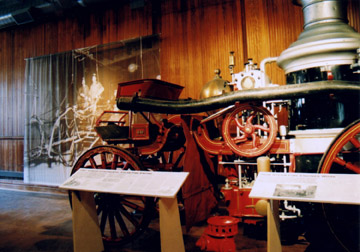
1908 Ahrens Steam fire engine

== Building ==
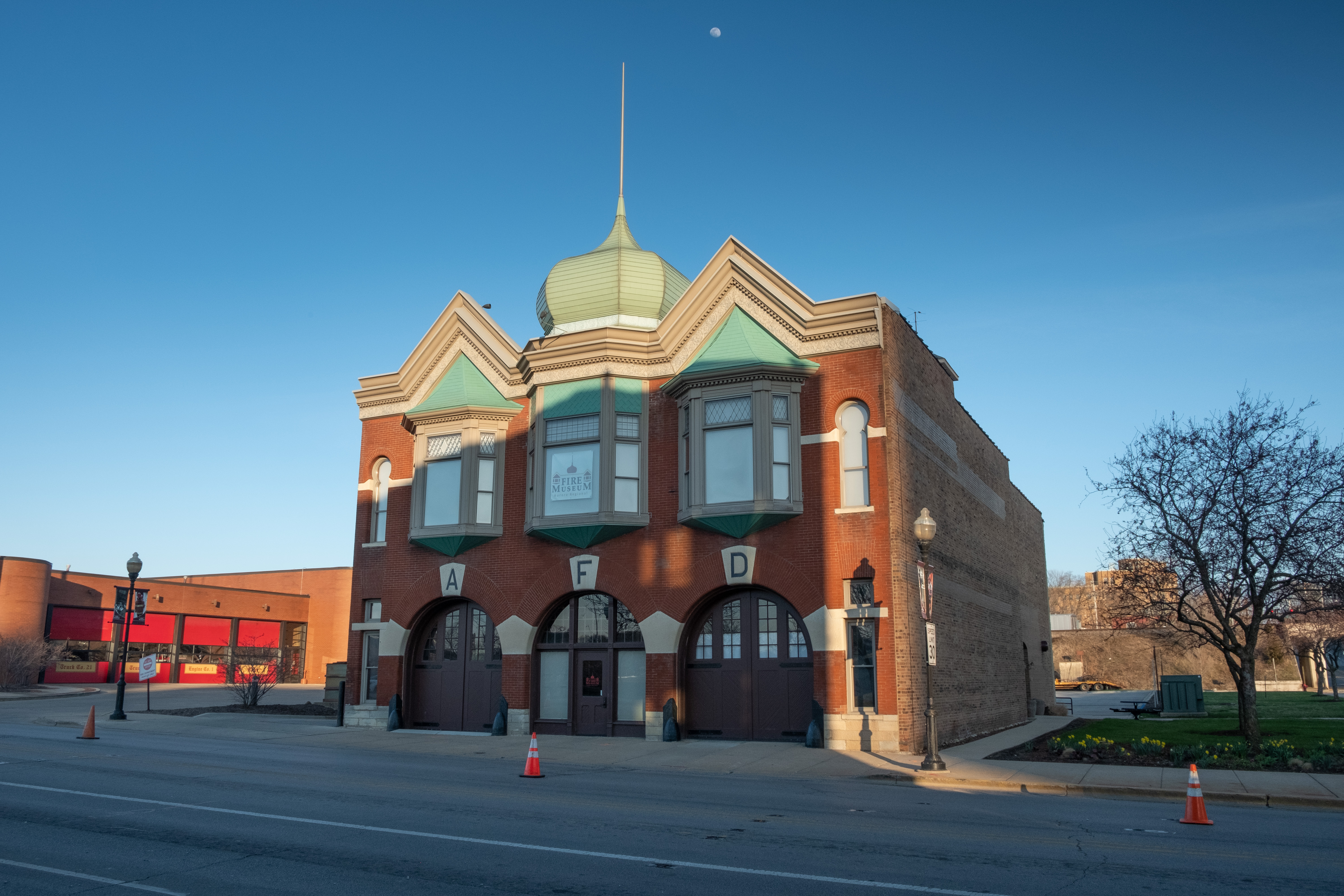
Fire museum building

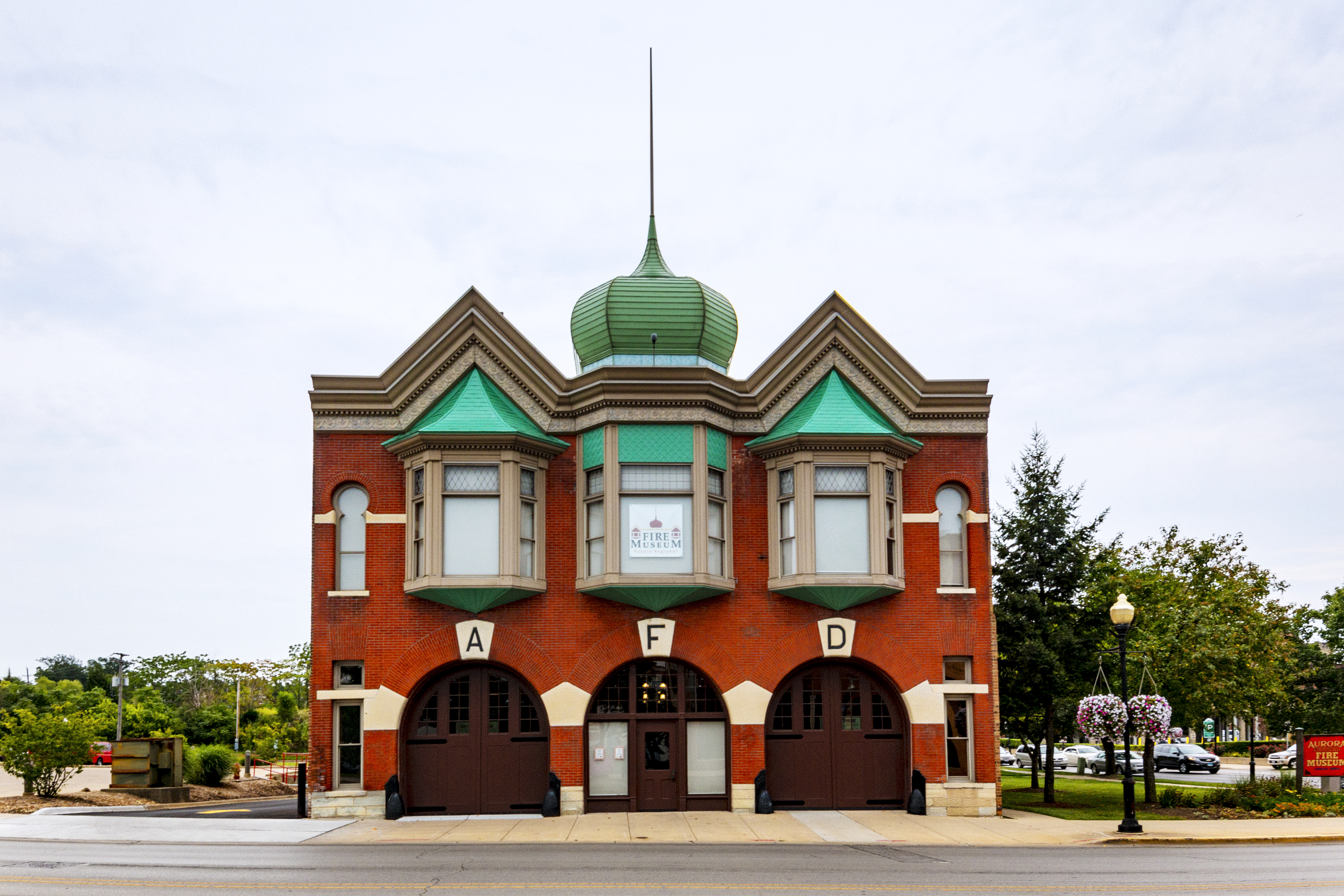
Fire museum building
