= Aurora Public Library (Illinois) =

Public library in Aurora, Illinois, US

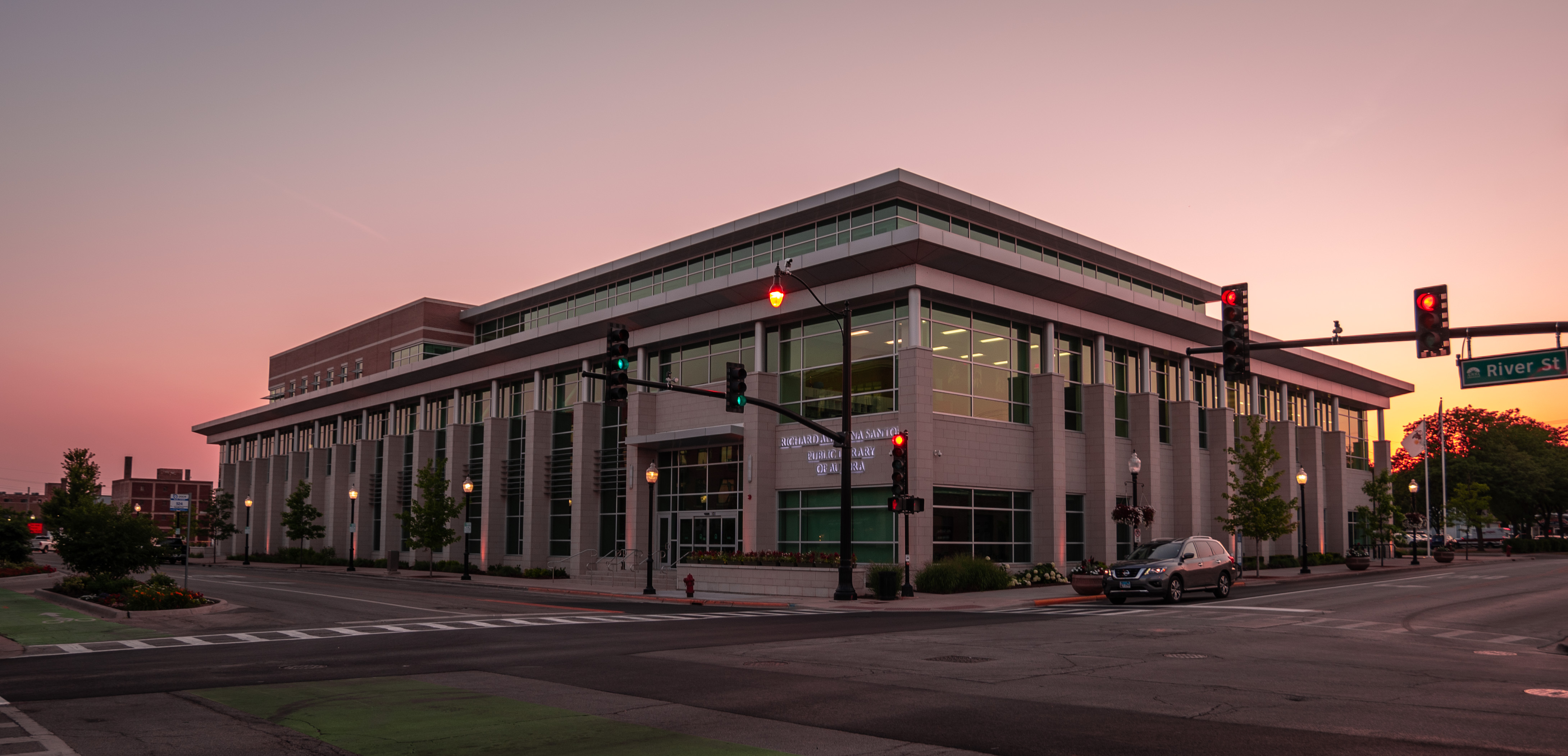
- 41.757067°N 88.320031°W
- Location: 101 South River Street, Aurora, Illinois, USA
- Type: Public
- Established: June 1, 1881
- Branches: 3

Collection
- Size: 366,338

Access and use
- Circulation: 1,614,664
- Population served: 197,899

Other information
- Director: Michaela Haberkern
- Website: www.aurorapubliclibrary.org

The Aurora Public Library is a public library in Aurora, Illinois, United States. It is made of up one central library with two branch libraries. In addition to these facilities the library runs a bookmobile, bringing its total service population to 200,000 people.

== History ==
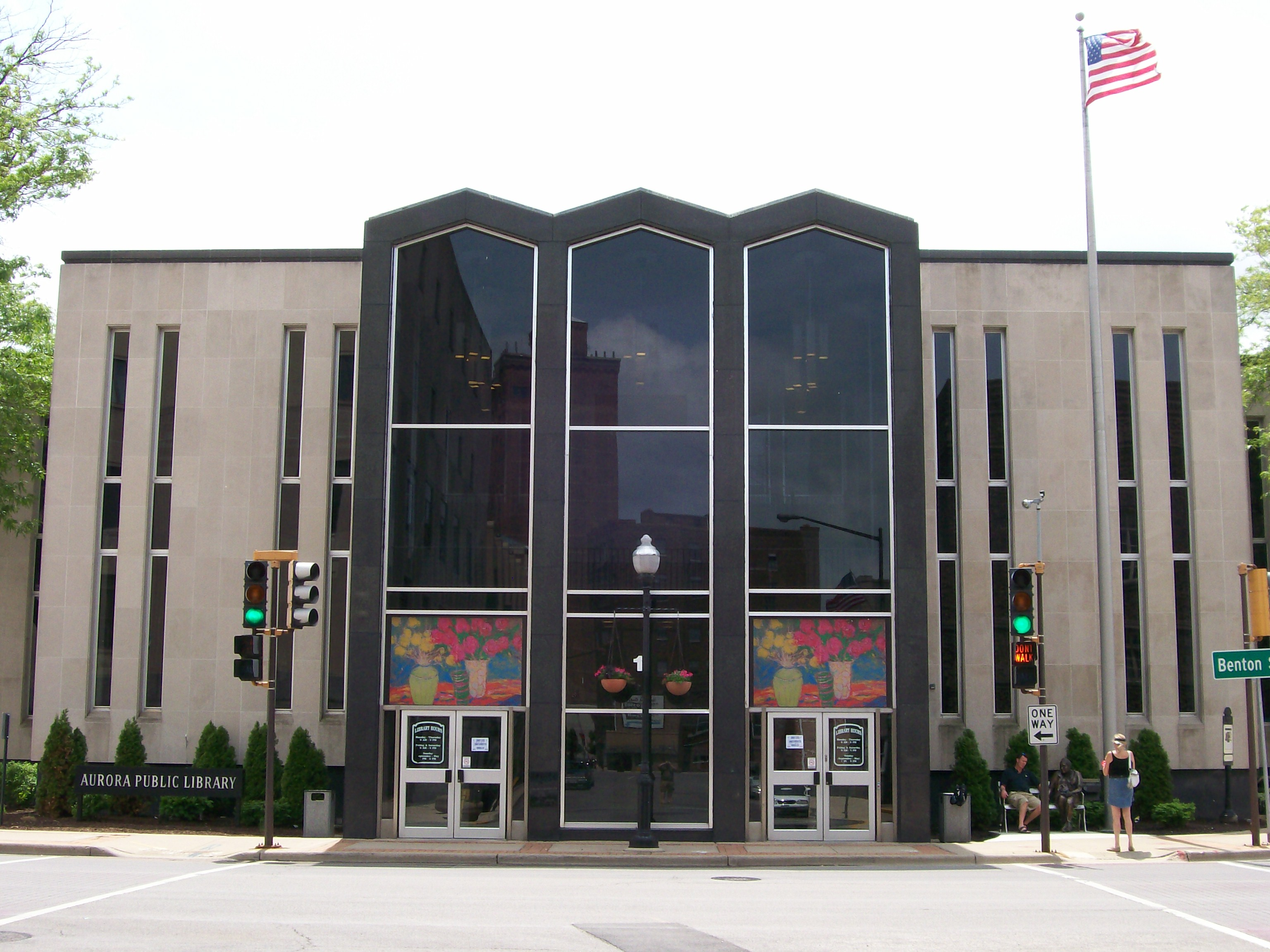
Former Aurora Public Library, 1904 to 2015

The first Aurora Public Library opened its doors on June 1, 1881, at the Aurora Memorial Hall . Interest in the library during its first years was high enough to fill its shelves by 1883 and warrant an expansion in 1885. Along with the expansion came reading rooms and available reserve stacks for the library's entire collection, but by 1900 the City of Aurora had grown to such an extent that the library again ran out of room. Members of the city came together in 1900 to appeal to Andrew Carnegie for funds to construct a new library. On January 16, 1901, Carnegie's reply came with a promise of $50,000 towards construction with the stipulation the City governance set aside $5,000 annually to the library's upkeep and maintenance. Since the library was already receiving $6,000 per year due to a city library tax the agreement with Carnegie was met and the library opened in 1904.

In 1969, this library became too small to meet the needs of the growing city around it, and a $500,000 renovation took place to completely replace the library with a building triple its size.

To increase more outreach to the public, branches were set up in various parts of the city. In October 1989, the Fox Valley Branch was temporarily established awaiting the construction of the Eola Road Branch which opened in 1993. Another library, the West Branch library, opened in 1998.

During the late 2000s, it again became apparent that the library was simply not big enough to store its entire collection. Plans began for a new building and the site of the former Beacon-News (at the southwest corner of Benton and River streets) was purchased in 2010 for its construction. The new library, costing $30 million, opened June 14, 2015.
