= William Tanner House Museum =

Historic house in Illinois, United States

- William A. Tanner House
- U.S. National Register of Historic Places
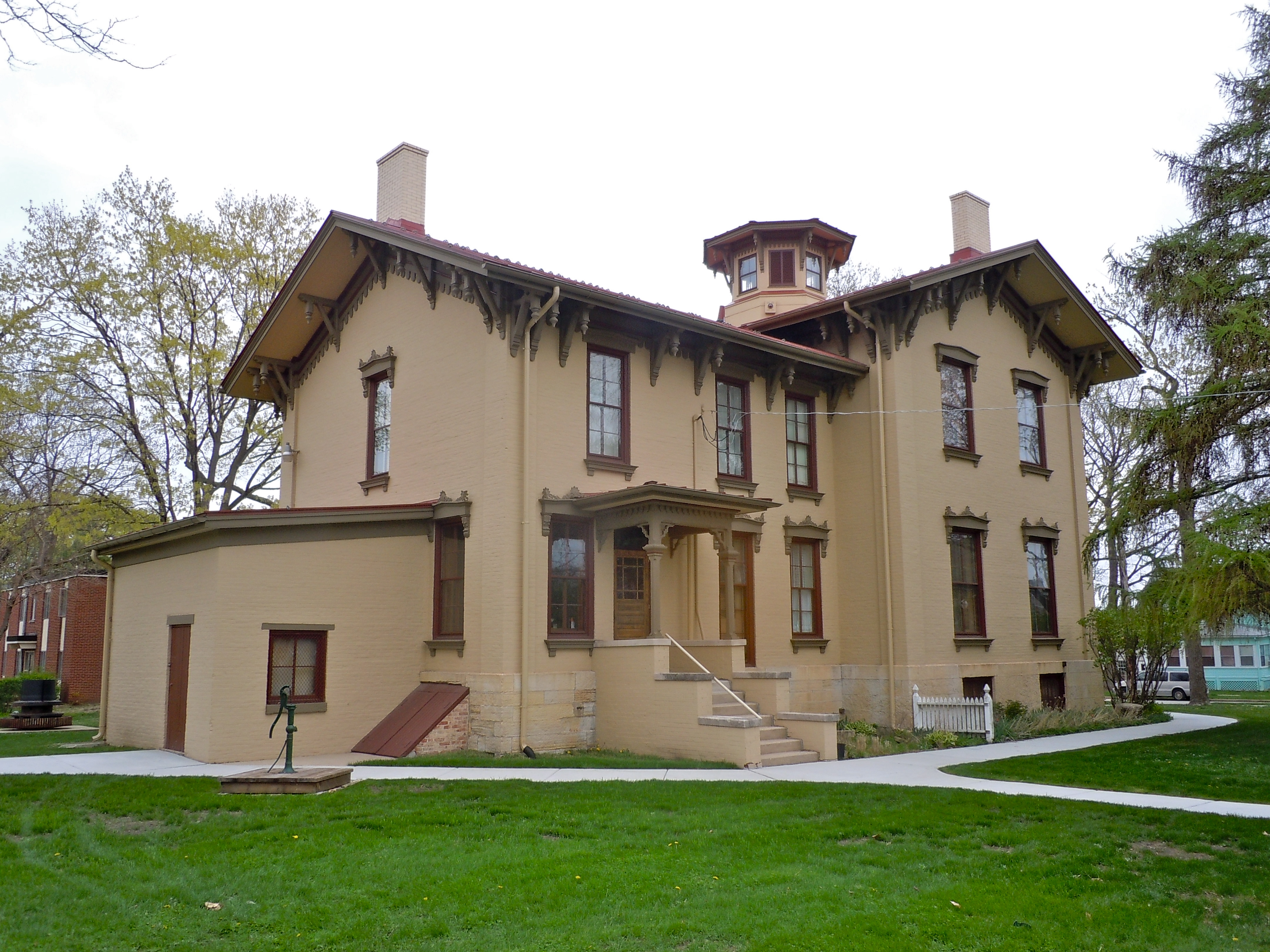
- Aurora Historical Museum in 2011

- Location within Illinois Location within the United States
- Interactive map showing the location of William Tanner House Museum
- Location: 304 Oak Ave. Aurora, Kane County, Illinois, United States
- Coordinates: 41°45′49″N 88°19′6″W
- Built: 1857
- Architectural style: Italianate
- NRHP reference No.: 76000711
- Added to NRHP: August 19, 1976

The William Tanner House Museum, also known as the William A. Tanner House, is a historic residence and museum in Aurora, Illinois. It was built in 1857 for William A. Tanner, a hardware merchant. His descendants lived in the house until it was donated to the Aurora Historical Society in 1936. It now operates as a Victorian-period historic house museum.

== History ==
William A. Tanner was one of the first residents in Aurora, Illinois. He moved from Watertown, New York, in 1835 shortly after Joseph and Samuel McCarty built the first mill in Aurora. Tanner was a land surveyor who noted the commercial potential of the Aurora area. He purchased a large tract of land on the west side of the river and invited his family, still in New York, to move in with him. For the next four years, Tanner harvested the land, until he briefly moved back to New York in 1839 to marry Anna Plum Makepeace. They moved back to Aurora the following year, working the farm until 1853. Together they had ten children; with this large family, Tanner required a larger house. After a few years living downtown, they moved to this house. Tanner now worked as a hardware businessman; his hardware firm stayed in business until 1979 and was the longest-running business in town. The Tanner family (and their descendants) lived in the house until 1936, when two of the children donated it to the Aurora Historical Society. On August 19, 1976, it was recognized by the National Park Service with a listing on the National Register of Historic Places.

The Aurora Historical Society now operates the house as a museum. Free tours run from April through September. In addition, visitors are encouraged to come to the Tanner House on July 4 to celebrate Independence Day with various family activities that take place on the grounds, as well as in December (the home is decorated for the Christmas season).

== Architecture and layout ==
The house was constructed in the Italianate style in 1857. The two-story, brick house is built like a Latin Cross, with an octagon cupola at the center. The first floor features the parlor, music room, kitchen, dining room, library, and a master bedroom and bathroom. The second floor is exclusively bedrooms.
