= Old Second National Bank =

- U.S. National Register of Historic Places
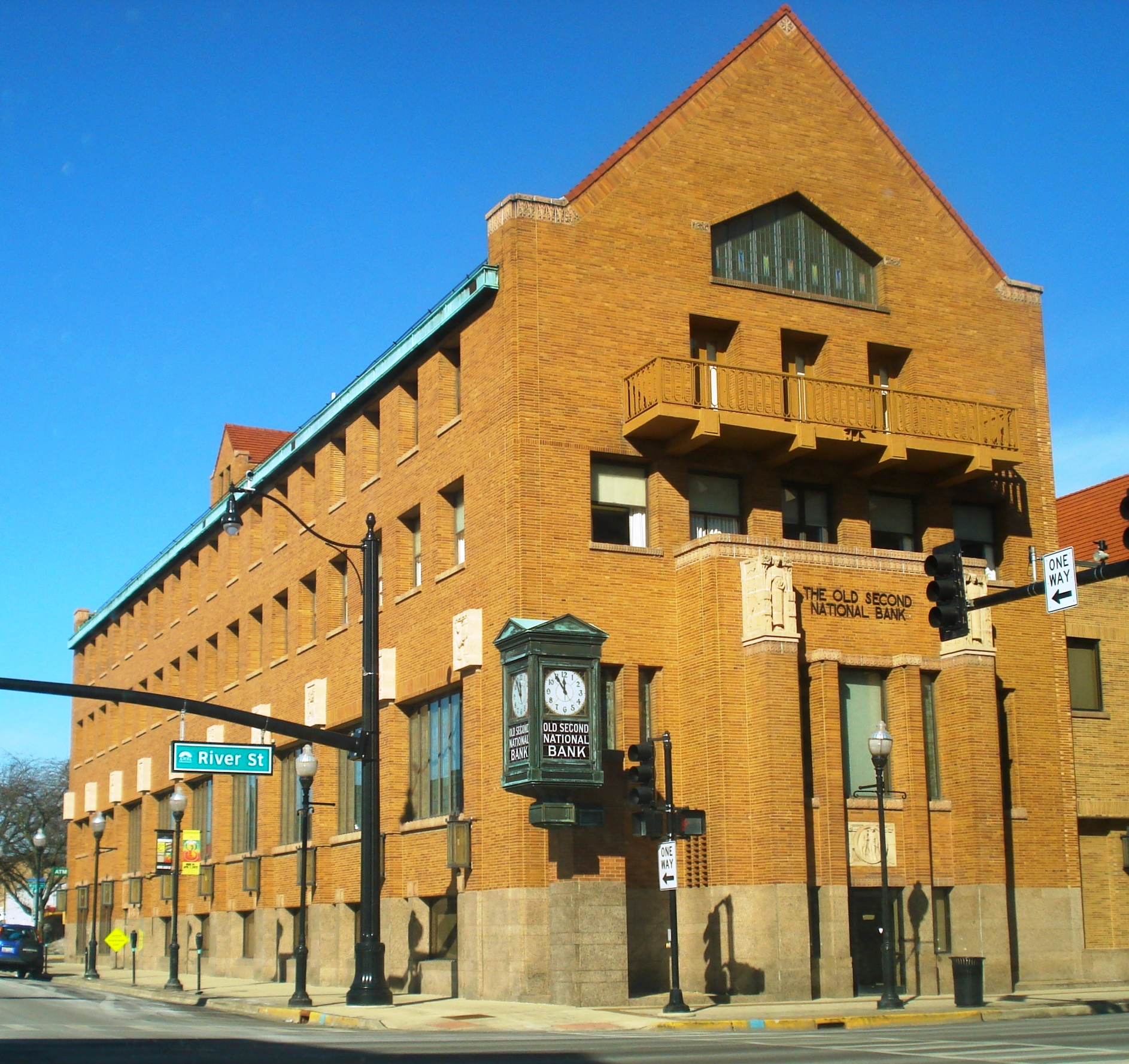
- Old Second National Bank in 2012

- Location within Illinois Location within the United States
- Location: 37 S. River St; Aurora, Kane County, Illinois, United States
- Coordinates: 41°45′28″N 88°19′6″W
- Built: 1924; 102 years ago
- Architect: George Grant Elmslie
- Architectural style: Prairie School
- NRHP reference No.: 79000840
- Added to NRHP: May 8, 1979

The Old Second National Bank of Aurora is a historic building in Aurora, Illinois. It was designed in the Prairie School style by George Grant Elmslie, and was one of his last commissions.

== History ==
The Old Second National Bank of Aurora was designed by George Grant Elmslie in 1924. The Prairie School style of design was, at this point, already a fading trend. Elmslie was nearing the end of his career and began to accept commissions for commercial buildings. Elmslie recruited sculptor Emil Settler, muralist John W. Norton, and sculptor Kristian Schneider to assist him with the design.

The bank building was a departure from previous Elmslie designs. Instead of focusing on horizontal patterns, this building attempted to integrate vertical patterns into a Prairie School design. The bank is built with Roman brick on a pink granite foundation. The building is topped with a saddleback roof with red tile. Ten brick columns rise from the foundation to the roof. Only the south side of the building features exterior details and ornaments. The narrow cornice is terra cotta and follows the gable. John Norton painted a three-panel mural of 1830s Aurora on the north side of the building's interior. A red tile floor was intended to resemble a large oriental rug. The building was added to the National Register of Historic Places on May 8, 1979.
