= Tiger Black =

Australian rugby league footballer, broadcaster & commentator

'Tiger' Black
Personal information
- Full name: Ernest Harold Black
- Born: 23 August 1918 Arncliffe, New South Wales, Australia
- Died: 30 August 1983 (age 65) Kogarah, New South Wales, Australia

Playing information
- Height: 5 ft 1 in (155 cm)
- Weight: 60 kg (9 st 6 lb)
- Position: Hooker
Club
Years	Team	Pld	T	G	FG	P
1940	St. George Dragons	2	0	0	0	0
- Source: Whiticker/Hudson

Ernest Harold 'Tiger' Black BEM (1918 – 30 August 1983) was an Australian rugby league footballer who played in the 1930s and 1940s. He later became a rugby league broadcaster and commentator.

== Playing career ==
Born and raised at Arncliffe, New South Wales, Ernie 'Tiger' Black began playing rugby league with his local Arncliffe Scots club in the early 1930s. He played Presidents Cup with St. George Dragons and was graded in 1937. He was a tenacious hooker, standing only 5 ft 1in (155 cm) and weighing only 60 kg. He raked against the biggest players of his day, always holding his own. Due to his small stature, and fearless disposition, he became forever known by the nickname 'Tiger'.

Black was a member of the Dragons' 1938 premiership winning Reserve Grade side - the first St. George Dragons team to win a premiership. He played several first grade games in 1940 before painful kidney and back injuries curtailed his career at the age of 22, although he won another premiership when he played in the victorious St. George Reserve Grade team in 1940. Upon retirement, 'Tiger' Black moved into club administration, and held many offices at St George over a number of years. In latter years he was a Director of the St. George Dragons.

== Media career ==
In 1946, 'Tiger' Black became a rugby league broadcaster with Sydney Radio station 2UW. Later, he moved to 2UE and lastly to 2KY. With 2KY, Black traveled the world many times, broadcasting Kangaroo Tours and World Cup matches. He is remembered alongside his great friend Frank Hyde, as one of the greatest rugby league callers of the 1950s and 1960s.

== Death ==
'Tiger' Black collapsed at his beloved St. George League Club on 30 August 1983, and died shortly afterwards. A hugely attended funeral at St. Davids Church Arncliffe, preceded his burial at Woronora Cemetery, Sutherland, New South Wales on 2 September 1983.

== Accolades ==
Black was awarded Life Membership of the St. George Dragons in 1965 and he was awarded the British Empire Medal (BEM) in the 1979 New Year Honours in recognition of service to sport. In 2014, 'Tiger' Black was inducted in the Sydney Cricket Ground Media Hall of Honour for service to the media.
