= Galena Hotel =

- Fox River House
- U.S. National Register of Historic Places
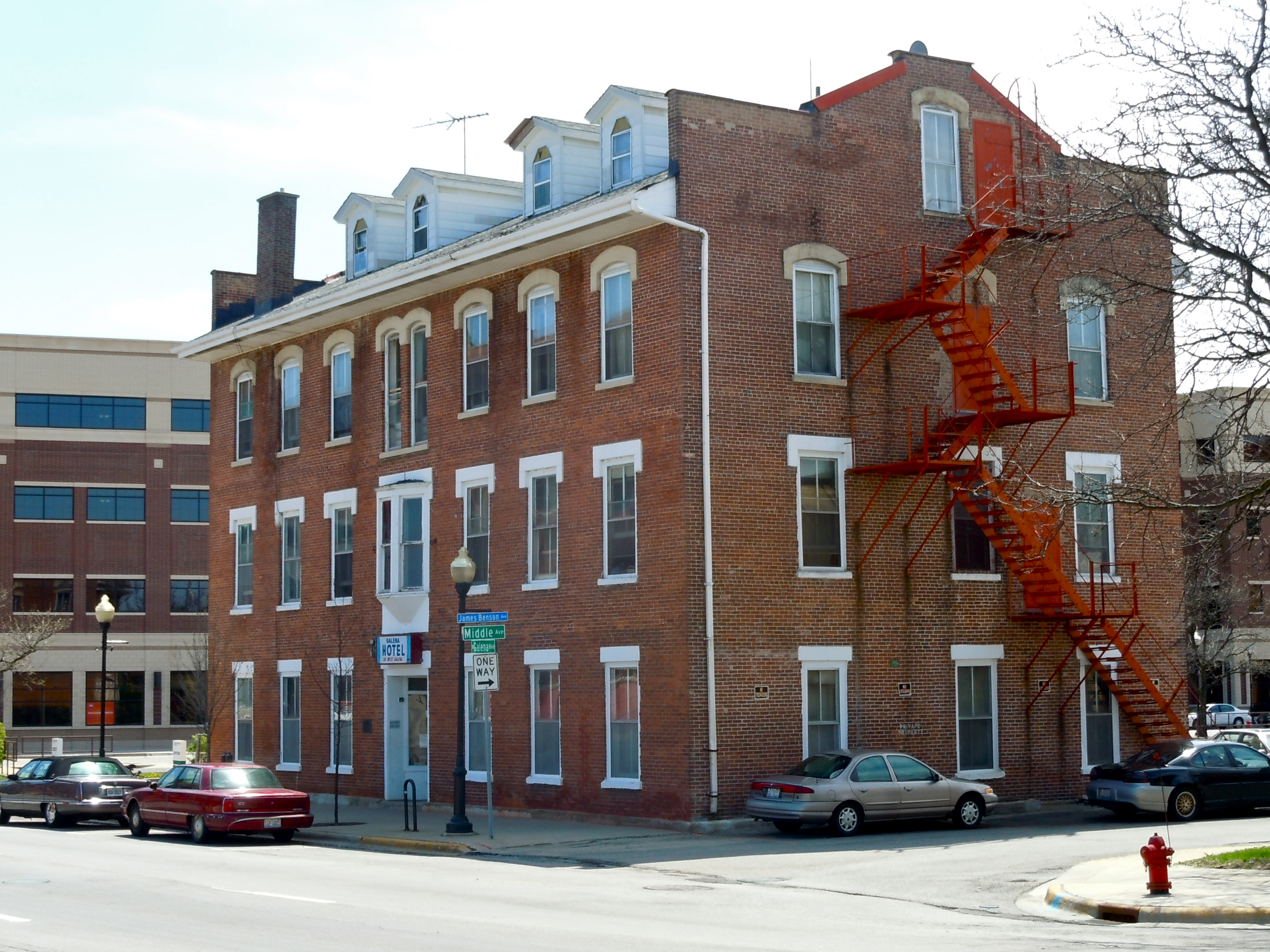
- Galena Hotel in 2011

- Location within Illinois Location within the United States
- Interactive map showing the location for Galena Hotel
- Location: 116 W. Galena; Aurora, Kane County, Illinois, United States
- Coordinates: 41°45′32″N 88°19′4″W
- Built: 1862
- NRHP reference No.: 76000710
- Added to NRHP: May 4, 1976

The Galena Hotel, originally known as the Fox River House, is a historic hotel in Aurora, Illinois. It is the oldest hotel still standing in the city.

== History ==
By the 1850s, Aurora was a major manufacturing and milling center in the Fox River valley. The Galena–Chicago trail, which carried stagecoaches from Chicago to northwestern Illinois, passed through town and provided a means of commerce. The first Fox River House was constructed in 1857 along this road for A. N. and G. Pierce. A fire destroyed the hotel in 1860. E. D. Huntoon purchased the vacant lot two years later to rebuild the hotel. The hotel was known as an important local gathering place. Huntoon ran the hotel for twenty-six years until selling it.

The new owner renamed the hotel the Northwestern Hotel in 1888. It was renamed to the Grand Hotel when sold to a Mrs. Jones in 1907. The Koummoutseas family purchased the hotel in 1961 and again renamed it the Galena Hotel. It is the oldest hotel still standing in Aurora. It was added to the National Register of Historic Places on May 4, 1976.

The structure is four stories tall plus a basement. The brick and limestone were locally fired and mined. Only the fourth floor remains consistent with the original design for the hotel, but little change has occurred on the exterior of the building.

This hotel was purchased by Nawab Khurram Khan and Dr. Shuja ul-Mulk in 1997 from Besey Koummoutseas.
