= Sid Jordan (broadcaster) =

Broadcaster

Sid Jordan (1877–1971), also S. H. Jordan or Syd Jordan, was an Australian broadcaster for 2KY, owned by the Trades and Labour Council, working as a news commentator from the late 1930s to 1948. Jordan also held various positions with the Communist Party of Australia and served as secretary of the State Unemployed Relief Workers Labour Council. He was under government surveillance and in 1948 dismissed in a climate of increasing anti-Communism.
