= Aurora, Illinois =

- City
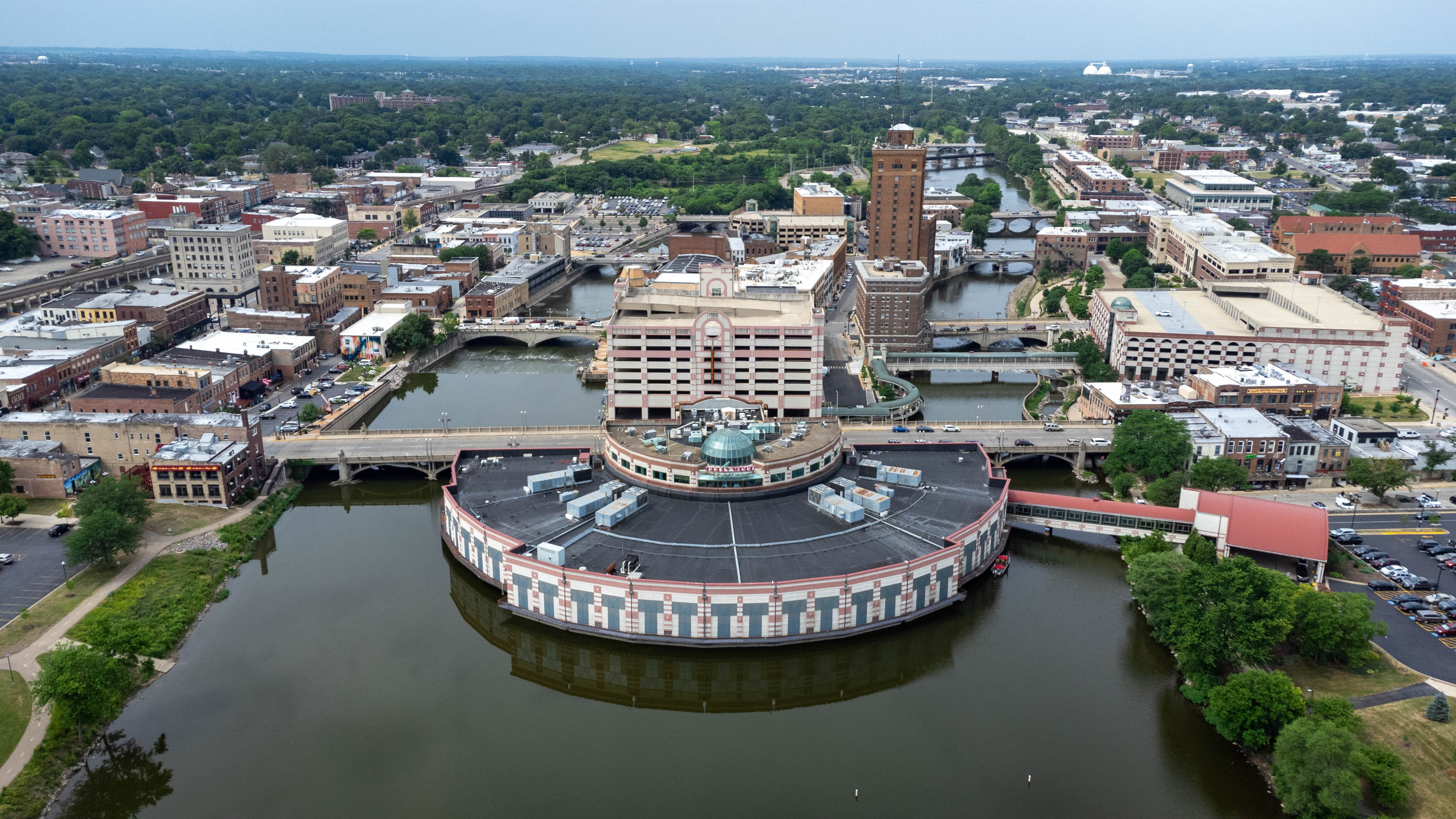
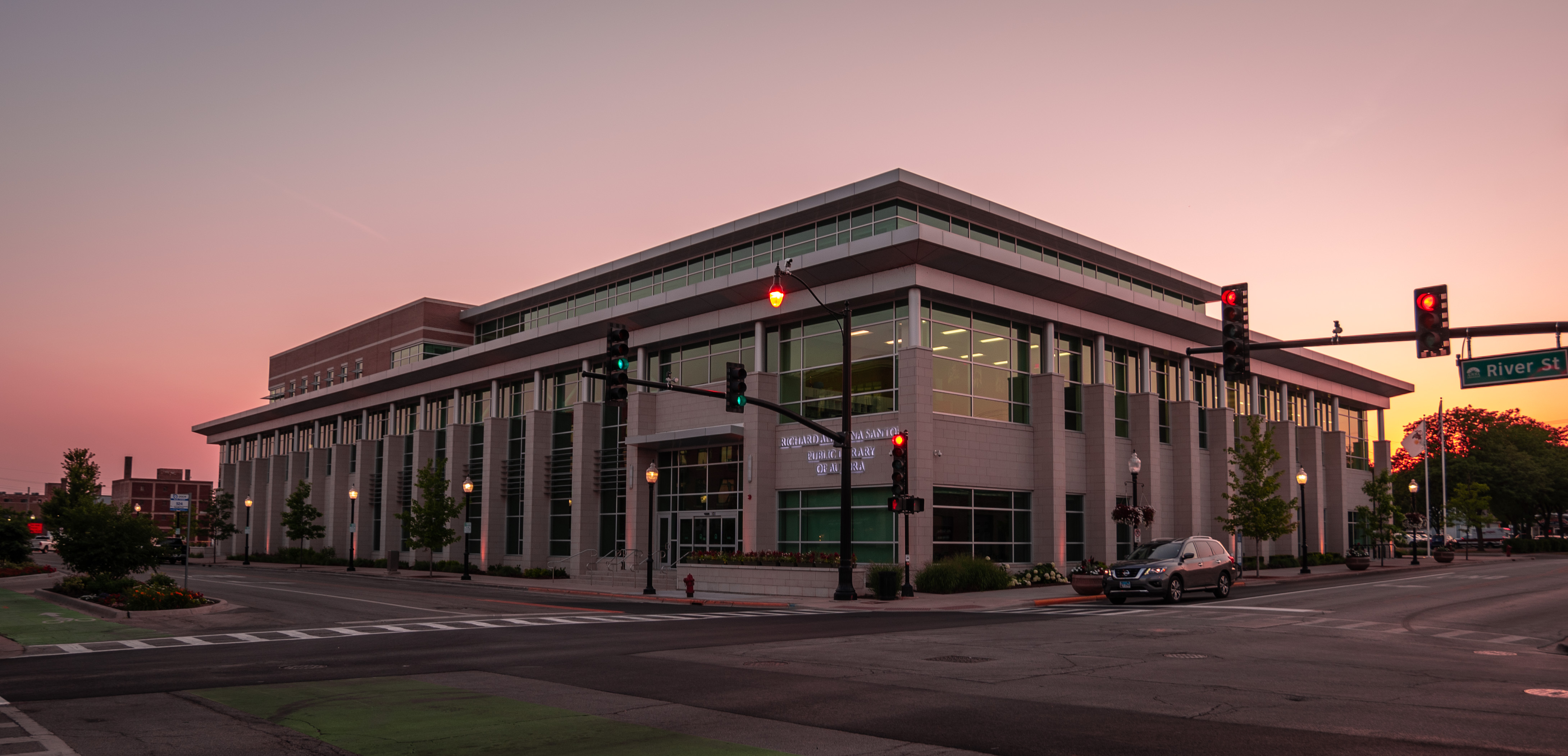
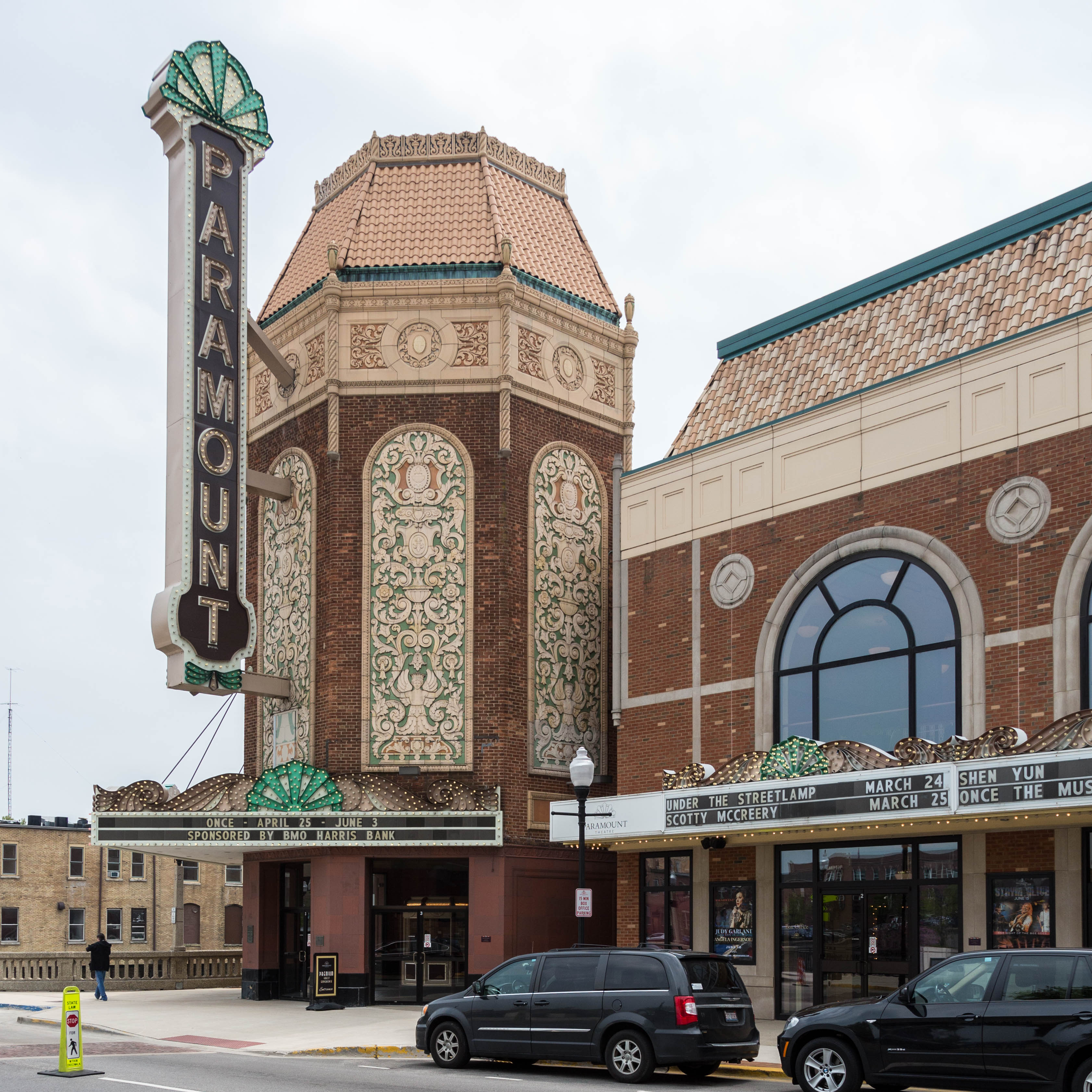
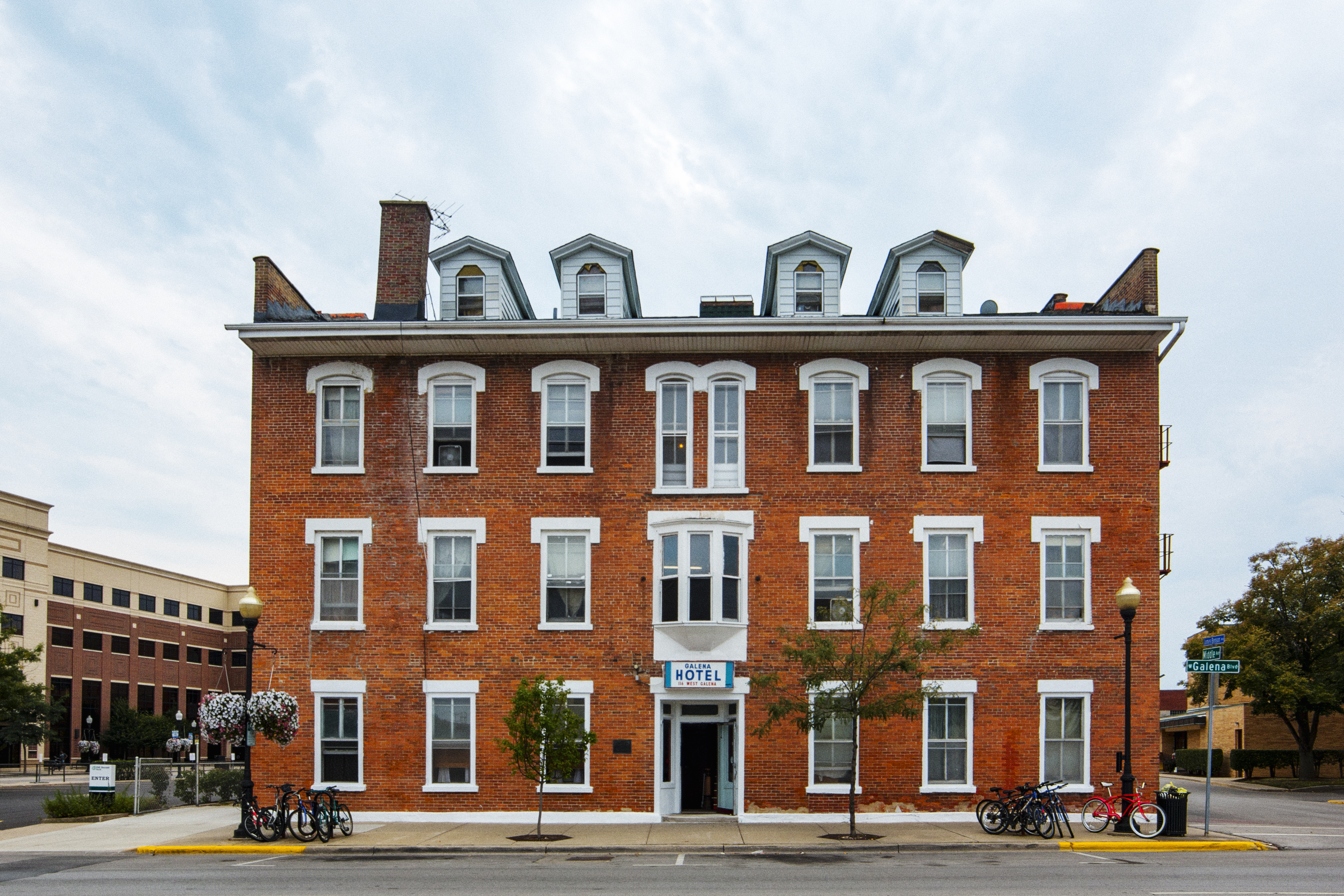
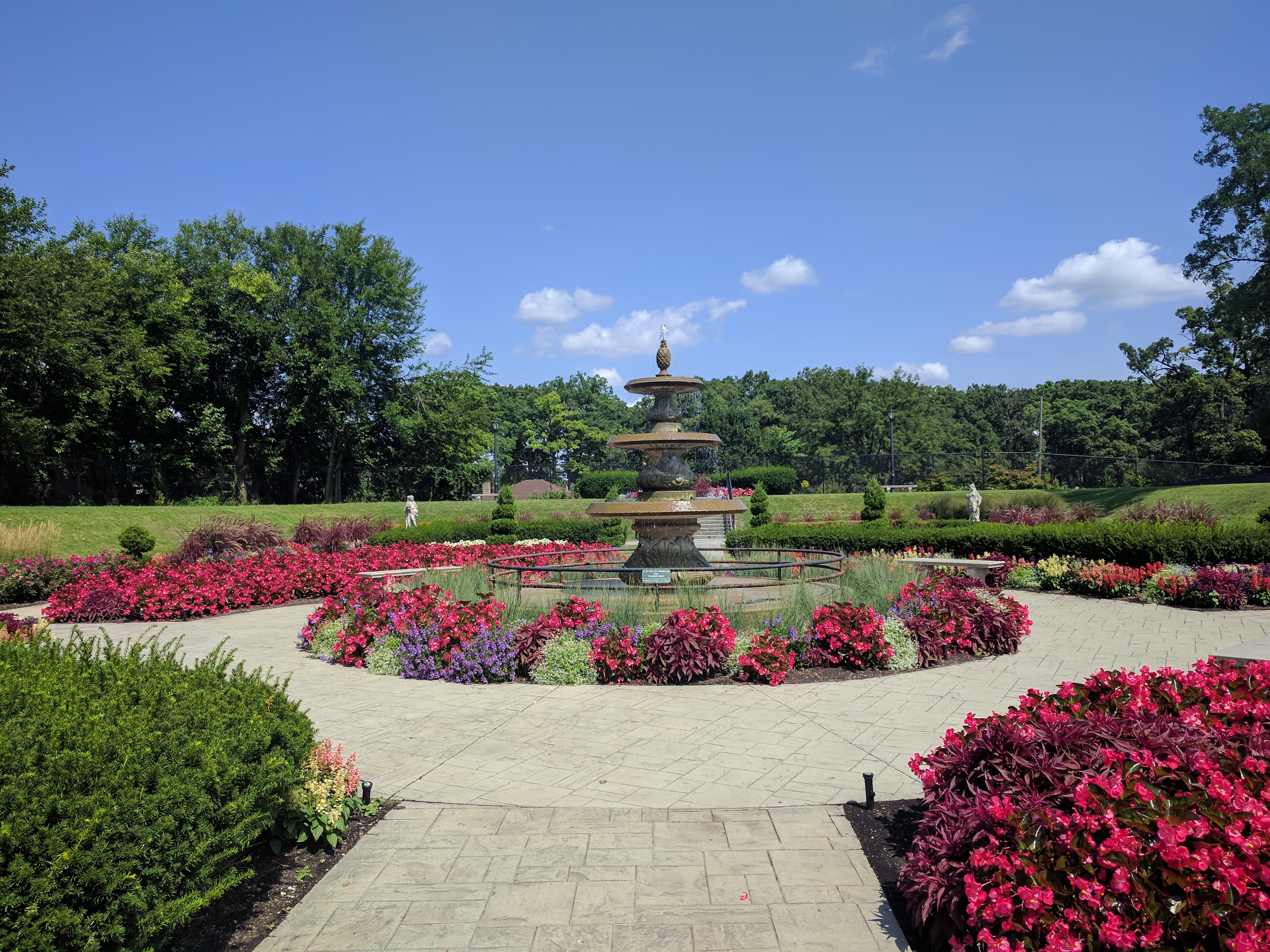
- Downtown Aurora Aurora Public Library Paramount Theater Galena Hotel Phillip's Park

- Flag Seal Wordmark
- Nickname: City of Lights
- Motto: A City Second to None
- Interactive map of Aurora, Illinois
- Location within Chicago metropolitan area Location within Illinois Location within the United States
- Coordinates: 41°45′50″N 88°17′24″W
- Country: United States
- State: Illinois
- Counties: DuPage, Kane, Kendall, Will
- Townships: Aurora (Kane), Batavia (Kane), Sugar Grove (Kane), Naperville (DuPage), Winfield (DuPage), Oswego (Kendall), Wheatland (Will)
- Settled: 1834; 192 years ago
- Incorporated (village): 1845; 181 years ago
- Incorporated (city): 1857; 169 years ago
- Founder: McCarty Brothers

Government
  - Type: Mayor–council
  - Mayor: John Laesch (D)

Area
  - Total: 45.91 sq mi (118.91 km^{2})
  - Land: 44.97 sq mi (116.47 km^{2})
  - Water: 0.95 sq mi (2.45 km^{2})
- Elevation: 719 ft (219 m)

Population (2020)
  - Total: 180,542
  - Estimate (2024): 180,710 ▲
  - Rank: US: 144th
  - Density: 4,014.8/sq mi (1,550.13/km^{2})
- Time zone: UTC−6 (CST)
  - Summer (DST): UTC−5 (CDT)
- ZIP Codes: 60502–60507, 60568, 60569, 60572, 60598
- Area codes: 630, 331
- FIPS code: 17-03012
- GNIS feature ID: 2394031
- Demonym: Auroran
- Wikimedia Commons: Aurora, Illinois
- Website: www.aurora.il.us

Aurora is a city in northeastern Illinois, United States, located along the Fox River. The population was 180,542 at the 2020 census. It is the second-most populous city in Illinois, after Chicago, and the 144th-most populous city in the US. Aurora is the most populous city in Illinois that is not a county seat.

Founded within Kane County, Aurora's city limits have expanded into DuPage, Kendall, and Will counties. Once a mid-sized manufacturing city, Aurora has grown since the 1960s into a large city within the Chicago metropolitan area. In 1908, Aurora adopted the nickname "City of Lights", because in 1881 it was one of the first cities in the United States to implement an all-electric street lighting system.

Aurora's historic downtown is centered on Stolp Island. The city is divided into three regions, the West Side, East Side, and Far East Side/Fox Valley. The Aurora area has architecture by Frank Lloyd Wright, Ludwig Mies van der Rohe, Bruce Goff and George Grant Elmslie. Aurora is also home to over 50 Sears Catalog Homes and seven Lustron all-steel homes.

== History ==
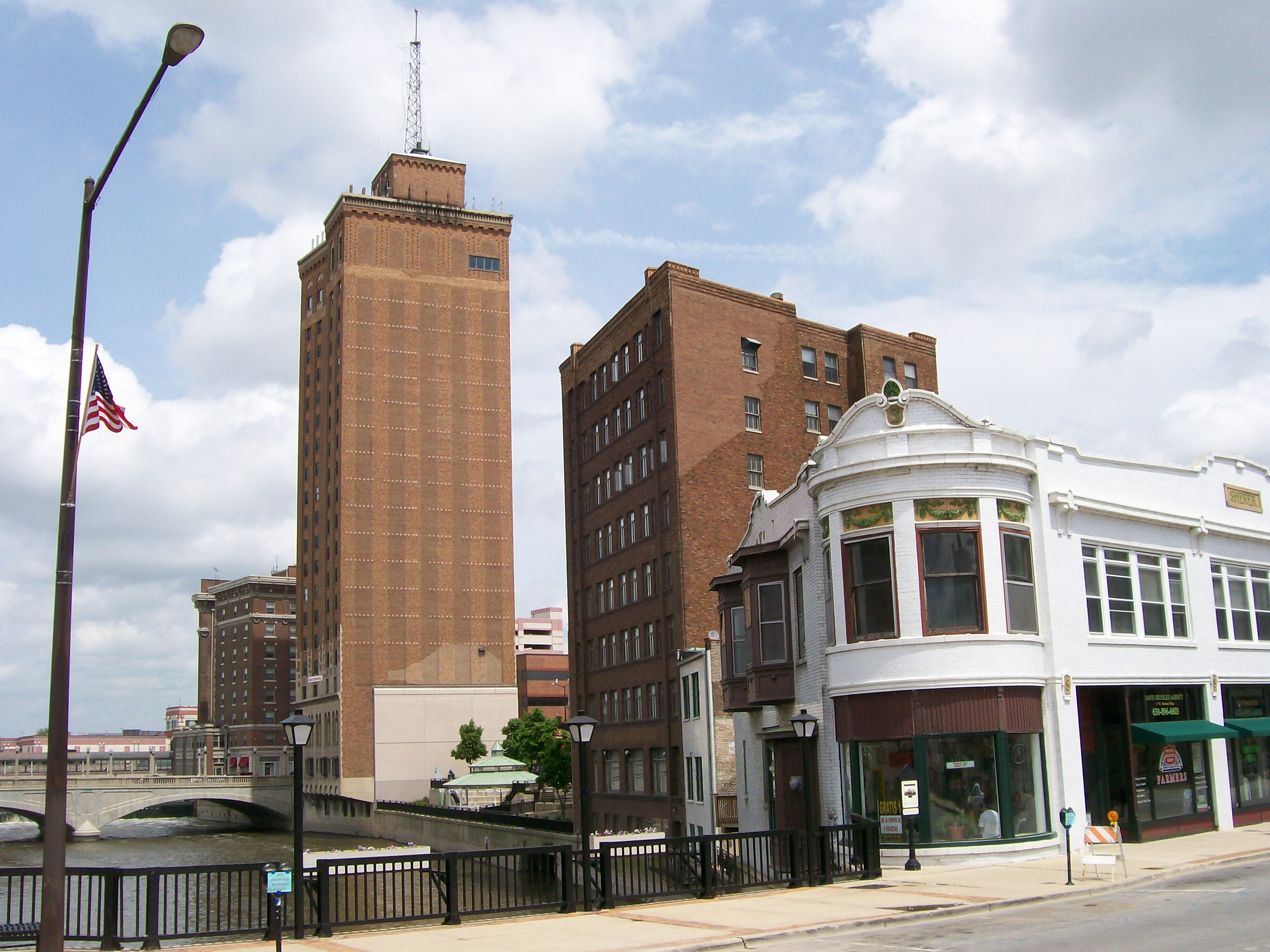
View of Stolp Island historic buildings from Downer Place with architectural details, such as these terracotta tiles.

Before European settlers arrived, there was a Native American village in what is today downtown Aurora, on the banks of the Fox River. In 1834, following the Black Hawk War, the McCarty brothers settled on both sides of the river, but subsequently sold their land on the west side to the Lake brothers, who opened a mill. The McCartys lived on and operated a mill on the east side. Aurora was established with the building of a post office in 1837.

Aurora began as two villages: East Aurora, incorporated in 1845 on the east side of the river, and West Aurora, formally organized on the west side of the river in 1854.

Between 1850 and 1870 a wave of Luxembourgish immigrants settled in Aurora. In 1857, the two towns joined, incorporating as the city of Aurora. Representatives could not agree which side of the river should house the public buildings, so most of them were built on or around Stolp Island in the middle of the river.

As the city grew, it attracted numerous factories and jobs. In 1849, after failing to attract the Galena and Chicago Union Railroad building west from Chicago, the Aurora Branch Railroad was chartered to build a connection from Aurora to the G&CU at a place called Turner Junction, now West Chicago. Additional lines were built, including a direct line to Chicago, and in 1855 the company was reorganized into the Chicago, Burlington and Quincy Railroad. The CB&Q located its roundhouse and locomotive shop in Aurora, becoming the town's largest employer until the 1960s. Restructuring in the railroad industry resulted in a loss of jobs as passenger traffic dropped and the number of railroads decreased. The Burlington Railroad ran regularly scheduled passenger trains to Chicago. Other railroads built lines to Aurora, including the Chicago & Northwestern Railway to Geneva, the Elgin, Joliet and Eastern Railway to Joliet, Chicago, Milwaukee & Gary to Rockford, and the interurbans Chicago Aurora and Elgin Railroad, Aurora, Elgin and Fox River Electric Company, Chicago, Aurora and DeKalb Railroad, and Aurora, Plainfield and Joliet Railroad. With the exception of the EJ&E main line on the east side of the city and the former Burlington lines, all lines have been abandoned.

The heavy industries on the East side provided employment for generations of European immigrants, who came from Ireland, Great Britain, Scandinavia, Luxembourg, Germany, France, Romania and Italy. Aurora became the economic center of the Fox Valley region. The combination of these three factors—a highly industrialized town, a sizable river that divided it, and the Burlington railroad's shops—accounted for much of the dynamics of Aurora's political, economic, and social history. The city openly supported abolitionism before the American Civil War. Mexican migrants began arriving after the Mexican Revolution of 1910. Socially, the town was progressive in its attitude toward education, religion, welfare, and women. The first free public school district in Illinois was established in 1851 here and the city established a high school for girls in 1855.

During this period in the city's history, Aurora was also hit with one of the strongest earthquakes ever to strike Illinois, a M 5.1, on May 26, 1909

Later, the city developed as a manufacturing powerhouse which lasted until the early 1970s, when the railroad shops closed. Many other factories and industrial areas relocated or went out of business. By 1980, there were few industrial areas operating in the city, and unemployment soared to 16%. During the late 1970s and early 1980s, development began in the Far East side along the Eola Road and Route 59 areas. This was financially beneficial to the city, but it sapped retail businesses downtown and manufacturing in the industrial sectors of the near East and West Sides, weakening them. In the mid-1980s crime rates soared and street gangs formed.

During this time Aurora became much more ethnically diverse. The Latino population grew rapidly in the city during the 1980s. In the late 1980s, several business and industrial parks were established on the city's outskirts. In 1993, the Hollywood Casino was built downtown, which helped bring the first redevelopment to the downtown area in nearly twenty years. In the late 1990s, more development began in the rural areas and towns outside Aurora. Subdivisions sprouted up around the city, and Aurora's population soared.

On September 26, 2014, a fire at an air traffic control facility in Aurora (also known as the "Chicago Center") caused nearly 2000 airline flights to be grounded. Brian Howard, an employee of Harris Corporation, was charged in the incident.

On February 15, 2019, police responded to an active shooter situation in west Aurora to find that a former employee at the Henry Pratt Company had opened fire on fellow employees after being terminated from the company. Six people died, including the perpetrator who was shot and killed by responding police officers. Six others were injured, including five police officers. It was the first major shooting in the town's history.

== Geography ==
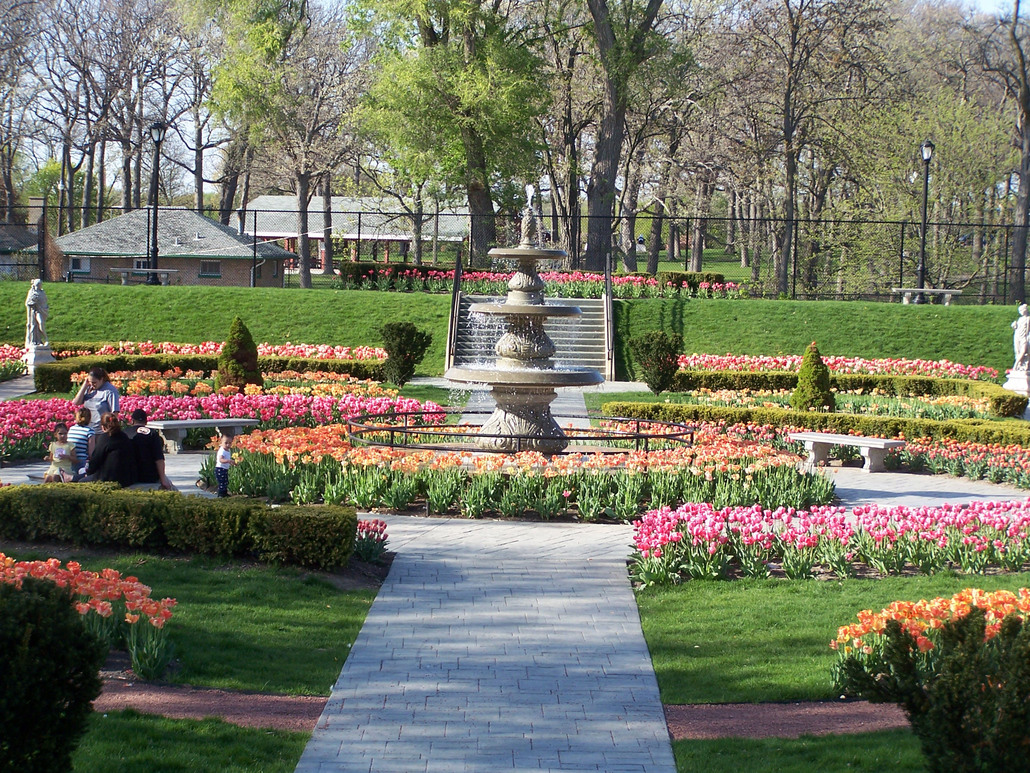
The Phillips Park 'Sunken Garden'

Aurora is at 41°45′50″N 88°17′24″W (41.7637855, −88.2901352).

Aurora has a total area of 45.91 square miles (118.91 km^{2}), of which 44.97 square miles (116.47 km^{2}) (or 97.94%) is land and 0.94 square miles (2.43 km^{2}) (or 2.06%) is water.

While the city has traditionally been regarded as being in Kane County, Aurora also includes parts of DuPage, Kendall and Will counties. Aurora is one of only three cities in Illinois that span four counties, the others being Barrington Hills and Centralia.)

=== Subdivisions ===
Politically, the city is divided into 10 wards. Large portions of Aurora can be described as being within three regions:

- The West Side, which is west of the Fox River.
- The East Side, which spans the region east of the Fox River, stopping at the DuPage County line.
- The Far East Side, a portion of Aurora east of the DuPage County line

These three regions are partly depicted in police boundaries and school districts.

=== Climate ===
Aurora is categorized as a hot-summer humid continental climate (Köppen Dfa). The annual precipitation for Aurora is about 40 inches. The record high for Aurora is 111 °F (44 °C), on July 14, 1936. The record low is −31 °F (−35 °C), on January 16, 2009. The average high temperature for Aurora in July is 83.5 °F (28.6 °C), the average January low is 12.6 °F (−10.8 °C).

On July 17–18, 1996, a major flood struck Aurora, with 16.94 inches (430 mm) of rain in a 24-hour period, which is an Illinois state record. Flooding occurred in almost every low-lying area citywide, as well as localized river inundation with neighborhoods bordering the Fox River.

In 1990, the supercell thunderstorm that produced the deadly Plainfield Tornado passed over the city, dropping golf ball-sized hail and causing wind damage. Less than ten minutes after passing through Aurora, the storm produced an F5 tornado, which touched down in nearby Oswego, less than 5 miles from downtown. The tornado then traveled through Plainfield and Joliet, killing 29 people.

Climate data for Downtown Aurora, Illinois (1991–2020 normals, extremes 1887–present)
Month	Jan	Feb	Mar	Apr	May	Jun	Jul	Aug	Sep	Oct	Nov	Dec	Year
Record high °F (°C)	70 (21)	72 (22)	84 (29)	92 (33)	104 (40)	106 (41)	111 (44)	105 (41)	103 (39)	93 (34)	81 (27)	70 (21)	111 (44)
Mean daily maximum °F (°C)	30.5 (−0.8)	34.9 (1.6)	47.0 (8.3)	59.8 (15.4)	71.1 (21.7)	80.5 (26.9)	84.0 (28.9)	82.1 (27.8)	75.8 (24.3)	62.8 (17.1)	47.8 (8.8)	35.6 (2.0)	59.3 (15.2)
Daily mean °F (°C)	23.2 (−4.9)	27.2 (−2.7)	37.9 (3.3)	49.6 (9.8)	60.6 (15.9)	70.3 (21.3)	74.4 (23.6)	72.6 (22.6)	65.5 (18.6)	53.0 (11.7)	39.7 (4.3)	28.7 (−1.8)	50.2 (10.1)
Mean daily minimum °F (°C)	16.0 (−8.9)	19.5 (−6.9)	28.9 (−1.7)	39.3 (4.1)	50.1 (10.1)	60.1 (15.6)	64.8 (18.2)	63.1 (17.3)	53.3 (11.8)	43.1 (6.2)	31.7 (−0.2)	21.8 (−5.7)	41.1 (5.1)
Record low °F (°C)	−26 (−32)	−25 (−32)	−15 (−26)	8 (−13)	21 (−6)	32 (0)	40 (4)	37 (3)	24 (−4)	11 (−12)	−11 (−24)	−25 (−32)	−26 (−32)
Average precipitation inches (mm)	1.86 (47)	1.83 (46)	2.35 (60)	4.05 (103)	4.86 (123)	4.50 (114)	4.19 (106)	3.86 (98)	3.37 (86)	3.70 (94)	2.71 (69)	2.19 (56)	39.47 (1,003)
Average snowfall inches (cm)	9.1 (23)	7.9 (20)	2.6 (6.6)	0.6 (1.5)	0.0 (0.0)	0.0 (0.0)	0.0 (0.0)	0.0 (0.0)	0.0 (0.0)	0.0 (0.0)	1.3 (3.3)	6.4 (16)	27.9 (71)
Average precipitation days (≥ 0.01 in)	9.0	7.9	9.7	11.7	12.6	11.1	9.1	9.1	8.4	9.3	8.7	9.3	115.9
Average snowy days (≥ 0.1 in)	5.6	4.2	1.9	0.4	0.0	0.0	0.0	0.0	0.0	0.0	1.0	4.0	17.1
Source: NOAA

== Demographics ==
Historical population
Census	Pop.	Note	%±
1850	1,200		—
1860	6,011		400.9%
1870	11,162		85.7%
1880	11,873		6.4%
1890	19,688		65.8%
1900	24,147		22.6%
1910	29,800		23.4%
1920	36,300		21.8%
1930	46,589		28.3%
1940	47,200		1.3%
1950	50,600		7.2%
1960	63,715		25.9%
1970	74,200		16.5%
1980	81,293		9.6%
1990	99,581		22.5%
2000	142,990		43.6%
2010	197,899		38.4%
2020	180,542		−8.8%
U.S. Decennial Census; 2010 2020

As of the 2020 census there were 180,542 people, 65,128 households, and 47,579 families residing in the city. The population density was 3,932.26 inhabitants per square mile (1,518.25/km^{2}). There were 62,763 housing units at an average density of 1,367.00 per square mile (527.80/km^{2}). The racial makeup of the city was 40.63% White, 10.87% African American, 1.65% Native American, 10.97% Asian, 0.05% Pacific Islander, 20.73% from other races, and 15.11% from two or more races. Hispanic or Latino of any race were 41.53% of the population.

There were 65,128 households, out of which 43.6% had children under the age of 18 living with them, 52.31% were married couples living together, 14.65% had a female householder with no husband present, and 26.95% were non-families. 21.39% of all households were made up of individuals, and 7.71% had someone living alone who was 65 years of age or older. The average household size was 3.56 and the average family size was 3.03.

The city's age distribution consisted of 28.2% under the age of 18, 9.6% from 18 to 24, 29% from 25 to 44, 23.2% from 45 to 64, and 9.8% who were 65 years of age or older. The median age was 34.4 years. For every 100 females, there were 98.7 males. For every 100 females age 18 and over, there were 95.1 males.

The median income for a household in the city was $74,659, and the median income for a family was $83,464. Males had a median income of $43,680 versus $30,572 for females. The per capita income for the city was $32,537. About 8.3% of families and 10.6% of the population were below the poverty line, including 14.7% of those under age 18 and 9.9% of those age 65 or over.

Aurora city, Illinois – Racial and ethnic composition Note: the US Census treats Hispanic/Latino as an ethnic category. This table excludes Latinos from the racial categories and assigns them to a separate category. Hispanics/Latinos may be of any race.
Race / Ethnicity (NH = Non-Hispanic)	Pop 2000	Pop 2010	Pop 2020	% 2000	% 2010	% 2020
White alone (NH)	74,457	78,924	61,017	52.07%	39.88%	33.80%
Black or African American alone (NH)	15,389	20,348	18,930	10.76%	10.28%	10.49%
Native American or Alaska Native alone (NH)	186	246	207	0.13%	0.12%	0.11%
Asian alone (NH)	4,313	13,105	19,659	3.02%	6.62%	10.89%
Native Hawaiian or Pacific Islander alone (NH)	28	53	61	0.02%	0.03%	0.03%
Other race alone (NH)	153	301	655	0.11%	0.15%	0.36%
Mixed race or Multiracial (NH)	1,907	3,113	5,032	1.33%	1.57%	2.79%
Hispanic or Latino (any race)	46,557	81,809	74,981	32.56%	41.34%	41.53%
Total	142,990	197,899	180,542	100.00%	100.00%	100.00%

=== Crime and social issues ===
In 2008, reported major crimes in Aurora were at their lowest level in nearly three decades. The Chief of Police attributed the drop to a number of factors but especially credited the hard work of the city's police officers and the increase in anti-gang priorities. Gang violence had reached a high in the 1990s, with the city averaging nearly 30 murders per year. In 2008, Aurora only had 2 murders. In July 2007, the Aurora Police Department and the FBI conducted "Operation First Degree Burn," a sweep that resulted in the successful arrest of 31 alleged Latin Kings gang members suspected of 22 murders dating back to the mid-1990s. Aurora has also adopted programs such as CeaseFire to reduce gang violence and prevent youths from joining gangs. Aurora had 7 murders in 2016.

Like other large Midwestern cities that once relied on manufacturing as an economic basis, Aurora has a large number of abandoned buildings and vacant lots, especially in older sections of the city. Efforts are ongoing to rehabilitate these areas.

Environmentally, Aurora has long dealt with pollution of the Fox River. The river was heavily polluted up until the 1970s by factories that had lined the river for over a century. Cleanup efforts have been successful with the help of state grants and volunteer efforts.

== Economy ==
Aurora is on the edge of the Illinois Technology and Research Corridor. The city has a long tradition of manufacturing as does much of Chicago metropolitan area. Prominent manufacturers, past and present include Lyon Workspace Products, The Aurora Silverplate Manufacturing Company, Barber-Greene Company, the Chicago Corset Company, the Aurora Brewing Company, Stephens-Adamson Company, Caterpillar Inc., Western Electric, Allsteel Metals, National Metalwares, and Western Wheeled Scraper Works (later Austin-Western Inc.). The most prominent employer and industry was the Chicago, Burlington and Quincy Railroad (later Burlington Northern) which was headquartered in Aurora.

According to the city's 2019 Comprehensive Annual Financial Report, the city's largest employers are:

#	Employer	# of Employees
1	Rush Copley Medical Center	2,200
2	West Aurora Public School District 129	1,650
3	East Aurora Public School District 131	1,320
4	Amita Health Mercy Medical Center	1,300
5	City of Aurora	1,280
6	Dreyer Medical Clinic	1,200
7	Indian Prairie School District 204	1,200
8	Caterpillar Inc.	1,100
9	Hollywood Casino Aurora	1,010
10	MetLife, Inc.	800

Formed in 1987, the Aurora Area Convention and Visitors Bureau (AACVB) is a private, nonprofit organization dedicated to aggressively promoting and marketing the area as a premier overnight destination. The AACVB'S goal is to enhance the economic and environmental well-being of a region comprising ten communities: Aurora, Batavia, Big Rock, Hinckley, Montgomery, North Aurora, Oswego, Plano, Sugar Grove, and Yorkville.

== Arts and culture ==
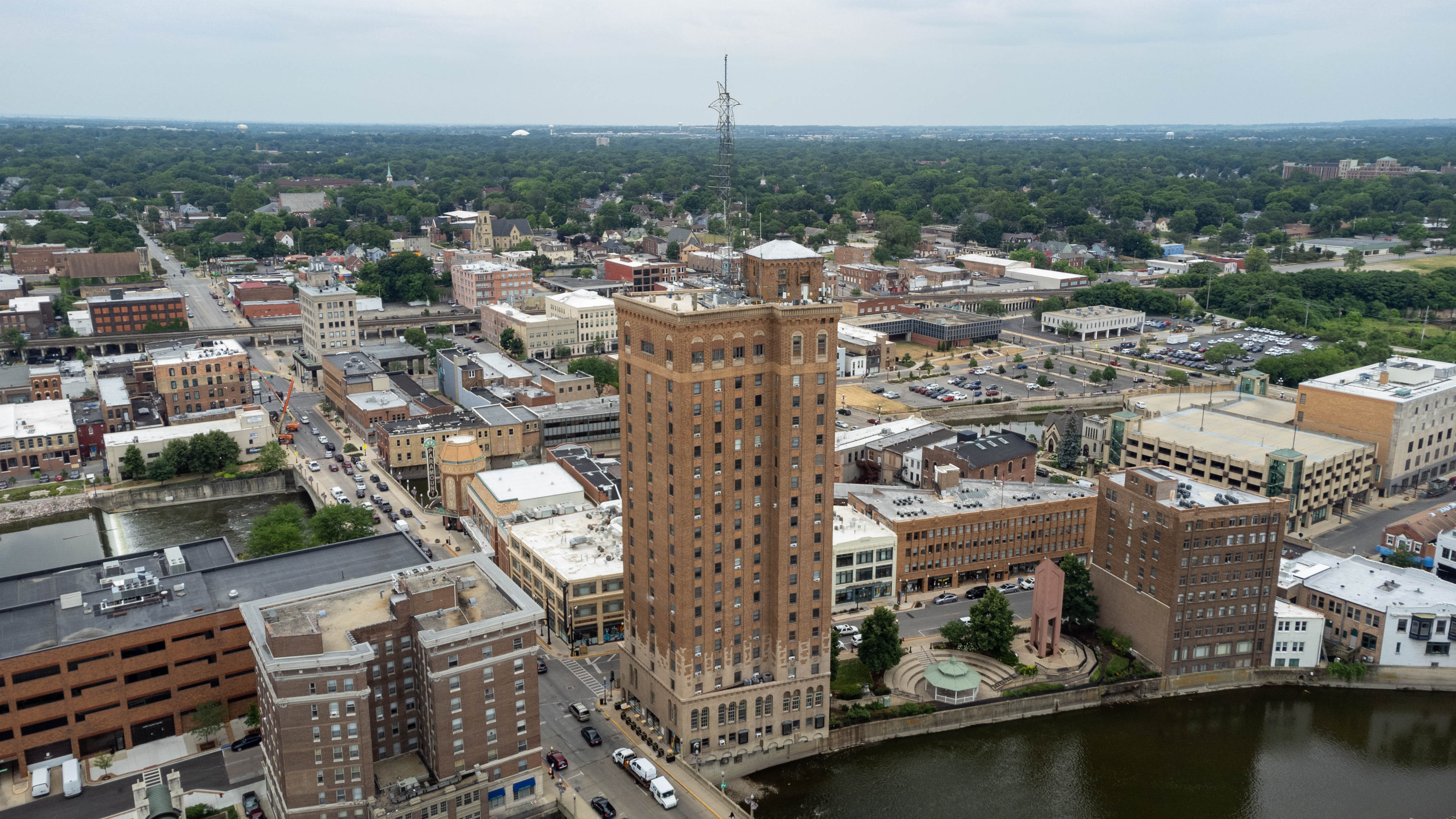
Downtown Aurora with the Leland Tower at center

Downtown Aurora is home to the Paramount Theatre, a large live performance theater on the National Register of Historic Places, and the Hollywood Casino. There is also the Leland Tower, a former hotel that was the tallest building in Illinois outside of Chicago and is on the National Register of Historic Places. The main building of Aurora Public Library and a branch campus of Waubonsee Community College are also located downtown. The Riverfront Playhouse is a not-for-profit theater that has held a storefront location in downtown Aurora since 1978.

Wayne's World (1992) is a comedy film set in Aurora, with characters developed from a skit on the television show Saturday Night Live. One of the writers was from neighboring Naperville, Illinois, and thought Aurora had the appropriate blue-collar feel desired. Most of the movie was filmed elsewhere, but some sections were filmed on location in Aurora. One scene shows the local White Castle. The film's sequel, Wayne's World 2, is also set in Aurora.

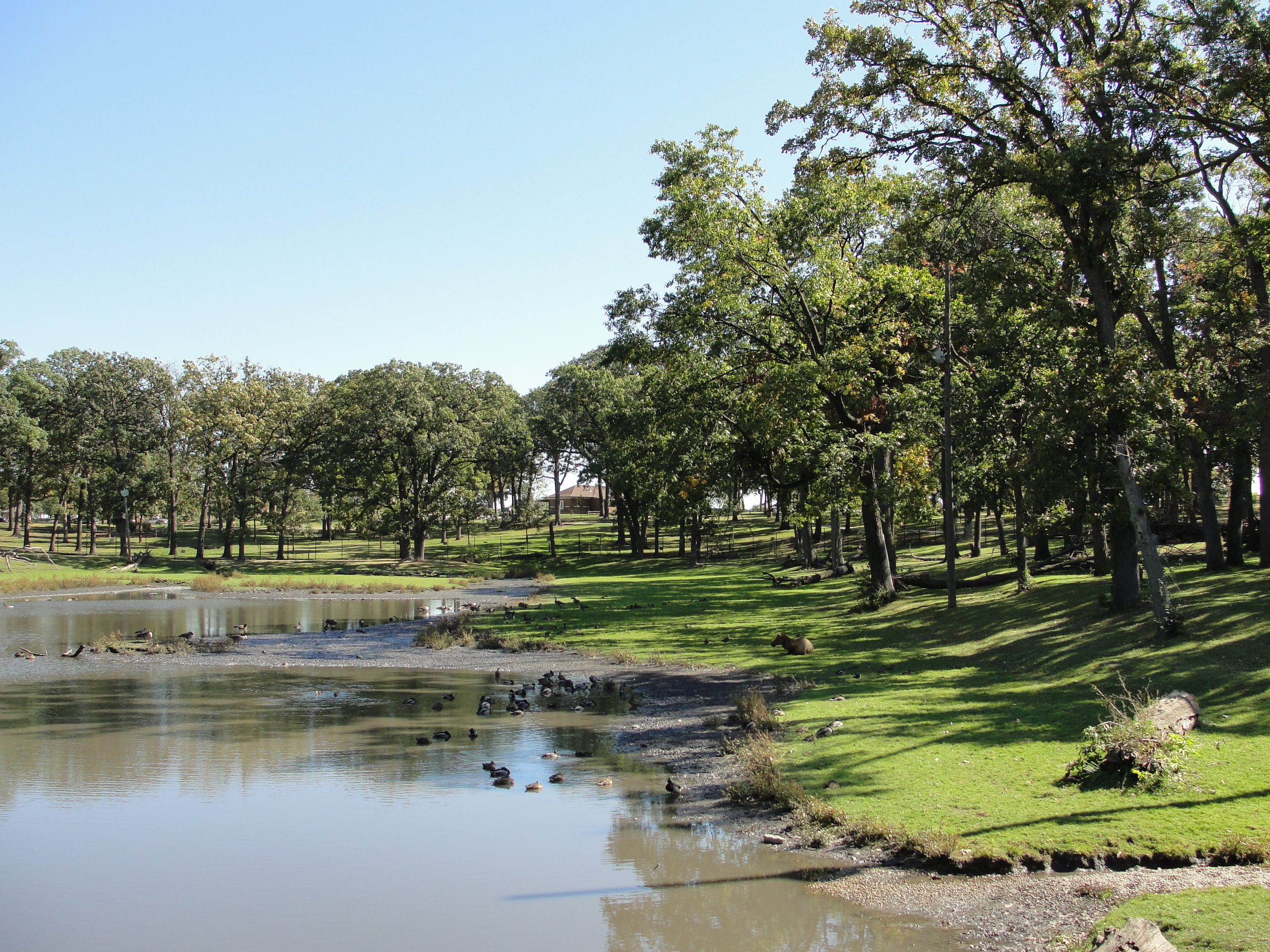
Phillips Park Zoo

Museums and cultural institutions in the city include:

- Aurora Historical Society
- Aurora Regional Fire Museum
- The Aurora Public Arts Commission
- Grand Army of the Republic Hall
- Phillips Park Zoo
- David L. Pierce Art and History Center
- Schingoethe Museum of Native American Culture

=== Architecture ===
Downtown Aurora is well-known for its historic commercial buildings. Commercial structures and hotels on and adjacent to Stolp Island reflect the city's population boom in the early 20th century. The Hotel Arthur on Broadway, the tallest building in the city at the time of its completion, later became the headquarters and traction terminal of the Chicago, Aurora and Elgin Railroad. Designed by Aurora-born architect Eugene Malmer, the building is one of many in the downtown area that has received a residential conversion in the 21st century. Examples of well-preserved residential architecture can be found in the neighborhoods immediately adjacent to the downtown core. These neighborhoods feature buildings in the older, more traditional building styles of the late 18th century (such as Italianate and Queen Anne) as well as 20th century styles such as the Prairie School.

Aurora is also home to a large quantity of pre-fabricated or mail-order houses, such as Sears catalog homes, which are mostly concentrated around New York Street on the West Side. Built from nine different designs, 138 of these mail-order houses have been identified in Aurora, with a majority still extant. Seven Lustron houses, pre-fabricated steel homes, were built in the city from 1949 to 1954.

The Sam and Ruth VanSickle Ford House is located on the city's West Side near Aurora University. Designed by Bruce Goff, the house features prominent elements of the archoitect's signature Organic style, such as Quonset hut-style structural "ribs." Since 1986, it has been occupied by architect and professor Sidney K. Robinson, who has been recognized for his efforts to preserve the home.

==== Prairie School architecture ====
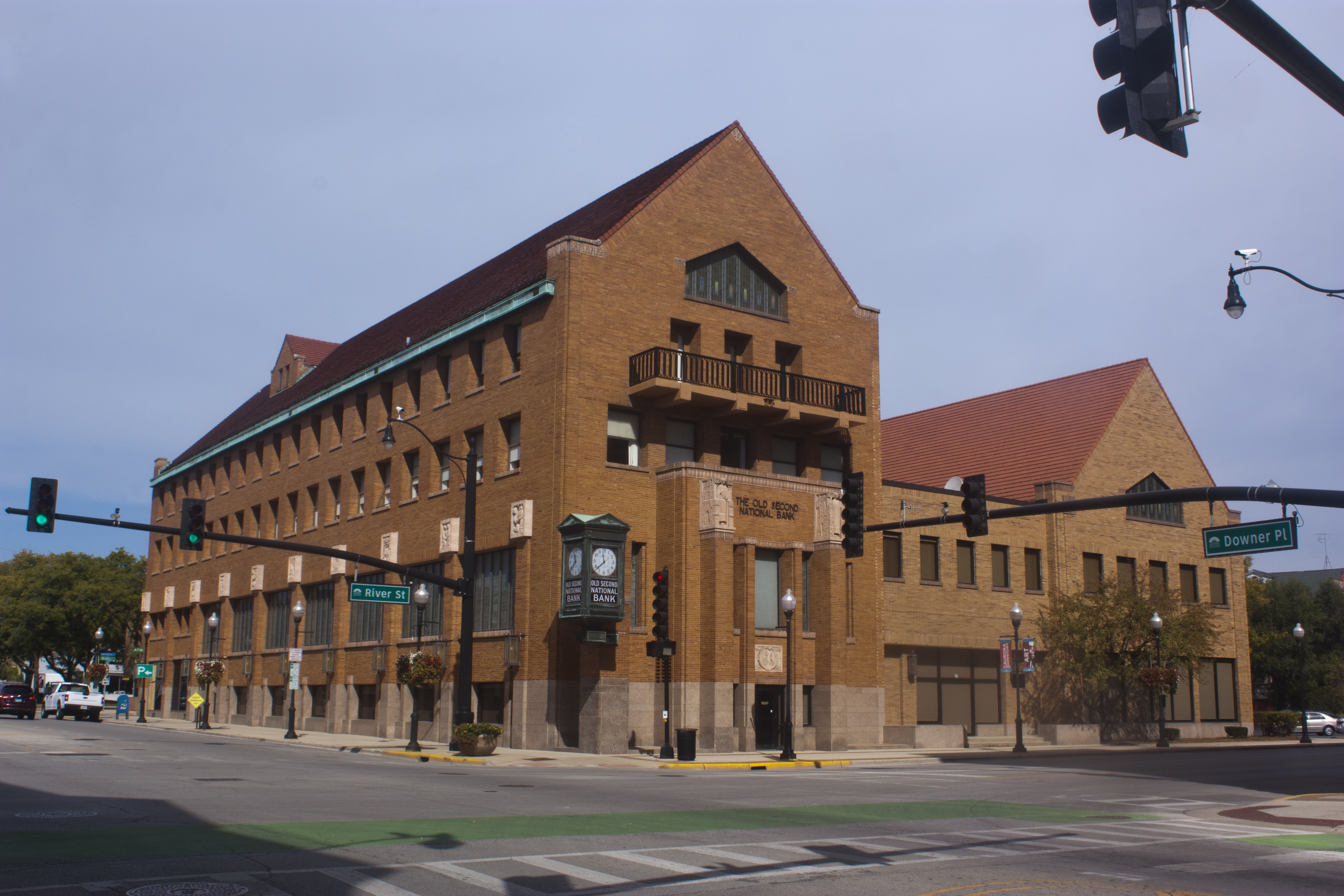
The Old Second National Bank, built in 1924, is one of five buildings by Prairie architect George Grant Elmslie in Aurora.

One of the most prominent architectural styles in Aurora is the Prairie School. Prairie architect George Grant Elmslie designed five buildings in Aurora from 1922 to 1928 (towards the end of his career), including the Keystone and Graham Buildings on Stolp Island. These buildings, along with his Healy Chapel and Old Second National Bank, are relatively uncommon examples of commercial buildings designed in the Prairie style. These buildings all feature Elmslie's signature terracotta ornamentation, mostly in the Prairie Gothic idiom. Frank Lloyd Wright's William B. Greene House, one of the architect's Prairie-style homes, was built in 1912 on Garfield Avenue in the city's West Side. Other examples of Prairie-style residential architecture can be found in the city's Palace Street and Downer Place West Historic Districts.

==== Historic districts ====
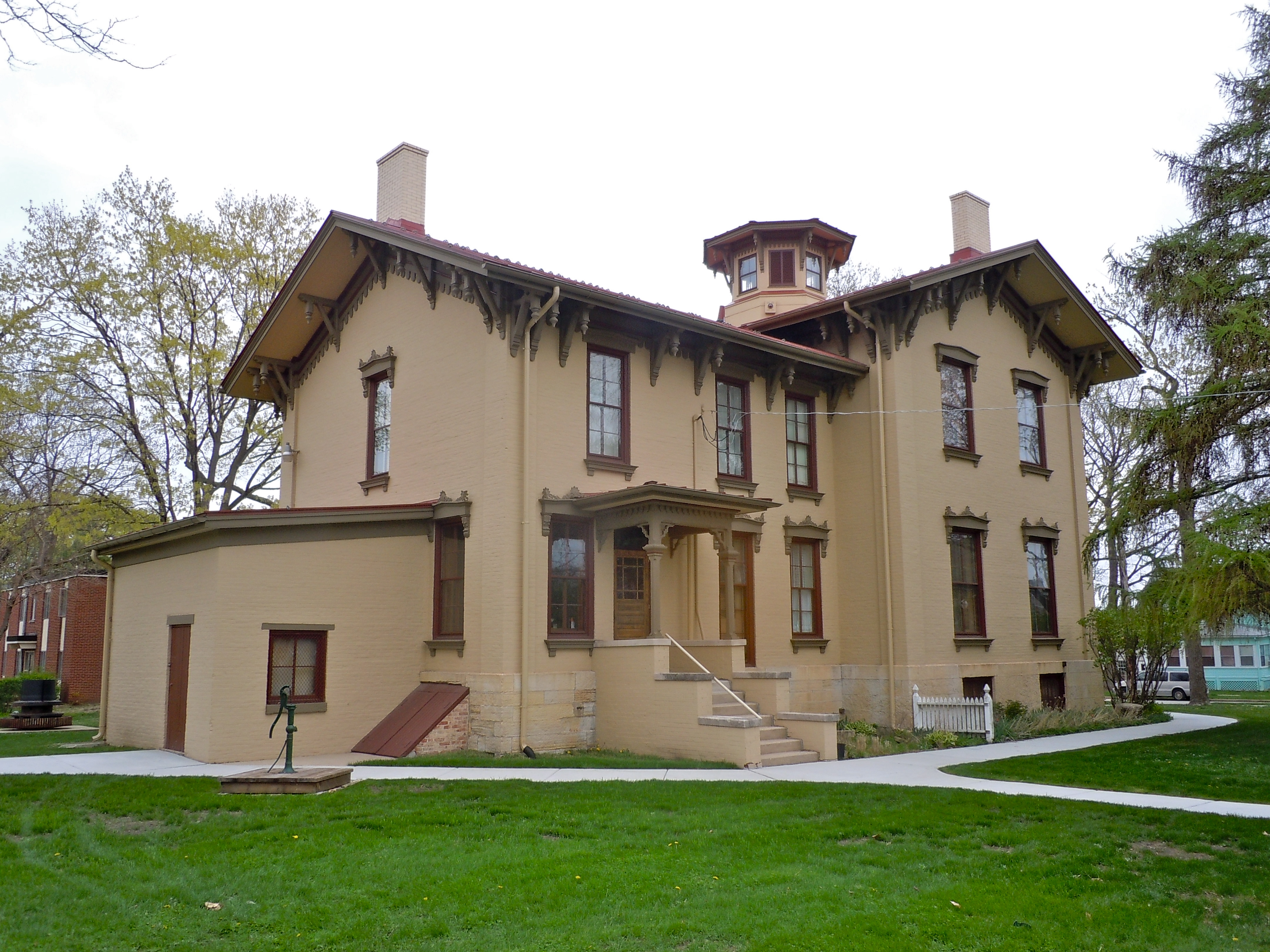
The William A. Tanner House at 304 Oak Avenue in the Tanner Historic District

The city preserves its historic architecture through several historic districts. The Near Eastside Historic District, the city's first, was designated in 1981 and is home to several dozen residences in a variety of Victorian-era styles, ranging from simple Italianate homes to more elaborate Queen Anne style designs. One of the largest historic districts in the city is the Tanner Historic District, established in 1998. It contains 38 listings (mostly residential), including its namesake William A. Tanner House. Built in 1857 for one of the city's earliest residents, it was donated to the Aurora Historical Society in 1936 and now operates as a historic house museum.

Other historic districts commemorate the city's historic commercial architecture, such as the LaSalle Street Auto Row District (which houses historic automobile sales and service buildings and fraternal lodges), and the Stolp Island Historic District (home to much of buildings in the city's downtown core).

=== Commemorative street names ===
Street name	Location
Blues Alley	Stolp Avenue from Galena Boulevard to Downer Place
Dr. William Bonner Avenue	Formerly Pond Street
Dr. Lloyd Hall Memorial Drive	Beach Street from Claim Street to Delius Street
Marie Wilkinson Boulevard	View Street from Illinois Avenue to Plum Street
Pastor Dr. Dezo McGill Avenue	Kane and Loucks Streets
Prentiss Thompson Avenue	Gillette Avenue from Florida and Illinois Avenues
Reverend Oliver Shackleford Jr. Memorial Way	Sumner Avenue from New York Street to Grand Boulevard
Reverend Robert Wesby Avenue	Lincoln Avenue from New York Street to Galena Boulevard
Rich Ebey Avenue	White Avenue from Terry to Hartford
Vernon Louis Parrington Drive	Highland Avenue from Kensington to Galena Boulevard

== Sports and recreation ==
Aurora also has its own zoo, Phillips Park Zoo, located within Phillips Park.

The Stonebridge Country Club, on Aurora's far northeast side, was home to the LPGA Tour's Kellogg-Keebler Classic from 2002 to 2004. Stonebridge also hosted the Ameritech Senior Open from 1991 to 1995 on the Senior PGA Tour.

The Aurora Islanders/Blues/Foxes, a minor league baseball franchise, played from 1910 to 1915 in the Wisconsin-Illinois League. Their most famous player was Casey Stengel, who played one season with the team before being bought by the Brooklyn Dodgers. Stengel batted .352 and was the batting champion of the league for 1911; he also led the league with 50 stolen bases and had 27 outfield assists. The team played in a stadium on the west side in the former Riverview Park. He became known as a manager of baseball teams. Aurora University fields numerous teams that compete in NCAA Division III.

== Government ==
In April 2025, alderman-at-large John Laesch defeated two-term mayor Richard Irvin.

== Education ==
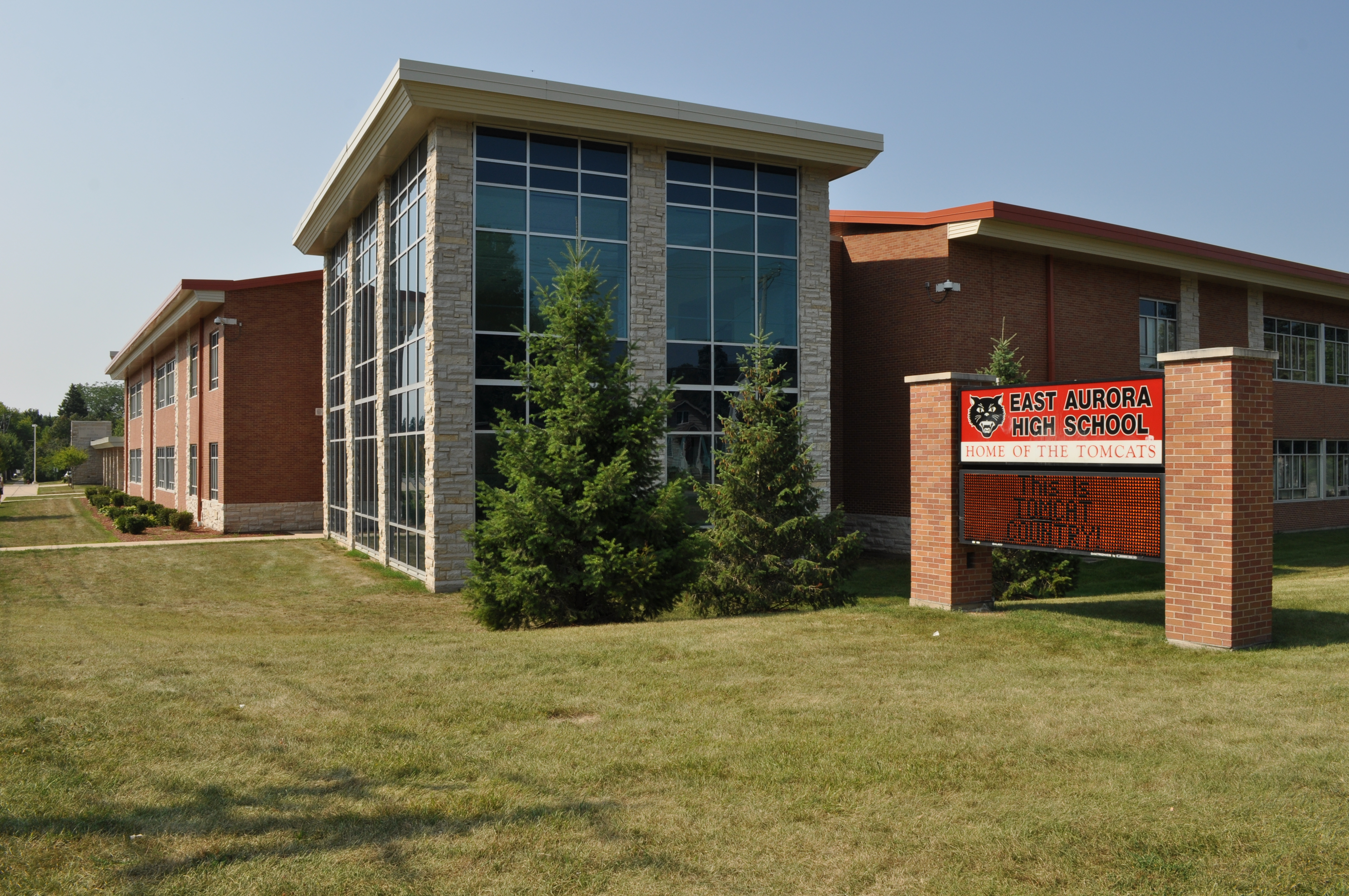
East Aurora High School

The city is home to Aurora University, two branches of Waubonsee Community College, and a branch of Rasmussen College. According to the 2022 Estimates for the American Community Survey, 79.1% of Aurora residents over the age of 24 pursued higher education.

=== Public education ===
Starting in the 1860s, Aurora was served by two main school systems, one on either side of the Fox River, which physically divides the city. In the mid-20th century, the district on the western side of the river expanded to include the students in the village of North Aurora, including the North Aurorans on the east side of the Fox. Additionally, in 1972, the Indian Prairie School District (IPSD) 204 was formed to serve the far eastern portion of Aurora within DuPage County. All three districts (Aurora Public Schools: West Side (District 129), Aurora Public Schools: East Side (District 131) and IPSD) have their headquarters and administrative offices within the Aurora city limits. As of 2005, there were at least forty public schools within Aurora city limits, serving residents of Aurora and neighboring communities.

Due to the city's size, these are not the only three school systems serving residents – some students in the far north end of the city (north of I88 in Kane County) attend Batavia public schools, some on the far southwest side attend Kaneland CUSD 302 schools (headquartered in Maple Park), and some students in the far south end of the city (a small corner of the Kane, Kendall and Will County portions) attend Oswego public schools. Four of the schools in Oswego CUSD 308, Wheatlands Elementary, Homestead Elementary, Wolf's Crossing Elementary, and Bednarcik Junior High are within Aurora's limits.

The Illinois Mathematics and Science Academy (IMSA) is a state-funded residential magnet school for grades 10 to 12. While IMSA operates under public funds (and uses the site originally designated West Aurora High School North Campus), it is managed independently of Aurora's other public schools. Any Illinois student who meets admission requirements may apply to attend IMSA, tuition free. The above-named districts have forty-six public schools within the city limits of Aurora (seventeen for District #131, thirteen for District #129, eleven for District #204, four for Oswego District #308 and the Illinois Mathematics and Science Academy).

Public Schools within Aurora's City Limits
District	Number of Schools
East Aurora School District 131	17
West Aurora School District District 129	13
Indian Prairie School District 204	11
Oswego District #308	4
Illinois Mathematics and Science Academy	1

=== Private education ===
Aurora is also home to other private schools. Within Aurora, there are three Roman Catholic High Schools, Aurora Central Catholic (Diocese of Rockford), Rosary, and Marmion Academy (Order of St. Benedict), and seven Catholic elementary schools operated by the Diocese of Rockford. Along with these three schools is Aurora Christian High School and Elementary School and Resurrection Lutheran School, a Pre-K-8 grade school of the Wisconsin Evangelical Lutheran Synod. Aurora is also home to Fox Valley Montessori School, one of the first Montessori schools established in Illinois in 1969, which offers a preschool and elementary program.

=== Library ===
The Aurora Public Library includes the main library, two branches, an express center, a support facility and a bookmobile. The library operations budget is $10 million and the staff numbers 85 full-time and 89 part-time employees. The library was funded in 1901 through a Carnegie grant. The Santori Public Library, the main library, was opened in June 2015, and offers a 3D printer and a digital media lab in addition to standard book and media services.

== Media ==
In addition to stations from Chicago service the city, the following stations are licensed to Aurora (though they transmit and are based in Chicago unless noted).

=== Television ===
- WXFT-DT – Channel 60, UniMás O&O with Joliet-licensed WGBO-DT (channel 66)
- WPVN-CD – Channel 24, originates various networks
- Aurora Community TV (ACTV) – Local access, cable channel 10
- Total Living Network (TLN) – Regional religious cable channel
- Waubonsee Community College Educational Television – Local access, cable channel 99

=== Radio ===
- WBIG (AM) 1280 Aurora, serves the community and western suburbs
- WERV-FM 95.9 Aurora, serves the community and western suburbs
- WLEY-FM 107.9 Aurora, transmits from Bloomingdale and serves entire market

=== Newspapers ===
The Beacon-News is Aurora's oldest business, first published in 1846, and is part of Tribune Publishing. The newspaper has two editions: the Aurora edition and the Kendall County edition. The Beacon-News has been recognized repeatedly by the Associated Press, Illinois Press Association, Northern Illinois Newspaper Association and the Chicago Headline Club as one of the best daily newspapers in Illinois.

== Transportation ==
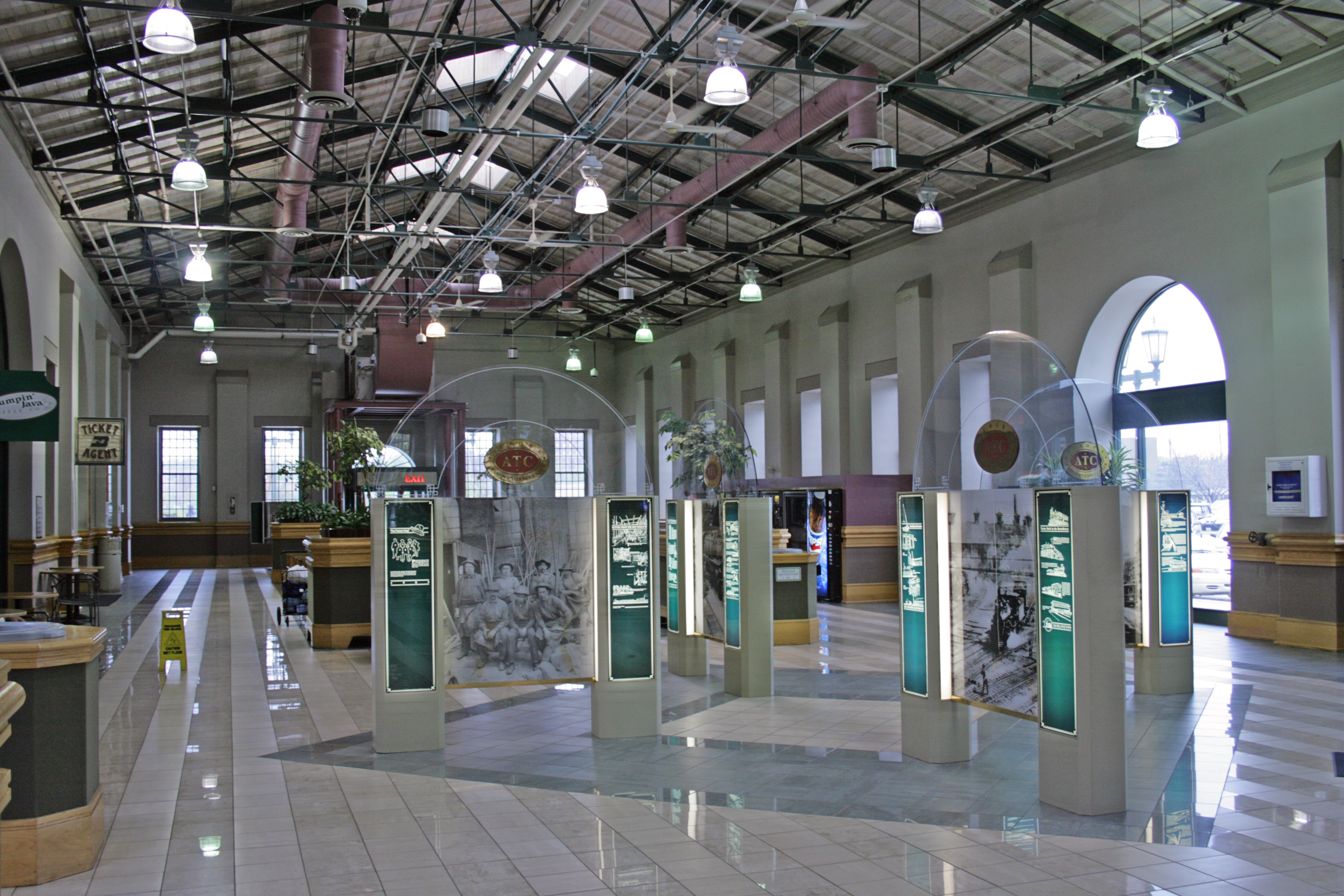
Aurora Transportation Center

Aurora has long been a regional transportation hub. Aurora's transportation system connects its residents and visitors to neighboring towns and cities. The city is served by several major roadways, including Interstate 88 and Illinois Route 59, making it easily accessible by car. Additionally, Aurora offers various public transportation options, including two Metra commuter stops, Pace Bus services, and an expanding bicycle network.

=== Rail ===
The city is the final stop of the Burlington Northern Santa Fe line of the Metra commuter rail system, allowing rail service into Chicago. The city also has a stop at the Rt. 59 station on the BNSF Line. This station is on the border with Naperville and each city maintains a parking lot on their respective side of the tracks. The BNSF Railway owns and maintains a rail yard in Aurora, which they named Eola Yard.

=== Bus ===
Pace Suburban Bus operates local bus service in Aurora six days a week (no service on Sundays) and connects to cities and village such as Naperville, Geneva, Batavia, Oswego, and St. Charles. Pace Bus offers 6 fixed-route bus connections at the Aurora Transportation Center. The City of Aurora also has two Pace On Demand service zones allowing riders to reserve a trip to anywhere within one of the On Demand Zones. Aurora residents within Kane County are eligible to participate in the Ride in Kane transportation program, providing curb to curb bus or taxi service to individuals 65 and older, individuals with a disability, and those with low income.

=== Aviation ===
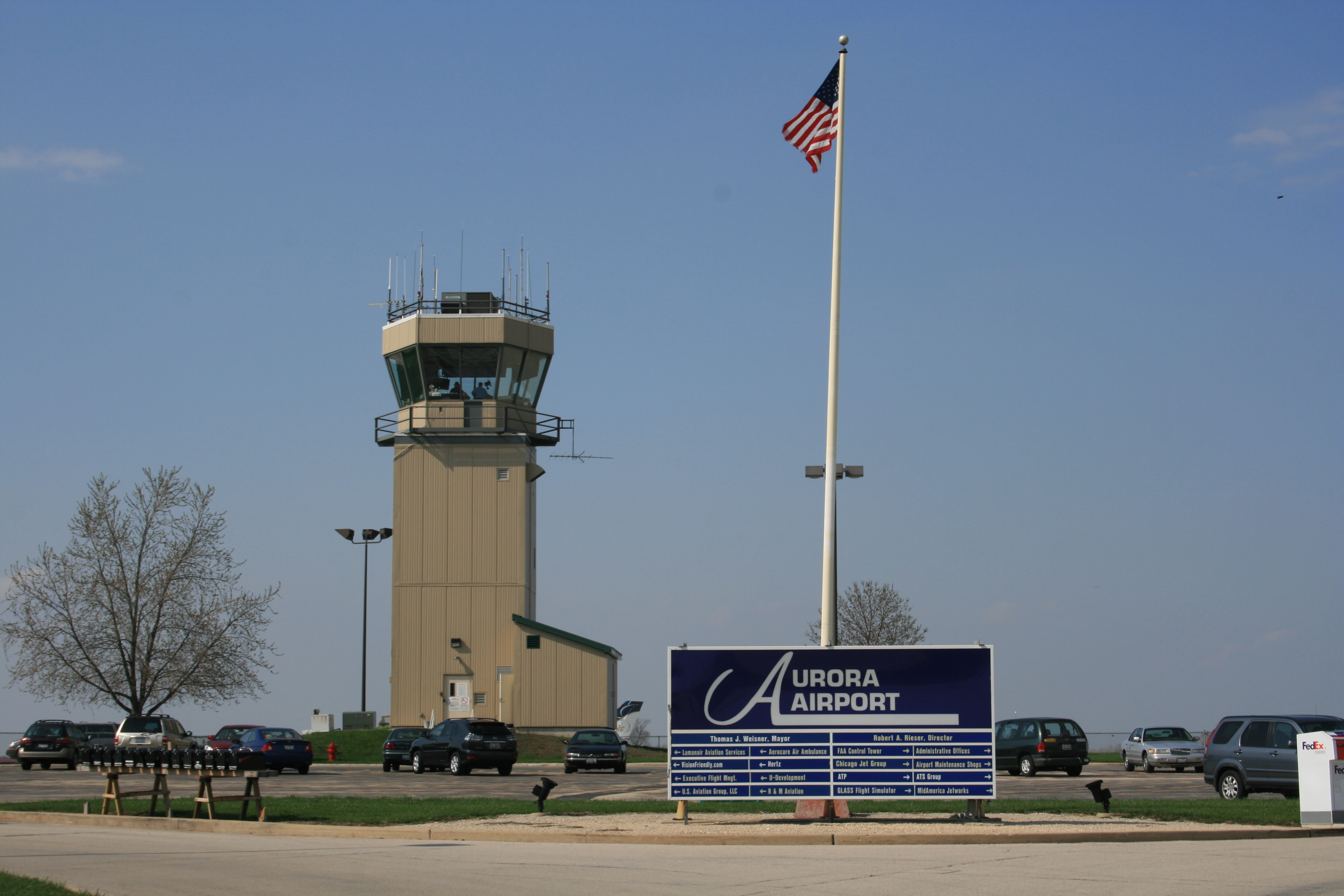
Aurora Municipal Airport

The Aurora Municipal Airport is a general aviation airport in Sugar Grove, Illinois, just outside Aurora. Although the airport is in Sugar Grove, it is owned and operated by the City of Aurora. The Aurora Airport is designed as a reliever airport for Chicago's O'Hare and Midway Airports and also handles a lot of international cargo. It is capable of landing Boeing 757 aircraft. In addition, the Federal Aviation Administration's (FAA) Chicago Air Route Traffic Control Center is on Aurora's west side.

=== Bicycle ===
Aurora aims to be a bicycle-friendly community and promotes bicycling throughout the city. In July 2020, the City of Aurora partnered with Koloni to launch its new Fox Valley Bike Share program. The city has also invested in bike infrastructure improvement projects, further expanding the network of bike lanes and multi-use paths. The completion of a bridge in 2021 over the Fox River in Aurora provides a safe and direct route for bicyclists and pedestrians from the Aurora Transportation Center to the Fox River Trail.

=== Historic transit ===
Aurora does not have a stop for Amtrak trains, as the old station closed in the 1980s. The closest Amtrak station is in Naperville. Aurora City Lines, the old city bus lines, was closed in the late 1980s in favor of regional bus service. Greyhound buses used to stop at the Aurora Transportation Center, but service was discontinued on September 7, 2011. Aurora also had an extensive streetcar system, operated by the Aurora, Elgin and Fox River Electric Company, that operated until 1972. Aurora was served by a number of interurban lines, the most prominent of which was the Chicago Aurora and Elgin Railroad which provided service into Chicago. The STAR Line would have included a third station at Ferry Rd. north of the BNSF Line.

=== Major highways ===
- Interstate 88
- U.S. 30
- U.S. 34
- Lincoln Highway (historic)
- Illinois Route 25
- Illinois Route 31
- Illinois Route 47
- Illinois Route 56
- Illinois Route 59
- Illinois Route 110
- Randall Road
- Orchard Road

== Healthcare ==
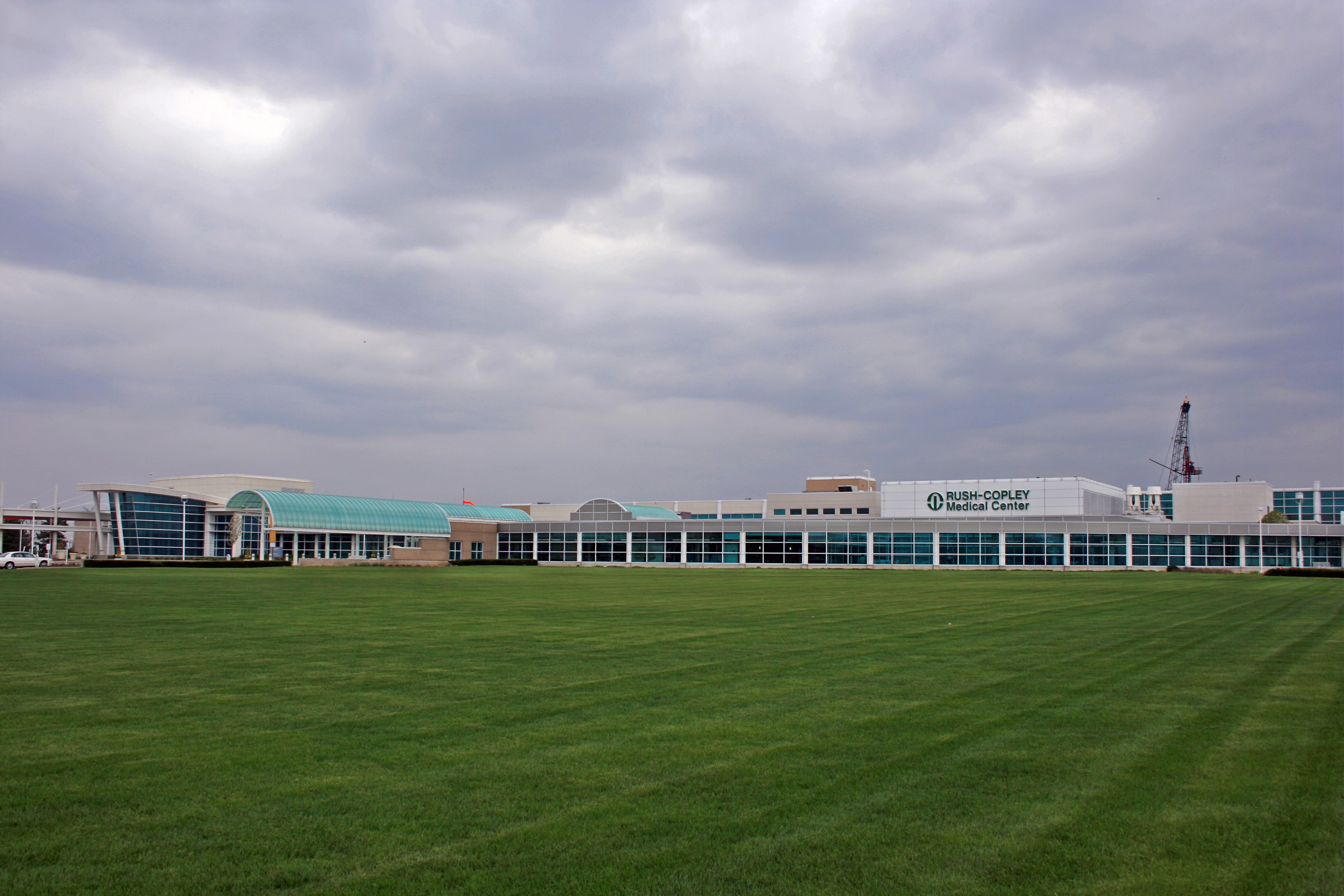
Rush–Copley Medical Center

Aurora has two hospitals, one on the west side, Ascension Mercy Medical Center, and one in Fox Valley, Rush–Copley Medical Center.

== Sister cities ==
- Iguala, Mexico, since 2007
