= 2TM =

Australian AM radio station in New South Wales

TMFM 95.5
- Tamworth, New South Wales; Australia
- Frequency: 95.5 MHz

Programming
- Format: Talkback and Classic hits
- Network: Super Radio Network (AM)

Ownership
- Owner: Broadcast Operations
- Sister stations: 92.9FM

History
- First air date: 27 February 1935
- Former frequencies: 1287 kHz

Technical information
- Class: Commercial

Links
- Website: www.2tm.com.au

TMFM 95.5 (formerly known and still licensed as 2TM) is an Australian commercial radio station based in Tamworth, New South Wales and is part of the Super Radio Network.

The station operates from modern studios that are situated on Goonoo Goonoo Road in Hillvue, a suburb of Tamworth and is situated across the road from the Big Golden Guitar along with sister station, 92.9FM.

On June 16th, 2025, 2TM transitioned permanently to 95.5 FM, as part of the ACMA's AM-FM conversion program, becoming known as 'TMFM 95.5'.

== About ==
The station broadcast on 1287 in the AM band and has been operating in Tamworth since 1935.

In 1940 the 2TM was one of just six stations in New South Wales to become independent following the disbandment of the Broadcast Network.

In 1973 a panel was created by 2TM to recognise and award professional and amateur country artists. This led to the creation of what is known today as the Golden Guitar Awards - officially the Country Music Awards of Australia. The Golden Guitar Awards are held annually at the Tamworth Country Music Festival. 2TM ran the awards until 1992 when it was handed to the Country Music Association of Australia.

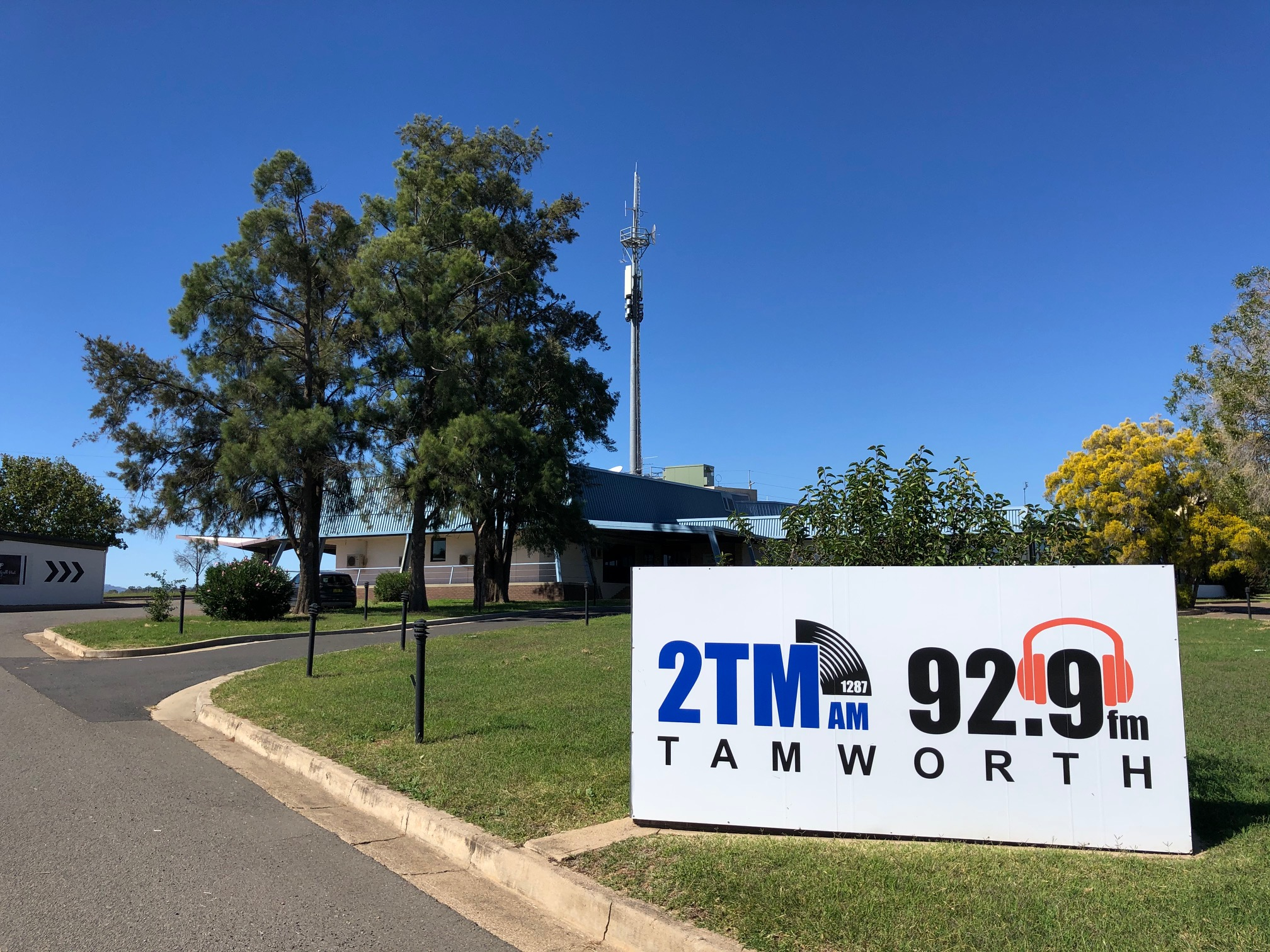
2TM radio station in Tamworth

In 2019 2TM returned to its country roots by introducing live programming of the Tamworth Country Music Festival. The station also reintroduced the Australian country music charts to regular programming the same year. In 2020, 2TM broadcast live from the Tamworth Country Music Awards for the first time.

== Reach ==
2TM's ACMA broadcasting licence area is Tamworth RAI. This is the largest of two area maps that cover Tamworth and reaches an area of13 260 km^{2} . This enables 2TM to reach Tamworth, Gunnedah, Barraba, Manilla, Attunga, Bendemeer, Kootingal, Werris Creek, Quirindi, Murrurundi, Nundle and Curlewis and the villages in between.

== Programming ==
- Talk Overnight With Gary Stewart from 12am to 5am
- Early Mornings with Richard King from 5am
- Breakfast with Sharnae from 6am
- Mornings with Chris Smith from 9am
- The Classic Lunch with Sharnae from 12pm
- Afternoons with Dan from 1pm
- Sportsday from 6pm Monday to Friday
- The Nightline with Cheralyn Darcey from 8pm

Local news with Jon Wolfe airs every hour on weekdays
