= Bill Perryman =

Australian actor

Bill Perryman was an Australian actor with extensive experience in stage and radio. He was the father of Jill Perryman.
