= Brian Howard (radio broadcaster) =

Australian radio broadcaster

Howdy
- Born: Brian Howard; Grafton, New South Wales Australia
- Presenting career
- Show: Breakfast
- Station: Howdy FM
- Time slot: 6:00–9:00 weekdays
- Previous shows: 2SER, 2SM, 2TM
- Website: Howdy FM

Brian "Howdy" Howard is a radio announcer, songwriter and firefighter from Tamworth, New South Wales. In 2006 he was inducted into the Australian Country Music Hall Of Fame and the Broadcasters Hall of Fame.

== Career ==
Howard's radio career began in 1980 with radio 2SER, where he remained until 1988 when he moved to 2TM in Tamworth on the famous Hoedown Radio Network. Howdy hosted breakfast on 88.9FM Tamworth from 2010 to 2026. He subsequently joined Howdy FM, where he presents the daily breakfast show.

Howard is also a musician and singer. His songs have been recorded by many Australian country music recording artists including Gordon Parsons, Glenn Jones, Reg Poole and Christina George.

== Personal life ==
Howard has lived a "double life" working as a firefighter. Howard moved to Sydney, and graduated from Fire Brigade Training College at Paddington. He then worked at Randwick Fire Station from 1971. He became Captain of West Tamworth Fire Station five years after moving to Tamworth in 1988.

== Awards ==
=== Tamworth Songwriters Awards ===
The Tamworth Songwriters Association (TSA) is an annual songwriting contest for original country songs, awarded in January at the Tamworth Country Music Festival. They commenced in 1986.

Year	Nominee / work	Award	Result (wins only)
2013	Brian Howard	Tex Morton Award	awarded
