= 2014 Chicago Air Route Traffic Control Center fire =

Arson at an air traffic control facility in Aurora, Illinois, USA

Coordinates: 41°46′58″N 88°19′52″W

The 2014 Chicago Air Route Traffic Control Center fire was an incident in the United States involving arson at an air traffic control facility in Aurora, Illinois (also known as "Chicago Center"); the incident caused close to 2,000 flights to be grounded. One employee at the facility was treated for smoke inhalation, while 15 to 30 employees were evacuated.

Brian Howard, an employee of Harris Corporation, was charged in the incident. He made a guilty plea in federal court in May 2015, and in September of that year received a prison term of 12 1/2 years.

== Timeline ==
On September 26, at approximately 5:20 am, Brian Howard had gained access to the basement of the Chicago Air Route Traffic Control Center (ARTCC) facility in Aurora, Illinois. Using gasoline-soaked rags, he then started a fire near the computer equipment critical to the facility's operations. This led to a loss of radar services and communications used by controllers to direct air traffic in the Chicago region, and thereby causing an evacuation of the building. Howard then attempted suicide, but was stopped by emergency crews at the scene. By 6 am, a ground stop was implemented at the Chicago O'Hare International Airport as an emergency measure to alleviate traffic loads.

== Aftermath ==
The fire caused substantial damage to the FAA Telecommunications Infrastructure (FTI) system, which allows Chicago Center to digitally share flight data throughout the National Airspace System (NAS). Because of the fire, much of the Chicago traffic that was normally handled by the Center was allocated to nearby Terminal Radar Approach Control (TRACON) facilities; this led to a 200 to 400 percent increase in flights handled by these locations. Because the TRACONs were designed primarily for the lower altitude approach and departure structure of the National Airspace System, the radar and communications capabilities did not extend to the higher altitudes used normally for cruise flight, restricting the remaining flights to lower, less efficient altitudes. Eventually this situation was improved by adjusting radar and communication equipment at the neighboring Centers around Chicago to regain capability. Controllers from Chicago then temporarily relocated to these Centers to aid in traffic control operations until repairs eventually brought the Aurora facility back online on October 13.
