= Zerna Sharp =

American writer

Zerna A. Sharp
- Born: Zerna Addis Sharp; August 12, 1889; Hillisburg, Clinton County, Indiana, United States
- Died: June 17, 1981 (aged 91); Frankfort, Indiana, United States
- Occupations: Editor and educator
- Employer: Scott Foresman
- Known for: Creator of the Dick and Jane series of beginning readers
- Parent(s): Charles and Lottie (Smith) Sharp

Zerna Addas Sharp (August 12, 1889 – June 17, 1981) was an American educator and book editor who is best known as the creator of the Dick and Jane series of beginning readers for elementary school-aged children. Published by Scott, Foresman and Company of Chicago, Illinois, the readers, which described the activities of her fictional siblings, "Dick," "Jane," "Sally," and other characters, were widely used in schools in the United States for nearly forty years. The series, which included such titles as We Look and See, We Come and Go, We Work and Play, and Fun with Dick and Jane, among others, was marketed until 1973 and used the look-say method of teaching reading.

== Early life and education ==
Zerna Addas Sharp was born on August 12, 1889, to Charles and Lottie (Smith) Sharp in Hillisburg, Clinton County, Indiana, and was the eldest of the family's five children. Zerna's father owned a general store in Hillisburg. After graduating from high school she completed a year of teacher training at Marion Normal College (Indiana Wesleyan University) in Marion, Indiana, but never earned a degree, and later attended Columbia University in New York City.

== Career ==
=== Early years ===
Sharp began her career as an educator. She taught first-grade students for nearly a decade at elementary schools in Hillisburg, Kirklin, and La Porte, Indiana. Sharp also served as an elementary school principal.

=== Creator of the Dick and Jane readers ===
Sharp created the characters and concept for the Dick and Jane readers, which were widely used in classrooms in the United States and in some other English-speaking countries—but not in the United Kingdom where home-grown equivalents like Janet and John or Ladybird's Peter and Jane series were read—for nearly four decades before they were replaced with other reading texts. She came up with the idea for the beginning readers for elementary school children while working as a reading consultant and textbook editor for Scott, Foresman and Company, a publisher in Chicago, Illinois.

William Scott Gray (1885–1960), director of the Curriculum Foundation Series at Scott Foresman and dean of the University of Chicago's college of education, hired Sharp to develop the characters for the readers and to combine her approach with his ideas for a process of learning to read. Sharp noted the reduced reading ability of children and urged the development of a new reading format for primers; Gray's research focused on methods to improve reading instruction using content that would be of interest to children and develop their word-recognition skills. Gary and Sharp wanted children who read the books to be able to readily identify with the characters. They also wanted the characters in the stories to participate in typical activities. Before the appearance of the Dick and Jane stories, reading primers "generally included Bible stories or fairy tales with complicated language and few pictures."

Sharp was not the author or illustrator of the texts. As the creator of the Dick and Jane beginning readers, Sharp designed the format and content. She also selected the storylines from ideas that others submitted. Gray co-authored with William H. Elson the Elson Basic Readers (renamed the Elson-Gray Basic Readers in 1936), which Scott Foresman published in Chicago, Illinois. The "Dick" and "Jane" characters, created by Sharp, made their debut in the series in 1930. After the Elson-Gray series ended in 1940, Sharp's characters continued in a subsequent series of primary readers that were better known as the "Dick and Jane" readers.

Sharp worked with Gray to create the characters and primary readers that incorporated his input and used the whole-word or look-say method of word recognition (also called sight reading). The look-say method used a controlled vocabulary and taught readers to memorize the words through repetition, placing limited emphasis on teaching phonics. Teacher guides accompanying the texts also encouraged adoption of the whole-word (look-say) method of identifying the meaning of words from the illustrations and repeating words introduced in the text.

=== Content developer ===
Sharp felt that the watercolor illustrations and texts should work together to provide stories that young readers would relate to and help them learn to read more easily. The text introduced a repetitive pattern of words; the illustrations provided visual reinforcements to help students understand the meaning of the words. Sharp suggested that primers introduce to new readers only one new word on each page and only five new words in each individual story. The Dick and Jane primers adhered to this format.

Sharp worked with illustrator Eleanor B. Campbell, who did most of the illustrations for the Dick and Jane readers, and others to produce and edit the content. In addition, Sharp named the characters in the stories and supervised the layout and illustrations. Sharp, who never married, referred to the two main characters, "Dick" and "Jane," as her children. These names were chosen because they were easy to sound out. To make sure language in the texts were authentic, Sharp also observed children playing and listened to their speech patterns.

The Dick and Jane reading series taught reading as well as American middle-class values to school-aged children. The storylines that Sharp selected described the lives and experiences of a stereotypical American middle-class, white family in a two-parent suburban home that included three children and two pets. "Father" wore a suit, worked in an office, mowed the lawn, and washed the car. "Mother" stayed at home, did housework, and raised the children. "Dick," the oldest of the family's three children, was active and well-behaved. "Jane," the second oldest child, was pretty and carefree. She also helped care for the youngest sibling, a baby sister named "Sally." The family dog was named "Spot;" their cat was named "Puff." The fictional family's suburban home was surrounded with a white picket fence. Because the readers were made for nationwide distribution, the text and illustrations intentionally lacked references to specific regional geography such as mountains, rivers, lakes, plains, or the seashore.

=== Response to criticisms ===
The Dick and Jane readers, which included titles such as We Look and See, We Come and Go, We Work and Play, and Fun with Dick and Jane, among others, monopolized the market for several decades and reached the height of their popularity in the 1950s, when 80 percent of first-grade students in the United States were learning to read though the Dick and Jane stories. However, in the late 1950s and early 1960s, critics of the Dick and Jane readers began to point out its stereotypes; concerns about class, gender, and racial bias; and errors in content and illustrations. Increasing social changes, including the civil rights movement in the 1960s, also made the characters of "Dick and Jane seem increasingly irrelevant to some." Sharp, who was proud of the series and objected to the harsh criticism, replied, "That's all an adult's viewpoint."

== Later years ==
Scott Foresman made changes in their readers in the 1960s in an effort to keep the stories relevant, updating the series every five years. The 1965 edition, the last of the Dick and Jane series, introduced the first African American family as characters in a first-grade reader. The family included two parents and their three children: a son, "Mike," and twin daughters, "Pam" and "Penny." Although the Dick and Jane series of primers continued to be sold until 1973, and were used in some classroom throughout the 1970s, they were replaced with other reading texts and gradually disappeared from use in schools.

In her retirement Sharp traveled and remained active in the education field. She divided her time between California and Indiana, where she established a home in her later years at Frankfort.

== Death and legacy ==
Sharp died at Wesley Manor nursing home in Frankfort, Indiana, on June 17, 1981, at the age of ninety-one. Her remains are interred at a local cemetery.

Sharp's legacy was the Dick and Jane readers of the mid-twentieth century, the successors to the phonics-based McGuffey Readers that were popular from the mid-nineteenth to the mid-twentieth century. In 1967, two years after Scott Foresman retired the Dick and Jane series, the company introduced its Open Highways series, which included heavily illustrated classic children's stories and poems, as well as placing greater emphasis on multicultural content and phonics training in its subsequent readers.

The Dick and Jane primers that Sharp edited, which were well known for their simple narrative text and watercolor illustrations, taught reading to millions of students for four decades. Despite the challenges and criticisms of these readers, their content, and the look-say format they used to teach reading, Sharp's characters of "Dick," "Jane," and "Sally" became household words and the primers became icons of mid-century American culture, as well as collector's items.
