= William S. Gray =

American educator (1885–1960)

William S. Gray (5 June 1885 – 8 September 1960) was an American educator and literacy advocate, who was commonly referred to as "The father of Reading".

== Life and career ==
Gray was born in the town of Coatsburg, Illinois, on June 5, 1885. He graduated from high school in 1904 and began teaching in a one-room school house in Adams County, Illinois. After four years of teaching and being a principal he went to Illinois State Normal University for a two-year teacher training course. His studies were influenced by the North American Herbartian movement that emphasized starting with what the child knows and proceeding with an inductive instructional approach.

Gray proceeded to advance his education at the University of Chicago where he earned a baccalaureate in 1913.

He then spent a year (1913–1914) at Teachers College of Columbia University, the only other teachers' college in the country besides Chicago. There, he came under the influence of Edward Thorndike and Charles Judd, both of whom had been influenced by pragmatists William James and John Dewey. Thorndike and Judd were also among the first to apply the new statistical methods of applied psychology to education, considered the most significant development in the whole history of education in the United States, and would later move their work to Chicago.

At Columbia, Gray "turned toward objective measurement, mathematical precision, a critical attitude, efficiency in schools, diagnosis based on results, and the use of research results which supported the economy of silent reading, and the importance of a sequential program of reading instruction ... the very basis of reading instruction in this country for almost the next half century." At the end of his year in Columbia, he earned a Master of Arts degree and a Teachers College diploma, "Instructor in Education in Normal School."

Gray returned to the University of Chicago to earn a Ph.D. in 1916 for one of the first three doctoral dissertations on reading. His was titled "Studies of Elementary School Reading Through Standardized Tests." Gray's academic career at the University of Chicago lasted from 1916–1945. He served as Director of Research in Reading at the Graduate School of Education, at the University of Chicago and became the first president of the International Reading Association. Jeanne Chall called him "the acknowledged leader of, and spokesman for, reading experts for four decades." During his lifetime, he was known as one of the most influential persons and researchers in the field. His contemporaries included Arthur Irving Gates (1890–1972); Ernest Horn (1882–1967); and Ruth Strang (1896–1971).

In 1929, Gray began his affiliation with the publisher Scott Foresman. He co-authored with William H. Elson the Elson Basic Readers (renamed the Elson-Gray Basic Readers in 1936) and served as director of the Curriculum Foundation Series at Scott Foresman. Gray also worked with Zerna Sharp, a reading consultant and textbook editor for Scott Foresman, on reading texts for elementary school children. Sharp developed the characters of "Dick," "Jane," and "Sally" (and their pets, "Spot" and "Puff") and edited the series of books that became known as the Dick and Jane readers. Gray authored and Eleanor B. Campbell did most of the illustrations for the early readers. The characters of "Dick" and "Jane" made their debut in the Elson-Gray readers in 1930, reached the height of their popularity in the 1950s, and continued to appear in subsequent primers until the series was retired in 1965. By the late 1970s and early 1980s, after teaching millions of Americans how to read, the Dick and Jane readers were replaced with other reading texts and gradually disappeared from use in schools. Today, the "Dick," "Jane," and "Sally" characters have become icons of mid-century American culture for many from the baby boom generation and the books have become collector's items.

Gray's study of worldwide literacy for UNESCO took four years of research and resulted in the book, The teaching of reading and writing: An international survey. Gray was the leading expert on reading in the first half of the 20th century. He promoted the whole word method of teaching reading supported by attention to context, configuration, structural and graphophonemic cues. Educators like Helen Huus found Gray's method comprehensive, because first children memorized a few words by sight, then developed the sight-word correspondence by using these known words as reference points.

Gray was also author of over 500 studies, reviews, articles, and books on reading and instruction, including On Their Own in Reading: How to Give Children Independence in Analyzing New Words. He was Reading Director of the Curriculum Foundation Series Scott, Foresman & Company.

In 1935, Gray teamed up with Bernice Leary of St. Xavier College, Chicago, to publish their landmark work in readability, What Makes a Book Readable. It attempted to discover what makes a book readable for adults of limited reading ability.

== The Adult Literacy Survey ==
The first part of the study consisted of a literacy survey of adults between 15 and 50, one of the first survey of adult civilians in the U.S.

The sample consisted of 1,690 adults from a variety of institutions and areas around the country. The testing consisted of two parts. The first used a number of fiction and non-fiction passages taken from magazines, books, and newspapers. The second part used the Monroe Standardized Reading Test, which gave the results in grade scores.

The results showed a mean grade score of 7.81. This meant that the adults tested were able to read with an average proficiency equal to that of pupils in the eighth month of the seventh grade. Some 44 percent reached or surpassed the reading level of eighth-grade students of the elementary school.

About one-third fell in grades 2 to 6, another third from 7 to 12, and the remainder from 13 to 17. These results roughly mark the elementary, secondary, and college levels.

The authors stressed that half the adult population is lacking suitable materials written at their level. “For them,” they wrote, “the enriching values of reading are denied, unless materials reflecting adult interests be adapted to meet their needs.”

One third of the population needs materials written at the 4th, 5th, and 6th-grade levels. The poorest readers—one sixth of the adult population—need “still simpler materials for use in promoting functioning literacy and in establishing fundamental reading habits”. (p. 95)

The criterion used by Gray and Leary included 48 selections of about 100 words each, half of them fiction, taken from the books, magazines, and newspapers most widely read by adults. They established the difficulty of these selections by a reading-comprehension test given to about 800 adults designed to test their ability to get the main idea of the passage.

== The readability variables ==
The second part of What Makes a Book Readable was an extensive examination of the elements of writing style that affects readability (reading ease). Until the studies of John Bormuth in the 1970s, no one studied readability so thoroughly or investigated so many style elements or the relationships between them. The authors first identified 289 elements that affect readability and grouped them under these four headings:

1. Content
2. Style
3. Format
4. Features of Organization

The authors found that content, with a slight margin over style, was most important. Third in importance was format, and almost equal to it, “features of organization,” referring to the chapters, sections, headings, and paragraphs that show the relationship of ideas. (p. 31)

They found they could not measure content, format, or organization statistically, though many would later try. While not ignoring the other three causes, Gray and Leary concentrated on 82 variables of style, 64 of which they could reliably count. They gave several tests to about a thousand people. Each test included several passages and questions to show how well the subjects understood them.

Having a measure, now, of the difficulty of each passage, they were able to see what style variables changed as the passage got harder. They used correlation coefficients to show those relationships.

Of the 64 countable variables related to reading difficulty, those with correlations of .35 or above were the following (p. 115):

Elements with correlations ≥ .35
Number	Description	Correlation	Notes
1	Average sentence length in words	−.52	a negative correlation, that is, the longer the sentence the more difficult it is
2	Percentage of easy words	.52	the larger the number of easy words the easier the material
3	Number of words not known to 90% of sixth-grade students	−.51
4	Number of "easy" words	.51
5	Number of different "hard" words	−.50
6	Minimum syllabic sentence length	−.49
7	Number of explicit sentences	.48
8	Number of first, second, and third-person pronouns	.48
9	Maximum syllabic sentence length	−.47
10	Average sentence length in syllables	−.47
11	Percentage of monosyllables	.43
12	Number of sentences per paragraph	.43
13	Percentage of different words not known to 90% of sixth-grade students	−.40
14	Number of simple sentences	.39
15	Percentage of different words	−.38
16	Percentage of polysyllables	−.38
17	Number of prepositional phrases	−.35

Although none of the variables studied had a higher correlation than .52, the authors knew by combining variables, they could reach higher levels of correlation. Because combining variables that were tightly related to each other did not raise the correlation coefficient, they needed to find which elements were highly predictive but not related to each other.

Gray and Leary used five of the above variables, numbers 1, 5, 8, 15, and 17, to create a formula, which has a correlation of .645 with reading-difficulty scores. An important characteristic of readability formulas is that one that uses more variables may be only minutely more accurate but much more difficult to measure and apply. Later formulas that use fewer variables may have higher correlations (pp. 137–139).

Gray and Leary's work stimulated an enormous effort to find the perfect formula, using different combinations of the style variables. In 1954, Klare and Buck listed 25 formulas for children and another 14 for adult readers. By 1981, George Klare noted there were over 200 published formulas.

Research eventually established that the two variables commonly used in readability formulas–a semantic (meaning) measure such as difficulty of vocabulary and a syntactic (sentence structure) measure such as average sentence length—are the best predictors of textual difficulty.

== Sources ==
- Lauritzen, C. (2007). William Scott Gray (1885–1960): Mr. Reading. In Susan E. Israel and E. Jennifer Monaghan (Eds.), Shaping the reading field: The impact of early reading pioneers, scientific research, and progressive ideas. Newark, DE: International Reading Association. pp. 307–326.
- Stevensen, Jennifer A., ed. 1985. William S. Gray: Teacher, Scholar, Leader. Newark, Delaware: International Reading Association.
