= Childress =

Childress (/ˈtʃɪldrɪs/ CHIL-driss) may refer to:

== People ==
- Alice Childress (1916–1994), American playwright and author
- Alvin Childress, American actor
- Bam Childress, American football player
- Bob Childress (1890–1956), American Presbyterian minister
- Brad Childress, American football coach
- David Hatcher Childress, a writer on alternative archeology
- Dimeco Childress, American basketball player
- Elizabeth Childress, American socialite and civic leader
- Frank Childress, American rapper, known professionally as Comethazine
- Fred Childress (born 1966), Canadian football league player
- George Childress, lawyer, statesman and principal author of the Texas Declaration of Independence
- John Childress (d. 1819), U.S. marshal and Tennessee businessman
- James Childress (1773–1836), American land speculator and plantation owner
- James Childress, American philosopher and theologian
- Jimmy Childress, American football coach
- Joe Childress (1933–1986), American NFL player
- Josh Childress, American basketball player
- Kallie Flynn Childress, American actress
- Mark B. Childress, American ambassador
- Mark Childress, American novelist
- Nina Childress (born 1961), French-American artist
- O. J. Childress, American football player
- Patricia Childress (born 1971), American actress
- Paul Childress, American powerlifter
- Randolph Childress, American basketball player
- Ray Childress, American football player
- Richard Childress, American NASCAR driver and entrepreneur
- Rob Childress, American college baseball coach
- Robert Childress, American artist and illustrator of "Dick and Jane"
- Rocky Childress (born 1962), American baseball player
- Ross Childress, American musician
- Sarah Childress Polk (1803–1891), U.S. First Lady from 1845 to 1849
- William Childress (1933–2022), American author
- Zion Childress (born 2002), American football player

== Places ==
- Childress, Texas
- Childress County, Texas
- Childress, Montgomery County, Virginia
- Childress, Goochland County, Virginia

== See also ==
- Alice Childress (song)
