= Aurora Township, Illinois =

Aurora Township
- Township
- Location in Kane County

- Kane County's location in Illinois
- Coordinates: 41°46′07″N 088°19′08″W
- Country: United States
- State: Illinois
- County: Kane
- Established: November 6, 1849

Area
  - Total: 35.32 sq mi (91.5 km^{2})
  - Land: 34.54 sq mi (89.5 km^{2})
  - Water: 0.78 sq mi (2.0 km^{2}) 2.20%
- Elevation: 690 ft (210 m)

Population (2020)
  - Total: 126,929
  - Density: 3,675/sq mi (1,419/km^{2})
- ZIP Codes: 60502, 60503, 60504, 60505, 60506, 60510, 60538, 60542
- FIPS code: 17-089-03025
- GNIS feature ID: 0428621
- Website: auroratownship.org

Aurora Township is located in Kane County, Illinois. It is divided by the Fox River. As of the 2020 census, its population was 126,929 and it contained 44,416 housing units.

== Geography ==
According to the 2021 census gazetteer files, Aurora Township has a total area of 35.32 square miles (91.48 km^{2}), of which 34.54 square miles (89.46 km^{2}) (or 97.80%) is land and 0.78 square miles (2.02 km^{2}) (or 2.20%) is water.

=== Cities, towns, villages ===
- Batavia (southern edge)
- Aurora (majority)
- Montgomery (top half)
- North Aurora (majority)

=== Unincorporated Towns ===
- Marywood at 41.793674°N 88.286224°W
- Scraper-Moecherville at 41.741135°N 88.273178°W
- South Park at 41.73322°N 88.29877°W

== Demographics ==
As of the 2020 census there were 126,929 people, 47,924 households, and 33,289 families residing in the township. The population density was 3,593.89 inhabitants per square mile (1,387.61/km^{2}). There were 44,416 housing units at an average density of 1,257.60 per square mile (485.56/km^{2}). The racial makeup of the township was 36.46% White, 9.99% African American, 2.31% Native American, 2.51% Asian, 0.06% Pacific Islander, 30.15% from other races, and 18.52% from two or more races. Hispanic or Latino of any race were 58.67% of the population.

There were 47,924 households, out of which 40.30% had children under the age of 18 living with them, 45.69% were married couples living together, 16.47% had a female householder with no spouse present, and 30.54% were non-families. 24.80% of all households were made up of individuals, and 10.60% had someone living alone who was 65 years of age or older. The average household size was 3.04 and the average family size was 3.65.

The township's age distribution consisted of 27.5% under the age of 18, 10.7% from 18 to 24, 28.4% from 25 to 44, 21.7% from 45 to 64, and 11.6% who were 65 years of age or older. The median age was 33.6 years. For every 100 females, there were 99.9 males. For every 100 females age 18 and over, there were 97.2 males.

The median income for a household in the township was $60,618, and the median income for a family was $64,947. Males had a median income of $35,225 versus $26,656 for females. The per capita income for the township was $25,549. About 10.6% of families and 13.0% of the population were below the poverty line, including 18.7% of those under age 18 and 9.6% of those age 65 or over.

Historical population
Census	Pop.	Note	%±
2000	115,553		—
2010	146,149		26.5%
2020	126,929		−13.2%
U.S. Decennial Census

== School districts ==
- East Aurora Public School District 131
- West Aurora Public School District 129
- Batavia Public School District 101

== Government ==
The Town Hall is located at 80 N. Broadway, Aurora, Illinois. The Township is led by an elected Supervisor and four Trustees. An Assessor, Clerk and Highway Commissioner are also elected.

The township is responsible for road maintenance, staffing a Youth and Community Center, and operating a handicapped accessible Ride-In-Kane transportation system.
