= Mabel O'Donnell =

Children's book author

Mabel O'Donnell (1890–1985) was an author of popular children's literature, mostly basal readers that helped young readers build stamina and endurance. O'Donnell is best known for the Alice and Jerry and Janet and John series. Books by O'Donnell sold more than 100 million copies around the world.

== Early life ==
O'Donnell, was born in Aurora, Illinois and attended schools in East Aurora Public School District 131. She graduated from East Aurora High School, then attended the University of Chicago and Columbia University. She returned to Aurora, and served as a teacher, primary supervisor (principal) and curriculum coordinator in the East Aurora School District. In 1946 she resigned to become an editor for Row, Peterson and Company whom she had been writing for since the late 1930s (see "Life as an Author")

In 1965, the East Aurora School District named an elementary school on Reckinger Road after O'Donnell.

== Life as an author ==
In 1938, O'Donnell began her activities as an author while still a primary grade supervisor and curriculum coordinator by writing a series of books for young readers. These books known as "The "Alice and Jerry Books" were published by Row, Peterson and Company, an Evanston-based textbook publishing firm became part of HarperCollins. In all, there were more than 20 books published in "The Alice and Jerry Books" series.

In 1949, O'Donnell worked on the Janet and John series, an Anglicisation of her Alice and John books. The books continued to be updated through the years, with different character names and slight modifications in the plots. The stories were illustrated by Florence and Margaret Hoopes.

O'Donnell also worked on scholarly reading research, including Prevention and Correction of Reading Difficulties with Emmett Albert Betts.

== Books by Mabel O'Donnell ==
Happy Days, Here and There, Rides and Slides, Skip Along, Under the Sky, Open the Door, High on a Hill, Day In and Day Out, The Wishing Well, Round About, Anything Can Happen, Down the River Road, Friendly Village, Through The Green Gate, If I Were Going, Five-and-a-Half Club, Singing Wheels, Engine Whistles, Runaway Home, It Happened One Day, It Must Be Magic, After the Sun Sets

(Some of these books were later updated, with "The New" added to the front of the book titles.)
