= Aurora Public Schools =

Aurora Public Schools may refer to:

- Aurora Public Schools (Colorado)
- East Aurora Public School District 131, Aurora, Illinois
- West Aurora Public School District 129, Aurora, Illinois
