= Dolch word list =

List of frequently used English words

The Dolch word list is a list of frequently used English words (also known as sight words), compiled by Edward William Dolch, a major proponent of the "whole-word" method of beginning reading instruction. The list was first published in a journal article in 1936 and then published in his book Problems in Reading in 1948.

Dolch compiled the list based on children's books of his era, which is why nouns such as "kitty" and "Santa Claus" appear on the list instead of more current high-frequency words. The list contains 220 "service words" that Dolch thought should be easily recognized in order to achieve reading fluency in the English language. The compilation excludes nouns, which comprise a separate 95-word list. According to Dolch, between 50% and 75% of all words used in schoolbooks, library books, newspapers, and magazines are a part of the Dolch basic sight word vocabulary; however, bear in mind that he compiled this list in 1936.

== Critics ==
Critics of teaching reading using whole word and whole language methods (and proponents of phonics) maintain that memorizing whole words may do more harm than good because it takes time away from the important aspect of practicing basic decoding techniques.

Cognitive neuroscientist Stanislas Dehaene writes "cognitive psychology directly refutes any notion of teaching via a 'global' or 'whole language' method." He goes on to talk about "the myth of whole-word reading" (also: sight words), saying it has been refuted by recent experiments. "We do not recognize a printed word through a holistic grasping of its contours, because our brain breaks it down into letters and graphemes." Cognitive neuroscientist Mark Seidenberg says "the persistence of the whole language ideas despite the mass of evidence against them is most striking at this point", and goes on to describe it as a "theoretical zombie" because it persists in spite of a lack of supporting evidence. In addition, according to research, whole-word memorisation is "labor-intensive", requiring on average about 35 trials per word.

== Teaching strategies ==
These lists of words are still assigned for memorization in elementary schools in America and elsewhere. Although most of the 220 Dolch words are phonetic, children are sometimes told that they can't be "sounded out" using common sound-to-letter phonics patterns and have to be learned by sight; hence the alternative term, "sight word". The list is divided according to the educational stage in which it was intended that children would memorize these words.

Some educators say the Dolch list can be useful if teachers do not teach children to memorize them; instead, they teach the words by using an explicit, systematic phonics approach, perhaps by using a tool such as Elkonin boxes.

Some educators prefer to use the 1000 Instant Word list prepared in 1979 by Edward Fry, professor of Education and Director of the Reading Center at Rutgers University and Loyola University in Los Angeles.

== Dolch list: Non-nouns ==
Pre-primer: (40 words) a, and, away, big, blue, can, come, down, find, for, funny, go, help, here, I, in, is, it, jump, little, look, make, me, my, not, one, play, red, run, said, see, the, three, to, two, up, we, where, yellow, you

Primer: (52 words) all, am, are, at, ate, be, black, brown, but, came, did, do, eat, four, get, good, have, he, into, like, must, new, no, now, on, our, out, please, pretty, ran, ride, saw, say, she, so, soon, that, there, they, this, too, under, want, was, well, went, what, white, who, will, with, yes

1st Grade: (41 words) after, again, an, any, as, ask, by, could, every, fly, from, give, going, had, has, her, him, his, how, just, know, let, live, may, of, old, once, open, over, put, round, some, stop, take, thank, them, then, think, walk, were, when

2nd Grade: (47 words) always, around, because, been, before, best, both, buy, call, cold, does, don't, fast, first, five, found, gave, goes, green, its, left, made, many, off, or, pull, read, right, sing, sit, sleep, tell, their, these, those, upon, us, use, very, wash, which, why, wish, work, would, write, your

3rd Grade: (41 words) about, better, bring, carry, clean, cut, done, draw, drink, eight, fall, far, full, got, grow, hold, hot, hurt, if, keep, kind, laugh, light, long, much, myself, never, only, own, pick, seven, shall, show, six, small, start, ten, today, together, try, warm

== Dolch list: Nouns ==
(97 words) apple, baby, back, ball, bear, bed, bell, bird, birthday, boat, box, boy, bread, brother, cake, car, cat, chair, chicken, children, Christmas, coat, corn, cow, day, dog, doll, door, duck, egg, eye, farm, farmer, father, feet, fire, fish, floor, flower, game, garden, girl, goat, grass, ground, hand, head, hill, home, horse, house, kitty, leg, letter, man, men, milk, money, morning, mother, name, nest, night, paper, party, picture, pig, rabbit, rain, ring, robin, Santa Claus, school, seed, sheep, shoe, sister, snow, song, squirrel, stick, street, sun, table, thing, time, top, toy, tree, watch, water, way, wind, window, woman, women, wood

== See also ==
- General Service List
- Learning to read
- Most common words in English
- Phonics
- Reading education
- Sight word
- Swadesh list
- Synthetic phonics
- Teaching reading
- Word wall
