= East Aurora High School =

High school in Kane County, Illinois

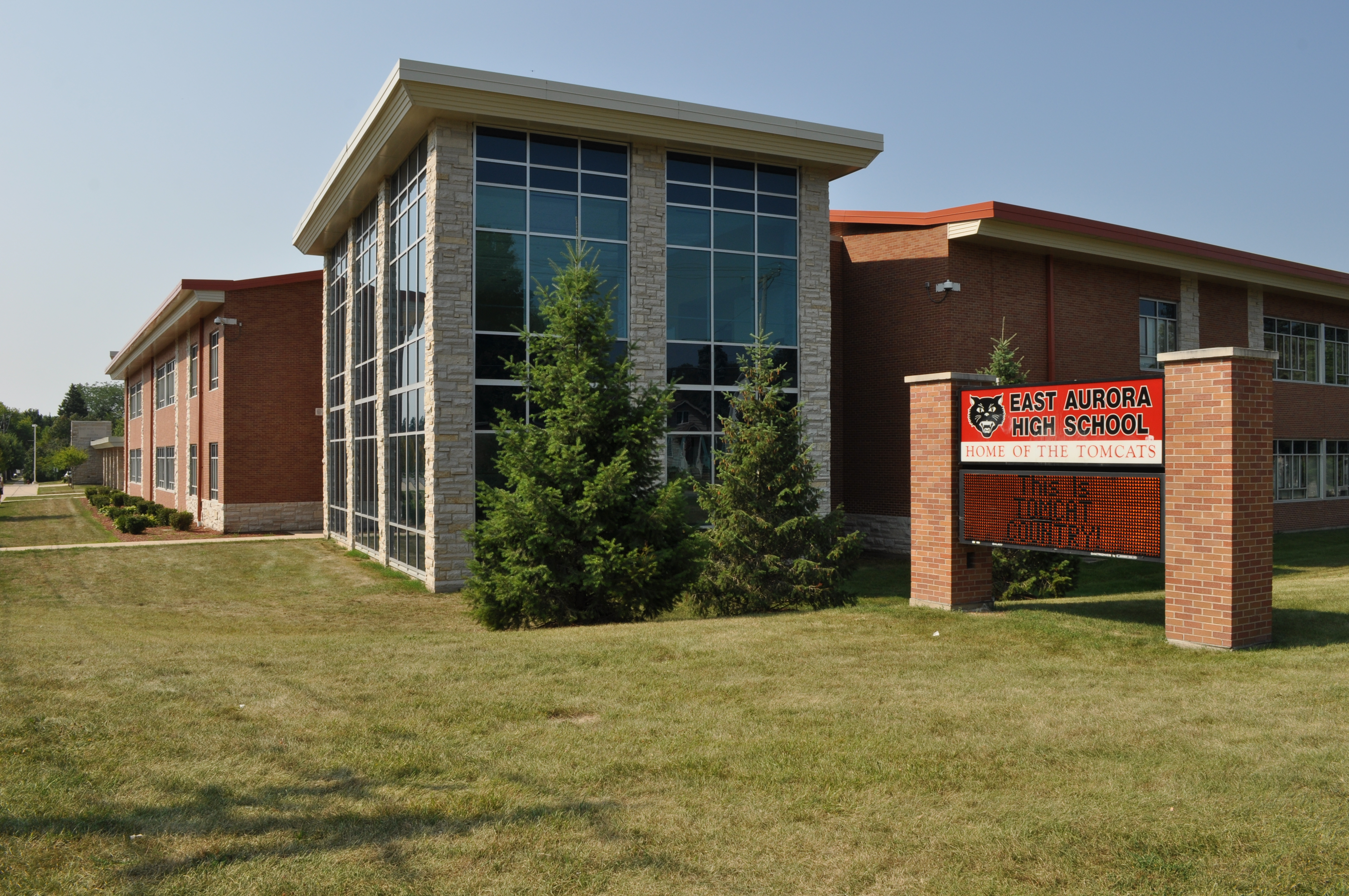

Location
- 500 Tomcat Lane; Aurora, Illinois 60505; United States

Information
- School type: Public high school
- Opened: 1867; 159 years ago (1957 current building)
- School district: East Aurora Public School District 131
- Principal: Jennifer Mitchell
- Teaching staff: 214.00 (FTE)
- Grades: 9–12
- Gender: coed
- Enrollment: 4,019 (2023-2024)
- Student to teacher ratio: 18.78
- Campus: suburban
- Colors: Red; Black
- Fight song: "Wave the Flag"
- Athletics conference: Upstate Eight Conference
- Nickname: Tomcats
- Newspaper: The Auroran
- Yearbook: Speculum
- Website: easthigh.d131.org//

East Aurora High School, (also known as EAHS or Aurora East High School), is a public, four-year high school located in Kane County, at the corner of Smith Boulevard and Fifth Avenue in Aurora, Illinois, a western suburb of Chicago, Illinois. It is the only high school in East Aurora Public School District 131.

== History ==
According to "The Educational History of Illinois", private subscription schools were taught by various teachers on the East Side of Aurora starting in 1834. The first class from East Aurora High School - four girls - graduated in 1867. The first high school was built on Center Street, and torn down in the 1960s.

In August 1912, East Aurora High School opened a new, larger building on Jackson Street. The dedication ceremony was attended by the U.S. Commissioner of Education and Illinois Schools Superintendent Francis G. Blair. The total cost of the structure was $225,000, including $25,000 to buy the land. That building is now K.D. Waldo Middle School.

The present East Aurora High School campus opened in 1957. The address for East Aurora High School is 500 Tomcat Lane, in Aurora, IL. Additions were made to the new high school sometime after 1989 school year, adding three stories to the East side of the school for math, science and English. Previous to 1989 there were three stories however a new addition was not put on until after 1988. The new addition is now the freshman classrooms, gym and cafeteria. Currently, construction is being done on the west side of the campus, where the Roy E. Davis stadium will replace the original field.

== Tomcats nickname ==
Through the 1920s, the East High teams did not have an official mascot or nickname. The teams were often referred to as the “Red and Blacks", “East Warriors” or simply “East High”. But by 1934, the high school yearbook referred to the football team as the “Tomcats”. By 1945, all the high school teams had adopted the name. An article in the September 30, 1931, East High Auroran hints that the name was in honor of legendary varsity football coach Glen Thompson, who was known more often as “Tommy”. Thompson had come to East Aurora High School in 1925, and proceeded to resurrect the football team. He was a successful basketball and track coach, and his football teams regularly won conference championships. For decades, the high school teams have been known as the Tomcats and nearly all the East Aurora middle and elementary schools use some sort of cat for their logo and nickname.

== Academics ==
There are Honors and Advanced Placement classes offered in one or more of the following subjects: foreign language, math, science, language arts, social studies and fine arts.

According to the 2012 Illinois State report card, East Aurora had an average composite ACT score of 16.6 and graduated 60.1 percent of its senior class. The average class size is 22.8 students. East Aurora has not made Adequate Yearly Progress on the Prairie State Achievement Examination, a state test part of the No Child Left Behind Act.

The staff is 178 teachers, of whom 60 percent hold an advanced degree. Approximately 250 semester courses by eight major departments are taught at East Aurora.

== Athletics ==
East Aurora has 23 athletic teams - 11 for boys and 12 for girls - which compete in the Upstate Eight Conference and Illinois High School Association. East Aurora's mascot is the Tomcat. Teams include football, tennis, badminton, baseball, softball, bowling, cross country, volleyball, track and field, basketball, soccer and cheerleading.

The following East Aurora teams have finished in the top four of an IHSA-sponsored state tournament or meet:

- Basketball (Boys): 4th Place (1969); 3rd Place (1972)
- Basketball (Girls): 4th Place (1982)
- Debate: 3rd Place (1966)
- Track and Field (Boys): State champions (1898)
- Wrestling (Boys): 3rd Place (1964)

The rivalry between the East Aurora and West Aurora High School football teams is considered the oldest football rivalry in the state, and the sixth-oldest in the nation. The teams first met on November 18, 1893. East High won the game 28-0. By 1895, the game was drawing 2,000 fans to Hurd's Island, the neutral area of the Fox River where the two teams played. The game was not played in 1894 or 1897, but the teams met twice in 1896 and 1898. Through 1951, the teams traditionally played on Thanksgiving Day.

The 1938 Tomcats football team is considered the school's best ever. That year, the team went 9-0, and outscored opponents 188-6. West High was the only team to score against East that year.

== Activities ==
East Aurora offers dozens of opportunities to participate in extracurricular activities. Activities include art club, book club, card club, chess club, conservation club, computer gaming club, cooking club, drama, film club, guitar club, heavy metal club, key club, literary magazine, mathletes, music club, National Honor Society, photography, Peace Jam, Scholastic Bowl, student council, Speculum (yearbook), The Auroran (school paper),

The school also offers a wide spectrum of clubs and organizations, including: Literary Magazine, NHS (National Honor Society), GHS (German Honor Society), Music Club, Art Club, FCCLA and DECA.

== NJROTC ==
Navy JROTC Insignia

East Aurora is well known for its involvement in the Navy Junior Reserve Officers' Training Corps, or NJROTC. The high school has more than 900 students enrolled in the program, making East Aurora largest in the nation.

East Aurora's NJROTC has been the Area 3-West Champions for the past several years. East Aurora has gone to Navy Nationals held in NAS Pensacola, Florida, for the past seven years. East Aurora has won many honors including, Distinguished Unit and 2006 National Color Guard Champions. The East Aurora NJROTC Rifle Team has also had successful years traveling and competing in Colorado, Tennessee and Ohio.

== Notable alumni ==
- Kurt Becker, class of 1977, former NFL offensive lineman; former head football coach at East Aurora High School
- Ryan Boatright, class of 2011, professional basketball player
- Charles Pierce Burton, class of 1880, author of the "Bob's Hill" young adult books
- Linda Chapa LaVia, class of 1984, member of Illinois House of Representatives, representing 83rd District since 2003
- James Compton, class of 1954, president of the Chicago Urban League 1978-2006
- Slade Cutter, class of 1929, recipient of four Navy Crosses for sinking second-most Japanese ships in World War II; All-American football player at U.S. Naval Academy
- Michael J. Davis, class of 1965, Senior U.S. District Judge for the District of Minnesota
- Christine Estabrook, class of 1968; actress
- Henry Gale, class of 1892, astrophysicist and author
- Ralph Galloway, former CFL offensive lineman
- Lloyd Hall, prominent African-American chemist who contributed to science of food preservation
- Frank Hanny, former NFL tight end
- Tom Kivisto, businessman who founded SemGroup and played on two University of Kansas Final Four teams
- Bob Lavoy, former NBA power forward
- Patricia Reid Lindner, class of 1957, member of Illinois House of Representatives, representing 50th District from 1993-2009
- Aaron McGhee, former professional basketball player
- Olive Beaupré Miller (née Olive Kennon Beaupré), class of 1900, author and publisher of children's literature
- Mabel O'Donnell, class of 1906, author of Alice and Jerry basal reader series
- Frank R. Reid, class of 1898, attorney and member of U.S. House of Representatives
- Wilfred Reilly, Kentucky State University professor and well-known writer
- John Rennicke, former NBA guard
- Andy Sabados, former NFL offensive lineman
- John F Sarwark, class of 1972, head of orthopaedic surgery at Lurie Children's Hospital
- Roy Solfisburg, class of 1903, Illinois State Supreme Court Chief Justice from 1962–63, 1967-1969
- Robert Strotz, class of 1938, Professor of Econometrics and President of Northwestern University, 1970-1984; also Chairman of the Board of Directors of the Federal Reserve Bank of Chicago
- Jay Taylor, former professional basketball player
- Carl Thomas, R&B singer, recording artist
- Charlotte Thompson Reid, class of 1930, U.S. Representative from 1962 to 1971
- Walter Truemper, Medal of Honor recipient for heroic actions in World War II
- Frank Wickhorst, class of 1915, college football player and coach, member of the College Football Hall of Fame
