= Sabados =

Sabados is a surname. Notable people with the surname include:

- Andy Sabados (1916–2004), American football player
- Steven Sabados (born 1965), Canadian television show host
