= Hillisburg, Indiana =

Hillisburg
- Unincorporated community and Census-designated place
- Location within Clinton County, Indiana
- Coordinates: 40°17′10″N 86°20′23″W
- Country: United States
- State: Indiana
- County: Clinton
- Township: Johnson
- Named for: John E. Hillis
- Elevation: 919 ft (280 m)
- ZIP code: 46041
- FIPS code: 18-33826
- GNIS feature ID: 2830343

Hillisburg is an unincorporated community in Johnson Township, Clinton County, Indiana.

== History ==
Hillisburg was laid out in 1874 by John Etherton Hillis (1840–1904), a local businessman and financier, and by 1886 had two general stores, two drug stores, a blacksmith shop, a saw mill, a grist mill and a grain elevator. In the early 1900s it was also home to the Hillisburg Bank, two churches (Christian and Methodist Episcopal) and Masonic Lodge #550.

The Hillisburg post office was discontinued in 1992.

== Demographics ==
The United States Census Bureau delineated Hillisburg as a census designated place in the 2022 American Community Survey.

== Notable person ==
- Zerna Sharp, co-author of the Dick and Jane readers
