= Alice and Jerry =

Series of children's early reading books

Alice and Jerry was a basal reader educational series published and used in classrooms from the mid-1930s to the 1960s. The books sold nearly 100 million copies worldwide. This series competed at the time with the Dick and Jane educational series.

Both the Alice & Jerry series and the competing Dick & Jane series of textbooks were designed to be taught using the "Look and Say" method, rather than being taught using a Phonics-centric teaching method.

As of 2024, the series was still in print.

== Book summaries ==
The "Alice and Jerry" books followed a sister and brother, Alice and Jerry, as well as their dog Jip, through a series of simple events in relatively plain settings. The "Alice and Jerry" series followed patterns similar to the Dick and Jane readers, which are now better known in the United States. The sentences in the "Alice and Jerry" readers were short, and used repeating words to build reader's stamina and familiarity. For instance, here is the text from the book "Skip Along": "One, two three. Come and see. Come and see. See my umbrella. Look, Jerry. Up. // One, two three. Come and see. Come and see. See my airplane. Up, up, up. Down."

== Book titles ==
- Pre-Primers: "Here and There", "Rides and Slides", "Skip Along", "Under the Sky", "Open the Door", "High on a Hill", "Day In and Day Out"
- First-grade primers: "The Wishing Well", "Round About", "Anything Can Happen"
- Second-grade readers: "Down the River Road", "Friendly Village", "Neighbors On The Hill"
- Third-grade readers: "Through The Green Gate", "If I Were Going", "Five-and-a-Half Club"
- Fourth-grade readers: "Singing Wheels"
- Fifth-grade readers: "Engine Whistles"
- Sixth-grade readers: "Runaway Home"
- Wonder story books: "It Happened One Day", "It Must Be Magic", "After the Sun Sets"

Some of these books were later updated, with "The New" added to the front of the book titles.

== Publishing history ==
The "Alice and Jerry" books were published by Row, Peterson and Company, which later became part of HarperCollins. Nearly all the books were written by Mabel O'Donnell, who also wrote an Anglicisation of the series, named Janet and John. O'Donnell was a teacher, supervisor and curriculum coordinator for elementary schools in East Aurora Public School District 131. Most of the books were illustrated by Florence and Margaret Hoopes. Both series were widely used in the United States and other English-speaking countries. The books were often sold as a set that a classroom might use for a reading curriculum.

== See also ==
- Dick and Jane
- Ant and Bee
- Janet and John
- Peter and Jane
