= Arther Trace =

American author and educator (1922–2005)

Arther Storrey Trace Jr.
- Born: January 6, 1922; Denver, Colorado
- Died: July 18, 2005 (aged 83); Fayetteville, Arkansas
- Occupations: Author, educator, educational critic and reformer

Arther Storrey Trace Jr. (Denver, 6 January 1922 – Fayetteville, Arkansas, July 18, 2005) was an author, educator, educational critic and reformer, and academic professor. Trace was best known as the author of What Ivan Knows that Johnny Doesn't (1961), published by Random House during the Sputnik era, at the height of the Cold War with the Soviet Union. In this book, he sought to upend the then commonly held opinion that although the United States seemed to lag behind the Soviet Union in the teaching of science and mathematics, it was superior in the teaching of the humanities.

== Professional life ==
Trace's book What Ivan Knows that Johnny Doesn't offered its readers a comparison of American and Soviet public school textbooks adopted in these two countries at the time, and the comparison was not favorable to the American education system. Directed to a popular audience, Trace's book, together with a book published previously by Rudolf Flesch called Why Johnny Can't Read (1955), spurred an immediate public interest and national debate surrounding perceived inadequacies of educational methods then being used in the American public education system in the teaching of reading, history, literature, foreign languages, and geography. According to Trace, textbooks used in the United States public schools to teach reading and the humanities were constrained by the theory that children would learn better and more easily with controlled and repetitive content and, in the teaching of reading, a limited vocabulary focused mainly on familiar life-adjustment themes common in American suburban life, rather than truly literary content that provokes thought and encourages imagination beyond everyday life. Thus, Trace felt that very little good literature was offered in these textbooks. Moreover, much less challenging content in the teaching of history, foreign languages, and geography eventually became the norm. According to Trace, textbooks in the Soviet Union, by contrast—although fettered by communist ideology—did not limit vocabulary or content but offered a more common-sense approach to educational content with rich and imaginative literary fare, including stories by Tolstoy and Gogol even in the lower grades, as well as substantial, challenging, and informative subject matter in ancient and modern history, modern languages, and geography in all levels of learning.

What Ivan Knows that Johnny Doesn't was widely reviewed throughout the country, including in feature articles in the Saturday Evening Post, The New York Times, Time, the Cleveland Plain Dealer, and Family Digest. Trace also appeared in several media venues, including numerous local radio shows around the country, as well as a major national talk show, Howard K. Smith: News and Comment (February 14, 1962), in which he appeared with Edward R. Murrow on the show's debut.

Not surprisingly, the books by Flesch and Trace, as well as Trace's subsequent book Reading Without Dick and Jane (1965), rankled the educational establishment, which responded in various critical reviews and journal articles, defending the schools and the training received by teachers in colleges of education around the country and criticizing other aspects of Soviet education besides its textbooks. Yet, as a result of the revelations outlined in Flesch's and Trace's books, despite the controversy they sparked, some Americans (as evidenced in the numerous reviews in newspapers and magazines of What Ivan Knows that Johnny Doesn't) became fearful of the inadequacies of the public schools and their curriculum. Concern grew that educational outcomes could be seriously compromised, possibly jeopardizing the cultural status of the United States and even its national security during the Cold War era.

In Reading Without Dick and Jane, Trace investigated in further detail the methods of teaching reading in public schools at the time, making the case, as did Flesch, for the superiority of the phonics method—based on knowing how letters and letter combinations typically sound—over the then widely adopted "look-say" method (or, as Trace called it, the "look-guess" method), which relies on raw memorization of how words look. Trace pointed out that reading experts increasingly discarded the phonics method and approved of a reading method that exerted more control over vocabulary and slowed down the pace of content in order to make reading easier and more accessible to students. Like Flesch, Trace believed that the phonics approach allowed students to discover for themselves any new words they encountered and thus to build their arsenal of vocabulary and spelling skills easily and rapidly. Trace felt, therefore, that the then-famous and heavily used Dick and Jane series of readers—usually taught through the look-say method—seemed to foster what he deemed to be a mystifyingly illogical and deliberate holding back of learning possibilities.

In an attempt to counter such disturbing trends, as he saw them, he edited in 1963-64 a series of elementary school readers published by Open Court Publishing Company. In them he hoped to offer students a wide selection of imaginative stories, tales about other countries, poems by famous poets, and information essays that he felt could challenge students and that also offered new knowledge and interesting insights about the world. Although these basal readers were adopted by numerous schools (mostly private) around the country and found some success, they ultimately failed to thrive amid criticism among educators that they were too difficult for students.

During the 1960s, Trace served as a member of the national Reading Reform Foundation as well as the Council for Basic Education. He was also active in the lecture circuit giving addresses at numerous schools and PTA groups around the country.

Although Trace was most well known as an educator and education critic/reformer in his day, he also authored several other books on a wide variety of topics that interested him, including Russian literature, the teaching of foreign languages, the future of literature, the history of Christianity, and famous world historical figures.

== Personal life ==
Arther Trace was born in Denver, Colorado, in 1922. He earned a bachelor's degree in English at the University of Denver and then served in the army during World War II. After the war, he attended graduate school at Columbia University, receiving a master's degree in English. In 1949 he married Gladys Pickett. At the time he was an instructor at the University of Nebraska. After moving to Palo Alto, California with his family, he received a Ph.D. in literature at Stanford University in 1954. After earning his doctorate, Trace became an English instructor at Purdue University and shortly afterwards was hired as an English professor at John Carroll University in Cleveland, Ohio, where he taught Renaissance and Russian literature for thirty-five years and published his most well-known books. In 1992, Trace retired and with his wife moved to Fayetteville, Arkansas. There he authored and revised several more books. He died in Fayetteville in 2005 at age eighty-three.

== Books and articles ==
=== Books ===
- Preparatory Reading for Writing, co-written with Thomas J. Phillips (1956) Houghton Mifflin.
- What Ivan Knows that Johnny Doesn't (1961) Random House.
- Reading Without Dick and Jane (1965) Regnery.
- The American Moral Crisis (1969) Exposition.
- The Future of Literature (1972) Phaedra.
- Christianity and the Intellectuals (1982) Sherwood Sugden, & Co.—Later retitled Christianity: Its Rise and Fall (2000) XLibris.
- Furnace of Doubt: Dostoevsky and the Brothers Karamazov (1988) Sherwood Sugden, & Co.—Later retitled Dostoevsky and the Brothers Karamazov (2000) XLibris.
- Literature: Its Opponents and Its Power (1997) University Press of America.
- The Millennium: Its 500 Most Famous People (2000) XLibris.
- Women of the Last Millennium (2000) XLibris.
- Paradise Lost for Children (2000) XLibris.

=== Articles ===
- "The New Look in Foreign Language Instruction: Threat and Promise," The Modern Language Journal (43) 8: 382-386 (December 1959).
- "The Literary Limbo in American Schools," The University Bookman 3 (2): 27-34 (Winter 1961).
- "The Revolt Against Dick and Jane," Ohioana (9) 4: 95-96 (Winter 1966).

== Additional sources ==
- Strezikozin, V. "Why Does Ivan Know More than Johnny?" Soviet Education, 5 (2): 59-63 (1962).
- Wolhuter, C. C. and Corene de Wet, "The Worldwide Expansion of Education since the Middle of the Twentieth Century: Reconstruction and Assessment," © Kamla-Raj 2015. Journal of Social Sciences, 43(2): 107 (2015).
- Hopkins, Elaine, "Literature in the Schools of the Soviet Union," Comparative Education, 10 (1): 26 (March 1974).
- Noah, Harold J., "The Use and Abuse of Comparative Education," Comparative Education Review, 550-562 (Nov. 1984)
- Lindberg, Lucille "Educating Ivan and Johnny," The Journal of Teacher Education, 13 (1): 104
