= Elizabeth Rider Montgomery =

- Elizabeth Rider Montgomery Julesberg
- Born: July 12, 1902; Huaras, Peru
- Died: February 19, 1985 (aged 82); Seattle, Washington, U.S.
- Occupations: Children's writer, textbook writer, and playwright
- Writing career
- Notable work: Dick and Jane Basic Readers

Elizabeth Rider Montgomery (July 12, 1902 – February 19, 1985), also known as Elizabeth Julesberg, was an American writer of children's books, educational texts, and plays. She is most renowned as the co-author of Dick and Jane Basic Readers, a series of successful first-grade reading programs used by 80 percent of U.S. first-graders in the 20th century. She wrote over 70 books throughout her career (nearly 50 years). These included children's biographies of Chief Seattle, Henry Ford, and Walt Disney, the Story Behind... nonfiction series, and the adult novel The Builder Also Grows (1977).

== Early life ==
Montgomery was born in Huaras, Peru, July 12, 1902, where her father, Charles Quantrell Rider, was working as a missionary. At age 5, her father abandoned the family and she was largely raised by her mother, Lulla Tralle Rider. The family then relocated to Independence, Missouri, where Montgomery attended area schools.

In 1925 she began her education at Washington State Normal School in Bellingham, Washington. She was trained as a teacher and she went on to teach young children in Washington and in Los Angeles. This experience as a teacher inspired her work in children's writing.

In 1930, Montgomery married Norman A. Montgomery. They had a daughter, Janet, and divorced in 1961. In 1963, Montgomery married Arthur Julesberg, a machinist. In her personal life, she was Elizabeth Julesberg, but she kept publishing as Elizabeth Rider Montgomery. She spent most of her adult life in Seattle, Washington.

== Scott Foresman and the Dick and Jane readers ==
In 1936, Montgomery sent three stories to Scott Foresman and Company without being asked to do so. The publisher loved her work so much that he offered her a contract. She was an employee of the company by 1938 and later became a staff writer.

At Scott Foresman, Montgomery became one of the main writers of the Dick and Jane Basic Readers. The series was developed by the reading editor Zerna Sharp, who came with the concept that repeating words, using limited vocabularies and also using familiar situations and illustrations helped or facilitated children in learning to read. Eleanor Campbell was the artist who illustrated the books. Many of the plots used in the book and its subsequent volumes were developed by Montgomery.

A number of schools adopted the books for their first-grade learners. At their peak, about eight out of every ten first-grade pupils in the United States learned to read with the series. After Montgomery's death, her obituary in The Washington Post reported that the books had been used to educate over 20 million children.

The first book she worked on was We Look and See (1940), which used only 17 different words. She additionally worked on We Work and Play and We Come and Go. She also co-authored Happy Days with Our Friends with W. W. Bauer, published by Scott Foresman in 1954.

Montgomery worked for Scott Foresman for 25 years, leaving the company in 1963. During this period, she also helped write a series of health textbooks for the company. Later, she stated that it was not easy to work on the Dick and Jane books. In 1948 she did an interview where she explained to The Seattle Times that the constant collaborations that she worked under did not allow her to write entirely how she wanted.

She wrote to a magazine in 1977 to correct what she saw as a common misconception about the books. She explained that she had not created Dick and Jane Basic Readers herself. According to Montgomery, Zerna Sharp had developed the plan for the series, while Montgomery wrote the stories.

== Later writing career ==
In 1963 Montgomery left Scott Foresman, and continued to work as an independent writer for about 14 years. She authored numerous young readers' books. She also wrote short biographies of several famous individuals for Garrard Publishing, including Duke Ellington, Albert Schweitzer, Walt Disney, Henry Ford, and Mahatma Gandhi. For Dodd, Mead, she penned the book series Story Behind…, which explained the histories of inventions for widely known items such as books, popular songs, and music instruments.

In addition, Montgomery was the author of children's novels. These included Three Miles an Hour, Second Fiddle Sandra, and Two Kinds of Courage (1966), a novel set at a ski school near Snoqualmie Pass. She wrote plays, too, among her other publications. One of them is a one-act comedy called The Klep, dating from about 1963. She won a number of national awards for her plays.

Montgomery published her first book for adults, The Builder Also Grows, in 1977. She also authored a second adult novel, A Time to Every Purpose, but that book did not get published. Using the pen name Angela Towne, she wrote a small gift book titled His Cut and Her Cut.

Montgomery was the author of over 70 published works when she passed away. She wrote early reading books, picture books, health textbooks, history books, and magazine articles. She had won awards presented by the National Federation of Press Women and the National League of American Pen Women. She was also honored at the Matrix Table, a professional women's group in Seattle, in 1953.

== Personal life and public recognition ==
Montgomery lived in Seattle for most of her adult life. Her story was featured in newspaper profiles of her waterfront residence and how she balanced writing, research and family. She said she took notes in her diary and wrote some of her observations as fiction.

Montgomery was a guest on the TV game show To Tell the Truth, in 1977. The panel of celebrity guest judges were requested to determine which one of the contestants was the true children's author.

In 1976, Montgomery spoke to Tacoma's The News Tribune about the criticism of the roles for men and women portrayed in the Dick and Jane books. She said that by 1970s standards, the books might be sexist, but they reflected the social context in which they were written. She said that, if she were writing the books at that time, she would depict mothers and fathers sharing household and practical responsibilities.

Montgomery died in Seattle on February 19, 1985, at the age of 82.

== Legacy ==
Montgomery's Dick and Jane books were used as one of the nation's most popular reading series. They peaked in popularity in many public schools in the United States, where they were applied to the teaching of young children to read.

The Special Collections reading room in Wilson Library at Western Washington University, where researchers can consult the Elizabeth Rider Montgomery Papers.

Later the books received criticism due to their images of family and social roles. A pamphlet called Dick and Jane as Victims was released by the National Organization for Women in 1972. It said that the books brought the message to children that there were two jobs, one inside and one outside the home, both of which were distinctively feminine and masculine. The Dick and Jane series went on to serve as a symbol for a restricted and overwhelmingly white picture of American life in writer Toni Morrison's 1970 novel The Bluest Eye. Scholar Phyllis R. Klotman discussed this use of the series in a 1979 academic journal article.

Montgomery's papers are held by two universities. The greater collection is at Western Washington University at Bellingham, Washington, and dates from her career from 1897 to 1983. A smaller collection of manuscripts and research notes is housed in the University of Southern Mississippi. Her work has also been featured in American exhibitions at the University of Minnesota's Kerlan Collection.
