= Eleanor Campbell (illustrator) =

Illustrator of children's books and portrait artist

Eleanor B. Campbell (1894–1986) was an early-twentieth-century illustrator of children's books and portrait artist.

== Education and career ==
Campbell was from Philadelphia, and spent part of her childhood in Seattle, Washington. Both her parents had studied art, and one of her sisters was Elizabeth Campbell Warhanik, an artist and one of the founders of Women Painters of Washington. Campbell studied at the Sorbonne. She illustrated children's books, especially for the P. F. Volland Company and Scott Foresman. A review of Roberta Goes Adventuring (P.F. Volland, 1931) described Campbell, as "the artist who knows all about little boys and girls as well as little black dogs with little pink tongues."

Campbell was the first illustrator of the Dick and Jane series of beginning readers created by Zerna Sharp. Her watercolors for the series were intended to show "scenes as a child might see the world", including everyday activities such as when "a preschooler tries to give a teddy bear a drink at a water fountain or dress up in their parents' clothes or help mom take the laundry down from the line before the rain starts." Campbell based her illustrations on photographs she took of her friends' and relations' children. An exhibition of 50 of Campbell's original artworks for the series, held at the Lakeview Museum of Arts and Sciences, was so popular that it was extended from the planned three months to seventeen months. The Dick and Jane illustrations have been criticised for reinforcing class, race and gender stereotypes.

Campbell's illustrations were also featured in advertising for Kellogg's and Wheatena cereals.

After retiring, Campbell lived in Seattle, where she died in 1986.

== Selected publications ==
- School Days. Whitman, 1931.
- Raymond, Margaret Thomsen. Roberta Goes Adventuring. Illustrated by Eleanor Campbell. Joliet: P. F. Volland Company, 1931. Happy Children series.
- White, Jessie Penniman. Top O' the Morning. Joliet: P. F. Volland Company, 1931.
- Gray, William S. We Look and See. Chicago: Scott, Foresman, 1940.
- Gray, William S. We Come and Go. Chicago: Scott, Foresman, 1946 & 1947.
- Campbell, Eleanor, William S. Gray, Paul R. Hanna, Genevieve Anderson Hoyt, Walter Oschman, and John Osebold. Guidebook for a Social Studies Book B "Hello, David". Chicago: Scott, Foresman, 1948.
- O'Brien, J. A. Fun with John and Jean. Toronto: W. J. Gage, 1952.
- Gray, William S. The New We Look and See. Chicago: Scott, Foresman, 1956.
- Campbell, Eleanor -, Elizabeth Rider Montgomery, Dorthy Baruch, and William S. Gray. The World of Dick and Jane and Friends. NY: Scott, Foresman, and Company (Grosset & Dunlap), 2004. (compilation)
