= Helen Robinson =

Helen Robinson may refer to:

- Helen Robinson (businesswoman) (born 1965), businesswoman and company director from New Zealand
- Helen M. Robinson (1906–1988), American author and educator
- Helen Ring Robinson (1878–1923), American suffragist, writer, and political office holder
