= Helen M. Robinson =

American author and educator

- Born: May 28, 1906 near Athens, Ohio, US
- Died: June 29, 1988 (aged 82)

Academic background
- Education: Ohio University; Ohio State University; University of Chicago

Academic work
- Institutions: University of Chicago
- Main interests: reading education
- Notable works: Dick and Jane series

Helen M. Robinson (1906–1988) was an American writer and educator who became the lead writer of the Dick and Jane series of readers after the death of William S. Gray in 1960, a status she retained through the late 1970s. She was a professor at the University of Chicago from 1944 to 1968, and was nationally recognized in the field of reading education. She served as first President of the Reading Hall of Fame.

== Life and career ==
Robinson was born to a farming family near Athens, Ohio, and her initial instruction was in a one-room schoolhouse. She received an A.B. in Mathematics in 1926 from Ohio University and went on to Ohio State University to study psychology. She received an M.A. in 1927 and taught at Miami University in Oxford, Ohio for several years before beginning doctoral work with William S. Gray at the University of Chicago.

Robinson began to be recognized as a leading expert in the field of reading education. Robinson completed her Ph.D. in 1944, and in 1946 Why Pupils Fail in Reading (based on her dissertation) was published. The book was recognized as a classic in the field of education. Robinson was also the first woman to be a full professor in the University of Chicago Department of Education In 1961 she was appointed to the William Scott Gray research professorship, making her the fifth woman and 36th faculty member overall at University of Chicago to hold a named professorship.

Robinson died in 1988, and is remembered chiefly as the author of the Dick and Jane series, as well as a pioneer of reading education.

== Publications ==
Robinson published for over five decades, with her first article appearing in 1929 and her last in 1985. She authored over 130 scholarly works.
