= Mr. Mugs =

Canadian children's book series

Mr. Mugs is the title character in a series of children's books written by Martha Kambeitz and Carol Roth and published by Ginn and Company (now part of Prentice Hall). Mr. Mugs was an Old English Sheepdog who lived with two children, Pat and Cathy. These readers were used in Canadian elementary schools in the 1970s and early 1980s to teach reading. There were 3 different series (with seven levels within each series) of "Mr. Mugs" books: "Ginn Integrated Language Program"; "Light and Life Reading Series"; and "Sharing Points in Language Arts". While two titles were published in hardcover, the rest of the "Mr. Mugs" titles were published in softcover.

== Series titles ==
=== Ginn Integrated Language Program ===
Books in this series are:

- What A Dog! (1968) G-07987 Level 1 - Book 1
- Meet My Pals (1968) CDEFG-07987654321 Level 1 - Book 2
- Take A Peek! (1968) DEFG-07987654321 Level 1 - Book 3
- Up The Beanstalk (1968) EFG-079876543 Level 2 - (Hardcover)
- Rockets Away! (1968) EFG-079876543 Level 3 - (Hardcover)
- All About Me! (1969) GHIJK-0798765 Level 4 - Book 1
- Mugs Scores! (1969) BCDE-079876543210 Level 4 - Book 2
- Carnival (1969) GHIJK-079876 Level 4 - Book 3
- Moon Shiny Night (1970) GHIJK-0798765 Level 5 - Book 1
- Higgleby's House (1970) GHIJK-0798765 Level 5 - Book 2
- Close-Up (1970) DE-0798765432 Level 5 - Book 3
- Bundle Of Sticks (1970) F-79876 Level 6 - Book 1 C-51200
- Topsy-Turvy (1970) E-7987654 Level 6 - Book 2 C-51210
- Taking Off! (1970) BCDE-7987654321 Level 6 - Book 3 C-51220
- Deep Sea Smile (1970) ABCDE-079876543210 Level 7 - Book 1 C-51235
- Detective Game (1970) BCDE-07987654321 Level 7 - Book 2 C-51245
- Catch A Firefly (1970) BCDE-07987654321 Level 7 - Book 3 C-51255

=== Light and Life Reading Series ===
Books in this series are:

- Meet Mr Mugs (1966) BCDEFG-0698 Level 1 - Book 1 C-64100
- Pals And Pets (1967) BCDEFG-0698 Level 1 - Book 2
- Peek In, Please! (1967) ABCDE-06987 Level 1 - Book 3
- Just For Fun (1967) DEFG-079876 Level 2 - (Hardcover)
- Blast Off! (1967) BCDEFG-069 Level 3 - (Hardcover)
- Ooops Splash! (1969) BCDE-079876543210 Level 4 - Book 1
- Pickety Fence (1969) ABCDE-069 Level 4 - Book 2
- Blackout (1969) CDE-079876543 Level 4 - Book 3
- Mugs Starts School (1969) CDE-079876543 Level 5 - Book 1
- Hamish Hampster (1969) ABCDE-069 Level 5 - Book 2
- In The Sun (1969) ABCDE-069 Level 5 - Book 3
- Something Wonderful! Level 6 - Book 1
- Singing Water (1970) BCDE-798765432 Level 6 - Book 2 C-64780
- Switch On The Night Level 6 - Book 3
- Fish Head Level 7 - Book 1
- Small Blue Bead Level 7 - Book 2
- Listening Tree (1970) ABCDE-079876543210 Level 7 - Book 3 C-64840

=== Starting Points in Language Arts ===
Books in this series are: (workbooks with ISBN are also listed)

- Mr. Mugs (1976) ISBN 0-7702-0206-3 Level 1 - Book 1 C-52300
- Mr. Mugs - A Jet-Pet (1976) ISBN 0-7702-0207-1 Level 1 - Book 2 C-52305
- Workbook - Level 1 (1976) - ISBN 0-7702-0209-8 C-52315
- Mr. Mugs Plays Ball (1976) ISBN 0-7702-0221-7 Level 2 - Book 1 C-52375
- Mr. Mugs And The Blue Whale (1976) ISBN 0-7702-0222-5 Level 2 - Book 2 C-52380
- Workbook - Level 2 (1976) - ISBN 0-7702-0224-1 C-52390
- First Prize for Mr. Mugs (1976) ISBN 0-7702-0228-4 Level 3 - Book 1 C-52410
- Mr. Mugs is Lost (1976) ISBN 0-7702-0229-2 Level 3 - Book 2 C-52415
- Workbook - Level 3 (1977) - ISBN 0-7702-0231-4 C-52425
- Sharing Time (1977) ISBN 0-7702-0236-5 Level 4 - Book 1 C-52450
- Happy Days for Mr. Mugs (1977) ISBN 0-7702-0237-3 Level 4 - Book 2 C-52455
- In A Dark Wood (1977) ISBN 0-7702-0238-1 Level 4 - Book 3 C-52460
- Workbook - Level 4 (1977) - ISBN 0-7702-0240-3 C-52470
- Mr. Mugs at School (1977) ISBN 0-7702-0243-8 Level 5 - Book 1 C-52485
- In The Rain (1977) ISBN 0-7702-0244-6 Level 5 - Book 2 C-52490
- Mr. Mugs to the Rescue (1977) ISBN 0-7702-0245-4 Level 5 - Book 3 C-52495
- Workbook - Level 5 (1978) - ISBN 0-7702-0247-0 C 52505
- Mr. Mugs is Kidnapped (1978) ISBN 0-7702-0250-0 Level 6 - Book 1 C-52520
- It's Saturday (1978) ISBN 0-7702-0251-9 Level 6 - Book 2 C-52525
- Feather Or Fur (1978) ISBN 0-7702-0252-7 Level 6 - Book 3 C-52530
- Workbook - Level 6 (1978) - ISBN 0-7702-0254-3 C-52540
- Just Beyond (1978) ISBN 0-7702-0257-8 Level 7 - Book 1 C-52555
- What If? (1978) ISBN 0-7702-0258-6 Level 7 - Book 2 C-52560
- The Secret Life of Mr. Mugs (1978) ISBN 0-7702-0259-4 Level 7 - Book 3 C-52565
- Workbook - Level 7 (1979) - ISBN 0-7702-0261-6 C-52575
