= Charles Pierce Burton =

American writer

Charles Pierce Burton (1862–1949) was a newspaper columnist and author of the "Bob's Hill" young adult books.

== Biographical details ==
Burton was born in Anderson, Indiana, in Madison County. His father worked for a newspaper and met his mother when she wrote columns for the paper as a student. As a child, Burton moved to Adams, Massachusetts, where he hiked around a ridge called Bob's Hill on the eastern slope of Mt. Greylock in Berkshire County. This ridge and the town of Adams would be the setting of most of Burton's later books. After the death of his mother, Burton and his father eventually moved to Aurora, Illinois. Burton attended East Aurora High School, where he graduated in 1880.

Burton began writing books after hearing an editor mention that he was looking for a series of boys' books. Burton set his books in a fictionalized version of Adams, Massachusetts. The beloved Bob's Hill series eventually covered 12 books, whose characters traveled to many parts of the world.

Burton worked as the editor of Earth Mover magazine and wrote a history column for The Aurora Beacon-News. The columns were later collected into a book of historical stories about Aurora. Burton also published a collection of light essays entitled, "The Bashful Man and Others".

== List of books by Charles Pierce Burton ==
- The Boys of Bob's Hill: The Adventures of Tom Chapin And The “Band”, as Told By The “Secretary" (1905)
- The Bob's Cave Boys (1909)
- The Bob's Hill Braves (1910)
- The Boy Scouts of Bob's Hill (1912)
- Camp Bob's Hill (1915)
- Raven Patrol of Bob's Hill (1916)
- Bob's Hill Trails (1922)
- Treasure Hunters of Bob's Hill (1926)
- Bob's Hill Meets the Andes: Doings of the “Band” in South America as Told In the Minutes (1928)
- Bob's Hill Boys in the Everglades (1932)
- Bob's Hill On the Air: Some Adventures the Secretary Failed to Record In The “Minutes of the Meeting” (1934)
- Bob's Hill Boys in Virginia (1939)
