= Janet and Mark =

Series of children's early reading books

Janet and Mark were a series of basic reading books from Harper and Row first published in 1966. They were not unlike the early Dick and Jane series. In 1969, California adopted the line of textbooks for use throughout the state for children four to eight years old.

== Books ==
- On our Way to Read – used prior to the pre-primer series
- Janet and Mark
- Outdoors and In
- City Days, City Ways
- Just for Fun
- Real and Make-Believe
- From Faraway Places
- Around the Corner
