= Arthur Irving Gates =

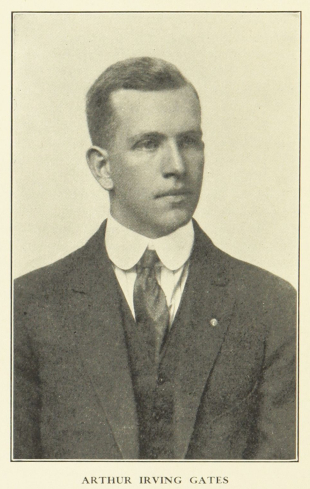
Portrait c. 1916

Arthur Irving Gates (22 September 1890 – 24 August 1972) was an American educationist who specialized in educational psychology. He wrote several books and papers on remedial education, testing, and reading; and served as a professor in Columbia University.

Gates was born in Red Wing, Minnesota to William P. and Lenore Gaylord (who had a son from an earlier marriage). He began to read by the age of three thanks to his mother's teaching. The family moved in 1892 to Fortuna, California where his father worked in a lumber company. He went to local schools and joined the University of California, Berkeley majoring in experimental psychology. He spent a few years of graduate studies and then moved to Columbia University where he obtained his doctoral degree in 1917 and then joined as a teaching fellow. He became a full professor in 1956. He wrote several books on the psychology of reading, the remediation of reading difficulties, and put forward support for the view that children should not be taught reading as an end in itself or as an isolated activity but in the context of things and activities that they find interesting. Some of his students included Ruth Strang, Margaret Mead, Dorothy Van Alstyne, Guy L. Bond, and David H. Russell. His student Walter H. McGinitie was involved in the creation of the reading test known as the Gates-McGinitie Reading Test.

In 1920 he married Georgina Strickland, who received a PhD in psychology from Columbia University. They had a daughter Katherine who was a doctorate in English literature from Harvard-Radcliffe.
