= Paul Childress =

American powerlifter

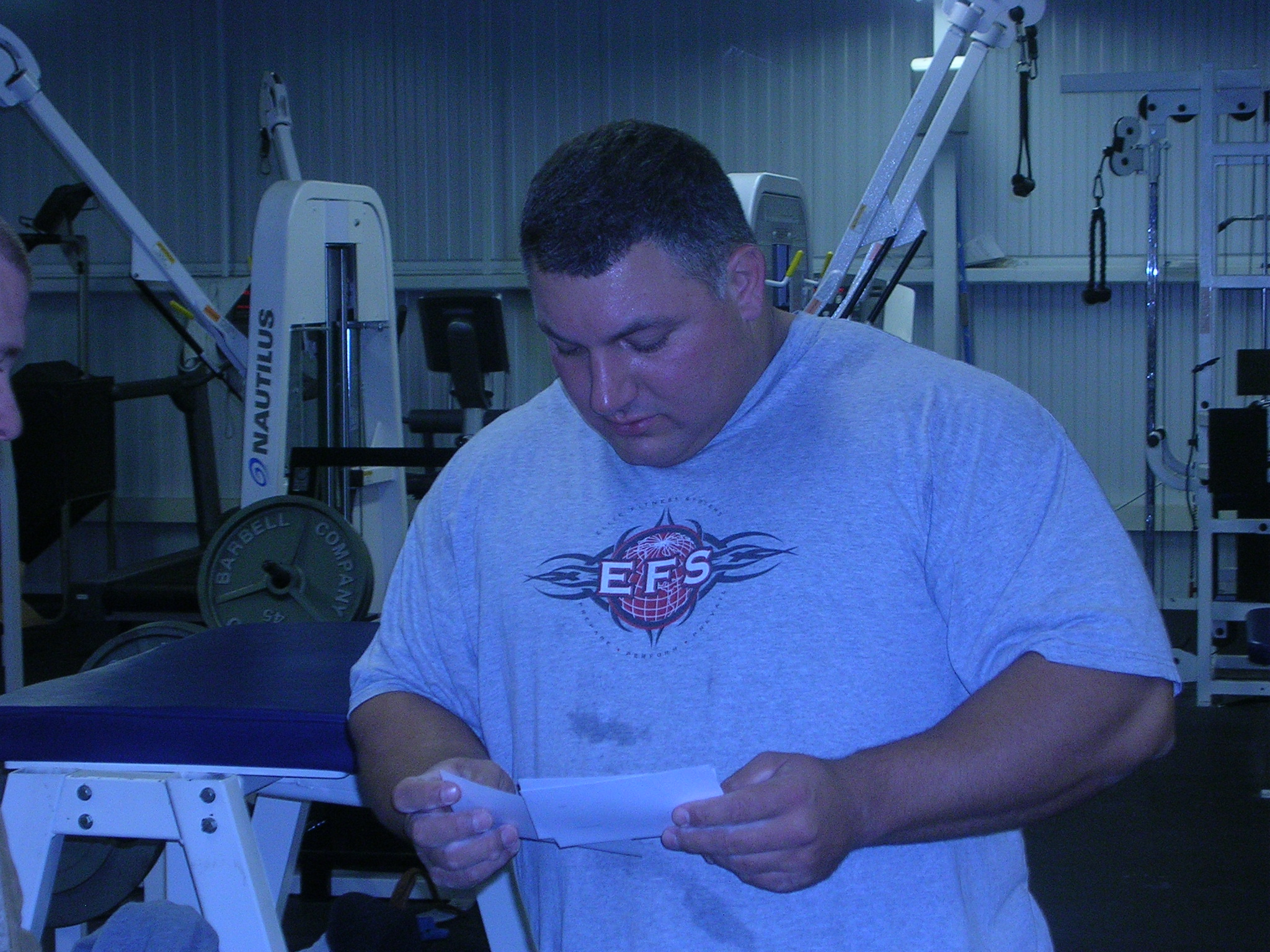

Paul Childress was an American powerlifter. He holds the World Powerlifting Organization (WPO) world record in the 308 lb. weight class with a squat of 1147.5 lb. and has the third best total in the world with 2662.1 lb. He was a major part of the fitness industry for over 25 years.

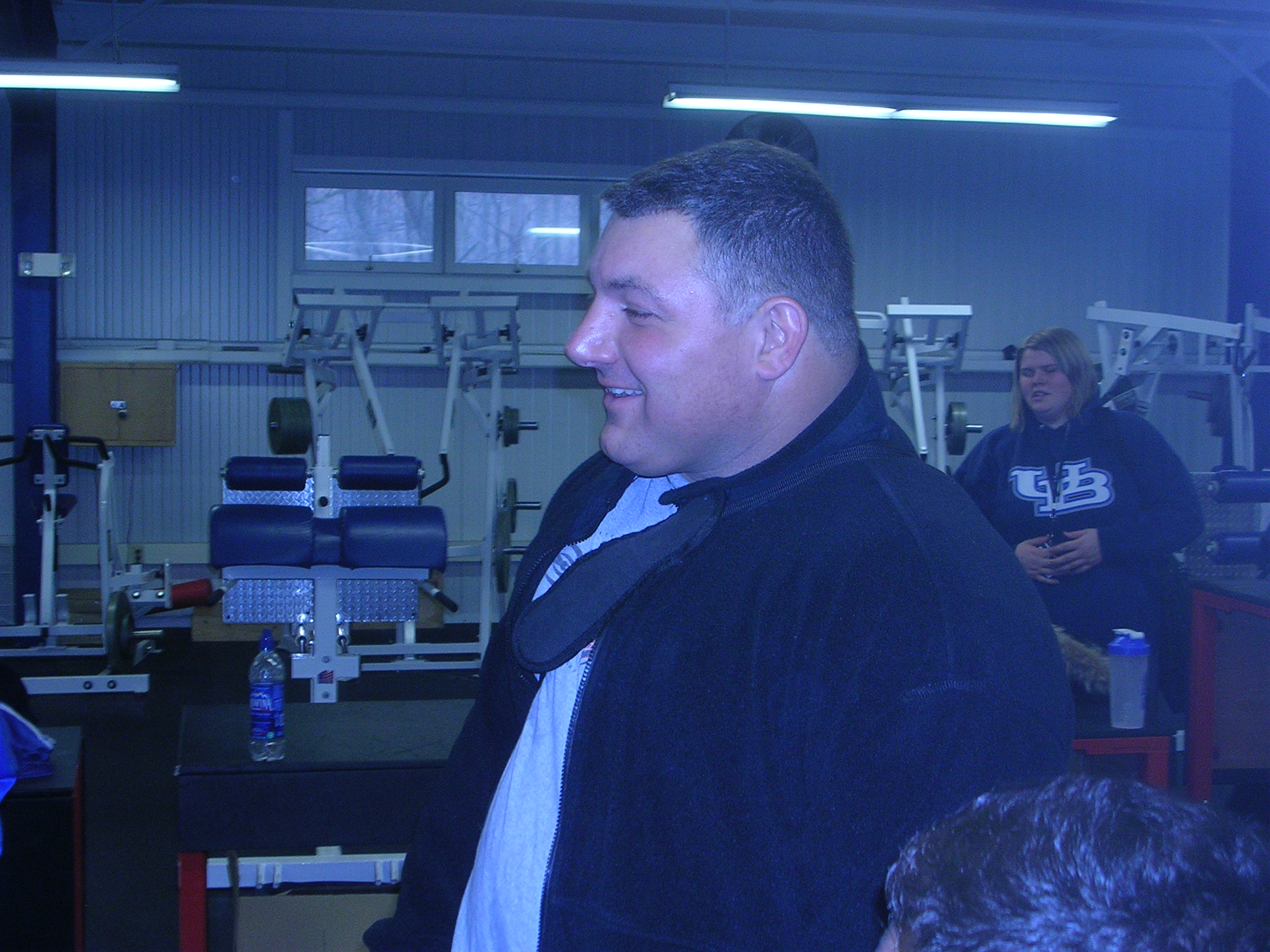

In 2004 at the GNC Show of Strength WPO Childress became the first man in the 308 lb. weight class to squat over 1100 lb. and win the 308 and SHW weight class.

Childress was the Head Strength Coach for the Buffalo Bulls. Prior to joining UB, Childress worked at Total Health and Fitness as director of facilities and fitness management. He also was a consultant for elite fitness systems (a powerlifting and strength organization) which sells powerlifting gear. He worked with over 28 professional athletes, specialising in strength training, nutrition, athletic performance and conditioning

Childress had a bachelor's degree in health and wellness from Buffalo State and a master's degree in physical education from Canisius. He was a 3 time All-American at Buffalo State in football

In 1978, he was watching on TV the WSM competition which later inspired him to become a powerlifter. In 1978, he received for Christmas a training kit consisting of weights and dumbbells and that was a pivotal moment in his life.
