= Ant and Bee =

Series of children's early reading books

- First edition (book 2)
- Author: Angela Banner
- Illustrator: Bryan Ward (original editions)
- ISBN: 978-1405279321

The Ant and Bee stories are a series of small-format hardback books written by Angela Banner (pseudonym of Angela Mary Maddison [nee Lincke], 1923–2014). She began writing the books in order to teach her son how to read. Angela Mary Lincke married Major Lionel Henry Mosse Parsons and had two children.

The first volume was published in the United Kingdom in 1950 and the last in 1972 by Edmund Ward Limited, later Kaye & Ward. At least some volumes were published in the United States by Franklin Watts Inc. The books were reprinted by Trafalgar Square Publishing in the late 1980s and early 1990s. New editions of certain volumes were published in 2013 by Egmont UK Limited.

Angela Banner wrote all the books in the series and also illustrated the last four. Earlier volumes were illustrated by Bryan Ward, but the 2013 editions of these volumes feature illustrations by the author. Simple three- and four-letter words occur repeatedly and are printed in red type for children to read out while a parent reads the rest. The books also teach children about the alphabet, numbers, shapes, colours, countries of the world and calendar and clock reading. Each so-called alphabetical story emphasizes words beginning with consecutive letters of the alphabet, e.g., arrow, bread, chair and so on.

The principal characters are the good friends Ant (the naughtier and more adventurous half of the duo) and Bee (fussier and more sensible). Other regular characters are Kind Dog and his master, the Zoo Man.

== Series ==
The original series comprised thirteen volumes, listed below with the book number that was printed on the cover on some UK editions.

- Book 1. Ant and Bee and the ABC
- Book 2. Ant and Bee, An Alphabetical Story for Tiny Tots
- Book 3. More Ant and Bee, Another Alphabetical Story for Tiny Tots
- Book 4. One, Two, Three with Ant and Bee, A Counting Story
- Book 5. Around the World with Ant and Bee (about travel)
- Book 6. More and More Ant and Bee, Another Alphabetical Story
- Book 7. Ant and Bee and the Rainbow, A Story About Colours
- Book 8. Ant and Bee and Kind Dog, An Alphabetical Story
- Book 9. Happy Birthday with Ant and Bee (about the days of the week)
- Book 10. Ant and Bee Time (about clock reading)
- Book 11. Ant and Bee and the Secret (about school)
- Book 12. Ant and Bee and the Doctor (about illness)
- Book 13. Ant and Bee Go Shopping (about shapes)

Since Angela Banner's death, as part of the series of revised editions published by Egmont, with amended text and a new illustrator, additional volumes have been published, attributed to Angela Banner:

- Book 14. Left and Right with Ant and Bee (about left and right)
- Book 15. Make a Million with Ant and Bee (counting higher numbers)

== See also ==
- Dick and Jane
- Janet and John
