= Most common words in English =

Studies that estimate and rank the most common words in English examine texts written in English. Perhaps the most comprehensive such analysis is one that was conducted against the Oxford English Corpus (OEC), a massive text corpus that is written in the English language.

In total, the texts in the Oxford English Corpus contain more than 2 billion words. The OEC includes a wide variety of writing samples, such as literary works, novels, academic journals, newspapers, magazines, Hansard's Parliamentary Debates, blogs, chat logs, and emails.

Another English corpus that has been used to study word frequency is the Brown Corpus, which was compiled by researchers at Brown University in the 1960s. The researchers published their analysis of the Brown Corpus in 1967. Their findings were similar, but not identical, to the findings of the OEC analysis.

According to The Reading Teacher's Book of Lists, the first 25 words in the OEC make up about one-third of all printed material in English, and the first 100 words make up about half of all written English. According to a study cited by Robert McCrum in The Story of English, all of the first hundred of the most common words in English are of either Old English or Old Norse origin, except for just, ultimately from Latin "iustus"; people, ultimately from Latin "populus"; use, ultimately from Latin "usare"; and because, in part from Latin "causa".

Some lists of common words distinguish between word forms, while others rank all forms of a word as a single lexeme (the form of the word as it would appear in a dictionary). For example, the lexeme be (as in to be) comprises all its conjugations (am, are, is, was, were, etc.), and contractions of those conjugations. These top 100 lemmas listed below account for 50% of all the words in the Oxford English Corpus.

== 100 most common words ==
A list of 100 words that occur most frequently in written English is given below, based on an analysis of the Oxford English Corpus (a collection of texts in the English language, comprising over 2 billion words). A part of speech is provided for most of the words, but part-of-speech categories vary between analyses, and not all possibilities are listed. For example, "I" may be a pronoun or a Roman numeral; "to" may be a preposition or an infinitive marker; "time" may be a noun or a verb. Also, a single spelling can represent more than one root word. For example, "singer" may be a form of either "sing" or "singe". Different corpora may treat such difference differently.

The number of distinct senses that are listed in Wiktionary is shown in the polysemy column. For example, "out" can refer to an escape, a removal from play in baseball, or any of 36 other concepts. On average, each word in the list has 15.38 senses. The sense count does not include the use of terms in phrasal verbs such as "put out" (as in "inconvenienced") and other multiword expressions such as the interjection "get out!", where the word "out" does not have an individual meaning. As an example, "out" occurs in at least 560 phrasal verbs and appears in nearly 1700 multiword expressions.

The table also includes frequencies from other corpora. As well as usage differences, lemmatisation may differ from corpus to corpus – for example splitting the prepositional use of "to" from the use as a particle. Also, the Corpus of Contemporary American English (COCA) list includes dispersion as well as frequency to calculate rank.

Word	Parts of speech	OEC rank	COCA rank	Dolch level	Polysemy
the	Article	1	1	Pre-primer	12
be	Verb	2	2	Primer	21
to	Preposition	3	7, 9	Pre-primer	17
of	Preposition	4	4	Grade 1	12
and	Coordinator	5	3	Pre-primer	16
a	Article	6	5	Pre-primer	20
in	Preposition	7	6, 128, 3038	Pre-primer	23
that	Subordinator, determiner	8	12, 27, 903	Primer	17
have	Verb	9	8	Primer	25
I	Pronoun	10	11	Pre-primer	7
it	Pronoun	11	10	Pre-primer	18
for	Preposition	12	13, 2339	Pre-primer	19
not	Adverb et al.	13	28, 2929	Pre-primer	5
on	Preposition	14	17, 155	Primer	43
with	Preposition	15	16	Primer	11
he	Pronoun	16	15	Primer	7
as	Adverb, preposition	17	33, 49, 129	Grade 1	17
you	Pronoun	18	14	Pre-primer	9
do	Verb, noun	19	18	Primer	38
at	Preposition	20	22	Primer	14
this	Determiner, adverb, noun	21	20, 4665	Primer	9
but	Preposition, adverb, coordinator	22	23, 1715	Primer	17
his	Possessive pronoun	23	25, 1887	Grade 1	6
by	Preposition	24	30, 1190	Grade 1	19
from	Preposition	25	26	Grade 1	4
they	Pronoun	26	21	Primer	6
we	Pronoun	27	24	Pre-primer	6
say	Verb et al.	28	19	Primer	17
her	Possessive pronoun	29, 106	42	Grade 1	3
she	Pronoun	30	31	Primer	7
or	Coordinator	31	32	Grade 2	11
an	Article	32	(a)	Grade 1	6
will	Verb, noun	33	48, 1506	Primer	16
my	Possessive pronoun	34	44	Pre-primer	5
one	Noun, adjective, et al.	35	51, 104, 839	Pre-primer	24
all	Adjective	36	43, 222	Primer	15
would	Verb	37	41	Grade 2	13
there	Adverb, pronoun, et al.	38	53, 116	Primer	14
their	Possessive pronoun	39	36	Grade 2	2
what	Pronoun, adverb, et al.	40	34	Primer	19
so	Coordinator, adverb, et al.	41	55, 196	Primer	18
up	Adverb, preposition, et al.	42	50, 456	Pre-primer	50
out	Preposition	43	64, 149	Primer	38
if	Preposition	44	40	Grade 3	9
about	Preposition, adverb, et al.	45	46, 179	Grade 3	18
who	Pronoun, noun	46	38	Primer	5
get	Verb	47	39	Primer	37
which	Pronoun	48	58	Grade 2	7
go	Verb, noun	49	35	Pre-primer	54
me	Pronoun	50	61	Pre-primer	10
when	Adverb	51	57, 136	Grade 1	11
make	Verb, noun	52	45	Grade 2 [as "made"]	48
can	Verb, noun	53	37, 2973	Pre-primer	18
like	Preposition, verb	54	74, 208, 1123, 1684, 2702	Primer	26
time	Noun	55	52	Dolch list of 95 nouns	14
no	Determiner, adverb	56	93, 699, 916, 1111, 4555	Primer	10
just	Adjective	57	66, 1823	Grade 1	14
him	Pronoun	58	68	Grade 1	5
know	Verb, noun	59	47	Grade 1	13
take	Verb, noun	60	63	Grade 1	66
people	Noun	61	62		9
into	Preposition	62	65	Primer	10
year	Noun	63	54		7
your	Possessive pronoun	64	69	Grade 2	4
good	Adjective	65	110, 2280	Primer	32
some	Determiner	66	60	Grade 1	10
could	Verb	67	71	Grade 1	6
them	Pronoun	68	59	Grade 1	3
see	Verb	69	67		25
other	Adjective, pronoun	70	75, 715, 2355		12
than	Preposition	71	73, 712		4
then	Adverb	72	77	Grade 1	10
now	Preposition	73	72, 1906	Primer	13
look	Verb	74	85, 604	Pre-primer	17
only	Adverb	75	101, 329	Grade 3	11
come	Verb	76	70	Pre-primer	20
its	Possessive pronoun	77	78	Grade 2	2
over	Preposition	78	124, 182	Grade 1	19
think	Verb	79	56	Grade 1	10
also	Adverb	80	87		2
back	Noun, adverb	81	108, 323, 1877	Dolch list of 95 nouns	36
after	Preposition	82	120, 260	Grade 1	14
use	Verb, noun	83	92, 429	Grade 2	17
two	Noun	84	80	Pre-primer	6
how	Adverb	85	76	Grade 1	11
our	Possessive pronoun	86	79	Primer	3
work	Verb, noun	87	117, 199	Grade 2	28
first	Adjective	88	86, 2064	Grade 2	10
well	Adverb	89	100, 644	Primer	30
way	Noun, adverb	90	84, 4090	Dolch list of 95 nouns	16
even	Adjective	91	107, 484		23
new	Adjective et al.	92	88	Primer	18
want	Verb	93	83	Primer	10
because	Preposition	94	89, 509	Grade 2	7
any	Pronoun	95	109, 4720	Grade 1	4
these	Pronoun	96	82	Grade 2	2
give	Verb	97	98	Grade 1	19
day	Noun	98	90	Dolch list of 95 nouns	9
most	Adverb	99	144, 187		12
us	Pronoun	100	113	Grade 2	6

=== Parts of speech ===
The following is a very similar list, also from the OEC, subdivided by part of speech. The list labeled "Others" includes pronouns, possessives, articles, modal verbs, adverbs, and conjunctions.

Rank	Nouns	Verbs	Adjectives	Prepositions	Others
1	time	be	good	to	the
2	person	have	new	of	and
3	year	do	first	in	a
4	way	say	last	for	that
5	day	get	long	on	I
6	thing	make	great	with	it
7	man	go	little	at	not
8	world	know	own	by	he
9	life	take	other	from	as
10	hand	see	old	up	you
11	part	come	right	about	this
12	child	think	big	into	but
13	eye	look	high	over	his
14	woman	want	different	after	they
15	place	give	small		her
16	work	use	large		she
17	week	find	next		or
18	case	tell	early		an
19	point	ask	young		will
20	government	work	important		my
21	company	seem	few		one
22	number	feel	public		all
23	group	try	bad		would
24	problem	leave	same		there
25	fact	call	able		their

== See also ==
- Basic English
- Frequency analysis, the study of the frequency of letters or groups of letters
- Letter frequencies
- Oxford English Corpus
- Swadesh list, a compilation of basic concepts for the purpose of historical-comparative linguistics
- Zipf's law, a theory stating that the frequency of any word is inversely proportional to its rank in a frequency table

=== Word lists ===
- Dolch Word List, a list of frequently used English words
- General Service List
- New General Service List
- Word lists by frequency
