= Janet and John =

Series of children's early reading books

Janet and John series
- Book One first edition cover
- Author: Mabel O'Donnell and Rona Munro
- Cover artist: Florence and Margaret Hoopes (illustrators)
- Language: English
- Series: Janet and John series (Books One to Four)
- Genre: Children's reading books
- Publisher: James Nisbet and Company
- Publication date: 1949–50
- Media type: Print

Janet and John is a series of early reading books for children, originally published in the UK by James Nisbet and Co in four volumes in 1949–50, and one of the first to make use of the "look and say" approach. Further volumes appeared later, and the series became a sales success in the 1950s and 60s, both in the UK and in New Zealand. By the 1970s, the books were considered outdated, and several updated versions were issued. Facsimiles of two of the original volumes were reprinted in 2007 to cater for the nostalgia market.

== Origins ==
The Janet and John books were originally based on the Alice and Jerry series published by Row Peterson and Company in the United States, a series that had been written by Mabel O'Donnell and illustrated by Florence and Margaret Hoopes.

In 1949, the publisher James Nisbet and Co licensed and republished them in the UK as a series of four books called Janet and John. These had a new Anglicised text by Rona Munro, wife of John Mackenzie Wood who ran Nesbit and Co; she was originally a teacher from New Zealand. Illustrations were by Florence and Margaret Hoopes, with contributions from Christopher Sanders.

== Publications ==
The first volumes of the 1949–50 Janet and John series were simply called Books One to Four and presented, using limited vocabulary, incidents from the daily life of a brother and sister. Additional volumes soon followed: Through the Garden Gate (1950), Off to Play (1950), I Know a Story (1950), Here We Go (1951), and Once Upon a Time (1952). The books were described by the publishers as "true to the best in life of modern children".

Beginning in 1949, Nisbet released a version specially published for New Zealand, with the same authors and illustrators. There were seven books in all: Out and About (1949), I Know a Story (1949), I Went Walking (1949), Here We Go (1949), Off to Play (1949), Through the Garden Gate (1951), and Once upon a Time (1951). The only distinctive New Zealand feature was a Māori legend included in the final title, Once Upon a Time. Eighty thousand copies of each book were distributed free to New Zealand schools from 1950. A further 20–30,000 of each were printed in 1956, and another 12–20,000 in 1959.

== Heyday - 1950s and 1960s ==
The books became a familiar aid for teaching schoolchildren throughout the 1950s and 1960s, being used in 81% of British primary schools in 1968. They were one of the first popular "look-and-say" or "whole word" reading schemes, the approach being to repeat words sufficiently frequently that children memorised them – in contrast with the phonics method in which children were encouraged to decode groups of letters.

== 1970s ==
During the 1970s, new theories were developed on how children learn to read, and "real books" with "real stories" became increasingly popular. Janet and John's presentation of a middle-class nuclear family fell out of favour, and the series was discontinued in 1976.

=== Kathy and Mark ===
One of the Kathy and Mark Little Books (1973)

Working with Philippa Murray, Rona Munro created an updated series for Nisbet and Co called Kathy and Mark. In the UK there were three Kathy and Mark Little Book collections, each of four volumes: Green 1-4 (1973), Orange 1-4 (1973), and Turquoise 1-4 (1974). They incorporated small in-line illustrations in place of certain words, such as 'umbrella'. Nisbet published a variety of Kathy and Mark books with other colours and titles.

== 2000s ==
=== Star Kids version ===
Volume 1 of the Star Kids Janet and John series (2001)

Having purchased the rights to Janet and John from Nisbet and Co, Star Kids Ltd published an updated series of 33 volumes in 2001 covering reading, writing and mathematics for children aged four to seven. While the names Janet and John were retained, the text and illustrations were updated to include characters from different ethnic backgrounds and from non-nuclear families. The series attracted some criticism from those who disapproved of its disregard of phonics in favour of "look and say".

=== Summersdale reprints ===
In 2007, as part of a trend in publishing nostalgic facsimiles of old favourites, Summersdale Publishers reissued two of the original Janet and John books, Here We Go and Off to Play.

== Later critical responses ==
After the books fell out of fashion they became a target for ridicule on the basis of their stilted diction and overwhelmingly middle-class content. The radio broadcaster Terry Wogan regularly satirised the books on his BBC Radio 2 show Wake Up To Wogan by reading out stories featuring an adult Janet and John in the style of the original, deriving humour through euphemism and innuendo.

== See also ==
- Ant & Bee
- Dick and Jane
- Peter and Jane
- The Magic Key
