= Wilfred Reilly =

American political scientist

- Born: 1982 or 1983 (age 43–44)

Academic background
- Education: Southern Illinois University, Carbondale (BA, PhD); University of Illinois, Urbana-Champaign (JD)
- Thesis: The Effect of Racial Status and Other Core Characteristics on Collective Self-Esteem: A Quantitative Test of Divergent Theories of Identity Valuation (2015)

Academic work
- Discipline: Political science
- Institutions: Kentucky State University

Wilfred Reilly is an American academic and writer. He is an Associate Professor of Political Science at Kentucky State University. He holds a Ph.D. in Political Science from Southern Illinois University and a J.D. from the University of Illinois College of Law.

== Work ==
=== Hate Crime Hoax ===
Reilly's book Hate Crime Hoax: How the Left is Selling a Fake Race War was published by Regnery Publishing in February 2019. For the book, Reilly assembled a data set of 409 allegedly false or dubious hate crime allegations (concentrated during the past five years), which he describes as hoaxes on the basis of reports in mainstream national or regional news sources. Reilly has stated this data set is available to anyone who requests it. He uses this data to support his claim that a substantial percentage of all hate crime allegations must be hoaxes, given that, per his analysis, only about 7,000 reported hate crimes take place in a typical year, and at most, 8–10% of these receive the national or regional reporting that is required for inclusion in his data set.

In the wake of the Jussie Smollett hate crime hoax, Reilly authored an editorial outlining his case in USA Today. After interviewing Reilly, the Washington Post argued that hate crimes are on the rise and a relatively small percentage of allegations are hoaxes but quoted him as saying "It’s politicization to say there’s a massive surge of hate" under President Donald Trump and that political liberals tend to characterize all hate crimes as "attacks on innocent people of color" when "you don't know what happened."

Reilly has appeared or been quoted in television, radio and print media outlets, and claims that many or most recent high-profile hate crimes (like Smollett's alleged assault and Yasmin Seweid's anti-Muslim assault hoax) have turned out to be hoaxes.

=== Other work ===
On April 21, 2016, Reilly participated in a regionally-televised debate against the alt-right personality Jared Taylor. Reilly argued for the social value of diversity by contending that it makes life "more interesting, civilized, and fun" and used published research to point out that mono-racial societies (such as Bosnia and Somalia) are often no more peaceful or less conflicted than multi-racial societies because of the greater prevalence of tribal in-fighting within them. Taylor took the anti-diversity position.

Reilly's PhD dissertation, submitted in 2015, was The Effect of Racial Status and Other Core Characteristics on Collective Self-Esteem: A Quantitative Test of Divergent Theories of Identity Valuation. In 2019, he published a summary of his dissertation in Commentary magazine.

In January 2020, Reilly published Taboo, a book in which he argues that certain race, gender, and class issues can no longer be discussed in mainstream American society.

In 2025, Reilly testified as an expert witness for the Alabama attorney general’s office in a trial about the state’s congressional district map. Reilly used employment and commute data to argue that Mobile County was more closely related to Baldwin County than it was to the Black Belt. He argued that Mobile County and the Black Belt should not be treated as a single community for redistricting purposes. During cross-examination, the plaintiffs’ attorneys questioned not only the validity of his expertise in the matter but also his methodology.

== Views ==
In 2016, Reilly described Donald Trump as “the alt-right candidate,” given the fact that a number of alt-right media outlets had endorsed Trump for president. However, Reilly also criticized the Hillary Clinton team for making this endorsement of Trump by the alt-right (representing a minority of Trump voters in Reilly’s view) a focus of their campaign because, in effect, this focus was simply “shining [light] on some dark crevices of the internet.”
