= Word wall =

Collection of words on a wall for teaching

A word wall is a literacy tool composed of an organized collection of vocabulary words that are displayed in large visible letters on a wall, bulletin board, or other display surface in a classroom. The word wall is designed to be an interactive tool for students or others to use, and contains an array of words that can be used during writing and/or reading. The frequent exposure to words in the environment is thought to enhance students' memory. Word walls have been shown to be effective in teaching English Language Learners and students with disabilities.

== History of word walls ==
Word walls increased in popularity due to Dr. Patricia Cunningham's publication Phonics They Use: Words for Reading and Writing. The book, used by preservice and practicing teachers alike, provides a myriad of hands on activities to teach phonics in the classroom.

== Methods of usage ==
Word walls can be used in classrooms ranging from pre-school through high school. Word walls are becoming commonplace in classrooms for all subject areas. High schools teachers use word walls in their respective content areas to teach spelling, vocabulary words, and mathematics symbols.

Word walls are considered to be interactive and collaborative tools, as they are a student-created learning artifact due to their flexible nature and ability to "grow" alongside the students. Many variations of the word wall are currently in existence, including those featuring illustrations of the words and color-coded lists. Vocabulary words are often ordered alphabetically or grouped to support a certain area of study.

Words can be selected through the process of recognition of prior learning. Teachers assess the students' vocabulary knowledge in order to determine which words should be reviewed and which should be taught as new words. Often, words are paired alongside pictures to enhance understanding.

Typically associated with reading and writing instruction, word walls are used to foster phonemic awareness, display connections throughout word families (ex. "ack" - back, crack, slack, etc.), serve as a support/reference for students, and create meaningful experiences with new vocabulary words.

It is notable that word walls are not to be used alone to teach vocabulary. Students also need to be encouraged to interact with the words in intentional ways for their word knowledge to increase. For example, teachers can ask students to produce synonyms for a particular word or how to use it in a sentence.

== Research on students ==
=== English language learners ===
Research has suggested that word walls are a helpful tool for students who are learning English as a new language. English-language learners are shown to benefit from word walls because of the visual element and words that are pre-selected as appropriate for the student to use. For example, students learning English may refer to the word wall to use academic language in classroom conversations.

=== Students with disabilities ===
In a 2007 study, word walls in classrooms were found to improve the spelling skills of students with disabilities. Moreover, students used the words on the word walls in their writing pieces, which improved their writing. There was also a jump in students' motivation towards writing.
