= Robert Childress =

Robert Childress (1915–1983) was an American illustrator, perhaps best known for his work in the classic Dick and Jane books for children. He used his wife and children as models for some of the characters.

He studied architecture at Clemson University, graduating in 1936. In the 1940s, he painted ads for clients such as Duncan Hines, Campbell Soups, Coca-Cola, Wonder Bread, Bird's Eye, and GLF (Grange League Federation) which later became Agway. His works graced the covers of the nation's leading periodicals. He was commissioned to paint the portraits of several Deans at Cornell University, Duncan Hines, and U.S. Justice of the Supreme Court James F. Byrnes.

In the 1970s, he painted campus scenes of over thirty colleges and universities. Most of the original scenes hang in alumni offices around the country.

The Norman Rockwell Museum acquired a permanent collection of his works in 2014.
