= Dick and Jane =

Series of children's early reading books

Fun with Dick and Jane

Dick and Jane are the two protagonists created by Zerna Sharp for a series of basal readers (primers) written by William S. Gray to teach children to read. The characters first appeared in the Elson-Gray Readers in 1930 and continued in a subsequent series of books through the final version in 1965. On January 1, 2026, the first book entered the public domain in the US. These readers were used in classrooms in the United States and in some other English-speaking countries for nearly four decades, reaching the height of their popularity in the 1950s, when 80 percent of first-grade students in the United States used them. Although the Dick and Jane series of primers continued to be sold until 1973 and remained in use in some classrooms throughout the 1970s, they were replaced with other reading texts by the 1980s and gradually disappeared from school curricula.

The Dick and Jane series is known for its simple narrative text and watercolor illustrations. For a generation of middle-class Americans, the characters of "Dick", "Jane", and their younger sister "Sally" became household words. The Dick and Jane primers have become icons of mid-century American culture and collector's items.

Despite criticisms of the stereotypical content that depicted white, middle-class Americans and the "whole-word" or "sight word" (look-say) method of teaching reading on which these readers are based, they retain cultural significance for their impact on literacy education in the mid-twentieth century.

== Origins ==
The predecessors to the Dick and Jane primers were the phonics-based McGuffey Readers, which were popular from the mid-nineteenth to the mid-twentieth century, and the Elson Basic Readers. William Scott Gray (1885–1960), director of the Curriculum Foundation Series at Scott, Foresman and Company and dean of the University of Chicago's college of education, co-authored with William H. Elson the Elson Basic Readers (renamed the Elson-Gray Basic Readers in 1936), which Scott Foresman published in Chicago, Illinois. Gray's research focused on methods to improve reading instruction using content that would be of interest to children and develop their word-recognition skills.

Zerna Sharp, a former teacher, came up with the idea for what became the Dick and Jane readers for elementary school children while working as a reading consultant and textbook editor for Scott Foresman. She worked with Gray to develop the readers after noting the reduced reading ability of children and urged the use of a new reading format for primers. In addition, Sharp developed the main characters of "Dick" and "Jane", the older brother and sister in a fictional family that includes "Mother", "Father", and a younger sister named "Sally", their pets, "Spot" (originally a cat in the 1930s, but a dog in later editions), and "Puff", their cat; and a toy teddy bear named "Tim". Sharp named the characters, selected and edited the storylines from ideas that others submitted, and supervised production of the books. Gray and others wrote the Dick and Jane stories; illustrator Eleanor B. Campbell did most of the early illustrations.

"Dick" and "Jane" originally appeared in Elson-Gray Readers in 1930. Before the appearance of the first Dick and Jane stories, reading primers "generally included Bible stories or fairy tales with complicated language and few pictures." After the Elson-Gray series ended in 1940, the characters continued in a subsequent series of primary readers that were later revised and enlarged into newer editions, with two additional authors: May Hill Arbuthnot, an editor, and A Sterl Artley, a reading expert. The Dick and Jane readers were widely used in classrooms in the United States and in some other English-speaking countries—but not in the United Kingdom where home-grown equivalents like Janet and John or Ladybird's Peter and Jane series were read—for nearly four decades and reached the height of their popularity in the 1950s, when 80 percent of first-grade students in the United States were learning to read though these stories. The 1965 edition, the last of the Dick and Jane series, introduced the first black family as characters in a first-grade reader. Although the Dick and Jane series of primers continued to be sold until 1973 they remained in use in some classrooms throughout the 1970s. By the 1980s, the Dick and Jane stories had been replaced with other reading texts and gradually disappeared from school curricula. However, some ideologues believe they continue to serve as a model for restrictive reading practices in classrooms.

== Content and illustrations ==
William Gray and Zerna Sharp worked together to develop readers that incorporated the whole-word or look-say method of word recognition (also called sight reading). The Dick and Jane primers introduce new readers to one new word on each page and only five new words in each individual story. Gray and Sharp also wanted children who read the books to be able to readily identify with the characters. Sharp chose stories where the characters participate in typical children's activities.

The Dick and Jane primers were designed to teach reading as well as American middle-class values to school-aged children. The storylines describe the lives and experiences of a stereotypical American middle-class, white family in their suburban home. "Father" wears a suit, works in an office, mows the lawn, and washes the car. "Mother" stays at home, does housework, and raises the children. "Dick", the oldest of the family's three children, is active and well-behaved; "Jane", the middle child, is pretty and carefree. She also helps care for "Sally", the baby of the family.

The texts and illustrations for the Dick and Jane primers were intended to work together to help young readers understand the story. The texts introduce a repetitive pattern of words; the illustrations provide visual reinforcements to help convey the meaning of the words. The simple but distinctive illustrations for the books were done by artists Eleanor Campbell and Keith Ward. Robert Childress did the illustrations during the 1950s. Richard Wiley took over the illustrations in the 1960s. The Dick and Jane beginning readers became well known for their simple narrative text and watercolor illustrations. Because the primers were intended for nationwide distribution, the text and illustrations intentionally lacked references to specific regional geographical features such as mountains, rivers, lakes, plains, or the seashore.

== Books published in the series ==
- Grade 1 – Before We Read, We Look and See, We Work and Play, We Come and Go, Guess Who, Fun with Dick and Jane, Go, Go, Go, and Our New Friends
- Grade 2 – Friends and Neighbors and More Friends and Neighbors
- Grade 3 – Streets and Roads, More Streets and Roads, Roads to Follow, and More Roads to Follow
- Transitional 3/4 – Just Imagine
- Grade 4 – Times and Places
- Grade 5 – Days and Deeds
- Grade 6 – People and Progress
- Grade 7 – Paths and Pathfinders; Parades
- Grade 8 – Wonders and Workers; Panoramas
- Grade 9 – Helpful in Ways

Scott Foresman made changes in their readers in the 1960s in an effort to keep the stories relevant, updating the series every five years.

In 1965, Scott Foresman became the first publisher to introduce an African American family as characters in a first-grade reader series. The family includes two parents and their three children: a son, Mike, and twin daughters, Pam and Penny.

In 1967, two years after Scott Foresman retired the Dick and Jane series, the company launched its Open Highways series, which includes heavily illustrated classic children's stories and poems, as well as placing greater emphasis on multicultural content and phonics training in its subsequent readers.

== Adaptations ==
The Dick and Jane readers inspired other publishers to adopt a similar format, but Scott Foresman's Dick and Jane series were the market leaders until the early 1960s, In Catholic editions of the 1940s, 1950s, and 1960s series (including the Cathedral Basic Readers and the New Cathedral Basic Readers), the "Sally", "Dick", and "Jane" characters were renamed "Judy", "John", and "Jean" to reflect the names of Catholic saints. Another series, published by Ginn and Company, featuree characters named "David" and "Ann". Groups of stories in each book were replaced by Catholic-oriented stories of the saints or portrayed moral choices. Some 1960s grade-level readers also have Seventh-day Adventist versions that use the 1965 multi-ethnic characters with revised book title. For example, Now We Read became Friends to Know and Fun Wherever We Are became Places to Know. W. J. Gage published British English language versions in Canada with appropriate spelling changes. In lower grades French language versions also were issued in the 1950s in Canada, with the main characters renamed Jeanne, Paul, and Lise in these editions.

== Teaching methodology ==
For three decades (roughly 1940 to 1970), the whole-word or look-say method (also called sight reading) on which the Dick and Jane readers were based remained the dominant reading method in American schools. Phonics-based reading methods came into fashion in the 1970s. The whole-language movement developed in the 1980s. Other methods were also in use for shorter periods before they were replaced as well. The look-say method used a controlled vocabulary and taught readers to memorize the words through repetition, placing less emphasis on teaching phonics Texts in the Dick and Jane readers repeated words within phrases such as "'Oh, oh!' said Jane. 'It is Baby!' 'It is Baby!' said Dick. Baby said, 'See, see! Pretty, pretty kitten.' Dick and Jane laughed. 'Funny, funny Baby,' said Dick." Teacher's guides accompanying the texts also encouraged adoption of the whole-word (look-say) method of identifying the meaning of words from the illustrations and repeating words introduced in the text.

For this reason, the Dick and Jane readers came to be used less and less as studies supported systematic phonics as a more effective method of developing foundational literacy skills.

== Criticisms ==
According to the history of the Institute for Juvenile Research, psychologist Marion Monroe developed methods for early childhood reading programs, which led to the Dick and Jane stories.

In a 1986 interview, Dr. Seuss said, "I think one of the happiest things I've done is getting rid of Dick and Jane". In a 2006 interview, George R. R. Martin criticized Dick and Jane and credited comic books for sparking his childhood interest in reading:

I often think comic books were the things that made me a reader. You learn to read in school with Dick and Jane, but the Dick and Jane stuff was so dull! (Laughs) Run, Dick, run. See Spot run. You know, the stories were stupid, even for a first or second grader. Years later I saw some of the famous McGuffey readers, go back further, things that my mother's generation would read from in the 1930s or 1920s, and those things were filled with real stories from real writers that the kids were learning. But my generation, the baby boomers, we had Dick and Jane, and that couldn't convince me to keep reading. But Batman and Superman could: they were much more interesting than Dick and Jane. And when I found comic books I loved them and continued to read those for years.

=== Impact on students ===
For decades, critics and advocates continued to debate the impact of the sight reading method and the primers that used it. Samuel T. Orton, a neuropathologist, warned educators in his article published in the February 1929 issue of the Journal of Educational Psychology that the look-say method would lead to reading disability. In Why Johnny Can't Read (1955), author Rudolf Flesch concluded that the whole-word (look-say) method was ineffective because it lacked phonics training. In addition, Flesch was critical of the simple stories and limited text and vocabulary in the Dick-and-Jane-style readers that taught students to read through word memorization. Flesch and other critics also believed that the look-say method did not properly prepare students to read more complex materials in the upper grade levels. Arther Trace also criticized the Dick and Jane series in his book, Reading Without Dick and Jane (1965). In 2002, author Samuel L. Blumenfeld, a supporter of teaching reading skills with phonics reading, argued that the Dick and Jane series and others that used the whole-word, look-say, or sight-reading method caused poor reading skills among the millions of American students who learned to read using this method. Harold Henderson asserted in his book Let's Kill Dick and Jane (2006) that the series focused on trivial aspects of reading and left children far behind their peers in Europe.

=== Bias and stereotypes ===
In the late 1950s and early 1960s, critics of the Dick and Jane readers began to point out its stereotypes; class, gender, and racial bias; and errors in content and illustrations. Critics objected to the Dick and Jane storylines and stereotyped roles, arguing that "many students could not relate to family with two children, a dog named Spot, and a cat named Puff." Increasing social changes, including the civil rights movement in the 1960s and efforts to include a stronger presentation of other races and cultures in classroom texts, made the white, middle-class characters of "Dick and Jane seem increasingly irrelevant to some." Zerna Sharp, who created and edited the characters countered the readers' harsh criticisms with the reply, "That's all an adult's viewpoint."

== Collectibles and reprint editions ==
The primers that made the characters of "Dick", "Jane", and "Sally" household words have become icons of mid-century American culture, as well as collector's items.

== In popular culture ==
=== Cartoons ===
- In a Calvin and Hobbes cartoon, Calvin writes a book report titled "The Dynamics of Interbeing and Monological Imperatives in Dick and Jane: A Study in Psychic Transrelational Gender Modes".
- In a Far Side cartoon, a wolf mother reads a book called The Predator Primer to her child. The caption describes how Dick and Jane are running from a wolf in the book.

=== Films ===
- Fun with Dick and Jane (1977) and its 2005 remake refer to Fun with Dick and Jane, the title of the Grade 1 book in the reading series. The movies are about two lovable con artists who happen to share the names of the literary characters, and the 1977 version opens with a display of a picture book that spoofs a typical Dick and Jane volume.
- One sequence of Disney's animated feature film Tarzan (1999) that is set to music features a book with a page that says, "See Jane, See Jane Run."
- The title of See Spot Run is based on a line in the books.

=== Literature ===
- Marc Gallant's illustrated parody book, More Fun with Dick and Jane (1986), shows the characters as grown-ups.
- Yiddish With Dick and Jane is a 2004 Yiddish primer featuring the characters as adults dealing with issues such as adultery and drug use. Although the book called itself a parody, its publisher Little, Brown was sued by Dick and Jane copyright holders Pearson Education.
- Nobel Prize-winner Toni Morrison invents her own version of a Dick and Jane text in the opening chapter of her 1970 novel The Bluest Eye, and the text is repeated with variations throughout the book to signify on the idyllic white family in their suburban setting, juxtaposing it with black families living in poverty in 1940, years after the Great Depression.

=== Music ===
- Gil Scott-Heron referenced Dick and Jane in his 1971 song "The Revolution Will Not Be Televised".
- Bobby Vinton recorded a song titled "Dick and Jane" for his 1974 album Melodies of Love. The song was released as a single in 1975 and reached #33 on the Billboard Hot 100.
- The band Human Sexual Response referenced the characters and style of the books in the song "Dick and Jane", from their EP Fig. 14 (1980).
- The band Hawaiian Pups spoofed the characters in the song "Baby Judy", from their EP Split Second Precision (1983).
- Musician JG Thirlwell has a song called "See Dick Run", recorded under his Foetus alias, which references the two titular characters.

=== Television ===
- In a 1963 episode of The Adventures of Rocky and Bullwinkle, Wossamotta U, the most pathetically backward university in America, has Dick and Jane at the Seashore as the center of its required reading course.
- The PBS children's television series Between the Lions does a spoof of the books entitled Fun with Chicken Jane.
- Singer Bobby Vinton recorded a song in the 1970s entitled "Dick and Jane".
- In The Simpsons episode "They Saved Lisa's Brain", the Comic Book Guy's T-shirt reads "C:/DOS C:/DOS/RUN RUN/DOS/RUN", similar to the catch phrases in the book series.
- 3rd Rock from the Sun (1996–2001), a sitcom revolving around a man named Dick Solomon, often has episode titles based on book/movie titles or popular sayings, sometimes with the names of the show's characters added in. Dick and Jane are the source for a number of these - e.g., "See Dick Run," "See Dick Continue to Run," "Fun with Dick and Janet," etc.

== Public exhibitions ==
The Dick and Jane readers were featured in an exhibition at Lakeview Museum of Arts and Sciences in Peoria, Illinois, in 1994 and at the Richmond Public Library in Richmond, Indiana, in 1997.

== See also ==
- Alice and Jerry
- Ant and Bee
- Janet and John
- Janet and Mark
- Key Words Reading Scheme's Peter and Jane
- McGuffey Readers
- Mr. Mugs
- Science Research Associates
- Why Johnny Can't Read
