= Childress, Goochland County, Virginia =

Unincorporated community in Virginia, United States

Childress, Virginia
- Unincorporated community
- Location within Virginia Location within the United States
- Coordinates: 37°49′16″N 77°59′04″W
- Country: United States
- State: Virginia
- County: Goochland
- Elevation: 374 ft (114 m)
- Time zone: UTC-5 (Eastern (EST))
  - Summer (DST): UTC-4 (EDT)
- Area code: 804
- GNIS feature ID: 1674251

Childress is an unincorporated community in Goochland County, Virginia, United States. Childress is 10.9 miles (17.5 km) north-northwest of Goochland.
