= Andy Sabados =

American football player (1916–2004)

No. 38
- Position: Guard

Personal information
- Born: November 24, 1916; Aurora, Illinois, U.S.
- Died: July 5, 2004 (aged 87); Mundelein, Illinois, U.S.
- Listed height: 5 ft 11 in (1.80 m)
- Listed weight: 209 lb (95 kg)

Career information
- High school: East (Aurora)
- College: The Citadel (1935–1938)
- NFL draft: 1939: 13th round, 111th overall pick

Career history
- Chicago Cardinals (1939–1940)

Career NFL statistics
- Games played: 18
- Games started: 12
- Stats at Pro Football Reference

Andrew Alex Sabados (November 24, 1916 – July 5, 2004) was an American professional football player who was a guard for two seasons with the Chicago Cardinals of the National Football League (NFL). He was selected by the Cardinals in the thirteenth round of the 1939 NFL draft after playing college football for The Citadel Bulldogs.

== Early life ==
Andrew Alex Sabados was born on November 24, 1916, in Aurora, Illinois. He attended East Aurora High School in Aurora.

== College career ==
Sabados played college football for The Citadel Bulldogs of the Citadel Military College of South Carolina. He was on the freshman team in 1935 and was a three-year letterman from 1936 to 1938. He was captain, an All-State selection and SoCon Jacobs Blocking Award winner his senior year in 1938. He was also captain of the track team at The Citadel. Sabados was inducted into The Citadel's athletics hall of fame in 1983.

== Professional career ==
Sabados was selected by the Chicago Cardinals in the 13th round, with the 111th overall pick, of the 1939 NFL draft. He signed with the team on May 16, 1939. He played in eight games, starting six, during the 1939 season, and 10 games, starting six, during the 1940 season.

== Personal life ==
Sabados died on July 5, 2004, in Mundelein, Illinois.
