= Ruth Strang =

American psychologist

- Born: April 3, 1895; Chatham, New Jersey
- Died: January 1971 (aged 75); Amityville, New York

Ruth May Strang (April 3, 1895 – January 1971) was an American psychologist whose primary research interests were in child and adolescent psychology.

== Career ==
Strang attended Adelphi Academy from which she graduated in 1914. She went on to study at the Pratt Institute until 1916 before completing a degree and PhD in education at Columbia University. After holding a number of temporary teaching positions Strang was appointed assistant professor of education at Columbia University. She became a full professor in 1940. In 1946 Strang and Pauline Williamson founded the American Association for Gifted Children, through which she published guidelines for parents, teachers, and students. In 1955 Strang served as president of the National Association of Remedial Teachers.

Her primary research areas were child and adolescent psychology, but she also worked in areas related to the improvement of reading. Over the course of her life Strang authored hundreds of scientific papers and 36 books.

Strang was a fellow of the American Psychological Association, the American Association for the Advancement of Science, an Associate Fellow (induction date of 1953) in the prestigious National Academy of Kinesiology (formerly American Academy of Physical Education; American Academy of Kinesiology and Physical Education)., and after her death the National Association for Women in Education created a Ruth Strang award for students and researchers in the area of women's studies.

== Personal life ==
Strang was born in Chatham, New Jersey on 3 April 1895 to Anna Bergen and Charles Garrett Strang. She had two brothers and never married. Strang suffered from arteriosclerosis in her later years and died in Amityville in January 1971.
