= West Aurora Public School District 129 =

School district in Illinois, United States

West Aurora Public School District 129 is a unit school district in southeastern Kane County, Illinois. The present "West Side" school district covers the city of Aurora, Illinois with an eastern boundary of the Fox River, a southern boundary of the Kane County and Kendall County line, a western boundary of Aurora's city limits, and a northern boundary of the village limits of North Aurora, Illinois. Students from Aurora, North Aurora, Montgomery, Illinois and Sugar Grove, Illinois attend West Aurora schools.

District 129 has a tradition in Aurora going back to the 1860s. The West Side High School and East Side High School have played an annual football game against each other since 1893. Four of the current elementary buildings are reported to be four of the oldest still in use in Aurora and in Kane County. Mary Todd school was constructed as Oak Street school, on the ruins of a prior building, and was built by the Works Progress Administration (WPA) in the 1930s. Its interior still features WPA murals and sculpture. Joseph Freeman Elementary School was dedicated in 1928. Abraham Lincoln Elementary (decommissioned in 2009), was originally the Lake Street School, and Nancy Hill Elementary, originally the Illinois Avenue School, are over a century old.

Two other school buildings exist on the historic sites of original school buildings. The Montgomery Elementary School was built in 1891. The present Nicholson Elementary, itself built in the 1950s and 1960s, replaced the Montgomery Elementary building on the same site. The original Galena Street School was built in 1895. It was renamed Greenman Elementary in 1915, and was replaced by a new building, constructed on an adjacent lot, in 2004.

West Side District 129 absorbed the former North Aurora School District #51 in the early 1960s, constructing Schneider Elementary in that village's east side in 1963, and Goodwin Elementary (as a replacement for the former North Aurora School, which stood at the corner of State Street and Lincolnway in North Aurora until it was demolished in 2015), in 1968.

The West Side District is the only one of the three major districts serving Aurora to own and operate its own fleet of School Buses: Indian Prairie School District has a contract agreement with Laidlaw and East Side District 131 does not operate any school buses).

== Elementary schools ==
School's name	School's namesake	Location	Mascot	Colors	Principal	Year opened
Early Learning Academy		Aurora			Laurie Klamhous	2019
Fearn Elementary	Harold G. Fearn, former Superintendent of Schools	North Aurora	Falcons	Red & Black	Dave Russell	2001
Freeman Elementary	Captain Joseph Hewett Freeman, former Superintendent of Schools, former Illinois State Superintendent of Schools	Aurora	Mustangs	Maroon & Gold	Jana Ream	1928
Goodwin Elementary	Lucia Goodwin, former teacher	North Aurora	Eagles	Royal & Gold	Bob Halverson	1968
Greenman Elementary (originally Galena Street School)	A. V. Greenman, former superintendent	Aurora	Lions	Kelly & White	Cliff Englishharden	1895, original building — 2004, current building
Hall Elementary	Frank Haven Hall, former superintendent	Aurora	Huskies	Royal & White	Cherie Esposito	1960
Hill Elementary (originally Pennsylvania Avenue School)	Nancy Hill, former teacher and principal	Aurora	Hawks	Royal & Gold	Michael S. Smith	1888
Lincoln Elementary (originally Lake Street School)	Abraham Lincoln	Aurora	Lynx	Red & Grey	N/A	1892 - 2009
McCleery Elementary	Wayne McCleery, former superintendent	Aurora	Mustangs	Red & Black	Dan Ulrich	1957
Nicholson Elementary (originally Montgomery Elementary School)	Grace Nicholson, former teacher	Montgomery	Eagles	Red & White	Jennifer Bernal	1891, original building — 1953/1962, current building
Schneider Elementary	J. P. Schneider, early settler for whom Schneider's Mill/Schneider's Crossing was named before it was renamed North Aurora	North Aurora	Bulldogs	Red & White	Olivia Smith	1963
Smith Elementary	Gertrude Scott Smith, former teacher	Aurora	Super Star	Royal & Gold	Pete Clabough	1963
Todd Early Childhood Center (originally Oak Street School)	Mary Todd, former teacher	Aurora	Spelling Bees	N/A	N/A	1934-2019

== Middle schools ==
School's name	School's namesake	Location	Mascot	Colors	Principal	Year opened
Herget Middle School	Robert Herget, former teacher, Principal and Associate Superintendent	North Aurora	Huskie	Royal & White	Cindy Larry	2005
Jefferson Middle School	Thomas Jefferson (president)	Aurora	J-Hawks (stands for Junior Blackhawks, after the West High Blackhawks)	Royal & White	Jeffrey Bryant	1956
Jewel Middle School	Gary D. Jewel, former teacher and superintendent	North Aurora	Jaguar	Red & white	Michael S. Smith	1998
Washington Middle School	George Washington	Aurora	Generals	Navy & Red	Tom Davidson	1964

== High school ==
School's name	Location	Mascot	Colors	Principal	Year opened
West Aurora High School	Aurora	Blackhawks	Red & Blue	Dr. Charles Hiscock	1867, original high school — 1905, second location (still standing) — 1953, current location

== Special Education ==
School's name	School's namesake	Location	Mascot	Principal	Year opened
Hope D. Wall School (run in cooperation with East Side District 131)	Hope D. Wall, special education teacher	Aurora	Rockets	Terry Collette	1969
