= Scott Foresman =

Former educational publisher

- Parent company: Savvas Learning Company
- Founded: 1896; 130 years ago
- Country of origin: United States
- Headquarters location: Northbrook, Illinois
- Publication types: Textbooks
- Official website: savvas.com

Scott Foresman was an elementary educational publisher for PreK through Grade 6 in all subject areas. Its titles are now owned by Savvas Learning Company which was formed from former Pearson Education K12 division. The former Glenview headquarters of Scott Foresman was empty as of August 2020; Crain's Chicago Business reported that the broker hired to sell the property had missed a mortgage payment.

== Company history ==
Scott Foresman and Company was founded in 1896 by Erastus Howard Scott, editor and president; Hugh A. Foresman, salesman and secretary; and his brother, William Coates Foresman, treasurer. However, the company's origins extend back several years earlier. E. H. Scott started in business in 1889, when he and C. J. Albert of the Albert Teachers Agency formed a partnership, "Albert and Scott". During this early period, the company occupied less than 100 square feet (9.3 m^{2}) in an office on Wabash Avenue in Chicago, Illinois. The company’s first publication was Bellum Helveticum (1889), a high school Latin textbook. In 1894, Hugh Foresman purchased Albert's interest in the publishing company and joined E. H. Scott. The following year, the Albert and Scott corporation purchased the publishing business, rights, and stock of George Sherwood and Company, which also published textbooks. Also in 1895, the firm moved its business to larger quarters at 307 S. Wabash Avenue in Chicago. On February 13, 1896, W. Coates Foresman joined the business and the corporation's name was changed to Scott, Foresman and Company. That same year, the young company purchased S. C. Griggs and Company, whose catalogue included a long list of miscellaneous books, including Robert’s Rules of Order. When the company had been in business for only one year, it secured its first large state adoption. In 1897, the state of Kansas awarded Scott, Foresman and Company a five-year contract for eight publications. The following year, the firm moved to 623 South Wabash Avenue. In 1898, Hugh Foresman was elected vice president. At this time, the company decided to publish books in the elementary field. In 1908 it recruited R. C. McNamara as office manager from Princeton University who ran a cooperative store at Princeton which became the University Store. The business plan of the U-Store today is essentially the same one that he devised in 1905 at age 24. In the late 1920s and early 1930s, William Scott Gray (1885–1960), director of the Curriculum Foundation Series at Scott Foresman, co-authored with William H. Elson the Elson Basic Readers (renamed the Elson-Gray Basic Readers in 1936), which Scott Foresman published in Chicago. Zerna Sharp, a reading consultant and textbook editor for Scott Foresman, worked with Gray to develop what became the publisher's series of Dick and Jane readers. Sharp named and developed the characters of "Dick" and "Jane" who made their debut in the Elson-Gray Readers in 1930 and continued in a subsequent series of beginning readers after the Elson-Gray series ended in 1940. Gray wrote and Eleanor B. Campbell did most of the illustrations for the early Dick and Jane readers, while Sharp selected and edited the storylines, and supervised production of the series. The Dick and Jane series of primers monopolized the market for nearly four decades and reached the height of their popularity in the 1950s, when 80 percent of first-grade students in the United States were learning to read though the Dick and Jane stories. In the 1965 edition, the last of the Dick and Jane series, Scott Foresman introduced the first African American family as characters in a first-grade reader. In the 1970s and 1980s, the series was replaced with other reading texts. Scott, Foresman became a public corporation as SFN Companies and was listed on the New York Stock Exchange. William Morrow and Company and South-Western Publishing were acquired by Scott, Foresman in 1967. Morrow was sold to the Hearst Corporation in 1981. SFN was taken private in a leveraged buyout in 1985. In 1986, Time Inc. bought Scott, Foresman and International Thomson bought South-Western. Around that time the comma was dropped from the company's name. Three years later, Time sold Scott Foresman to HarperCollins, the book publishing subsidiary of News Corporation. In 1996, News Corp sold the brand to Pearson PLC, the global publisher and owner of Penguin and the Financial Times. Then Scott Foresman, along with more than 100 other educational brands, merged to become Pearson, with Scott Foresman adopting the new name, Pearson Scott Foresman. In February 2019, Pearson spun off its US-based K-12 courseware business, which was renamed Pearson K12 Learning. The newly independent K-12 publishing company later rebranded as Savvas Learning Company in May 2020. The trademark registration for Scott Foresman is now owned by Savvas Learning Company. In 2007, Pearson Scott Foresman donated 16 boxes of illustrations to the Wikimedia Foundation, donating them into the public domain in the process.
