= Sight word =

Commonly used words that children are encouraged to memorize

High frequency sight words (also known simply as sight words) are commonly used words that young children are encouraged to memorize as a whole by sight, so that they can automatically recognize these words in print without having to use any strategies to decode. Sight words were introduced after whole language (a similar method) fell out of favor with the education establishment.

The term sight words is often confused with sight vocabulary, which is defined as each person's own vocabulary that the person recognizes from memory without the need to decode for understanding.

However, some researchers say that two of the most significant problems with sight words are: (1) memorizing sight words is labour intensive, requiring on average about 35 trials per word, and (2) teachers who withhold phonics instruction and instead rely on teaching sight words are making it harder for children to "gain basic word-recognition skills" that are critically needed by the end of grade three and can be used over a lifetime of reading.

== Rationale ==
Sight words account for a large percentage (up to 75%) of the words used in beginning children's print materials. The advantage for children being able to recognize sight words automatically is that a beginning reader will be able to identify the majority of words in a beginning text before they even attempt to read it; therefore, allowing the child to concentrate on meaning and comprehension as they read without having to stop and decode every single word. Advocates of whole-word instruction believe that being able to recognize a large number of sight words gives students a better start to learning to read.

Recognizing sight words automatically is said to be advantageous for beginning readers because many of these words have unusual spelling patterns, cannot be sounded out using basic phonics knowledge and cannot be represented using pictures. For example, the word "was" does not follow a usual spelling pattern, as the middle letter "a" makes an /ɒ~ʌ/ sound and the final letter "s" makes a /z/ sound, nor can the word be associated with a picture clue since it denotes an abstract state (existence). Another example is the word "said". It breaks the phonetic rule that ai normally makes the long a sound, ay. In this word it makes the short e sound of eh. The word "said" is pronounced as /s/ /e/ /d/. The word "has" also breaks the phonetic rule of s normally making the sss sound, in this word the s makes the z sound, /z/." The word is then pronounced /h/ /a/ /z/.

However, a 2017 study in England compared teaching with phonics vs. teaching whole written words and concluded that phonics is more effective, saying "our findings suggest that interventions aiming to improve the accuracy of reading aloud and/or comprehension in the early stages of learning should focus on the systematicities present in print-to-sound relationships, rather than attempting to teach direct access to the meanings of whole written words".

Most advocates of sight-words believe children should memorize the words. However, some educators say a more efficient method is to teach them by using an explicit phonics approach, perhaps by using a tool such as Elkonin boxes. As a result, the words form part of the students sight vocabulary, are readily accessible and aid in learning other words containing similar sounds.

Other phonics advocates, such as the Common Core State Standards Initiative (CCSSI-USA), the Departments of Education in England, and the State of Victoria in Australia, recommend that teachers first begin by teaching children the frequent sounds and the simple spellings, then introduce the less frequent sounds and more complex spellings later (e.g. the sounds /s/ and /t/ before /v/ and /w/; and the spellings cake before eight and cat before duck). The following are samples of the lists that are available on the CCSSI-USA site:

Phoneme	Sample only - Word Examples (Consonants) (CCSSI-USA)	Common Graphemes (Spellings)
/m/	mitt, comb, hymn	m, mb, mn
/t/	tickle, mitt, sipped	t, tt, ed
/n/	nice, knight, gnat	n, kn, gn
/k/	cup, kite, duck, chorus, folk, quiet	k, c, ck, ch, lk, q
/f/	fluff, sphere, tough, calf	f, ff, gh, ph, lf
/s/	sit, pass, science, psychic	s, ss, sc, ps
/z/	zoo, jazz, nose, as, xylophone	z, zz, se, s, x
/sh/	shoe, mission, sure, charade, precious, notion, mission, special	sh, ss, s, ch, sc, ti, si, ci
/zh/	measure, azure	s, z
/r/	reach, wrap, her, fur, stir	r, wr, er/ur/ir
/h/	house, whole	h, wh

Phoneme	Sample only - Word Examples (Vowels) (CCSSI-USA)	Common Graphemes (Spellings)
/ā/	make, rain, play, great, baby, eight, vein, they	a_e, ai, ay, ea, -y, eigh, ei, ey
/ē/	see, these, me, eat, key, happy, chief, either	ee, e_e, -e, ea, ey, -y, ie, ei
/ī/	time, pie, cry, right, rifle	i_e, ie, -y, igh, -I
/ō/	vote, boat, toe, snow, open	o_e, oa, oe, ow, o-
/ū/	use, few, cute	u, ew, u_e
/ă/	cat	a
/ĕ/	bed, breath	e, ea
/ĭ/	sit, gym	i, y
/ŏ/	fox, swap, palm	o, (w)a, al
/ŭ/	cup, cover, flood, tough	u, o, oo, ou
/aw/	saw, pause, call, water, bought	aw, au, al, (w)a, ough
/er/	her, fur, sir	er, ur, ir

== Word lists ==
A number of sight word lists have been compiled and published; among the most popular are the Dolch sight words (first published in 1936) and the 1000 Instant Word list prepared in 1979 by Edward Fry, professor of Education and Director of the Reading Center at Rutgers University and Loyola University in Los Angeles. Many commercial products are also available. These lists have similar attributes, as they all aim to divide words into levels which are prioritized and introduced to children according to frequency of appearance in beginning readers' texts. Although many of the lists have overlapping content, the order of frequency of sight words varies and can be disputed, as they depend on contexts such as geographical location, empirical data, samples used, and year of publication. last edited: 8/19/25

== Criticism ==
Research shows that the alphabetic principle is seen as "the primary driver" of development of all aspects of printed word recognition including phonic rules and sight vocabulary." In addition, the use of sight words as a reading instructional strategy is not consistent with the dual route theory as it involves out-of-context memorization rather than the development of phonological skills. Instead, it is suggested that children first learn to identify individual letter-sound correspondences before blending and segmenting letter combinations.

Proponents of systematic phonics and synthetic phonics argue that children must first learn to associate the sounds of their language with the letter(s) that are used to represent them, and then to blend those sounds into words, and that children should never memorize words as visual designs. Using sight words as a method of teaching reading in English is seen as being at odds with the alphabetic principle and treating English as though it was a logographic language (e.g. Chinese or Japanese).

Some notable researchers have clearly stated their disapproval of whole language and whole-word teaching. In his 2009 book, Reading in the brain, French cognitive neuroscientist Stanislas Dehaene wrote, "cognitive psychology directly refutes any notion of teaching via a 'global' or 'whole language' method." He goes on to talk about "the myth of whole-word reading", saying it has been refuted by recent experiments. "We do not recognize a printed word through a holistic grasping of its contours, because our brain breaks it down into letters and graphemes." Another cognitive neuroscientist, Mark Seidenberg, says that learning to sound-out atypical words such as have (/h/-/a/-/v/) helps the student to read other words such as had, has, having, hive, haven't, etc. because of the sounds they have in common.

== See also ==
- Dolch word list
- Dual-route hypothesis to reading aloud
- Fry readability formula
- Learning to read
- Literacy
- Most common words in English
- Phonics
- Reading comprehension
- Reading education in the United States
- Reading (process)
- Subvocalization
- Teaching reading: whole language and phonics
- Whole language
- Writing system
