= Elkonin boxes =

Educational method

Elkonin boxes are an instructional method used in the early elementary grades especially in children with reading difficulties and inadequate responders in order to build phonemic awareness by segmenting words into individual sounds. They are named after D.B. Elkonin, the Russian psychologist who pioneered their use. The "boxes" are squares drawn on a piece of paper or a chalkboard, with one box for each sound or phoneme. To use Elkonin boxes, a child listens to a word and moves a token into a box for each sound or phoneme. In some cases different colored tokens may be used for consonants and vowels or just for each phoneme in the word.
