= East Aurora Public School District 131 =

School district in Illinois, United States

East Aurora Public School District 131 (also known as Aurora Public Schools: East Side) is a public school district serving preschool through high school students in Aurora, Illinois, United States. It is considered the state's first public school district.

According to the 2016 Illinois State Report Card, the district had a total enrollment of 14,659 students. There are 12 elementary schools, three middle schools, one magnet academy (grades three through eight), two early childhood centers and East Aurora High School, all within Aurora city limits. The superintendent of East Aurora School District 131 is Dr. Jennifer Norrell. The school board president is Annette Johnson.

The district is bounded by the county line between DuPage County and Kane County to the east, the county line between Kendall County and Kane County to the south, the Fox River to the west, and the border with the neighboring West Aurora and Batavia School Districts to the north.

== History ==
According to "The Educational History of Illinois", private subscription schools were taught by various teachers on the East Side starting in 1834. The first school in what would later become East Aurora School District 131 opened in 1836 at East Galena and Broadway. The school was subscription based. In 1839, a new school was built near Broadway and Claim Street.

East Aurora became a charter district on April 30, 1847, and was officially recognized by the state in 1851. The district became the first free school system in Illinois under a special act of legislature in 1851, two years before the state's free school laws passed. That same year, a two-story school was built with Merwin Tabor as principal. The first grade schools were built four years later.

The first class from East Aurora High School graduated in 1867. In 1878, East Aurora High School formed the first high school orchestra in the country. The first kindergarten opened in 1890 and, in 1903, the district started a school for deaf children.

There are several East Aurora School District 131 schools that no longer exist, including: New York Street School (1851-1864), Center School (1866-1957), First Indian Creek School (1870-1899), Indian Creek School (1899-1957), D.W. Young School (1875-1956), First Oak Park School (1887-1923) and Marion Avenue School (1889-1929).

== District information ==
According to the 2016 Illinois state report cards, there were 14,659 students enrolled in East Aurora School District 131. Of those students, 86.6 percent were Hispanic, 7.7 percent were black, 3.2 percent were white, .6 percent were Asian, .4 percent were American Indian and 1.4 percent were categorized as one or more races.

According to the 2016 Illinois state report cards, 62.7 percent of East Aurora School District 131 students were considered low income and 34.3 percent had limited English proficiency. One-third receive bilingual services.

== Elementary schools ==
School	School's namesake	Team name	Colors	Principal	Year opened
Allen Elementary	Olney C. Allen, former Kane County judge and school board member	Panthers	Royal and white	Walter Ornelas	1951
Bardwell Elementary	Conrad Bardwell, superintendent 1896-1928	Bears	Forest green and white	Catherine Cohoon	1929
Beaupre Elementary	William S. Beaupre, banker and school board member from 1882-1927	Pumas	Royal and gold	Lirio Ramirez	1916
Benavides STEAM Academy	Anne Garcia Benavides, former East Aurora principal, administrator	Bengals	Orange and blue	Patricia Rangel	2014
Brady Elementary	Lorenzo D. Brady, Illinois legislator, mayor and East school trustee	Bobcats	Blue and white	Elizabeth Vivanco	1923
Dieterich Elementary	George N. Dieterich, former school board president	Bobcats	Royal and white	Lauren Cunningham	1922
Gates Elementary	John W. Gates, former superintendent	Tigers	Red and black	Fatima Ballesteros	1956
Hermes Elementary	Nicholas A. Hermes, school board member	Panthers	Red and white	Kelly Hills	1956
Johnson Elementary	Clifford I. Johnson, pharmacist and school board member	Jaguars	Kelly and gold	Ines Sem	1956
Krug Elementary	Rose E. Krug, East Aurora nurse, World War I veteran	Cougars	Royal and white	Claire Landsford	1965
Oak Park Elementary	School was originally surrounded by oak trees	Tigers	Purple and white	Annette McMahon	1924
O'Donnell Elementary	Mable O'Donnell, East reading supervisor and nationally published author	Bobcats	Royal and gold	Tonetta Davis	1965
Rollins Elementary	Edna Rollins, director of finance and administrative services	Cougars	Red and gold	Stephanie Schmieising	1990

== Middle schools ==
School	School's namesake	Team name	Colors	Principal	Year opened
Cowherd Middle School	Henry Cowherd, Aurora resident and East High class of 1945	Cougars	Royal and orange	Jacqueline Gibson	1992
Simmons Middle School	Clifton F. Simmons, former school board president and East High quarterback	Panthers	Black and white	Nelson Granadillo	1961
Waldo Middle School	K.D. Waldo, former superintendent of East Aurora 131	Wildcats	Red and white	Eileen Roberts	1912

== High schools ==
School	Team name	Colors	Principal	Year opened
East Aurora High School	Tomcats	Red and black	Jennifer Mitchell	1957 (current building)
East Aurora Extension Campus	Tomcats	Red and black	Taveras Crump	2014

== Magnet academy ==
School	School's namesake	Team name	Principal	Year opened
Fred Rodgers Magnet Academy	Fred Rodgers, longtime community activist	Puma	Brian Valek	2013 (current building)

== Early childhood centers ==
School's name	School's namesake	Principal
Early Childhood Center	N/A	Kathleen Kogut
Child Service Center	N/A	N/A

== Special education ==
School	School's namesake	Team name	Principal	Year opened
Hope D. Wall School (run in cooperation with West Aurora Public School District 129)	Hope D. Wall, special education teacher	Rockets	Dr. Terry Collette	1969
