= Basal reader =

Book used to teach reading to children

Basal readers are textbooks used to teach reading and associated skills to schoolchildren. Commonly called "reading books" or "readers" they are usually published as anthologies that combine previously published short stories, excerpts of longer narratives, and original works. A standard basal series comes with individual identical books for students, a Teacher's Edition of the book, and a collection of workbooks, assessments, and activities.

== Description ==
Basal readers usually are well organized. Stories are chosen to illustrate and develop specific skills, which are taught in a pre-determined sequence. Often, new words are introduced, and then reinforced, in a very deliberate sequence to build the student’s reading vocabulary.

The teacher's editions are also tightly organized, containing much more than the answer key to the questions that usually appear at the end of each reading passage. The teacher's book also contains suggestions for pre-reading and post-reading activities and assessments, as well as scripted questions to ask students at specific points in a story. The teacher’s editions usually seek to make it easier for the teacher to present, reinforce, and test the reading skills covered in the corresponding student book and student workbook.

== History ==
Basal readers have been in use in the United States since the mid-1860s, beginning with a series called the McGuffey Readers. In the McGuffey Readers, the first book focused on teaching Phonics thoroughly, while later readers introduced other vocabulary, including non-phonetic “sight words”. This was the first reader published with the idea of having one text for each grade level.

Since then, teaching methodologies in school basals have shifted regularly. The Scott Foresman Company published what is perhaps the most famous basal series, whose stories starred two children named Dick and Jane. Dick and Jane books emphasized memorizing words on sight, a method which came to be known as "look and say". The competing Alice and Jerry readers also used the “look and say” method. This philosophy came under attack in the late 1950s, largely due to Rudolf Flesch's book Why Johnny Can't Read. This was a scathing condemnation of the "look say" method, and advocated a return to programs that stressed teaching phonics to beginning readers.

During the 1970s and early 1980s, the pendulum did swing back toward a more phonics-based approach. During the latter part of the 1980s, basal usage declined as reading programs began to turn to whole language and so-called balanced reading programs that relied more heavily on trade books, rather than textbooks. The 1990s and early years of the 21st century have seen a renewed interest in skills acquisition which has sparked a resurgence in basal dominance.

== Benefits ==
The highly planned nature of basal readers is seen as one of their strengths, as this eases the load on teachers, particularly those who are inexperienced. Specific skills can be easily targeted, tested, and remediated. Those with very controlled vocabulary usage may ease difficulties for beginner or weak readers. Students who are reading below grade level will receive some benefits from using the on-level basal. The exposure will prepare them for state testing. Using a basal reader as a starting point for grade level reading allows educators to quickly assess student reading level. Basals are not meant to be the only resource a student uses, just the starting point.

== See also ==
Authors

- Joy Cowley
- Kate Harrington

Types

- Anthology
- Primer
- Graded readers
- Alphabet book

Education

- Extensive reading
- Phonics
- Reading education
- Whole language

Examples

- Alice and Jerry
- Dick and Jane
- Janet and John
- Peter and Jane
- Spot the Dog
- McGuffey Readers
- The New England Primer
- Al-Qiraa Al-Khaldouniya
- Alfubei Nwe
