= List of Eagle comic strips =

This is a list of comic strips printed within the pages of Eagle, a seminal British children's comic first published from 1950 to 1969

== 1950–1969 ==
=== Adventure ===
- "The Beast of Loch Craggon", illustrated by John McLusky (1962–64)
- "Blackbow the Cheyenne", written by Ted Cowan and illustrated by Victor de la Fuente, Frank Humphris, Don Lawrence
- "Can You Catch a Crook?'" illustrated by Victor de la Fuente, Paul Trevillion
- "Dan Dare", by Frank Hampson and others, 1950–1969
- "Danger Unlimited", illustrated by Martin Aitchison, 1962–63
- "The Devil's Henchmen", illustrated by Frank Humphris
- "For Bravery", written by Geoffrey Bond and illustrated by Cyril Holloway
- "Fraser of Africa", written by George Beardmore and illustrated by Frank Bellamy
- "The Guinea Pig", written by Willie Patterson, Tom Tully, David Motton, Bob Bartholomew, Frederick Smith, Alfred Wallace, illustrated by Colin Andrew, Gerald Haylock, Brian Lewis
- "Heros the Spartan", written by Tom Tully, illustrated by Frank Bellamy, Luis Bermejo
- "Home of the Wanderers", illustrated by Brian Lewis
- "The Iron Man", illustrated by Gerry Embleton, Martin Salvador
- "Jack O'Lantern", written by George Beardmore and illustrated by Robert Ayton and Cecil Langley Doughty, 1955–1959
- "Johnny Frog", illustrated by Ron Embleton
- "Knights of the Road", written by J. H. G. Freeman and illustrated by Gerald Haylock, 1960–62
- "Luck of the Legion", written by Geoffrey Bond and illustrated by Martin Aitchison, 1952–1961
- "Mann of Battle", illustrated by Brian Lewis
- ”Mark Question (The Boy with a future- but no past!)" Story by Alan Stranks, Drawn by Harry Lindfield First appeared in Eagle March 22, 1957 See also The Best of Eagle edited by Marcus Morris 1977 pages 121 to 128
- "Marvel of MI5", written by David Cameron and illustrated by Paddy Nevin
- "P.C. 49", written by Alan Stranks and illustrated by John Worsley
- "Riders of the Range (comic strip)", written by Charles Chilton and illustrated by Jack Daniel, Angus Scott, Frank Humphris, Giorgio Bellavitis, Brian Lewis, Ferdinando Tacconi 1950–62
- "Sky Buccaneers", illustrated by José Ortiz
- "Smokeman", written by Ted Cowan and illustrated by José Ortiz
- "Storm Nelson", illustrated by Richard Jennings and Giorgio Bellavitis
- "Tommy Walls", illustrated by Frank Hampson, Harold Johns, John Worsley, Richard Jennings
- "UFO Agent", written by Ted Cowan and illustrated by Paul Trevillion, José Ortiz
- "What's His Name?", illustrated by Dudley Pout

=== Humour ===
- "Blunderbirds"
- "Captain Pugwash" by John Ryan, 1950–51
- "Chicko", illustrated by Norman Thelwell
- "Cornelius Dimworthy"
- "Dimworthy and Co"
- "Harris Tweed" by John Ryan, 1950–62
- "Professor Puff and his dog Wuff"
- "Waldorf & Cecil"

=== Literary adaptations ===
- The Lost World, adaptation of the novel by Arthur Conan Doyle, illustrated by Martin Aitchison
- Condensed adaptation of three C. S. Forester novels, The Happy Return (1937), A Ship of the Line (1938) & Flying Colours (1938), illustrated by Martin Aitchison

=== Biography ===
- "Alfred the Great", illustrated by Norman Williams
- "The Baden-Powell Story", written by Geoffrey Bond (as Alan Jason) and illustrated by Norman Williams, 1954
- "The Golden Man" (Sir Walter Raleigh), written by Marcus Morris and Guy Daniel and illustrated by Robert Ayton, 1961
- "The Great Sailor" (Lord Nelson), illustrated by Norman Williams and Robert Ayton, 1957
- "The Happy Warrior" (Winston Churchill), written by Clifford Makins and illustrated by Frank Bellamy
- "Lincoln of America", written by Geoffrey Bond (as Alan Jason) and illustrated by Norman Williams, 1955
- "Montgomery of Alamein", written by Clifford Makins and illustrated by Frank Bellamy
- "The Travels of Marco Polo", written by Chad Varah and illustrated by Frank Bellamy
- "The True Story of St. Vincent de Paul", written by R. B. Saxe and illustrated by Norman Williams

=== Bible stories ===
- "The Great Adventurer" (St. Paul), written by Chad Varah and illustrated by Frank Hampson and Norman Williams
- "Mark, The Youngest Disciple" written by Chad Varah and illustrated by Giorgio Bellavitis
- "The Road of Courage" (the life of Christ), written by Marcus Morris and Guy Daniel and illustrated by Frank Hampson and Joan Porter
- "The Shepherd King" (King David), written by Clifford Makins and illustrated by Frank Bellamy

=== Reprints ===
- The Adventures of Tintin from the Belgian Hergé (only ran King Ottokar's Sceptre, 1951–1952). Reprint but first appearance of Tintin in English.
