= William Murray (educationist) =

William Murray (19 April 1912 – 21 September 1995) was a British educationist who created the Ladybird Peter and Jane books.

== Early life ==
He was born in County Londonderry.

== Career ==
He worked as a teacher. He became a headmaster at two schools in Cheltenham and a County Education Advisor for Devon. He lectured throughout Britain on the teaching of reading.

=== Learning to read ===
He published a booklet called Key Words to Literacy with the education psychologist Joe McNally from the University of Manchester. The booklet described that they had found that in the English language that children spoke, twelve words accounted for one quarter of all words, one hundred accounted for half, and three hundred accounted for three-quarters.

=== Ladybird ===
The Key Words Reading Scheme, taking his ideas, was first published in 1964, with Peter and Jane, and went on to sell over 80 million copies of the books in the series.

Peter and Jane were based on the real-life children (Jill Ashurst and Christopher Edwards) of a neighbour of the books' illustrator Harry Wingfield. Martin Aitchison and John Berry also illustrated the books.

He retired from teaching in 1970.

== Personal life ==
He married Edith and they had a son, who went on to be a teacher and headmaster, and daughter. He died in Cheltenham at the age of 83. He lived on Leckhampton Road in Cheltenham.
