= Greta Tomlinson =

English artist (1927–2021)

Greta Tomlinson (1927–2021) was an English artist who worked in watercolours, oils and mixed media. At the outset of her career she produced figurative artwork for the Dan Dare cartoon strip in the Eagle comic.

== Birth and education ==
The daughter of a dispensing chemist, Greta Tomlinson was born at Burnley and attended the School of Art there before entering the Slade School of Fine Art in 1944 at the age of 17. She studied under Randolph Schwabe at Oxford, where the Slade was based during wartime evacuation, and afterwards in London, graduating with a Diploma of Fine Art in 1949.

== The Eagle years, 1950–53 ==
In 1950 she joined the team of figure artists, under Frank Hampson, producing illustrations for the Dan Dare adventure stories that were the cover feature of the Eagle weekly comic, first published in July that year. She worked closely with Hampson's principal assistant, Harold Johns, translating Hampson's pencil sketches into colour blocked line-drawings for stories that appeared in the first five volumes of the Eagle. When Hampson fell ill, she and Johns produced the artwork for the third series of Dare's adventures, Marooned on Mercury (scripted by Chad Varah), and the pair were also responsible for illustrating several Dare strips in the first three Eagle Annuals.

In the early days of their operation, the team in Hampson's studio worked under considerable time pressure, and Tomlinson later recalled that she was “regularly drawing at three and four o'clock in the morning”. In order to capture the realism of figure posture, facial expression and clothing folds, Hampson liked to draw from life or from photographs taken in the studio, and Tomlinson became the physical model for the character Professor Jocelyn Peabody, “a first class geologist, botanist, agriculturalist and a qualified space pilot”. Peabody was a prominent figure in the Dare stories and an influential one in a broader sphere, the character's capabilities and courage helping to challenge the stereotypical images of women more familiar to the Eagle’s impressionable young audience in the 1950s.

In 1953 Johns and Tomlinson accepted a personal commission from another studio and, although this had been authorised by Marcus Morris, the Eagle’s editor, Hampson was displeased and dismissed them both. Tomlinson bore him no ill will and appeared prominently in a 1990 ITV documentary, Future Perfect, celebrating his work.

== Later career and work ==
In the later 1950s Tomlinson worked as a fashion artist and as a storyboard creator in the advertising industry before marrying Richard Edwards, an oil company executive. She and her husband lived in the Middle East and Africa before returning to England in 1969. She painted throughout their time abroad and continued to do so until an advanced age, latterly advertising her work on the internet and selling it in both original form and as studio prints.

She worked in oil, watercolour and acrylic paint and with inks and pastels, finding inspiration in a broad range of subject matter and adopting a variety of styles - principally impressionist and semi-abstract - and different techniques, including collage. She exhibited widely, and with some regularity at the Royal Institute of Painters in Watercolours’ exhibitions at the Mall Galleries. Examples of her work are held in the Atkinson Art Gallery Collection at Southport, the town where the first Eagle artwork was produced.

Greta Tomlinson, Mrs Edwards, died on 4 September 2021, aged 94.
