= Varah =

Varah is an English surname. Notable people with this surname include:

- Chad Varah (1911–2007), British Anglican priest
- John Varah Long (1826–1869)
- Michael Varah (1944–2007), British middle-distance runner and probation officer

== See also ==
- Varah Mihir or Varāhamihira, Hindu astronomer
