= Dan Dare =

British science fiction comic hero

- The return of the 'original' Dan Dare in 1989.

Publication information
- Publisher: Hulton Press
- First appearance: Eagle #1 (14 April 1950)
- Created by: Frank Hampson

In-story information
- Full name: Daniel McGregor Dare
- Team affiliations: Interplanet Space Fleet (Colonel)

Dan Dare is a British science fiction comic hero, created by illustrator Frank Hampson who also wrote the first stories. Dare appeared in the Eagle comic series Dan Dare, Pilot of the Future from 1950 to 1967 (and subsequently in reprints), and dramatised seven times a week on Radio Luxembourg (1951–1956).

The stories were set in the late 1990s, but the dialogue and manner of the characters is reminiscent of British war films of the 1950s. Dan Dare has been described as "Biggles in Space" and as the British equivalent of Buck Rogers. Dan Dare was distinguished by its long, complex storylines, snappy dialogue and meticulously illustrated comic-strip artwork by Hampson and other artists, including Harold Johns, Don Harley, Bruce Cornwell, Greta Tomlinson, Frank Bellamy, and Keith Watson.

Dan Dare returned in new strips in 2000 AD in 1977 until 1979 and in the relaunched Eagle in 1982 until 1994. The most recent mainstream story was a Dan Dare mini-series published by Titan Comics in 2017. It was written by Peter Milligan and is a completely new interpretation of Dan Dare, who is struggling to adapt to a peaceful life after the Mekon has been defeated. Since October 2003, Dare's adventures have also continued in Spaceship Away, a mail-order magazine created by Rod Barzilay. A new graphic novel, First Contact, by Alex de Campi and Marc Laming, is scheduled to be published in November 2026.

== Publication history ==
=== Eagle ===
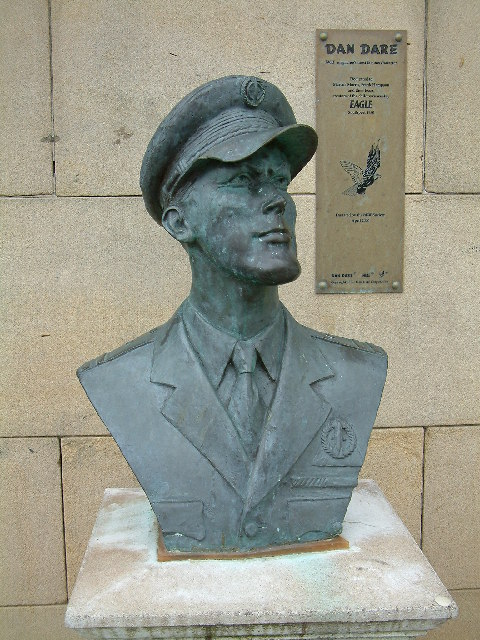
Bust of Dan Dare in Southport

Dan Dare appeared on the cover of the first issue of the weekly comic strip magazine, Eagle, on 14 April 1950. There were two large colour pages of his story per issue. The artwork was of a high quality, the product of artists in a studio called the Old Bakehouse in Churchtown, Southport, Lancashire. The Eagle's founder, the Rev John Marcus Harston Morris, was vicar of the Southport church of St James at the time. It had scale models of spaceships, and models in costume as reference for the artists. Occasionally, Eagle incorporated "centrefolds" of the fictional spaceships, such as Dan's ship the Anastasia, reminiscent of cutaway drawings of aircraft in aviation magazines or even in Eagle itself. The storylines were long and complex, sometimes lasting more than a year. Later, artwork was produced at a studio in Hampson's house in Epsom, Surrey, where his production line techniques were continued.

Attention was paid to scientific plausibility with a young Arthur C. Clarke acting as science and plot adviser for the first six months of strips. The stories were set mostly on planets of the Solar System presumed to have extraterrestrial life and alien inhabitants, common in science fiction before space probes of the 1960s proved the most likely worlds were lifeless. The first story begins with Dan Dare as pilot of the first successful flight to Venus.

Hampson's working habits twice caused him to suffer serious breakdowns in health, leaving his assistants to continue the series. The first occurred after two episodes of "Marooned on Mercury" (1952), which was taken over by Harold Johns, from scripts by Samaritans founder and clergyman Rev. Chad Varah, who had known Marcus Morris in Southport. Hampson returned to start the following story, "Operation Saturn" (1953), but suffered a relapse after 20 weeks. Principal art was taken over by new chief assistant Don Harley, who completed the story and its successor, "Prisoners of Space" (the only series to feature extensive work by an artist outside the studio, finishes being provided by Desmond Walduck).

Hampson returned full-time in 1955, starting "The Man from Nowhere" trilogy, which took Dan and his companions outside the Solar System for the first time.

The quality of the strip and its popularity remained high throughout the 1950s. In the late fifties Eagle's new owners objected to the cost of the studio and the complexity of the stories. The conflict caused Hampson to leave the strip in 1959, in the middle of a long plot that saw Dan searching an alien planet for his long-lost father. Production fell to Frank Bellamy, whose modern three-dimensional style contrasted with Hampson's, despite efforts to smooth the transition by alternating the two pages of the weekly strip between Bellamy and the team of Don Harley and Keith Watson, and freelance artist Bruce Cornwell, who had been part of Hampson's studio at the beginning.

==== Characters ====
Dan Dare was surrounded by a varying cast, initially:

- Colonel Dan Dare (full name Daniel McGregor Dare) is chief pilot of the Interplanet Space Fleet. He was born in Manchester, England, in 1967 and educated at Rossall School. Although not a super-hero, he sometimes pulled off exceptional piloting and often proved extraordinarily lucky. He excelled at jujutsu, but he most often found non-violent solutions to predicaments. He was bound by a sense of honour, never lied, and would rather die than break his word.

His lean-faced character was recognisable by the outer tips of his eyebrows, which were wavy. His uniform looked like a typical British Army type (Frank Hampson used his own World War II army uniform as a model), though a lighter green. In place of British rank insignia it had coloured stripes and circles on the shoulderboards. His cap badge was a vertical, antique rocketship in a circle with one five-pointed star on either side. Initially, Dare had been intended to be portrayed as a chaplain.

- Digby (Albert Fitzwilliam Digby) is Dan's Wigan-born batman. Rotund and sometimes bumbling, he provided comic relief. He was fiercely loyal and the only character apart from Dan to appear in every story. His favourite recreation was sleeping and he was fond of traditional English food. His nearest relative was his Aunt Anastasia, after whom Dan named his spaceship.
- Sir Hubert Guest, Controller of the Space Fleet, sends Dan on missions, and has occasionally joined him. He was a veteran pilot, having been on the first mission to the Moon and led the first mission to Mars. He was based on Hampson's father.
- Professor Peabody (Prof. Jocelyn Mabel Peabody), the only major female, is the brains behind many of the team's most inventive plans.
- Hank Hogan and Pierre Lafayette, stereotypically American and French, were two of the Fleet's best pilots and an inseparable double-act. Pierre was primarily a pilot, Hank more a mechanic.
- Sondar is a Treen, a reptilian inhabitant of northern Venus. Originally a servant of the Mekon, he reformed after Dan spared his life during a traumatic episode that also caused his first experience of strong emotion, which the Treens suppressed. He became governor of northern Venus when the planet was placed under UN rule at the end of the first story, but nevertheless joined Dan on later adventures. He was also a talented spacecraft designer, and designed Dan's personal spaceship.
- The Mekon, super-intelligent ruler of the Treens, is Dan's archenemy. He escaped at the end of each story to return with an even more inventive scheme for the conquest of Earth.
- Christopher 'Flamer' Spry, freckle-faced student at 'Astral' space academy, who accompanies Dan Dare on many later missions. Flamer was based on Hampson's son, Peter Hampson. No forename for 'Flamer' was ever given in the comic strip itself.
- Lex O'Malley, bearded Irish submarine commander, who accompanies Dan Dare on later missions.

With the exception of Digby, all the supporting cast were dropped after 1961, although Guest, O'Malley, Hogan and Sondar made occasional reappearances. In 1963, Keith Watson and writer David Motton were allowed to introduce a new supporting cast, who remained with the series throughout the rest of its run:

- Colonel Wilf Banger, handlebar moustache, pilot and designer, an impulsive and volatile character. Banger designed and built the Tempus Frangit.
- Technician Nutter Cobb, red-haired, broken-nosed. Banger's assistant, a Digby to his Dare.
- Major Shillitoe Spence, balding, pencil moustache. A prim, fussy administrator.
- Xel, first encountered in Operation Time Trap in 1963. Xel is another enemy in the mould of the Mekon. Having stowed away with Dare at the end of his first appearance, in the next story Xel allies with the Mekon but the two fall out. Xel would make regular appearances through the 60s before being finally captured.

==== Vehicles ====
Spacecraft of various designs were presented as the product of inhabitants of various planets. The vehicle most identified with Dan was the winged Anastasia. Designed by Sondar, it employed both Venusian and Earth space drives. In 1960, an alien ship was adopted and renamed the Zylbat. There was also an experimental time-travelling ship called Tempus Frangit (Latin: it breaks time or time breaks).

There were land and air vehicles – in the first stories, cars conform to styling of the time, while some flying machines were based on the design of helicopters of the mid-twentieth century. Also of note was Lex O'Malley's ship, the Poseidon, a versatile craft that could operate as a jetfoil as well as a submarine.

London Transport used overhead monorails and helibuses in early stories. Ground transport cars were also drawn with gyroscopes and single wheels.

Venusian vehicles were depicted as being technologically more advanced than those of Earth. South of the Flamebelt the Therons had applied their technology to peaceful agricultural purposes including dedicated agricultural land and flying machines. North of the Flamebelt the Treens perfected low friction/low energy consumption means of transport including vacuum tube transport (Electrosenders) for long distance travel.

==== Spaceports ====
There is evidence that the Spacefleet spaceport on Earth is west of Formby in Lancashire on a semicircle of land built into the Irish Sea by land reclamation.

==== Spacesuits ====
Spacefleet spacesuits had a corselet plate like on Siebe Gorman standard diving suits. Their suit had no life-support backpack; the life-support gear was between two layers of the helmet.

All or most Dan Dare comic pictures were drawn from models or posed humans. As a result, the Spacefleet spacesuits in space hang in folds like the boilersuit in which the models posed and show no sign of gas pressure. After the first Venus war, Spacefleet spacesuits had propulsor backpacks copied from a Treen or Theron design.

Some other spacesuits such as Blasco's have life-support backpacks.

==== 1960s ====
In 1960 artwork was taken over by Frank Bellamy, Don Harley, Keith Watson, Gerald Palmer, with Bruce Cornwell, and the look changed, with the colourful, rounded rocket ships replaced by angular silver craft, and changes to the space suits and insignia. The changes were never wholeheartedly taken up, however, and the look was erratic from then on. In 1962 the strip was removed from the front to the inside of the comic, in black and white, and was drawn by Keith Watson. Over the remaining years the strip varied in format and quality, even returning to the front page in colour between 1963 and 1965, until it ended in 1967 with Dan retiring to become Space Fleet controller. Strips from the 1950s were reprinted until 1969, when Eagle merged with Lion. For a while the reprints continued in black and white in Lion.

=== 2000 AD ===
In 1977, Dan Dare appeared again in the first issue of 2000 AD (26 February 1977). The first installment, scripted by Ken Armstrong and Pat Mills, had the character revived from suspended animation after two hundred years to find himself in a different world. The Mekon had also survived but otherwise the cast was different, as was the tone of the strip (heavily influenced by the punk movement, as was much of 2000 AD) and the personality of the title character. Written by Kelvin Gosnell and then Steve Moore, the strip was initially illustrated by Massimo Belardinelli, whose Dare owed nothing to the original apart from the wavy eyebrows. After 23 issues in this format the strip took a break for a month and then returned in a revamped format with a more realistic style, written by Gerry Finley-Day and Jack Adrian (Chris Lowder) and illustrated by Dave Gibbons. Dare was now launched on a deep space mission, much in the style of Star Trek but with technology designs very much influenced by Star Wars. In a series of episodic adventures, Dare encountered various threats, including an extended multi-episode adventure uniting slave races in opposition to the "Star Slayers" – the oppressive race controlling that region. The overall mission had a surprisingly downbeat ending, leaving a space-suited Dare the only survivor, adrift in space on wreckage.

The strip was rested for 14 issues, returning early in 1979 in 2000 AD's 100th issue. The amnesiac Dare is rescued from space by the Mekon and indoctrinated into the Mekon's army before eventually recovering his memory. Now penned by Tom Tully but still drawn by Dave Gibbons, this re-imagining of Dare casts him almost as a superhero with a colourful tight-fitting uniform provided by the Mekon. Dare escapes to a planet that is home to an amphibian-like race, which claims he is their Chosen One. There he receives a semi-mystical glove that can shoot energy beams but is unable to prevent the Mekon from acquiring the mystical Crystal of Life. On his return to Earth, he and his Treen companion Sondar find themselves branded traitors and found guilty of helping the Mekon to steal the Crystal. This story arc concluded with the pair escaping the Earth authorities and going on the run to try to clear their names by tracking down the Mekon and recovering the Crystal, establishing the format for the next story arc. Despite promises that Dare and Sondar would be back, the 2000 AD Dan Dare strip "Attack on Eternium" ended here in prog 126 (18 August 1979).

In 1997, to celebrate their 20th anniversary, 2000 AD published two issues with additional free comics, the first a reprint of the first issue of 2000 AD, which starred Dan Dare. The second free comic was a speculative issue called 3000 AD which contained strips partially based on the first issue of 2000 AD. One strip was entitled "The Return of Dan Dare", which also featured the return of the Mekon.

=== New Eagle ===
In 1982 Eagle was re-launched, with Dan Dare again its flagship strip. The new character was the great-great-great-grandson of the original hero—the only surviving character from the original strip being the Mekon. The initial artist was Gerry Embleton, who drew Dan to resemble the original exactly, but he was quickly replaced by Ian Kennedy, who gave the hero a younger look and blond hair.

The opening Dan Dare story was an epic, lasting 18 months, written by Pat Mills and John Wagner. It opened with a flashback to the unseen final defeat of the Mekon by the original Dan, after which he was sealed inside an artificial asteroid and exiled into space. Centuries later he was accidentally freed and returned to conquer Earth. A few years later the descendant of his sworn enemy returned from space to find Earth under Treen rule and set out to free the planet. His new cast included Lt Helen Scott, leader of the Earth Resistance, and Valdon, a renegade Treen similar to the earlier Sondar. One controversial aspect of the strip was a lengthy flashback which retconned the original Dan to be a veteran of the Second World War and to have travelled through time to the era in which his adventures in the original Eagle took place—an attempt to explain why a hero in the age of space travel had a 1950s outlook on life.

After this initial storyline other writers were used and different supporting characters came and went, including Professor Pinkerton, a female scientist similar to Professor Peabody, and a new Digby (again, a descendant of the original). The Mekon was generally the foe in alternate stories.

In 1987 the strip became more like a space opera, with increasing violence. Now drawn by John Gillatt, Dan took on a tough-guy look. He led space commandos and packed a hi-tech gun reminiscent of that carried by Judge Dredd.

The original strip, featuring the original characters of the 1950s Eagle, was revived in 1989, with artist Keith Watson providing the artwork for the initial run of stories. Watson had been part of the Dan Dare team from 1958 to 1960 and was the main artist on Dan Dare from 1962 to 1967. The artwork for the final stories was provided by David Pugh. The new Eagle ended in 1994.

=== Revolver ===
In 1990, a strip entitled Dare, written by Grant Morrison and drawn by Rian Hughes, was serialised in Revolver. It presented bleak and cynical characters and was a not-too-subtle satire of 1980s British politics, from the perspective of the defeated left wing of the Labour Party. Spacefleet had been privatised, the Treens were subjected to racist abuse in urban ghettos, Digby was unemployed, Professor Peabody committed suicide, and Dare's mentor Sir Hubert Guest betrayed Dare to the Mekon and his quisling British Prime Minister, Gloria Monday (whose appearance and demeanour appear modelled on Margaret Thatcher). Ultimately, Dare destroys London, the Mekon and himself through a smuggled nuclear weapon. The last episode appeared in Crisis, following Revolver's cancellation. This version was not popular.

=== The Planet ===
In 1996, The Planet published its first and only issue. Inside was a new and unfinished Dan Dare story, "Remembrance", drawn by Sydney Jordan featuring a slightly older Dare and apparently set some years after the original Eagle strips.

=== Spaceship Away ===
Launched in October 2003, Spaceship Away magazine was originally created in order to get "The Phoenix Mission" (a 1950s style story by Rod Barzilay with art by Keith Watson and Don Harley) into publication, with the agreement of the Dan Dare Corporation. Response was good enough to warrant the magazine's continuation following that strip's conclusion, initially with "Green Nemesis" (again by Barzilay and Don Harley, with later chapters drawn by David Pugh and Tim Booth). Other stories have since followed.

Its mission statement is to continue the original Dare's adventures where the original Eagle left off, in a style as close to that of the classic strip as possible. To that end, Barzilay originally hired former Eagle artist Keith Watson, and following Watson's death Don Harley, both of whom had drawn Dare in the 1960s, to work on the strips which are written very much in the style of the Fifties stories.

Despite a fairly small circulation (it is available only via mail order, through its own website, or in a select few comic shops), Spaceship Away continues to appear three times a year as of 2022.

=== Virgin Comics ===
In 2007–2008 Virgin Comics published a 7-issue Dan Dare mini-series written by Garth Ennis, with art by Gary Erskine. Virgin's founder and chairman Richard Branson is a fan of the character. The series is set several years after the original strips. Space Fleet has collapsed along with the UN due to nuclear war between China and America; Britain survived due to defensive shields made by Professor Peabody, and has become a world power again as a result, with the Royal Navy taking Space Fleet's role. Peabody is the Home Secretary to a prime minister modelled on Tony Blair, who has sold Earth's defence out to The Mekon out of fear of overwhelming odds. Dare, assisted by Digby, leads a spirited defence of both Earth and his honourable principles.

=== Titan Comics ===
In 2017–18 a four-issue mini-series by Peter Milligan and Alberto Foche was published by Titan Comics.

=== First Contact ===
In 2026 writer Alex de Campi and artist Marc Laming announced their new 100-page graphic novel, Dan Dare: First Contact, would be published in November 2026 by B7 Comics.

== In other media ==
=== Radio ===
==== Radio Luxembourg serial ====
This ad for The New Adventures of Dan Dare, Pilot of the Future serial appeared in the 208 magazine in March 1952.

The New Adventures of Dan Dare, Pilot of the Future aired five times a week on Radio Luxembourg for five years from 2 July 1951. Dan's voice was Noel Johnson, who also played Dick Barton on BBC radio. Each episode started with the command "Spaceships Away!". The 15-minute show was sponsored by Horlicks and on 3 March 1952, the 106th episode of Dan Dare was heard that Monday night with different episodes on Tuesday, Wednesday, Thursday and Friday at 7:15pm. Although the dramatisation was recorded on wax discs for broadcast, the original discs were lost or destroyed. Until recently no copies had ever been recovered but in late 2011 two episodes were found as part of the Lost Shows Appeal, orchestrated by missing episode hunter Charles Norton. The recovered shows were "Under Sentence of Death" (episode 76), aired on 21 January 1952, and "The Lost World On Mars" (episode 53), aired on 19 March 1953.

==== Radio Madrid serial ====
"Diego Valor" Spanish adaptation of Dan Dare from 1954

==== BBC adaptation ====
From 19 April – 10 May 1990, BBC Radio 4 aired a four-part adaptation of Voyage to Venus, dramatised by Nick McCarty and directed by Glyn Dearman. The cast included Mick Ford (Col. Dan Dare), Donald Gee (Digby), Richard Pearce (the Mekon), Terence Alexander (Sir Hubert Guest), Zelah Clarke (Prof. Peabody), William Roberts (Hank Hogan), Sean Barrett (Pierre Lafayette), John Moffatt (Kalon), Shirley Dixon (Mrs. Digby), Ben Onwukwe (Volstar), David Goudge (Sondar), Margaret Courtenay (Aunt Anastasia), Brian Miller (Urtag), David King (Dapon).

==== B7 Media adaptation ====
In September 2015, B7 Media secured the rights to produce a new Dan Dare audio drama series from the Dan Dare Corporation. The lead writers were Richard Kurti and Bev Doyle, with Andrew Mark Sewell as director and Simon Moorhead as producer; John Freeman served as creative consultant. The first volume, released in 2016, starred Ed Stoppard as Dan Dare, Geoff McGivern as Digby, Heida Reed as Professor Peabody, Michael Cochrane as Sir Hubert, Raad Rawi as the Mekon and Bijan Daneshmand as Sondar; Volume 2 was released in 2017. Both volumes were produced in association with Big Finish Productions. BBC Radio 4 Extra began airing the B7 episodes in August 2018.

=== Television ===
In the 1980s, a series of live-action adverts for Mobil motor oil featured Dan and Digby in comedic situations, trying to get their rockets to go faster. The dialogue was straight from wartime upper class RAF officers' slang.

In 2002, Dan Dare: Pilot of the Future became a computer-generated TV series produced first by Netter Digital then by Foundation Imaging, running to twenty-six 22-minute episodes. The series drew on several comic book incarnations. It started on Nicktoons UK on 5 November 2005 at 6.30 pm.

Two abortive attempts had been made to make a live-action series, in 1981 and 1991. James Fox and Robert Bathurst were reportedly lined up to play Dare respectively. In 1991, a short pilot starring Bathurst as Dare and Geoffrey Hughes as Digby was made. Parts of it were broadcast in an ITV documentary, Future Perfect.

=== Film ===
In 2010, Variety announced that Warner Bros. was planning to produce a Dan Dare movie starring Sam Worthington in the title role.

=== Computer games ===
During the 1980s, Dan Dare starred in three computer games for the Commodore 64/128, ZX Spectrum, Amstrad CPC and Atari computers. The first was a different game on each system; the second and third were shoot'em-ups. All three were based on the 1950s strip rather than the contemporary comics:

- Dan Dare: Pilot of the Future (1986, Electronic Arts, re-released by Ricochet)
- Dan Dare II: The Mekon's Revenge (1988, Virgin Games, re-released by Ricochet)
- Dan Dare III: The Escape (1990, Virgin Games)

=== Console video games ===
The protagonist human character from the Gaiares science fiction space shooter starfighter combat game released in Japan in 1990 was changed from an original character called Dan Diaz to the legendary sci-fi hero Dan Dare in the English translated western version.

=== Music ===
Pink Floyd founder Syd Barrett wrote Dan Dare into his song "Astronomy Domine", from the band's debut album The Piper at the Gates of Dawn (1967), with the line "Stairway scare, Dan Dare, who's there?".

Elton John recorded "Dan Dare (Pilot Of The Future)" for his 1975 album Rock of the Westies.

David Bowie's song "D.J." (1979) contains the somewhat obscure lyric: "I feel like Dan Dare lies down".

British punk rock group The Mekons included their song "Dan Dare" on their 1979 album The Quality of Mercy Is Not Strnen, and recorded it again for their 2004 album Punk Rock.

The 1983 album The Principle of Moments by Robert Plant contains the song "Messin' with the Mekon."

The relaunch of Eagle comics in 1982 saw a free single giveaway of a track called Dan Dare by the group Loose Talk.

The album Below the Waste (1989) by the Art of Noise opened with the song "Dan Dare".

British electronic dance group Fluke mentioned Dan Dare in their song "Absurd" (1997), "Dan Dare's sitting there, scared by the killer teddy bears".

Les Barker's album Dogologues includes a monologue "Dan Dare".

== Characters inspired by Dan Dare ==
Characters inspired by or based on Dan Dare have appeared throughout British popular culture. One example is Wing Commander Leyton in British Summertime by Paul Cornell, which juxtaposes the utopian future portrayed in the original comics with the Britain of today.

In the 1980s, Private Eye published Dan Dire, Pilot of The Future?. Dire was based on politician Neil Kinnock, the question being whether he'd ever become prime minister. Dire's enemy was the Maggon, a combination of the Mekon and Margaret Thatcher.

Radio DJ and Comedian Kenny Everett's character Captain Kremmen was inspired by Dan Dare.

A porcine pastiche, Ham Dare: Pig of the Future, written by Lew Stringer and with art by Malcolm Douglas, appeared in Oink! comic.

Marvel Comics created a Dan Dare-esque character in their Captain Britain line in the 1980s. The character was Roy Risk, one of the British heroes killed by The Fury.

In Jonathan Hickman's Avengers series, the character Smasher's secret identity is astronomer Isabel 'Izzy' Dare whose dying elderly grandfather alludes to Izzy as inheriting a destiny from him. He hand her a business card that expresses a deep friendship with Captain America. The card reveals the grandfather's name as Dan. In the trade hardcover for Avengers, Izzy's last name is changed to Kane, meaning her grandfather is Marvel's Captain Terror.

In 1987, one issue of DC Comics' Action Comics depicted the Green Lantern Corps using an energy construct spacecraft whose external shape was exactly like the Zylbat.

In his Afterword to Ministry of Space, Warren Ellis lists Dan Dare as one of the inspirations for the story, in which Britain forges an ambitious space programme in the decades following World War II. Sir John Dashwood, the central character of Ministry of Space, is a cynical version of Dan Dare himself.

Captain Jack Harkness, the Doctor Who and Torchwood character, has several similarities to Dan Dare. The script for the episode "The Empty Child" in which Captain Jack makes his first appearance describes him as having "the jawline of Dan Dare, the smile of a bastard".

== Collected editions ==
Most of the 1950s and 1960s strips were reprinted by Hawk Books between 1987 and 1995:

1. Pilot of the Future
2. The Red Moon Mystery and Marooned on Mercury
3. Operation Saturn
4. Prisoners of Space
5. The Man from Nowhere
6. Rogue Planet
7. Reign of the Robots and The Ship That Lived
8. The Phantom Fleet
9. Terra Nova trilogy
10. Project Nimbus
11. Solid Space Mystery
12. The Final Volume

Stories left out were :

- Operation Earthsavers (v13, 10–23)
- The Evil One (v13, 24–32)
- Operation Fireball (v13, 33–42)
- The Web of Fear (v13, 43–52)
- Operation Dark Star (v14, 1–9)
- Operation Time Trap (v14, 10–38)
- The Wandering World (v14, 39 – v15, 13)
- The Big City Caper (v15, 14–22)
- The Singing Scourge (v16, 30 – v17, 6)
- Give Me The Moon (v17, 7–26)

In 2004, Titan Books began collecting the series from the beginning of the Hampson run in dust-jacketed hardback editions. Collected thus far:

- Voyage to Venus Part 1 (96 pages, April 2004, ISBN 1-84023-644-2)
- Voyage to Venus Part 2 (96 pages, September 2004, ISBN 1-84023-841-0)
- The Red Moon Mystery (96 pages, October 2004, ISBN 1-84023-666-3)
- Marooned on Mercury (96 pages, January 2005, ISBN 1-84023-847-X)
- Operation Saturn Part 1 (96 pages, April 2005, ISBN 1-84023-809-7)
- Operation Saturn Part 2 (96 pages, July 2005, ISBN 1-84576-088-3)
- Prisoners of Space (112 pages, November 2005, ISBN 1-84576-151-0)
- The Man From Nowhere (96 pages, April 2007, ISBN 1-84576-412-9)
- Rogue Planet (144 pages, August 2007, ISBN 1-84576-413-7)
- Reign of the Robots (112 pages, April 2008, ISBN 1-84576-414-5)
- Phantom Fleet (104 pages, March 2009, ISBN 1-84856-127-X)
- Safari in Space (96 pages, January 2010, ISBN 1-84856-372-8)
- Trip to Trouble (96 pages, November 2010, ISBN 1-84856-366-3)
- Mission of the Earthmen (November 2017), includes The Solid Space Mystery
- The Earth Stealers(May 2018), includes "The Platinum Planet"
- The Evil One (24 September 2019). (New artists, black & white).

The Morrison/Hughes Revolver series has been collected by Fleetway in 1991 as Dare: The Controversial Memoir of Dan Dare (ISBN 1853862118).

The 2007 series had the first three issues collected into one hardback volume, released in April 2008 (ISBN 0981520022), but the whole series was collected into a single volume by Virgin Comics later in the year, with Dynamite Entertainment also making hardcovers and softcovers available early in 2009:

- Dan Dare (208 pages, hardcover, Virgin Comics, September 2008, ISBN 0-9814808-3-7, Dynamite Entertainment, February 2009, ISBN 1-60690-027-7, March 2009, ISBN 1-60690-054-4, softcover, September 2009, ISBN 1-60690-055-2)

A collection of stories from 2000 AD was published in November 2015.

- Dan Dare: The 2000 AD Years, vol. 1 (320 pages, hardcover, Rebellion Developments, November 2015, ISBN 1-78108-349-5)
- Dan Dare The 2000 AD Years, vol. 2 (320 pages, hardcover, Rebellion Developments, November 2016, ISBN 9781781084601)

== See also ==
- List of Dan Dare stories
- Radio Luxembourg - Dan Dare was a feature heard several times a week on 208 during the 1950s.
- Dan Dare: Pilot of the Future (TV series)
