= Richard E. Jennings =

British comic book artist

- Jennings c. 1974
- Born: 20 May 1921 Hampstead, England
- Died: 19 January 1997 (aged 75) Cornwall, England
- Areas: Artist, penciler, inker, writer
- Notable works: Tommy Walls, Storm Nelson, The Daleks

Richard E. Jennings (20 May 1921 – 19 January 1997) was a comic book artist who lived and worked in the United Kingdom.

== Biography ==
Richard E. Jennings was born in Hampstead, England. In 1937 he won a free place to the Central School of Arts, London. After two years his studies were interrupted by the outbreak of the Second World War, during which he served in the Air/Sea Rescue service of the Royal Air Force in the Middle East. Following demobilisation he travelled around England before taking work as a fisherman, and decorating public houses and hotels in the Devon area for a brewery company.

Moving to London in 1950, he secured a position with the newly launched Eagle comic. His first work was on the Tommy Walls strip (advertising Wall's ice cream). He worked on this for the next three years, eventually writing the scripts as well as providing the artwork.

In October 1953 Jennings commenced work as the artist on the new Eagle Storm Nelson maritime adventure strip, in collaboration with film screenwriter Guy Morgan. After Morgan left he continued both drawing and writing the strip until its cancellation in March 1962. Further work for the Eagle followed during that year, with his last strip for the comic being 'Island of Fire' which ran from July to October 1962.

Jennings's work was not confined to the Eagle. Other commissions included strips for the Junior Mirror, Swift and early episodes of The Daleks comic strip for TV Century 21. He also provided artwork for several annuals.

By the late 1960s Jennings had ceased working as a comic strip artist. At one point he was employed as a long-distance lorry driver, supplementing his income by travelling around the Yorkshire Dales during his spare time painting pub signs and portraits.

In later years Jennings retired to Cornwall. He died of pneumonia on 19 January 1997, aged 75.

== Bibliography ==
Comic works include -

- Tommy Walls (in Eagle, 1950–1953)
- Storm Nelson (with Guy Morgan in Eagle, 1953–1962)
- The Fighting Tomahawks (in Junior Mirror, 1954)
- The Further Adventures of Robinson Crusoe (in Swift, 1957–58)
- Adventures of the Bovril Brigade (advertising strip, in various publications, 1961)
- The Lost World (script, with Martin Aitchison in Eagle, 1962)
- Island of Fire (in Eagle, 1962)
- Seeing Stars (in Eagle, 1962)
- Tornado Jones (in Wham!, 1964–68)
  - Genesis of Evil (with Alan Fennell, David Whitaker in TV Century 21 #1–3, 1965)
  - Power Play (with Alan Fennell, David Whitaker in TV Century 21 #4–10, 1965)
  - Duel of the Daleks (with Alan Fennell, David Whitaker in TV Century 21 #11–17, 1965)
  - The Amaryll Challenge (with David Whitaker in TV Century 21 #18–24, 1965)
  - The Penta Ray Factor (with David Whitaker in TV Century 21 #25–32, 1965)
  - Plague of Death (with David Whitaker in TV Century 21 #33–39, 1965)
  - The Menace of the Monstrons (with David Whitaker in TV Century 21 #40–46, 1965)
  - Eve of the War (with David Whitaker in TV Century 21 #47-49, 1965)

Annual & graphic novel works include –

- The Dalek Book (Panther Books Ltd. / Souvenir Press Ltd., 1965)
- The Dalek World (Panther Books Ltd. / Souvenir Press Ltd., 1966)
- The Dalek Outer Space Book (Panther Books Ltd. / Souvenir Press Ltd., 1967)
- The Dalek Chronicles (Marvel UK Ltd., 1994. ISSN 1353-7628)

== See also ==
- List of Eagle comic strips
