= Rogue planet (disambiguation) =

A rogue planet is a planet that does not orbit a star.

It can also refer to:

- Rogue Planet (novel), a 2000 novel set in the Star Wars galaxy
- "Rogue Planet" (Star Trek: Enterprise), a 2001 episode of the television series Star Trek: Enterprise
- "Rogue Planet" (Dan Dare), a Dan Dare story that ran in the original Eagle comic from 1955 to 1957
- Rogue Planet Games, a division of video game developer Daybreak Game Company
