= Voyage to Venus =

Voyage to Venus may refer to:

- Voyage to Venus (Doctor Who audio)
- A later title for Perelandra by C. S. Lewis
- One of a list of Dan Dare stories
