= Dan Dare: Pilot of the Future (TV series) =

2002 British animated television series

- Based on: Dan Dare by Frank Hampson
- Developed by: Colin Frewin; Bob Forward; Greg Johnson
- Voices of: Greg Ellis; Chris Cox; Carole Ruggier
- Theme music composer: Bernie Taupin; Elton John
- Ending theme: "Dan Dare: Pilot of the Future" performed by Elton John
- Composer: Frank W. Becker
- Countries of origin: United Kingdom; United States
- Original language: English
- No. of seasons: 1
- No. of episodes: 26

Production
- Executive producers: Colin Frewin; Rick Ungar
- Running time: 22 minutes
- Production companies: The Dan Dare Corporation; Columbia TriStar International Television

Original release
- Network: Channel 5
- Release: 6 July – 28 December 2002

Dan Dare: Pilot of the Future is an animated television series produced by the Dan Dare Corporation and Columbia TriStar International Television (who also provided worldwide distribution), with animation first provided by Netter Digital then by Foundation Imaging, running to twenty-six 22-minute episodes. The series drew on several different incarnations of the Dan Dare comic.

== Cast ==
- Chris Cox as Hank Hogan
- Greg Ellis as Dan Dare
- Julian Holloway as Digby
- Rob Paulsen as The Mekon and Retro Rocket
- Carole Ruggier as Professor Jocelyn Peabody
- Rodger Bumpass as Sondar and Volstar

== Episode list ==
No.	Title	Original release date
1	"Pilot Of The Future (part 1)"	6 July 2002
2	"Pilot Of The Future (part 2)"	13 July 2002
3	"The Ark of Phobos (Part 1)"	20 July 2002
4	"The Ark of Phobos (part 2)"	27 July 2002
5	"God of War (part 1)"	3 August 2002
6	"God of War (part 2)"	10 August 2002
7	"Journey to the Centre of the Sun (part 1)"	17 August 2002
8	"Journey to the Centre of the Sun (part 2)"	24 August 2002
9	"Mines of Titan (part 1)"	31 August 2002
10	"Mines of Titan (part 2)"	7 September 2002
11	"The Outpost (part 1)"	14 September 2002
12	"The Outpost (part 2)"	21 September 2002
13	"Full Circle (part 1)"	28 September 2002
14	"Full Circle (part 2)"	5 October 2002
15	"The Mekon Among Us (part 1)"	12 October 2002
16	"The Mekon Among Us (part 2)"	19 October 2002
17	"Saturn Rocs (part 1)"	26 October 2002
18	"Saturn Rocs (part 2)"	2 November 2002
19	"Menace on Mars (part 1)"	9 November 2002
20	"Menace on Mars (part 2)"	16 November 2002
21	"Space Race (part 1)"	23 November 2002
22	"Space Race (part 2)"	30 November 2002
23	"Dead Space (part 1)"	7 December 2002
24	"Dead Space (part 2)"	14 December 2002
25	"Surrender Earth (part 1)"	21 December 2002
26	"Surrender Earth (part 2)"	28 December 2002
