= Robert Ayton =

Robert Ayton may refer to:

- Robert Aytoun (1570–1638), Scottish poet
- Robert Ayton (illustrator) (1915–1985), illustrator for the Eagle comic and Ladybird Books
