= List of Dan Dare stories =

The list of Dan Dare stories details appearances of the character Dan Dare, created by Frank Hampson.

== The original Eagle stories ==
These are the Dan Dare stories that appeared in the original Eagle magazine, which ran from 1950 to 1969 and featured the hero Dan Dare. The stories would often take place as parts of longer story arcs, and when this happened, the stories were grouped together as such. These storylines were reprinted by Hawk Books in the late 1980s and early 1990s, and as of May, 2009 the first ten stories have been reprinted again by Titan Books. The series of twelve hardbacks, each about 100 pages, splits Voyage to Venus and Operation Saturn across two volumes each. After a brief hiatus, the following two stories, 'Man From Nowhere' and 'Rogue Planet' were released in 2008, with The Phantom Fleet and Safari in Space continuing publication into 2009.

Three stories (Man From Nowhere, Rogue Planet, Reign of the Robots) were reproduced in the early 1980s by Dragon's Dream. The first of these books was particularly notable because the front page panel with the Eagle logo was replaced with new artwork drawn by Dan Dare's creator Frank Hampson.

Hampson used a studio system with several artists working together on each episode. These included Bruce Cornwell, Don Harley and Keith Watson.

| Story Title | Source | Date | Notes |
|---|---|---|---|
| Dan Dare: The First Story variously referred to as: Pilot of the Future The Venus Story Voyage to Venus | Volume 1, Number 1 Volume 2, Number 25 | 14 April 1950; 28 September 1951 | Drawn and written by Frank Hampson. |
| The Red Moon Mystery | Volume 2, Number 26; Volume 3, Number 11 | 5 October 1951; 20 June 1952 | |
| Marooned on Mercury | Volume 3, Number 12; Volume 3, Number 46 | 27 June 1952; 20 February 1953 | Drawn by Frank Hampson and Harold Johns. |
| Operation Saturn | Volume 3, Number 47; Volume 5, Number 21 | 27 February 1953; 21 May 1954 | |
| Prisoners of Space | Volume 5, Number 22; Volume 6, Number 18 | 28 May 1954; 6 May 1955 | Drawn by Desmond Walduck. |
| The Man from Nowhere | Volume 6, Number 19; Volume 6, Number 47 | 13 May 1955; 25 November 1955 | |
| Rogue Planet | Volume 6, Number 48; Volume 8, Number 7 | 2 December 1955; 15 February 1957 | Drawn by Frank Hampson and Don Harley. |
| Reign of the Robots | Volume 8, Number 8 Volume 9, Number 4 | 22 February 1957; 24 January 1958 | Drawn by Frank Hampson and Don Harley. |
| The Ship that Lived | Volume 9, Number 5 Volume 9, Number 16 | 31 January 1958; 18 April 1958 | |
| The Phantom Fleet | Volume 9, Number 17; Volume 9, Number 52 | 25 April 1958; 27 December 1958 | |
| Safari in Space | Volume 10, Number 1 Volume 10, Number 18 | 3 January 1959; 2 May 1959 | |
| Terra Nova | Volume 10, Number 19; Volume 10, Number 40 | 9 May 1959; 21 November 1959 | Printer's Strike between June and August 1959; last Frank Hampson issue - Volume 10, Number 27; subsequently drawn by Frank Bellamy and others. |
| Trip to Trouble | Volume 10, Number 41; Volume 11, Number 11 | 28 November 1959; 12 March 1960 | |
| Project Nimbus | Volume 11, Number 12; Volume 11, Number 28 | 19 March 1960; 9 July 1960 | Drawn by Frank Bellamy, Don Harley and Gerry Palmer. |
| Mission of the Earthmen | Volume 11, Number 29; Volume 11, Number 52 | 16 July 1960; 24 December 1960 | |
| The Solid Space Mystery | Volume 11, Number 53; Volume 12, Number 23 | 31 December 1960; 10 June 1961 | |
| The Platinum Planet | Volume 12, Number 24; Volume 12, Number 47 | 17 June 1961; 25 November 1961 | |
| The Earth Stealers | Volume 12, Number 48; Volume 13, Number 9 | 3 December 1961; 3 March 1962 | |
| Operation Earthsavers | Volume 13, Number 10; Volume 13, Number 23 | | First story written by David Motton. |
| The Evil One | Volume 13, Number 24; Volume 13, Number 32 | | |
| Operation Fireball | Volume 13, Number 33; Volume 13, Number 42 | | |
| The Web of Fear | Volume 13, Number 43; Volume 13, Number 52 | | |
| Operation Dark Star | Volume 14, Number 1 Volume 14, Number 9 | | |
| Operation Time Trap | Volume 14, Number 10; Volume 14, Number 38 | | |
| The Wandering World | Volume 14, Number 39; Volume 15, Number 13 | | |
| The Big City Caper | Volume 15, Number 14; Volume 15, Number 22 | | |
| All Treens Must Die | Volume 15, Number 23; Volume 15, Number 42 | 6 June 1964; 17 October 1964 | |
| The Mushroom | Volume 15, Number 43; Volume 16, Number 6 | 24 October 1964; 6 February 1965 | |
| The Moonsleepers | Volume 16, Number 7 Volume 16, Number 29 | 13 February 1965; 17 July 1965 | |
| The Singing Scourge | Volume 16, Number 30; Volume 17, Number 6 | 24 July 1965; 5 February 1966 | |
| Give Me the Moon | Volume 17, Number 7 Volume 17, Number 26 | 12 February 1966; 25 June 1966 | Last story written by David Motton |
| The Menace from Jupiter | Volume 17, Number 27; Volume 18, Number 1 | 2 July 1966; 7 January 1967 | |

This story was followed by a reprint of Prisoners of Space (Volume 18, Number 2 – Volume 18, Number 51)

| Story Title | Source | Date | Notes |
|---|---|---|---|
| Underwater Attack | Volume 18, Number 52; Volume 19, Number 3 | 30 December 1967; 20 January 1968 | Drawn by Eric Kincaid |

This story was followed by a reprint of The Man From Nowhere (Volume 19, Number 4 – Volume 19, Number 32) and an abridged reprint of Rogue Planet (Volume 19, Number 33 – Volume 20, Number 17).

The original Eagle's run then came to an end when it was merged with Lion comic. Abridged reprints continued in black and white in Lion.

== 2000AD ==
Between 1977 and 1981 the Dan Dare character was revived to appear in the new 2000AD comic. For the first 45 progs (issues) of the comic, "Dan Dare" was considered to be the "lead" strip, and hence held the coveted centre-spread position, thus allowing the first two pages of the strip to be printed in colour. From prog 46 to prog 58, Dare was moved to the front cover, a move that not only allowed the fan favourite Judge Dredd to take the centre spread, but which also meant that by dispensing with the traditional single-image cover, the comic could effectively have an extra page of content.

| Story Title | Source | Date | Notes |
|---|---|---|---|
| Dan Dare | Progs 1-11 | 26 February 1977 - 7 May 1977 | Art: Massimo Bellardinelli / Script: Ken Armstrong, Pat Mills & Kelvin Gosnell Story also known as 'The Biogs'. |
| Hollow World | Progs 12-23 | 14 May 1977 - 30 July 1977 | Art: Massimo Bellardinelli / Script: Steve Moore |
| Legion | Progs 28-33 | 3 September 1977 - 8 October 1977 | Art: Dave Gibbons & Brian Bolland / Script: Gerry Finley-Day Start of 'The Lost Worlds' story arc. |
| Greenworld | Progs 34-35 | 15 October 1977 - 22 October 1977 | Art: Dave Gibbons & Brian Bolland / Script: Gerry Finley-Day |
| Star Slayer | Progs 36-51 | 29 October 1977 - 11 February 1978 | Art: Dave Gibbons / Script: Gerry Finley-Day |
| Doppelganger | Progs 52-55 | 18 February 1978 - 11 March 1978 | Art: Dave Gibbons / Script: Jack Adrian (Chris Lowder) |
| Waterworld | Progs 56-60 | 18 March 1978 - 15 April 1978 | Art: Dave Gibbons / Script: Jack Adrian (Chris Lowder) |
| Nightmare Planet | Progs 61-63 | 22 April 1978 - 6 May 1978 | Art: Brian Lewis / Script: Jack Adrian (Chris Lowder) |
| Ice World | Progs 64-66 | 13 May 1978 - 27 May 1978 | Art: Dave Gibbons / Script: Gerry Finley-Day |
| Garden of Eden | Progs 67-72 | 3 June 1978 - 8 July 1978 | Art: Dave Gibbons / Script: Jack Adrian (Chris Lowder) |
| Mutiny! | Progs 73-78 | 15 July 1978 - 19 August 1978 | Art: Dave Gibbons / Script: Jack Adrian (Chris Lowder) |
| The Doomsday Machine | Progs 79-85 | 26 August 1978 - 7 October 1978 | Art: Trevor Goring, Garry Leach & Dave Gibbons / Script: Henry Miller, Nick Landau & Roy Preston Conclusion of 'The Lost Worlds' story arc. |
| Servant of Evil! | Progs 100-107 | 17 February 1979 - 7 April 1979 | Art: Dave Gibbons / Script: Tom Tully Start of 'Servant of Evil' story arc. |
| Attack on Eternium! | Progs 109-118 | 21 April 1979 to 23 June 1979 | Art: Dave Gibbons / Script: Tom Tully |
| Traitor | Progs 119-126 | 30 June 1979 - 18 August 1979 | Art: Dave Gibbons / Script: Tom Tully Conclusion of 'Servant of Evil' story arc. |

== The relaunched Eagle comic ==
In 1982 Eagle was re-launched, with Dan Dare once again its flagship strip. The new character was the great-great-grandson of the original, with the only other surviving original character being the Mekon, although a descendant of Digby was later introduced:

- Return of the Mekon issues #1-33

== Revolver ==
In 1990, a strip entitled Dare, written by Grant Morrison and drawn by Rian Hughes, was serialized in Revolver. It presented bleak and cynical characters and was a not-too-subtle satire of 1980s British politics. Spacefleet had been privatised, the Treens were subjected to racist abuse in urban ghettos, Digby was unemployed, Professor Peabody committed suicide, and Dare's mentor Sir Hubert Guest betrayed Dare to the Mekon and his quisling British Prime Minister, Gloria Munday (whose appearance and demeanour appear modelled on Margaret Thatcher). Ultimately, Dare destroys London, the Mekon and himself through a smuggled nuclear weapon.

== The Planet ==
In 1996, The Planet published its first and only issue. Inside was a new and unfinished Dan Dare story, "Remembrance", drawn by Sydney Jordan featuring a slightly older Dare and apparently set some years after the original Eagle strips.

== Virgin Comics ==
In 2008, Virgin Comics published a 7-issue Dan Dare mini-series written by Garth Ennis, with art by Gary Erskine. The series is set several years after the original strips. Space Fleet has collapsed along with the UN due to nuclear war between China and America; Britain survived due to defensive shields made by Professor Peabody, and has become a world power again as a result with the Royal Navy taking Space Fleet's role. Peabody is the home secretary to a prime minister modelled on Tony Blair, who has sold Earth's defence out to The Mekon out of fear of overwhelming odds. Dare, assisted by Digby (who sacrifices himself in battle) leads a spirited defence of both Earth and his honourable principles.

== Notes and references ==
- Tatarsky, Daniel (2010). Dan Dare: the biography. Orion Books. pp. 208–237. ISBN 978-0-7528-8896-5.
