= Key Words Reading Scheme =

Series of children's early reading books

The Key Words Reading Scheme is a series of 36 English language early readers children's books, published by the British publishing company, Ladybird Books. The series is also often referred to as Peter and Jane, the names of the main characters.

Peter and Jane Book 1a Play with Us. Original 1964 front cover, illustrated by Harry Wingfield

Peter and Jane Book 1a Play with Us, ISBN 1-84422-360-4. Current edition, with cover styling updated in 2004 and the more contemporary late 1970s underlying artwork

== History ==
The first book in the series, Ladybird series 641, was published in 1964, and the series was completed by the first publication of the 36th book in 1967. Over 80 million books in the series have been sold worldwide, and the books remained in print until 2012. An updated version with new illustrations was announced in 2023 and released in 2024.

The books were designed as materials for teaching a small child to learn to read, using a system of key phrases and words devised by teacher William Murray. Murray was an educational adviser at a borstal and later headmaster of a "school for the educationally subnormal" in Cheltenham. From research undertaken in the 1950s by Murray with Professor Joe McNally, an educational psychologist at the University of Manchester, Murray realised that only 12 words account for a quarter of the vocabulary used in normal speaking, reading and writing in the English language, 100 words for half, and 300 words for three-quarters.

Starting with book 1a, a budding reader of primary school age, from 3 to 5 years old, is introduced to brother and sister Peter and Jane, their dog Pat, their Mummy and Daddy, and their home, toys, playground, the beach, shops, buses and trains, and so on. The first book uses the 12 key words which are used repeatedly ("Here is Peter", "Peter is here", "Here is Jane", "Jane is here", "I like Peter", "I like Jane"). Additional words are introduced gradually, page by page, to expand the reader's reading vocabulary, with the new words on each page set out in a footnote. The reader can consolidate their learning with books 1b, or practise writing in book 1c, all with the same vocabulary; or progress to book 2a (and 2b and 2c), and so on, with 12 sets of three books in all.

Two more characters, Simon and John, were introduced further into the series, as the books developed in length and detail to become targeted at growing children who had developed further reading skills. These two characters are cousins of Peter and Jane.

=== Illustrations ===
All of the books are small, thin hardback volumes with 56 pages, measuring 112 mm × 170 mm (4 3/8 in × 6 3/4 in). Each book has text on a left page and an illustration on the facing right page, drawn by artists Harry Wingfield, Martin Aitchison, Frank Hampson, Robert Ayton and John Berry. The illustrations vary in style from book to book, depending on artist, but Peter and Jane are recognisable throughout. The clear sans serif typeface used in the books starts at a large size and gradually becomes smaller as the reader progresses through the series. The sentence structure also becomes gradually more complex.

The books were first published in 1964, with a firmly 1950s feel to the illustrations provided by the furniture and clothing depicted (although things gradually get more 1960s and 1970s with later books), and the social context reflecting the life of a white, middle-class family. The books were revised and updated in 1970, and again in the late 1970s, to reflect changes in fashions and in social attitudes. For example, golliwogs were airbrushed out; Daddy takes a more active domestic role; and Jane moved out of skirts and dresses into jeans (although in some books, she still wears dresses but only occasionally), and abandoned her dolly for rollerskates. However, Peter still goes out to help Daddy, or actively plays with a ball, while Jane stays indoors to help Mummy, passively watches Peter, or plays with her doll despite abandoning it.

== List of books (Original series) ==
1. 1a: Play with us
2. 1b: Look at this
3. 1c: Read and write
4. 2a: We have fun
5. 2b: Have a go
6. 2c: I like to write
7. 3a: Things we like
8. 3b: Boys and girls
9. 3c: Let me write
10. 4a: Things we do
11. 4b: Fun at the farm
12. 4c: Say the sound
13. 5a: Where we go
14. 5b: Out in the sun
15. 5c: More sounds to say
16. 6a: Our friends
17. 6b: We like to help
18. 6c: Reading with sounds
19. 7a: Happy holiday
20. 7b: Fun and games
21. 7c: Easy to sound
22. 8a: Sunny days
23. 8b: The big house
24. 8c: Fun with sounds
25. 9a: Games we like
26. 9b: Jump from the sky
27. 9c: Enjoying reading
28. 10a: Adventure on the island
29. 10b: Adventure at the castle
30. 10c: Learning is fun
31. 11a: Mystery on the island
32. 11b: The carnival
33. 11c: Books are exciting
34. 12a: The holiday camp mystery
35. 12b: Mountain adventure
36. 12c: The open door to reading

== Updates till 2024 ==
Few changes have been made to the books since the 1970s all the way up to 2024, and they may be considered a source of social history. The books make use of the whole word or "look and say" technique which is generally considered outmoded as a method of reading education when not used in conjunction with phonics. Nevertheless, the books remain on sale in 2013, priced relatively cheaply at around £2.99 per book.

== Worldwide sales ==
In some Asian countries, particularly those which are also part of the British Commonwealth, the books are still widely used as a teaching aid in nurseries, preschools and kindergartens.

== See also ==
- Dick and Jane
- Janet and John
- Harry Wingfield
