= Company of Saint George =

Company of Saint George may refer to:

- Compagnia di San Giorgio, medieval Italian mercenary company during the Hundred Years' War
- Bank of Saint George, Genoese banking company that governed Corsica in the early modern era
- Company of Saynt George, a modern medieval re-enactment organization
