= Gerry Embleton =

British artist (born 1941)

- Born: London, U.K.
- Area: Artist
- Notable works: The Medieval Soldier; Time Machine

Gerry Embleton (born 1941) is a British artist, born in London. He is best known as an illustrator of military and historic subjects. He has illustrated more than 40 titles for the military publisher Osprey. He is the younger brother of illustrator Ron Embleton.

== Career ==
Embleton began as a comic strip artist, and worked on Look and Learn and TV Century 21 in the 1960s. He created the World War II science fiction strip Phantom Patrol for Odhams Press' Swift in 1962; it was reprinted as The Ghost Patrol in Smash! in 1966.

Embleton was the first artist to work on the new Dan Dare in the revived Eagle, published by IPC Magazines in 1982. This Dan Dare was the original's eponymous great-great-grandson, taking on the mantle of space explorer. Set 200 years after the original story, the first story-arc featured the return of Dan Dare's earliest nemesis, The Mekon.

In 1983, Embleton moved to Switzerland, and later began working in children's educational illustrations and then advertising.

In 1998, he founded a company called Time Machine that works with museums all over the world, specializing in vivid displays with 3D figurines.

Gerry Embleton is a founding member of the Company of Saynt George, a living-history association. His 1995 book The Medieval Soldier, co-authored with Tolkien illustrator John Howe, had a big influence on the living-history hobby as a whole.

He lives in Prêles near Neuchâtel. He also paints landscapes.
