= John Berry (illustrator) =

British illustrator

John Leslie Berry (9 June 1920 – 10 December 2009) was a British illustrator. He came up with the idea for the iconic Esso tiger adverts.

== Early life ==
Berry was born in 1920 Hammersmith, West London. His father was a foreman on the railway at Hammersmith who, in his son's words, "Skipped when I was five years old, my mum brought us up on £1 a week, my sister and me.". Berry, having displayed an early artistic talent, entered the Hammersmith School of Art in 1934, where he studied under Alfred Egerton Cooper and William Dring. His main interests at that time were figure paintings and etchings. At 19 Berry won a scholarship to the Royal Academy Schools but was unable to take it up owing to the outbreak of World War II.

== Career ==
From 1941 to 1944 Berry served as an official war artist in World War II, attached to the Eighth Army in North Africa and Egypt painting battle scenes. Some of these wartime paintings including '25 Pounder in action at Alamein' were exhibited at the National Gallery during the war before being moved to the Imperial War Museum. During this period he spent a lot of time in Cairo from where he was able to gather material for some of his other paintings. Berry began to paint scenes of the past which were witty and frivolous, genre paintings set in the 17th century or in his own period, and pictures of the Moslem world. With the aid of sketches, photographs and studio accessories he reconstructed, with a remarkable sense of monumental composition and fine colouring, scenes of oriental smokers, chess players, Moslems at prayer, cafes, dancers, interiors and palaces.

== Ladybird and other Books ==
Berry started his work for Ladybird in the late 1950s and between 1961 and 1978 he illustrated thirty five Ladybird books, working alongside Frank Hampson, Charles Tunnicliffe and Harry Wingfield. He worked on their Key Words Reading Scheme. These included the "People at Work" series, featuring jobs such as policeman, fireman, postman, potter, nurse, coal miner, farmer and engine driver. The series forms an almost complete record of British industry as it was at the time. He also illustrated all six books in the "Hannibal the hamster" series between 1976 and 1978, and publications such as Come to France, Come to Denmark, Come to Holland and Learning to Ride. Berry also illustrated many books and book covers for Corgi, Four Square, Panther, Penguin and Reader's Digest.

== Esso ==
One day in 1951 the secretary at McCann Erickson advertising agency asked Berry if he could draw a tiger for the Esso oil company account. "Yes, put a tiger in your tank," Berry retorted. For the next 10 years he continued to draw tigers for the campaign, but he made only a flat fee of £25 for the famous slogan, a story he much enjoyed telling.

== Portrait painter ==
After the war Mr. Berry moved to the joint services staff college (Amersham, Bucks) and there painted the portraits of many high-ranking military staff including all the past and present Commandants of the Joint Services Staff and these paintings are in a special gallery in the Staff College. Mr. Berry also has works in the Defence Academy of the United Kingdom, Imperial War Museum London and Maidstone Museum of Bentlif Art Gallery. Mr. Berry also traveled England painting portraits including Lady Ellerman, Sir Felix and Lady Brunner, Lady Astor and her two daughters, the DeHavilland daughters and many more. Over the next ten years Mr. Berry was commissioned to do portraits of Queen Elizabeth II, Prince Philip, Lady Astor, Diana, Princess of Wales (twice), George Bush Sr., His Highness Sheikh Zayed Bin Sultan Al Nahayan, Ruler of Abu Dhabi and President of the United Arab Emirates and other prominent people including Native American Indians.Mr. Berry provided a service for customers at Harrods department store, who would drop off photographs which he would then work up into oil paintings.

== Personal life ==
Berry married June East in 1951, with whom he had three sons and two daughters. June died in 1986 and he remarried in 1989 to Jessie Showell.

He retired to Hatton, Derbyshire. John Berry died in 2009 at age 89.
