= Frank Bellamy =

British comics artist (1917–1976)

- Bellamy in 1973
- Born: Frank Alfred Bellamy; 21 May 1917 Kettering, England
- Died: 5 July 1976 (aged 59) Kettering, England
- Areas: Penciller, Inker
- Notable works: Dan Dare; Thunderbirds; Garth

Frank Bellamy (21 May 1917 – 5 July 1976) was a British comics artist, best known for his work on the Eagle comic, for which he illustrated Heros the Spartan and Fraser of Africa. He reworked its flagship Dan Dare strip.

He also drew Thunderbirds in a dramatic two-page format for the weekly comic TV Century 21 and drew the newspaper strip Garth for the Daily Mirror from 1971 until his death. His work was innovative in its graphic effects and sophisticated use of colour, and in the dynamic manner in which it broke out of the then-traditional grid system.

== Biography ==
Born in Kettering, Northamptonshire, he started work at William Blamire's studio, in Kettering in 1933. Bellamy met his wife Nancy whilst he was stationed near Bishop Auckland during World War II and was married in 1942. In 1944 their son David was born to the couple. After the war, they lived in Kettering until 1949, when they moved to Morden in south London to be closer to publishers, most of whom were based in London. Bellamy worked freelance from home from the time he left Norfolk Studios in 1953. In 1975 the couple moved back to Geddington, near Kettering.

== Career ==
Whilst in the army, Bellamy had a weekly illustration published by the Kettering Evening Telegraph. Later, he worked in advertising (for Gibbs Dentifrice). In 1953, he began his first comic strip, called Monty Carstairs in Mickey Mouse Weekly. Shortly after he moved to Swift where his work included Swiss Family Robinson, King Arthur and Robin Hood.

In 1957, he moved to Eagle and began working in colour on their back page biography strips: The Happy Warrior (the life of Winston Churchill), The Shepherd King (the life of the biblical King David), and The Travels of Marco Polo for which Bellamy only did eight episodes before moving to Dan Dare.

Bellamy took over Dan Dare part way through the Terra Nova storyline, replacing creator Frank Hampson. It was an awkward set-up: the new owners of Eagle thought the strip looked dated, so gave Bellamy the brief of redesigning everything, from the costumes and spacecraft to the page layouts. Bellamy was left to draw the title page unaided (in contrast to Hampson's many-hands approach, where the drawing, inking, lettering and colouring were all separately completed by a team of artists), while two of Hampson's former assistants, Keith Watson and Don Harley, had to do the second page. Bellamy's redesigns were somewhat controversial and, after he left the strip a year later, the next artist was instructed to reintroduce the original designs.

Bellamy then went on to draw two of his most celebrated strips, Fraser of Africa and Heros the Spartan. He also drew Montgomery of Alamein (the life of Field Marshal Bernard Law Montgomery) and did some work for Look and Learn.

Fraser of Africa, one of Bellamy's artistic high-water marks, was not his idea but, as he was obsessed with Africa, he was the perfect choice to draw it. Bellamy used a monochromatic sepia colour palette to reflect the sun and desert locale, with occasional bursts of bright colour. It was a challenging and unusual approach and Fraser of Africa became the Eagle's most popular strip. Bellamy insisted on proper research and even had a reader living in East Africa supplying reference material.

Heros the Spartan, a sword and sorcery adventure set in Roman times was another artistic triumph. Drawn as a two-page spread and usually organized around a complicated splash in the centre of the two pages, Heros was a bravura display of skill. The battle scenes displayed a vividness and complex layout rarely seen in comics and it won Bellamy an award (for 'Best Foreign Artist') from the American Academy of Comic Book Arts in 1972.

Part of the cover of TV 21 showing Frank Bellamy's work on Captain Scarlet.

In November 1965, Bellamy left the fading Eagle to work for TV Century 21, where he drew the centrespread Thunderbirds strip. Rather than faithfully draw puppets, he took the artistic licence of rendering the characters as real people for a more exciting strip, as was already being done by the comic's other artists (including Ron Embleton and Mike Noble) in their strips. Apart from one short break, where Don Harley took over for 9 weeks, Bellamy drew Thunderbirds throughout its run in TV Century 21 and TV21, leaving shortly after the comic merged with Joe 90 Top Secret to become TV21 & Joe 90 in 1969. Bellamy also drew the colour splash pages for five Captain Scarlet and the Mysterons strips in the original run of "TV21". For the whole "TV21" Thunderbirds run, Bellamy created the double-page spread (plus a black and white page for 14 weeks) and then dropped back to just the double-page spread until issue 141 when the strip became two separate colour pages making syndication easier. He continued drawing two colour pages until the final issue of the "TV21" (number 242). He then drew four "Thunderbirds" strips for the new "TV21 & Joe 90" before leaving the grind of weekly comic strip production behind.

Bellamy's break from the Thunderbirds strip in the autumn of 1966 enabled him to work on an episode of the British TV series The Avengers entitled The Winged Avenger. The story featured a villainous strip cartoonist and Bellamy was asked to create all the illustrations used in the episode. He also designed all art used in the artist's studio set and the costume of the Winged Avenger himself. Filmed in December 1966, the episode aired in February 1967.

In June 1971, Bellamy began drawing the newspaper comic strip Garth which appeared in the Daily Mirror. This was the period in which intense competition with the new tabloid The Sun encouraged large helpings of nudity to be seen in British tabloids, and the strip reflected this. Bellamy's style was much more vivid than that of the original artist John Allard, and he was probably brought in to spice up the strip. Jim Edgar had been writing the strip since 1966 and shared the by-line credit with Bellamy. Bellamy applied all the graphic tricks in his arsenal from stippling and cross-hatching to chiaroscuro inking to create a modern and eye-catching look for Garth unlike anything else appearing in newspapers at the time.

Bellamy worked continuously on Garth for the next five years, although drawing in black and white rather than colour gave him time to maintain a number of other regular commissions. In 1969 he drew the first comic strips The Sunday Times had ever run in its magazine as non-fiction journalism. He also regularly produced illustrations for the BBC's Radio Times television listings magazine, in particular for the Doctor Who television programme.

Frank Bellamy died suddenly in 1976, at the height of his powers. He had plans for many projects, including a Western strip he was to write himself, inspired by the spaghetti westerns of Sergio Leone, three silent pages of which appeared in issue 1 of the Denis Gifford-edited "Ally Sloper" comics magazine, but no others were completed.

The Society of Strip Illustration (co-founded by Denis Gifford) named one of its awards after Bellamy: The Frank Bellamy Award for Lifetime Achievement.

== Bibliography ==
=== Comic strips drawn by Frank Bellamy ===
Mickey Mouse Weekly

- Monty Carstairs: The Secret of the Sands (25 July 1953 – 12 September 1953)
- Monty Carstairs: The Mystery of the Musical Box (19 September 1953 – 5 December 1953)
- Monty Carstairs: The Mystery of the Black Pearls (12 December 1953 – 20 March 1954)
- Monty Carstairs: The Men from the East (27 March 1954 – 26 June 1954)
- Walt Disney’s True Life Adventures: Living Desert top centre panels, in '4-color' colour (26 June 1954 – 31 July 1954)

Swift:

- The Fleet Family (1954)
- The Swiss Family Robinson (1954/55)
- Paul English (1955)
- King Arthur and his Knights (1955/56)
- Robin Hood and his Merry Men (1956/57)
- Robin Hood and Maid Marian (1957)

Eagle:

- The Happy Warrior (biography of Winston Churchill) (1957/58)
- Montgomery of Alamein (1958)
- The Shepherd King (the story of David) (1958/59)
- The Travels of Marco Polo (1959)
- Dan Dare (1959/60)
- Fraser of Africa (1960/61)
- Heros the Spartan (1962/65)

Boy's World

- Brett Million in "The Ghost World" (1963/64)

TV21:

- Thunderbirds (1966–69)
- Captain Scarlet and the Mysterons (1968)

Joe 90 Top Secret:

- Joe 90 (1969)

Garth:

- Sundance (75 of 87 instalments drawn by Bellamy) (July - 11 October 1971)
- The Cloud of Balthus (12 October 1971 – 27 January 1972)
- The Orb of Trimandias (28 January - 22 May 1972)
- Wolf Man of Ausensee (23 May - 6 September 1972)
- People of the Abyss (7 September - 23 December 1972)
- The Women of Galba (27 December 1972 – 10 April 1973)
- Ghost Town (11 April - 12 July 1973)
- The Mask of Atacama (13 July - 25 October 1973)
- The Wreckers (26 October 1973 – 18 February 1974)
- The Beast of Ultor (19 February - 5 June 1974)
- Freak Out to Fear (6 June - 27 September 1974)
- Bride of Jenghiz Khan (28 September 1974 – 14 January 1975)
- The Angels of Hell Gap (15 January - 2 May 1975)
- The Doomsmen (3 May - 15 August 1975)
- The Bubble Man (16 August - 28 November 1975)
- The Beautiful People (29 November 1975 – 16 March 1976)
- The Spanish Lady (17 March - 7 August 1976)
- The Man-Hunt (7 October - 25 October 1976) [completed by Martin Asbury -15 January 1977]

=== Books ===
- Century 21: Classic Comic Strips from the Worlds of Gerry Anderson - Volume 2 (Reynolds & Hearn, 2009) ISBN 978-1-905287-94-9 (paperback) / ISBN 978-1-905287-32-1 (hardback)
- Century 21: Classic Comic Strips from the Worlds of Gerry Anderson - Volume 1 (Reynolds & Hearn, 2009) ISBN 978-1-905287-93-2 (paperback) / ISBN 978-1-905287-19-2 (hardback)
- Dan Dare Deluxe Collector's Edition Volume 10 - PROJECT NIMBUS (Hawk Books, 1994)
- Eagle Classics: Fraser of Africa. (Hawk Books, 1990) ISBN 0-948248-32-7
- Timeview - The complete Doctor Who Illustrations of Frank Bellamy ( Who Dares Publishing, 1985) ISBN 0-948487-03-8 (paperback) / ISBN 0-948487-02-X (hardback)
- Garth. Book 2: The Women of Galba (with Jim Edgar). (Titan Books, 1985) ISBN 0-907610-49-8
- Garth. Book 1: The Cloud of Balthus (with Jim Edgar). (Titan Books, 1984) ISBN 0-907610-34-X
- High Command: The Stories of Sir Winston Churchill and General Montgomery (Dragon's Dream, 1981) ISBN 90-6332-851-6
- The Daily Mirror Book of Garth 1976 (with Jim Edgar). (IPC Magazines, 1975)
- The Daily Mirror Book of Garth 1975 (with Jim Edgar). (IPC Magazines, 1974)
- "A Cowboy Story" in Bert Fegg's Nasty Book for Boys and Girls (with Terry Jones & Michael Palin). (Methuen 1974) ISBN 0-413-32740-X
