= Robert Ayton (illustrator) =

British comics artist and illustrator

"Jack O'Lantern", from Eagle

Robert Norton Ayton (1915–1985) was a British comics artist and illustrator who worked for the Eagle and Ladybird Books.

He was born in Bowes Park, London and educated at the Harrow School of Art, and may also have attended the Central School of Art and Design and Hammersmith School of Art. He became a commercial artist with several advertising agencies before going freelance, drawing commissions for Castrol and Rolls-Royce among others. He was called up for military service during the Second World War, but returned to illustrating once demobbed.

He became friends with fellow illustrator Norman Williams, who recruited him for Marcus Morris' new comic, the Eagle, in 1950. He drew "Jack O'Lantern", a historical series about an orphan in the Napoleonic Wars, written by George Beardmore. When Williams died in 1957, Ayton drew the final episode of his strip, "The Great Sailor", a biography of Lord Nelson. He left "Jack O'Lantern" in 1959, after which it was drawn by Cecil Langley Doughty, but lasted only another 31 weeks. After two years away from comics, he drew illustrations for Girl, before returning to the Eagle to draw "The Golden Man", a biography of Sir Walter Raleigh written by Guy Daniel and Marcus Morris.

He went on to produce illustrations for Ladybird Books, the Oxford University Press and BBC Bristol, and taught illustration part-time at the West of England College of Art. From 1980 he was a member of the artistic group the Bristol Savages. In 1983 he and his wife Joan, who had no children, moved from Bristol to a smaller house in Nailsea, where two years later, aged 70, he died after a heart attack.
