= Swift (comic) =

Children's comic

- Cover from 1958, featuring "Smiley"

Publication information
- Publisher: Hulton Press(1954–1959); Odhams Press (1959–1963)
- Schedule: Weekly
- Format: Ongoing series
- Publication date: 20 March 1954 – 2 March 1963
- No. of issues: 461
- Editor: Marcus Morris

Swift was a British weekly comics magazine published by in the UK as a junior companion to the Eagle.

== Publication history ==
It was founded by the Rev. Marcus Morris and launched by Hulton Press in 1954. After Hultons were sold to Odhams Press in 1959, Swift absorbed Odhams' weekly title Zip and inherited a number of its strips. Swift was merged into the Eagle in 1963.

== Comics published in Swift ==
- Arty and Crafty by Geoffrey Bond and Martin Aitchison
- Calling U for Useless by Reg Parlett
- The Fleet Family, drawn by Frank Bellamy, 1954
- The Further Adventures of Robinson Crusoe, classic novel adaptation drawn by Richard Jennings
- Ginger and Co, drawn by Neville Colvin, 1960-62
- King Arthur and His Knights, by Clifford Makins and Frank Bellamy, 1955-56
- Lochinvar’s Ride, illustrated by D. C. Eyles
- Nigel Tawney, Explorer, drawn by Harry Winslade (as Redvers Blake)
- Paul English, drawn by Frank Bellamy, Giorgio Bellavitis 1955
- The Phantom Patrol, drawn by Gerry Embleton (later reprinted as The Ghost Patrol in Smash! in 1966)
- The Prisoner of Zenda, classic novel adaptation drawn by Patrick Nicolle, 1961
- The Red Rider, drawn by Jim Holdaway
- Robin Hood and His Merry Men, by Clifford Makins and Frank Bellamy, 1956-57
- Robin Hood and Maid Marian, by Clifford Makins and Frank Bellamy, 1957
- Sir Boldasbrass by John Ryan
- Smiley, about a young Australian boy, written by Moore Raymond
- Swiss Family Robinson, classic novel adaptation drawn by Frank Bellamy, 1954-55
- Tammy the Sheepdog, drawn by G. William Backhouse
- Tarna the Jungle Boy, drawn by Harry Bishop, 1954-63
- Tom Tex and Pinto, western drawn by Harry Bishop, 1954-55

== Archival holdings ==
The British Library holds copies of Swift from 20 March 1954 to 2 March 1963.
