= Fraser of Africa =

Cartoon strip in the Eagle comic, 1960–61

Fraser of Africa is a comic strip that ran one page a week in full colour in the British comic Eagle in 1960–61, written by George Beardmore and illustrated by Frank Bellamy. It follows Martin Fraser, a white hunter in the game reserves of colonial Tanganyika, as he tracks down an American film star who has gone missing on safari, hunts down European ivory poachers, and helps a Maasai warrior rescue his tribe from Arab slavers. Bellamy, who had long had a fascination with Africa, corresponded with a farmer in Kenya who advised him on the accuracy of the wildlife depicted, and used a limited palette of browns and yellows to capture the parched East African landscape, only occasionally breaking into blues and reds. A collected edition reprinting all three stories was published by Hawk Books in 1990.
In the Skinn & Gibbons interview Bellamy explained how he worked with the printer for Eagle, Bemrose, ensuring the colours he chose would print correctly as he wanted to emulate true African colours in the strip.

== Story Titles ==
- "Lost Safari" Eagle Vol.11:32-11:53, 12:1-12:4 (6 August 1960-31 December 1960, 7 January 1961-28 January 1961)
- "The Ivory Poachers" Eagle Vol.12:5-12:20 (4 February 1961-20 May 1961)
- "The Slavers" Eagle Vol.12:21-12:32 (27 May 1961-12 August 1961)
