= Luck of the Legion =

Cartoon strip series in the Eagle comic

Corporal Trenet (top left), Legionnaire Bimberg (bottom left), Sergeant "Tough" Luck (centre), art by Martin Aitchison

Luck of the Legion was a British adventure comics series, published in the magazine Eagle, written by Geoffrey Bond and illustrated by Martin Aitchison. It ran from 1952 to 1961.

The series followed the exploits of the French Foreign Legion in North Africa (then largely French-colonised or controlled) and focused mainly on the chisel-jawed British hero Sergeant "Tough" Luck and his faithful companions, Belgian Corporal Trenet and Italian Legionnaire Bimberg. Bimberg was the comic relief, short and fat and perpetually dishevelled, with a battered kepi. The strip was set in a vaguely pre - World War I period of colourful uniforms and unquestioned imperial values.

Sergeant Luck and his companions also saw service elsewhere in the French colonial empire - such as Indo-China or West Africa. However their adventures were normally focussed around isolated forts located in the Sahara. Adversaries were generally tribesmen whose dress was inexplicably Saudi Arabian rather than Algerian or Moroccan. However, on occasion Sergeant Luck found himself in conflict with unbalanced or traitorous senior officers.

== Novels ==
Because of the success of the Eagle comic strip, writer Geoffrey Bond wrote a series of novels based on the characters. These were:

- Luck of the Legion (Hutchinson - 195?)
- Sergeant Luck Takes Over (Hutchinson - 195?)
- Carry On, Sergeant Luck! (Hutchinson - 195?)
- Sergeant Luck's Secret Mission (Hulton Press - 1956)
- Sergeant Luck's Desert Adventure (Hulton Press - 1958)
- The Return of Sergeant Luck (Max Parrish - 1964)

Two of the above novels were also published in France under the Collection Signe de Piste (by Alsatia), with artwork by French artist Pierre Joubert. These novels were simultaneously published in both soft and hard covers:

- Les Tigres de Chaï-Fang (Sergeant Luck Takes Over) - 1968
- La Garnison Fantôme (Carry On, Sergeant Luck!) - 1969
