= Michael Varah =

British athlete

Personal information
- Born: 19 October 1944 Holy Trinity, Blackburn, England
- Died: 2 April 2007 (aged 62)
- Education: Loughborough College
- Spouse: Sally (née Rowat) Varah

Sport
- Sport: Athletics
- Event: Middle-distance running
- Club: Loughborough Colleges AC; Hercules AC

George Peter Michael Varah (19 October 1944 – 2 April 2007) was a British international middle-distance runner and later a Chief Probation Officer.

== Early life and education ==
Varah was eldest of triplet boys born in the vicarage of Holy Trinity, Blackburn to Dr. Chad Varah and his wife Susan. His father was the local Anglican vicar, who founded the Samaritans charity in 1953. His mother later became world president of the Mothers' Union in the 1970s.

Varah was educated at Raine's Foundation Grammar School for Boys in Stepney and at Loughborough College. He was an excellent track and field athlete, and captain of the Loughborough College athletics team. He became a member of the Great Britain athletics team in 1965, and ran the second leg in a 4 x 800m relay, that broke the world record at Crystal Palace in 1966.

He represented the England team at the 1966 British Empire and Commonwealth Games in Kingston, Jamaica, in the 880 yards.

He competed at the 1967 Summer Universiade (the Tokyo World Student Games). At one point, he held the British Indoor Athletics record at 800 metres. He competed for Hercules Athletic Club.

== Career ==
He became master in charge of athletics at Rugby School in 1968. He also worked as a volunteer tutor at Onley Borstal. After post-graduate study at Leicester University, he joined the Warwickshire Probation Service in 1973. He worked as a basic-grade probation officer, then ran Community Service in Warwickshire, and then became assistant chief of the West Midlands Probation Service. He became chief probation officer in Surrey in 1988. His rise from the lowest grade of probation officer to chief probation Officer was the fastest in the history of the Probation Service. He was the longest-serving chief officer in the National Probation Service when he retired in 2004, having spent 35 years working in the criminal justice system.

He also worked for many charities. He and a friend, Jim Higgins (also a probation officer), founded the Rugby Mayday Trust in Warwickshire. He also founded the independent Surrey Springboard Trust. He became chairman of Crimestoppers in 2004. He was a trustee of Samaritans, and of Victim Support. He also served on employment tribunals from 2005.

He was appointed as a Deputy Lieutenant of Surrey, and had been nominated to serve as High Sheriff of Surrey in 2008–9.

== Death ==
He died of viral double pneumonia. He was survived by his wife Sally (née Rowat), his father, and a daughter and a son.
