= Marc Laming =

British illustrator and designer

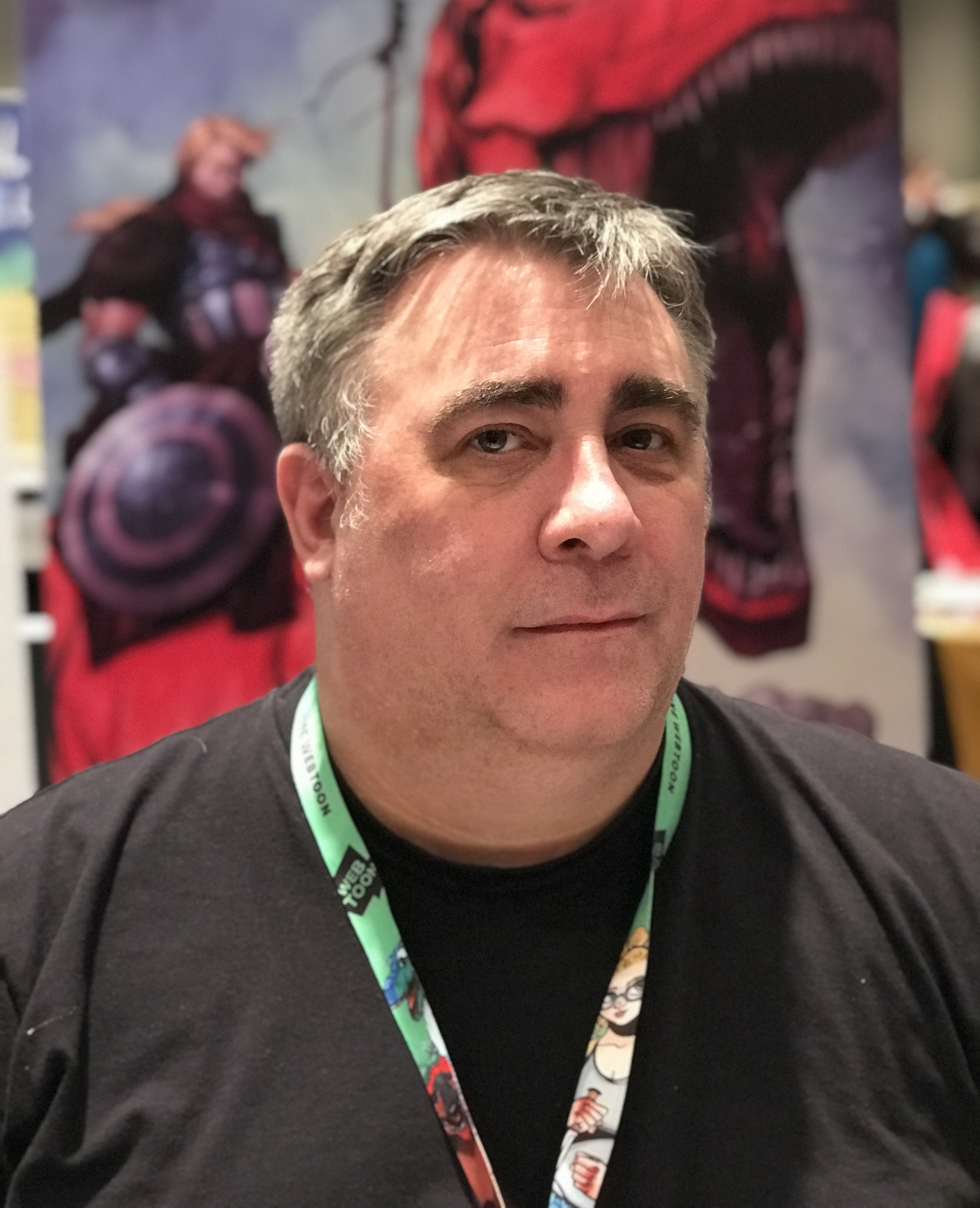
- Laming at the New York Comic Con
- Areas: Penciller, Inker, Colourist
- Notable works: Star Wars Titles at Marvel

Marc Laming, is a British illustrator and designer.

Laming began his career working for Fleetway Publications. He is best known for his work on Marvel's Star Wars titles and for illustrating the five-part Planet Hulk miniseries, that formed part of the 2015 Marvel Comics event "Secret Wars". His work includes comic books for Fleetway Publications, DC/Vertigo, Marvel, IDW, Dynamite, Dark Horse, Image and Boom!Studios. He has also worked for television and animation projects, storyboard and visuals for record companies.

He lives at Hatfield, Herefordshire, England.

== Bibliography ==
- Revolver (1990)
- Six Degrees (1995)
- The Dreaming (2000)
- Gyre (1997)
- American Century (2001)
- The Sandman Presents: Taller Tales (2003)
- Robert E. Howard's Savage Sword (2010)
- Bad Doings and Big Ideas: A Bill Willingham Deluxe Edition (2011)
- The Activity (2011)
- The Rinse (2011)
- Exile On The Planet Of The Apes (2012)
- Grindhouse: Doors Open At Midnight (2013)
- Splinter Cell - Echoes (2013)
- Kings Watch (2013)
- All-New Invaders (2014)
- Fantastic Four (2014)
- Hulk (2014)
- In The Dark (2014)
- Tom Clancy's Splinter Cell: Echoes (2014)
- King: The Phantom (2015)
- Marvel Free Previews Secret Wars (2015)
- Original Sin Companion (2015)
- Planet Hulk (2015)
- Uncanny Avengers Annual (2016)
- Ninjak (2016)
- Star Wars The Force Awakens (2016)
- Daredevil (2017)
- Star Wars Doctor Aphra Annual (2017)
- Wonder Woman Annual (2018)
- Batwoman (2018)
- Star Wars Annual (2018)
- Star Wars: Beckett (2018)
- James Bond 007 (2018–19)
- Star Wars Age Of Rebellion: Grand Moff Tarkin (2019)
- Star Wars Age Of Rebellion: Boba Fett (2019)
- Target Vader (2019)
- Endeavour (2026)

Forthcoming: Dan Dare: First Contact (scheduled for November 2026)
