= Ladybird Books =

British children's book series

- Parent company: Penguin Random House
- Founded: 1867; 159 years ago Loughborough, Leicestershire, England
- Founder: Henry Wills
- Country of origin: United Kingdom
- Headquarters location: London
- Publication types: Books
- Fiction genres: Children
- Official website: www.ladybird.co.uk

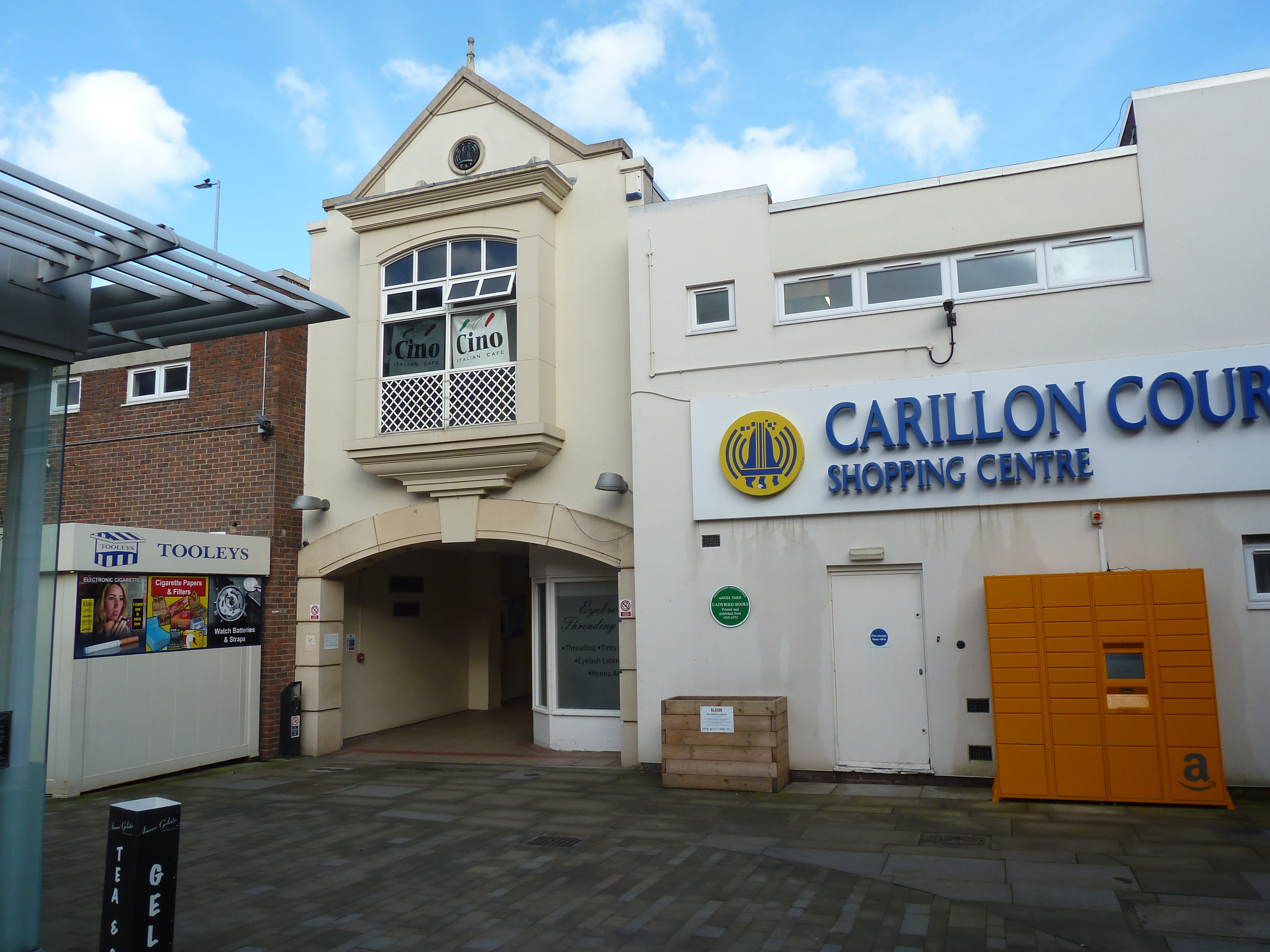
Angel Yard, Loughborough.

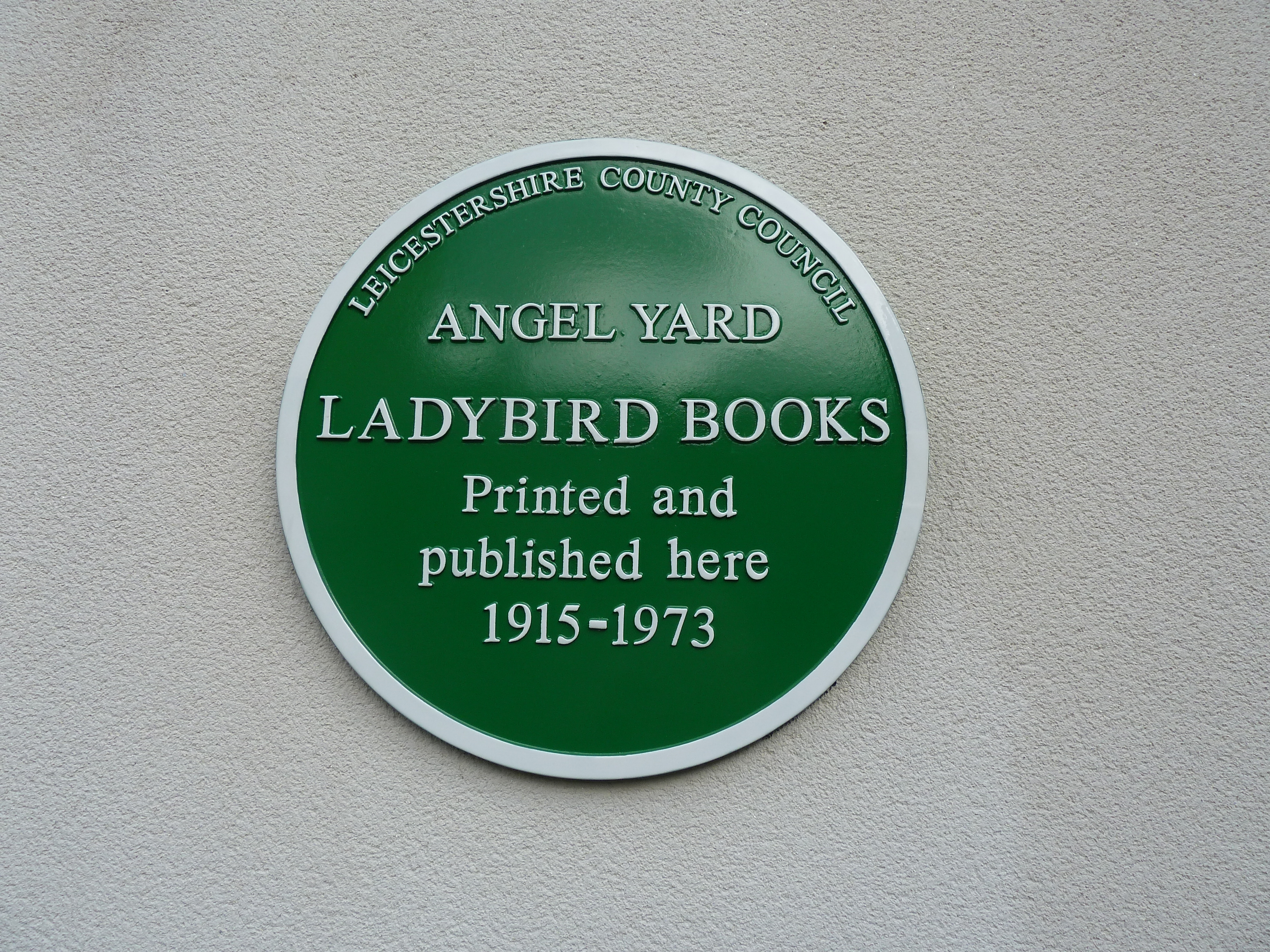
Ladybird Books green plaque, Angel Yard, Loughborough.

Ladybird Books are a London-based publishing company, trading as a stand-alone imprint within the Penguin Group of companies. The Ladybird imprint publishes mass-market children's books.

It is an imprint of Penguin Random House, a subsidiary of German media conglomerate Bertelsmann.

== History ==
The company traces its origins to 1867, when Henry Wills opened a bookshop in Loughborough, Leicestershire. Within a decade he progressed to printing and publishing guidebooks and street directories. He was joined by William Hepworth in 1904, and the company traded as Wills & Hepworth.

By August 1914, Wills & Hepworth had published their first children's books, under the Ladybird imprint. From the beginning, the company was identified by a ladybird logo, at first with open wings, but eventually changed to the more familiar closed-wing ladybird in the late 1950s. The ladybird logo has since undergone several redesigns, the latest of which was launched in 2006.

Wills & Hepworth began trading as Ladybird Books in 1971 as a direct result of the brand recognition that their imprint had achieved in Britain. In the 1960s and 1970s the company's Key Words Reading Scheme (launched in 1964) was heavily used by British primary schools, using a reduced vocabulary to help children learn to read. This series of 36 small-format hardback books presented stereotyped models of British family life: the innocence of Peter and Jane at play, Mum the housewife, and Dad the breadwinner. Many of the illustrations in this series were by Harry Wingfield, John Berry, Martin Aitchison, Frank Hampson and Charles Tunnicliffe.

In the 1960s, Ladybird produced the Learnabout series of non-fiction (informational) books, some of which were used by adults as well as children.

An independent company for much of its life, Ladybird Books became part of the Pearson Group in 1972. However, falling demand in the late 1990s led Pearson to fully merge Ladybird into its Penguin Books subsidiary in 1998, joining other established names in British children's books such as Puffin Books, Dorling Kindersley and Frederick Warne. The Ladybird offices and printing factory in Loughborough closed the same year, and much of the company's archive of historic artwork was transferred to public collections.

In November 2014, Ladybird signed up to the Let Books Be Books campaign and announced that it was "committed" to avoiding labelling books as "for girls" or "for boys" and would be removing such gender labelling in reprinted copies. The publisher added: "Out of literally hundreds of titles currently in print, we actually only have six titles with this kind of titling". Its parent company, Penguin Random House Children's division, would also be following suit.

Imprints of Ladybird Books included Balloon, Paperbird, Sunbird, and Disney.

=== Adults and parodies ===
In October 2015, it was announced that Ladybird books would be publishing its first series of books for adults. The eight books, which parody the style and artwork of the company’s books for children, include the titles The Hangover, Mindfulness, Dating and The Hipster, and were written by television comedy writers Jason Hazeley and Joel Morris. They were published on 18 November 2015. The series follows a trend of other spoof Ladybird books including We Go to the Gallery by Miriam Elia who had previously been threatened with legal action by Penguin. On 5 July 2016, Touchstone Books, an imprint of Simon & Schuster, announced that they would publish American adaptations of the Ladybird Books for Grown-ups, called The Fireside Grown-Up Guides.

Ladybird Expert (Series 117) was launched in January 2017 following the success of Ladybird for Grown-Ups. The books in this series are not parodies, but instead use the classic format to serve as clear introductions to a wide variety of subjects, generally in the fields of science and history. The first book published and the inspiration for the series is Climate Change by the Prince of Wales, Tony Juniper and Emily Shuckburgh. Four more titles were released in 2017 by Jim Al-Khalili (Quantum Mechanics), Steve Jones (Evolution), James Holland (The Battle of Britain) and Ben Saunders (Shackleton). The line was expanded with fifteen further books in 2018 and more titles were published in 2019.

== The classic Ladybird book ==
The pocket-sized hardback Ladybird measured roughly four-and-a-half by seven inches (11.5 cm by 18 cm). Early books used a standard 56-page format, chosen because a complete book could be printed on one large standard sheet of paper, a quad crown, 40 inches by 30 inches, which was then folded and cut to size without waste paper. It was an economical way of producing books, enabling the books to be retailed at a low price which, for almost thirty years, remained at two shillings and sixpence (12.5p).

The first book in the line, Bunnikin's Picnic Party: a story in verse for children with illustrations in colour, was produced in 1940. The book featured stories in verse written by W. Perring, accompanied by full-colour illustrations by A. J. (Angusine Jeanne) MacGregor. The appeal of Bunnikin, Downy Duckling and other animal characters made the book an instant success. Later series included nature books (series 536, some illustrated by, for example, Charles Tunnicliffe and Allen W. Seaby) and a host of non-fiction books, including hobbies and interests, history (L du Garde Peach wrote very many of these) and travel.

Ladybird began publishing books in other formats in 1980. Most of the remaining titles in the classic format were withdrawn in 1999 when their printing facility in Loughborough closed.
