= Company of Saynt George =

Swiss living history group

Company of St. George
- Founded: 1988
- Location: Europe, based in Switzerland
- Period: 1460-1490
- Speciality: Daily life
- Number of members: around 100
- Alliances: none
- Website: www.companie-of-st-george.ch

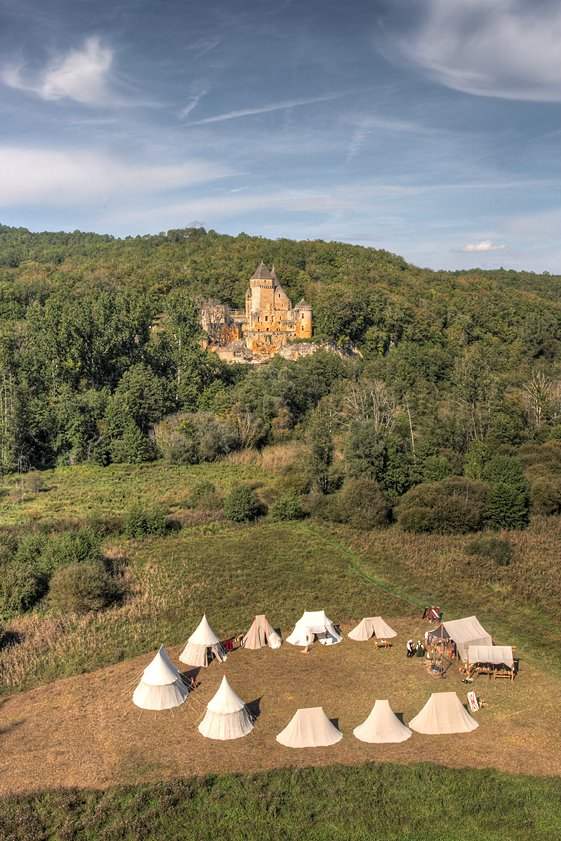
A camp of the Company of St. George, in France in 2006

The Company of St. George is a living-history group portraying an artillery Company in the age of Charles the Bold (1467-1477). The group does events with a civil and military aspect and is known for its display of daily life in a medieval camp.

== Name ==
There is no correct spelling for the name of the company. The group uses multiple styles on its website: The Company of Saynte George, The Company of Saynt George, The Companie of Saynt George, and The Compagnie of Saynte George. All variants seem to be equally correct.

== History ==
The Company of St. George was formed during the 1980s around Gerry Embleton and a group of history enthusiasts living in Switzerland. Traditionally the Company has retained a close link to other groups in the United Kingdom. The Company of St. George has been made popular with the book The Medieval Soldier, written by Gerry Embleton and John Howe, featuring over one hundred colour photographs of people in historical costume. It has been translated into French, German and Italian. The book came out in 1994 and had an influence on living-history and reenactment. This is especially true on the European continent where it helped to make living history a popular hobby and the second half of the 15th century one of the most popular periods for re-enactment.

== Membership ==
There are around one hundred people involved with the group and about sixty of them are considered active. The active members live in Switzerland, United Kingdom, France, Italy, Austria, Germany, Belgium, the Netherlands, Czech Republic, Poland, Hungary, Denmark and Sweden. Tolkien illustrator John Howe and the historical illustrator Gerry Embleton are prominent members.

== Events ==
The Company of St. George primarily works with museums and does living-history events in close cooperation with them. The ties with the Château du Haut-Kœnigsbourg are particularly strong. There are also private events.
