= Heros the Spartan =

"Heros the Spartan" illustrated by Frank Bellamy

Heros The Spartan appeared in Eagle from 1962 to 1966 and was created by Ken Mennell but was written solely by Tom Tully. It seems reasonable to assume that the film Spartacus (1960) inspired some of the story's creation. The comic strip began as a double-page centrespread colour strip and told the adventures of a Spartan, discovered as a child by the Roman commander Arcus and then adopted by him. On the death of his Roman father, Caesar sends for Heros. The Emperor explains that to become a legion commander he must prove himself by sailing to the ‘Island of Darkness’. From there the stories return to Rome and Caesar's treachery becomes apparent in the impossible tasks he sets. The 'sword and sorcery' stories take place in the Roman Empire but with many fantasy elements.

The remainder of the "Heros" stories were illustrated by Luis Bermejo in the comic and the Annuals, although in an interview Eric Kincaid tells of how he was asked to produce an episode in Bellamy's run but Bellamy hit the deadline and Kincaid's was never published.

"Heros the Spartan" drawn by Luis Bermejo

Some artwork by Bellamy and Bermejo was used by Al Williamson in his Creepy #6 story "Thumbs Up". and Barry Windsor-Smith also was inspired by Bellamy's work on "Heros".
A reprint of Frank Bellamy's run on "Heros" was published in two formats in 2013.

== Interest of the series ==
This series undoubtedly marks the apotheosis of Frank Bellamy's style, serving stories that, while not entirely original, are nevertheless well-crafted.

One of these pages was exhibited for a long time at the New York's Academy of Comic Book Arts and is undoubtedly related to the trophy won by Bellamy in 1972.

It's difficult to know the exact versions of Berjamo's work, as his adventures haven't been reprinted. However, some of his scattered pages are available online and demonstrate that the Spanish artist was up to the task.

== Story titles ==
- "Island of Darkness" Eagle Vol. 13:43 - 13:52, 14:1 - 14:9 (27 October 1962 - 29 December 1962, 5 January 1963 - 2 March 1963) - Illustrated by Frank Bellamy
- "The Eagle of the Fifth" Eagle Vol. 14:10 - 14:43 (9 March 1963 - 26 October 1963) - Illustrated by Frank Bellamy
- "The Man of Vyah" Eagle Vol. 14:44 (2 November 1963) - Vol. 15:22 (30 May 1964) - Illustrated by Luis Bermejo
- "Axe of Arguth" Eagle Vol. 15:23 - 15:42 (6 June 1964 - 17 October 1964) - Illustrated by Frank Bellamy
- "The Wolfmen" Eagle Vol. 15:43 (24 October 1964) - Vol. 16:8 (20 February 1966) - Illustrated by Luis Bermejo
- "The Slave Army" Eagle Vol. 16:9 - 16:30 (27 February 1965 - 24 July 1965) - Illustrated by Frank Bellamy
- "Heros the Outlaw" Eagle Vol. 16:31 (31 July 1965) - Vol. 17:3 (15 January 1966) - Illustrated by Luis Bermejo
- "Battle with the Gauls" Eagle Vol. 17:4 (22 January 1966) - Vol.17:26 (25 June 1966) - Illustrated by Luis Bermejo
- Eagle Annual 1965 - Illustrated by Luis Bermejo (4 pages)
- Eagle Annual 1966 - Illustrated by Frank Bellamy (8 pages)
- Eagle Summer Special (1966) - (4 pages)
- Eagle Annual 1967 - Illustrated by Luis Bermejo (8 pages)
