= Harry Wingfield =

English illustrator

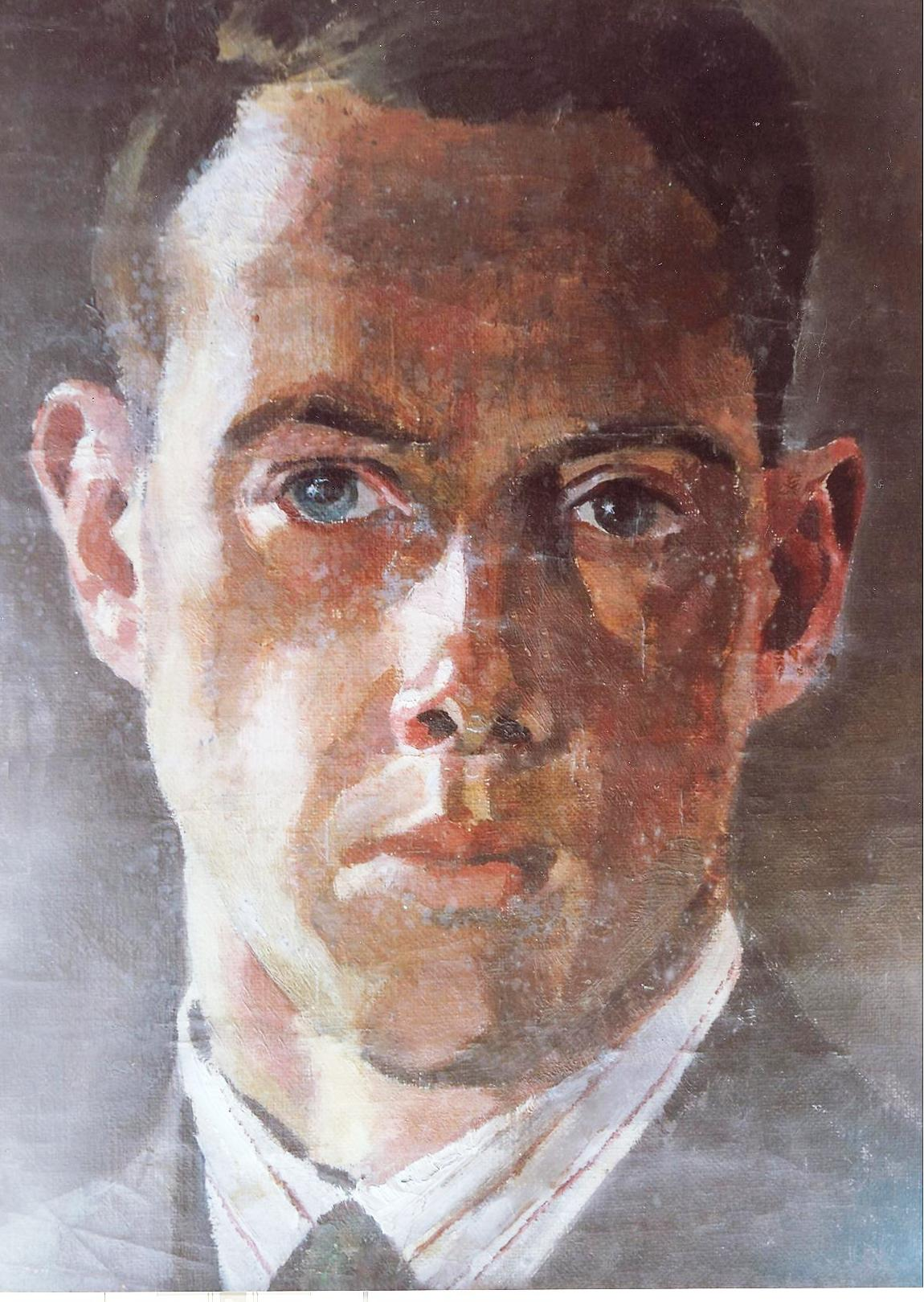
A self-portrait watercolour by Harry Wingfield in his early 30s

John Henry "Harry" Wingfield (4 December 1910 – 5 March 2002) was an English illustrator, best known for his drawings that illustrated the Ladybird Books Key Words Reading Scheme (also known as Peter and Jane) in the 1960s through to the 1980s, which sold over 80 million copies worldwide.

Wingfield was born in Denby, near Derby, the son of a blastfurnace man. He grew up in Manchester and Derbyshire. Hoping to become an engineer, he failed to obtain an apprenticeship to Rolls-Royce, which he thought was because of his stammer. He started his first job in an advertising agency in Derby, aged 16, and then worked in Walsall and Birmingham. He took evening classes in drawing, where he met his wife, Ethel and he served in the RAF in the Second World War as a driver in the RAF Regiment. Based in the Azores he painted camouflage but also gained a reputation for painting portraits of colleagues and family members. He worked as a graphic designer when he returned to England before working as a freelance illustrator for Ladybird in the 1950s.

His watercolours, along with those of Martin Aitchison, provided strong images to accompany the simple text devised by William Murray. Wingfield's wife Ethel, as an expert in early learning, was a significant collaborator. His best-known work accompanied books in the Key Words Reading Scheme brought out by Ladybird as competition to the widely-used Janet and John books. They conformed to stereotypes, with neat, obedient children; Peter helping Daddy with the car or in the garden, and Jane helping Mummy in the kitchen. They featured images initially based on photography of families on new council estates of the period, a market they targeted with phenomenal success.

Within a few years, new lifestyles meant that Wingfield's images were looking out of date, so he modernised the illustrations in the 1970s. The children became scruffier, and the domestic settings changed, though the books never truly reflected the social changes of the period.

Wingfield remained a freelance for most of his life and in 1989, Ladybird returned a catalogue of around 600 original pictures to him, some of which were sold at exhibition, but many of which he retained. He lived modestly, and after retirement continued to live in the house in Little Aston, near Walsall, where he had spent his working life as an artist.

Exhibitions of Wingfield's pictures were held in Walsall in 2002 and 2003 and across the UK, organised by Ladybird enthusiasts including the writer Cressida Connolly. His works, along with the books, have increased in value in recent years as Ladybird books and their accompanying illustrations have become more fashionable and therefore more collectable.

In late 2014, Ladybird books received major UK media coverage with the release of an iconic 'covers' collection to celebrate their 100th anniversary. Many of Harry Wingfield's illustrations were reproduced in the UK media as part of that announcement.

In May 2018, a collection of Wingfield's works, owned by a former neighbour, were shown on the BBC Television programme Antiques Road Show.

One of his famous books, Ladybird Book, featured an image of a woman with her brother and sister eating a breakfast and having tea which is featured in the Khong Guan biscuit can.
