= Chad Varah =

English activist and priest (1911–2007)

The Reverend Prebendary Chad Varah CH CBE
- Born: 12 November 1911; Barton-upon-Humber, England
- Died: 8 November 2007 (aged 95); Basingstoke, England
- Education: Keble College, Oxford; Lincoln Theological College
- Years active: 1935–2003
- Spouse: Susan Whanslaw (m. 1940–1993)
- Children: 5 (including Michael Varah)

Ecclesiastical career
- Religion: Christianity (Anglicanism)
- Church: Church of England
- Ordained: 1935 (deacon); 1936 (priest)

Edward Chad Varah CH CBE (12 November 1911 – 8 November 2007) was an English Anglican priest and social activist. In 1953, he founded the Samaritans, the world's first crisis hotline, to provide telephone support to those contemplating suicide.

== Life ==
Varah was born in the town of Barton-upon-Humber, Lincolnshire, the eldest of nine children of the vicar at the Anglican church of St Peter. His father, Canon William Edward Varah, a strict Tractarian, named him after St Chad, who, according to Bede, had founded the 7th-century monastery ad Bearum ("at Barrow"), which may have occupied an Anglo-Saxon enclosure next to Barton Vicarage.

He was educated at Worksop College in north Nottinghamshire and won an exhibition to study natural sciences at Keble College, Oxford, quickly switching to philosophy, politics and economics. He was involved in the university Russian and Slavonic clubs and was founder-president of the Scandinavian Club. He graduated with a third-class degree in 1933.

== Clerical career ==
Varah was initially reluctant to follow his father's vocation, but his godfather persuaded him to study at Lincoln Theological College, where he was taught by the Revd Michael Ramsey, later Archbishop of Canterbury. He was ordained deacon in the Church of England in 1935 and priest in 1936. He first served as curate at St Giles, Lincoln, from 1935 to 1938, then at St Mary's, Putney, from 1938 to 1940 and Barrow-in-Furness from 1940 to 1942. He became vicar of Holy Trinity, Blackburn, in 1942 and moved to St Paul, Battersea, in 1949. He was also chaplain of St John's Hospital, Battersea.

The Grocers' Company offered him the living of St Stephen Walbrook in 1953. He became rector of the church, designed by Christopher Wren, adjacent to the Mansion House in the City of London. The church was closed for structural repairs from 1978 to 1987. His son, Andrew, built chairs to replace its pews. Great controversy followed the installation of a large circular altar in travertine marble by Henry Moore, commissioned by Varah and his churchwarden Peter Palumbo. The matter was finally settled by the Court of Ecclesiastical Causes Reserved in 1987, which granted a retrospective faculty for its installation.

He was a supporter of female priests, but preferred the traditional 17th century Book of Common Prayer (1662) to the more modern liturgical changes authorized in 1966. Despite the absence of a permanent congregation, the church remained popular for weddings. He officiated at the marriage of Lady Sarah Armstrong-Jones, only daughter of Princess Margaret, to actor Daniel Chatto in 1994.

He was made an honorary prebendary of St Paul's Cathedral in 1975, becoming senior prebendary in 1997. He retired in 2003, aged 92, by which time he was the oldest incumbent in the Church of England.

== Samaritans ==
Varah began to understand the problems facing the suicidal when he was taking a funeral as an assistant curate in 1935, his first church service, for a fourteen-year-old girl who died by suicide because she had begun to menstruate and feared that she had a sexually transmitted disease. He later said "Little girl, I didn't know you, but you have changed the rest of my life for good." He vowed at that time to encourage sex education, and to help people who were contemplating suicide and had nowhere to turn.

To that end, Chad Varah founded the Samaritans in 1953 in the crypt of his church, with the stated aim that it would be an organisation "to befriend the suicidal and despairing." The phone line, MAN 9000 (for MANsion House), received its first call on 2 November 1953, and the number of calls increased substantially after publicity in the Daily Herald on 7 December 1953.

He was director of the central London branch of Samaritans until 1974, and president from 1974 to 1986. He was also founder chairman of Befrienders Worldwide (Samaritans International) from 1974 to 1983, and then its president from 1983 to 1986.

=== Future association with Samaritans ===
Later in life, Varah became disillusioned with the Samaritans organisation. He announced in 2004 that "It's no longer what I founded. I founded an organisation to offer help to suicidal or equally desperate people. The last elected chairman re-branded the organisation. It was no longer to be an emergency service. It was to be an emotional support for the whole bloody population whether they wanted it or not."

However, by the summer of 2005, a rapprochement appeared to be reached when Varah met with the Samaritans' new chief executive and chairman. Varah enthusiastically listened to the new essential work of the organisation, building on the work he had started in 1953. In 2006, Varah's eldest son, Michael Varah, was appointed to sit on the newly created board of trustees.

== Other works ==
He was also closely associated with the founding of the comic The Eagle by fellow clergyman Marcus Morris in 1950. He supplemented his income by working as a scriptwriter for The Eagle and its sister publications Girl, Robin and Swift until 1961. He used his scientific education to be "Scientific and Astronautical Consultant" (as Varah put it) to Dan Dare.

In line with a long-standing commitment to sex education, he was a member of the board of reference of the British edition of the adult magazine Forum from 1967 to 1987. He was patron of the Terrence Higgins Trust from 1987 to 1999 and an original patron of the Cult Information Centre.

He wrote a television play, "Nobody Understands Miranda", which was broadcast by the BBC as part of The Befrienders, an eleven-episode series about the Samaritans in 1972. The episode dealt with endogenous depression.

He continued his campaigning work into his later life, founding Men Against Genital Mutilation of Girls (MAGMOG) in 1992, and publishing his autobiography, Before I Die Again, referring to his interest in reincarnation, the same year.

== Honours and awards ==
Varah was awarded the Albert Schweitzer Gold Medal in 1972, and became an Honorary Fellow of Keble College in 1981. He held several honorary doctorates, and was awarded the Romanian Patriarchal Cross.

He was the subject of This Is Your Life in 1961 when he was surprised by Eamonn Andrews at the BBC Television Theatre.

He was appointed OBE in 1969, and advanced to CBE in 1995. He was created a Member of the Order of the Companions of Honour in 2000.

In 2012, three items of rolling stock in Britain were named Chad Varah:

- Direct Rail Services' 57302
- London Midland's 350232
- Virgin Trains West Coast's 390157

== Personal life ==
Chad Varah married Susan Whanslaw in 1940 in Wandsworth, south London. They had four sons (including triplets) and a daughter. His wife became World President of the Mothers' Union in the 1970s. She died in 1993. Varah died in a hospital in Basingstoke, four days before his 96th birthday. He was survived by four of his children, his son Michael having died several months before his father.

== Writings ==
- Before I Die Again: The Autobiography of the Founder of Samaritans. (London: Constable, 1992).
- The Samaritans in the '80s. (London: Constable, 1980).
