= Martin Aitchison =

English illustrator

"Luck of the Legion" from Eagle

Martin Henry Hugh Aitchison (21 November 1919 – 22 October 2016) was an illustrator for the Eagle comic from 1952 to 1963, and then one of the main illustrators for Ladybird Books from 1963 to 1990.

Aitchison was born in Kings Norton, Worcestershire (now part of Birmingham). He was educated at Ellesmere College in Shropshire, leaving aged 15 to attend the Birmingham School of Art and then Slade School of Art. He married fellow art student Dorothy Self.

He exhibited at the Royal Academy in 1939. He was deaf, excluding him from active service in the Second World War, but he worked for Vickers Aircraft as a technical illustrator. He produced drawings for the bouncing bomb designed by Barnes Wallis for the Dam Busters air raid.

He became a freelance commercial artist after the war, producing drawings for a range of magazines. His earliest work was for Hulton Press' Lilliput magazine. He drew for Girl, filling in for Ray Bailey on "Kitty Hawke and her All-Girl Air Crew", and illustrating "Flick and the Vanishing New Girl" in the first Girl annual. He began to work for the Eagle in 1952, drawing the French Foreign Legion strip "Luck of the Legion", written by Geoffrey Bond, for nearly ten years, including spin-off strips in ABC Film Review in 1952. He also drew spy series "Danger Unlimited" and adaptations of Sir Arthur Conan Doyle's The Lost World and C. S. Forester's Horatio Hornblower stories for the Eagle, and "Arty and Crafty", written by Geoffrey Bond, for Eagle's junior companion paper Swift. His work for comics displayed his talents in an exuberant and creative medium, working mainly from imagination.

He joined Ladybird Books in 1963, and joined Harry Wingfield in illustrating many titles in its new Key Words Reading Scheme books, also known as Peter and Jane, which were used to teach so many British children to read. The consistency, naturalistic style and attention to detail of the artist made him a favourite with the prolific British publisher and over a period of a quarter of a century, he illustrated at least 100 different titles. Martin Aitchison was not the only artist to make the switch from The Eagle to Ladybird; Frank Hampson and Frank Humphris also followed the same path.

He left Ladybird in 1987, and retired - apart from drawing a new comic strip, "Justin Tyme - ye Hapless Highwayman", written by Geoffrey Bond, and later his son Jim, for the fanzine Eagle Times from 1998 to 2004.

He died on 22 October 2016 at the age of 96.

== Comics bibliography ==
- "Kitty Hawke and her All-Girl Air Crew", Girl
- "Flick and the Vanishing New Girl, Girl Annual No 1
- "Luck of the Legion" written by Geoffrey Bond, Eagle Vol 3 No 5 – Vol 12 No 37, Eagle Annual No 3-10 (1952-1961)
- "Danger Unlimited", Eagle Vol 12 No 33 – Vol 13 No 9
- "The Lost World", Eagle Vol 13 No 10 – Vol 13 No 29
- "Hornblower R. N.", Eagle Vol 13 No 28 – Vol 14 No 9
- "Warrior with Tin Legs", Eagle Annual No 11 (1962)
- "Justin Tyme - Ye Hapless Highwayman", Eagle Times Vol 11 No 4 (Winter 1998) - Vol 17 No 1 (Spring 2004)
