= The Mekon =

Arch-enemy of comic strip hero Dan Dare

Publication information
- First appearance: Eagle comic #30 (vol. 1) - 3rd Nov 1950
- Created by: Frank Hampson

In-story information
- Species: Treen

The Mekon (/ˈmiːkɒn/ MEE-kon) of Mekonta is the arch-enemy of the British comic book hero Dan Dare. He first appeared on 3 November 1950 in the 30th episode of the Eagle comic strip Dan Dare, Pilot of the Future, having been created by Frank Hampson. Apart from Dan Dare himself, he is the only character to appear in every one of the numerous versions of the comic strip that appeared in the Eagle, 2000 AD and Virgin Comics. In the 1950s, roughly every other story featured the Mekon.

== Description ==
The Mekon was the ruler of the Treens of northern Venus, although he was ousted from this position at the end of the first story and had no fixed base of operations. He was created by scientific experimentation, engineered for very high intelligence. As such he had a swollen head containing his massive brain and atrophied body, and moved around on a levitating chair. He typically invented new superweapons in the pursuit of his goal: the domination of the universe for the purpose of scientific research. In some stories he also sought personal revenge on Dan Dare.

In the animated Dan Dare: Pilot of the Future television series (first aired in 2001), the animators took his nickname "Melonhead" literally and showed his cranium as not shiny smooth green but wrinkled like a cantaloupe. The voice of the Mekon for the series was portrayed by Rob Paulsen and by Richard Pearce for several audio drama adaptations.

== In popular culture ==
British politician Angus Maude and Irish journalist Patrick Cosgrave were each nicknamed "The Mekon". British political strategist Dominic Cummings has also been nicknamed "The Mekon".

In the "Genesis of A Classic" feature on the Doctor Who DVD release of Genesis of the Daleks, producer Philip Hinchcliffe cites the Mekon as one of his inspirations for the character Davros.

The early Pink Floyd song Astronomy Domine (1967) includes the line Stairway scare, Dan Dare, who's there? and Mekon appears on the Bob Lewis designed poster for the 13 February 1971 concert at the Farnborough College of Technology.

Elton John, in his "Rock of the Westies" album recorded in 1975, had a song called "Dan Dare (Pilot of the Future)". One of the key repeated lines in the song is "Dan Dare doesn't know it, he doesn't know it, but I like the Mekon".

British rock band The Mekons named themselves after the character in 1977, as did big beat artist Mekon.

British satirical magazine Private Eye ran a cartoon strip from 1987 titled "Dan Dire - Pilot of the Future?", featuring then-Labour Party leader Neil Kinnock as the eponymous hapless space pilot, accompanied by the gluttonous Pigby, modelled on deputy leader Roy Hattersley. Dire's arch-enemy was The Maggon, a Mekon-like parody of Prime Minister and Conservative Party leader Margaret Thatcher, whose followers were the Toreens.

In May 2013, the BBC radio soap opera The Archers featured a storyline in which regular character Brian Aldridge was aggrieved by a local newspaper article that compared him to the Mekon.

== Reception ==
The character has been described as very popular with the readers, rivalling in popularity the series protagonist himself. Mekon's popularity has inspired the designs of later British fictional villains, such as Doctor Who's Davros and Cybermen.

== Analysis ==
Given the Christian undertones of Eagle, the character of Mekon has been compared to Satan, an embodiment of all evil in the Dan Dare's universe. The Mekon has been described as "a rich composite of racial stereotypes", in particular, the Oriental Yellow Peril. Given that his powers come from his extreme intelligence, hatching plots and inventions (doomsday devices and the like), Mekon can also been as "an expression of the British public's growing distrust of the power wielded by science".

== Bibliography ==
- Dudley Jones, Tony Watkins, "A necessary fantasy?: the heroic figure in children's popular culture", Routledge, 2000, ISBN 0-8153-1844-8, pp. 166–168
- Mike Conroy, "500 Comicbook Villains", Collins & Brown, 2004, ISBN 1-84340-205-X, p. 334
- Maurice Horn, "The World encyclopedia of comics, Volume 1", Chelsea House Publishers, 1976, ISBN 0-87754-042-X, p. 194
