= Marcus Morris (publisher) =

English Anglican priest and publisher (1915–1989)

The Reverend Marcus Morris OBE
- Born: John Marcus Harston Morris; 25 April 1915; Preston, Lancashire, England
- Died: 16 March 1989 (aged 73); London, England

John Marcus Harston Morris OBE (25 April 1915 – 16 March 1989) was an English Anglican priest who founded the Eagle weekly comic in 1950, launched the British edition of Cosmopolitan in 1972, and was deputy chairman of the National Magazine Company.

== Early life ==
Born in Preston, Lancashire, the son of a clergyman, Morris grew up in Southport. He attended Dean Close School in Cheltenham, before reading Classics at Brasenose College, Oxford on an ecclesiastical scholarship, then theology at Wycliffe Hall, Oxford.

== Career ==
Morris was ordained deacon of the Church of England in Liverpool in 1939, and priest in 1940.

After a chaplaincy in the RAF and postings in Great Yarmouth, Norfolk, and Weeley, Essex, he became vicar of St James' Church, Birkdale, Lancashire, in 1945, where he published a magazine, The Anvil, which contained illustrations and design by Frank Hampson, articles by C. S. Lewis, Harold Macmillan, Dorothy L. Sayers and Chad Varah, and short stories for children by Geoffrey Trease, and circulated far beyond his parish, although it did not sell well and put Morris in considerable debt.

In 1948 Morris and Chad Varah were part of a group of diocesan editors who formed the Society of Christian Publicity, which took over publishing The Anvil. At its inaugural meeting Morris spoke about the kinds of periodical the Church should be publishing, including a "strip-cartoon magazine for children". In February 1949 he wrote an article for the Sunday Dispatch entitled "Comics that bring Horror into the Nursery", in which he decried the violence and sensationalism of American crime and horror comics and their effects on British children, after which he and Hampson set out to produce a more wholesome, uplifting alternative. They devised a proposed strip for the Sunday Empire News called Lex Christian, about the adventures of a brave inner-city parson, but it fell through after the paper's editor died. They turned their attention to creating a new weekly comic, entitled the Eagle. Hampson and fellow artist Harold Johns put together a series of dummies, and Morris presented them to various publishers, of whom Hulton Press agreed to publish it. The first issue proper went on sale on 14 April 1950.

Morris and his family moved to Epsom, Surrey, in 1950, and Hampson set up a studio on their house. In November 1951 Morris launched Girl, a girls' counterpart to the Eagle, followed by Robin (1953), for younger children, and Swift (1954), for an audience younger than Eagle and Girl but older than Robin.

From 1954 to 1959 he was managing editor of Hultons' Housewife magazine, and he was also appointed a member of the Hulton Press management committee. He left Hultons in 1959 when they were taken over by Odhams Press, joining the National Magazine Company, a subsidiary of the Hearst Corporation, as editorial director. However, he continued to write serials for the Eagle in the early 1960s, mostly on historical or religious subjects and often in collaboration with Guy Daniel, including "The Golden Man", a biography of Sir Walter Raleigh drawn by Robert Ayton, and "The Road of Courage", a retelling of the life of Christ illustrated by Hampson and Joan Porter.

He became managing director and editor-in-chief of the National Magazine Company in 1964. He was responsible for launching the British edition of Cosmopolitan, created the distributor Comag in association with Condé Nast, and increased the circulation of his magazines at a time when the market was declining. He became deputy chairman in 1979, received the OBE in the 1983 New Year Honours, and retired in 1984.

== Personal life ==
Having been briefly engaged to model Rita Foyle, he married actress Jessica Dunning in 1941, and they had four children.

== Later years and death ==
In his later years he lived in Midford, Somerset, and died on 16 March 1989, aged 73, at the King Edward VII Hospital for Officers, London. A memorial service was held at St Bride's Church, Fleet Street, where he had been honorary chaplain from 1952 to 1983.
