= Frank Hampson =

British illustrator

- Born: 21 December 1918 Audenshaw, Lancashire, England
- Died: 8 July 1985 (aged 66) Epsom, Surrey, England
- Areas: Writer, artist
- Notable works: Dan Dare

Frank Hampson (21 December 1918 – 8 July 1985) was an English illustrator. He is best known as the creator and artist of Dan Dare and other characters in the boys' comic, the Eagle, to which he contributed from 1950 to 1961.

== Biography ==
Hampson was born at 488 Audenshaw Road, Audenshaw, near to Manchester (now Tameside), and was educated at King George V School, a grammar school in Southport. His brother Eric was killed in a naval action during the Second World War. He married Dorothy Mabel Jackson in 1944 and in 1947 they had a son, Peter.

In 1949, in collaboration with Anglican vicar Rev. Marcus Morris, he devised a new children's magazine, the Eagle, which Morris took to the Hulton Press. In April the following year, a revised version of the Eagle hit the bookstalls. Its most popular strip was Hampson's creation Dan Dare, Pilot of the Future. He wrote and drew Dan Dare's Venus and Red Moon stories, plus a complete storyline for Operation Saturn. However, Hampson drew only part of the Saturn story and his script was altered when he passed the strip to assistants.

Like Alex Raymond and Milton Caniff in the U.S., Hampson instituted a studio system where, originally in Southport and later from his home in Epsom, Surrey, as many as four artists might work on two pages of the strip at any one time. When Hulton Press was bought up in 1959, and the Eagle moved to a new publisher, Hampson's studio system was disbanded due to its cost.

He drew The Road of Courage, a carefully researched and meticulously crafted telling of the life of Jesus, with the help of his longtime assistant, Joan Porter, which concluded at Easter 1961. Hampson then began to devise seven other strip cartoon ideas, which he intended to offer to the Eagle. Partly through his own mismanagement (he told no-one what he was doing) Longacre Press accused him of breach of contract. He was forced to resign, his new strips were impounded by the legal department, and he rarely drew for comics again. The remainder of Hampson's life was spent working as a freelance commercial artist for various publications including Ladybird Books: one such book was ' The Stories of our Christmas Customs ', 1964, Series 664, written by N.F.Pearson. Between 1964 and 1970 he also illustrated ten books for Ladybird Books, including Nursery Rhymes, Kings and Queens, and Peter and Jane.

Hampson was voted Prestigioso Maestro at an international convention of strip cartoon and animated film artists held at Lucca, Tuscany in 1975. A jury of his peers gave him a Yellow Kid Award and declared him to be the best writer and artist of strip cartoons since the end of the Second World War. In 1978 he graduated from the Open University. He celebrated by drawing a Dan Dare strip for the university's internal magazine. The punch line of the script involved the university getting an application from Dare's nemesis The Mekon.

In ailing health, Hampson died from a stroke and the lingering effects of throat cancer in July 1985, in Epsom, Surrey, England.
