= Tahir Hemphill =

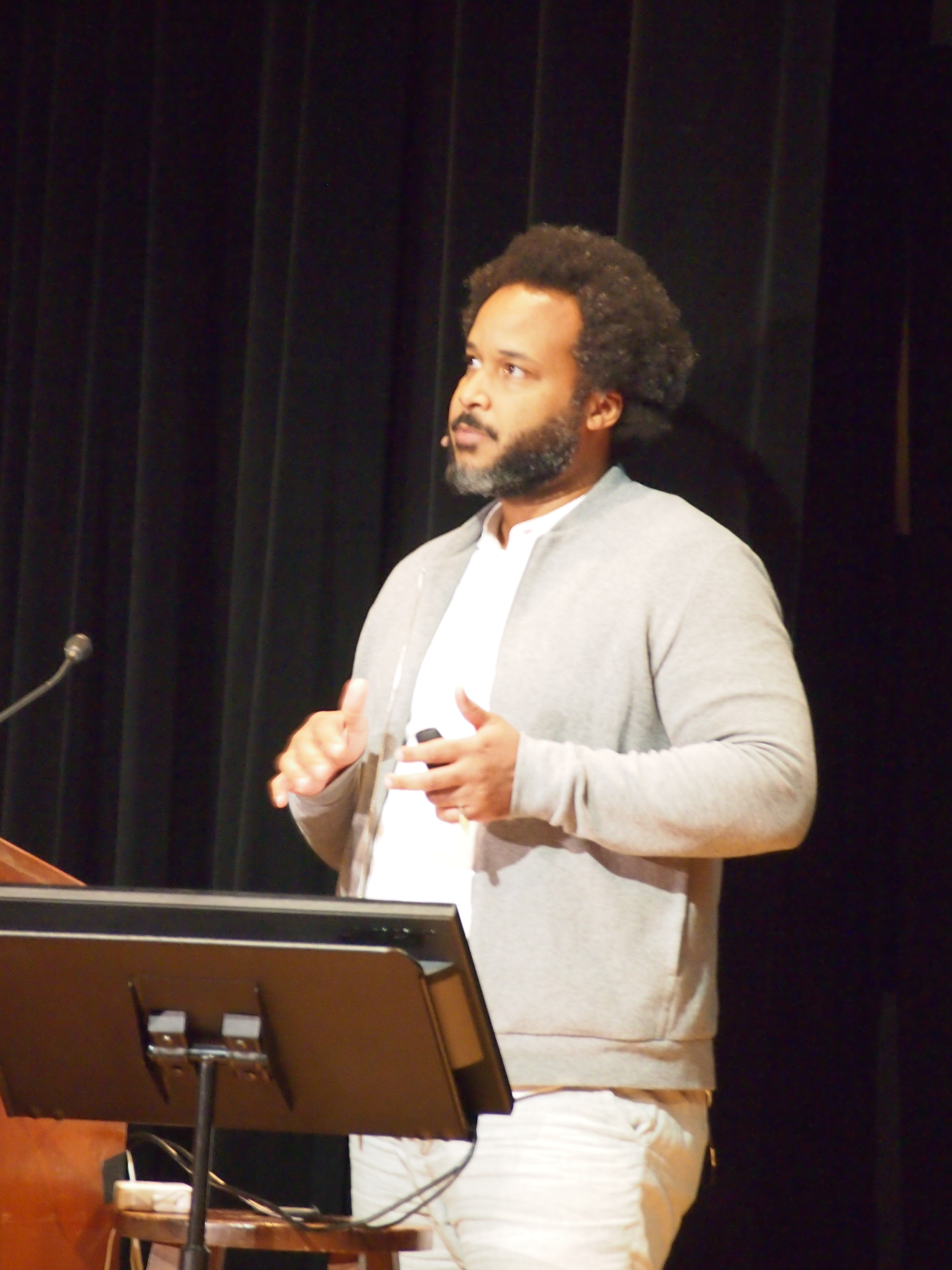
- Born: May 14, 1972 (age 53); New York City, US
- Education: Morehouse College; Pratt Institute
- Known for: Creative technology Multimedia art Photography; Sculpture

Tahir Hemphill (born May 14, 1972) is an American multimedia artist, ethnolinguist, and design researcher. He developed the Hip Hop Word Count database.

== Early life ==
Hemphill grew up in New York City, on the Lower East Side of Manhattan. He graduated from Brooklyn Technical High School with a Regents diploma concentration in Electrical Engineering. He is African-American.

Hemphill graduated from Morehouse College with a B.A. in Spanish. He has a certificate in Strategic Planning from Miami Ad School. He has a master's degree in Communications Design which he received from Pratt Institute.

== Career ==
=== Hip-Hop Word Count database ===
Hemphill created an ethnographic database of hip-hop lyrics covering the period from 1979 to the present. In the database, assets are geotagged and dated according to album release dates. Hemphill calls this data a geography of language in the universe of hip-hop. Hemphill faceted the information with analysis of word count, number of syllables per word, number of letters per word, polysyllabic words, as well as an education and audience reading level rating. Hemphill used Simplified Measure of Gobbledygook ("SMOG") and Flesch–Kincaid readability tests (created by plain English advocate Rudolf Flesch) to evaluate reading levels. Within his analysis of Hip-Hop through a scientific lens, he aims to trace origins of certain slang words, how they move to different communities, and their malleable, fluid meanings in different contexts.

== Fellowships, grants, etc. ==
- 2010-2011: Artist-in-Residence, Eyebeam
- 2012: Grantee, Creative Capital
- 2012-2013: Fellow, WEB Du Bois Institute at Harvard University
- 2013: Fellow, The Frank-Ratchye STUDIO for Creative Inquiry at Carnegie Mellon University
- 2015: AIM Program participant, Bronx Museum of the Arts

== Exhibitions ==
- 1999: "Black New York Photographers of the Twentieth Century." Schomburg Center for Research in Black Culture
- 2002: "Queens International Biennial." Queens Museum of Art
- 2002: SIGGRAPH
- 2011: "Talk to Me." Museum of Modern Art. July 24, 2011 - November 7, 2011
- 2012: "The Box That Rocks: 30 Years of Video Music Box and the Rise of Hip Hop Music & Culture. " Museum of Contemporary African Diasporan Arts. March 10 - May 28, 2012

== Works and publications ==
- Hemphill, Tahir. Visual Alchemy: Subversive Graphic Design in the Urban Environment. Master's Thesis. New York, NY: Pratt Institute: December 1999.
