= Automated readability index =

Type of readability test for English texts

The automated readability index (ARI) is a readability test for English texts, designed to gauge the understandability of a text. Like the Flesch–Kincaid grade level, Gunning fog index, SMOG index, Fry readability formula, and Coleman–Liau index, it produces an approximate representation of the US grade level needed to comprehend the text.

The formula for calculating the automated readability index is given below:

$$4.71 \left (\frac{\mbox{characters}}{\mbox{words}} \right) + 0.5 \left (\frac{\mbox{words}}{\mbox{sentences}} \right)  - 21.43$$

where characters is the number of letters and numbers, words is the number of spaces, and sentences is the number of sentences, which were counted manually by the typist when the above formula was developed. Non-integer scores are always rounded up to the nearest whole number, so a score of 10.1 or 10.6 would be converted to 11.

Unlike the other indices, the ARI, along with the Coleman–Liau, relies on a factor of characters per word, instead of the usual syllables per word. Although opinion varies on its accuracy as compared to the syllables/word and complex words indices, characters/word is often faster to calculate, as the number of characters is more readily and accurately counted by computer programs than syllables. In fact, this index was designed for real-time monitoring of readability on electric typewriters.

| Score | Age | Grade level |
| 1 | 5-6 | Kindergarten |
| 2 | 6-7 | First grade |
| 3 | 7-8 | Second grade |
| 4 | 8-9 | Third grade |
| 5 | 9-10 | Fourth grade |
| 6 | 10-11 | Fifth grade |
| 7 | 11-12 | Sixth grade |
| 8 | 12-13 | Seventh grade |
| 9 | 13-14 | Eighth grade |
| 10 | 14-15 | Ninth grade |
| 11 | 15-16 | Tenth grade |
| 12 | 16-17 | Eleventh grade |
| 13 | 17-18 | Twelfth grade |
| 14 | 18-22 | College student |
