= Dale–Chall readability formula =

Test for ease of reading a text

The Dale–Chall readability formula is a readability test that provides a numeric gauge of the comprehension difficulty that readers come upon when reading a text. It uses a list of 3000 words that groups of fourth-grade American students could reliably understand, considering any word not on that list to be difficult.

== History ==
The formula was inspired by Rudolf Flesch's Flesch–Kincaid readability test which used word-length to determine how difficult a word was for readers to understand. Edgar Dale and Jeanne Chall instead used a list of 769 words that 80% of fourth-grade students were familiar with, such as "no", "yes", and other such very basic words to determine which words were difficult. The Dale-Chall Readability Formula was originally published in their 1948 article A Formula for Predicting Readability and updated in 1995 in Readability Revisited: The New Dale-Chall Readability Formula, which expanded the word list to 3,000 familiar words (text file version).

== Formula ==
The formula for calculating the raw score of the Dale–Chall readability score (1948) is given below:

$$0.1579 \left (\frac{\mbox{difficult words}}{\mbox{words}}\times 100 \right) + 0.0496 \left (\frac{\mbox{words}}{\mbox{sentences}} \right)$$

If the percentage of difficult words is above 5%, then add 3.6365 to the raw score to get the adjusted score, otherwise the adjusted score is equal to the raw score. Difficult words are all words that are not on the word list, although it must be considered that the word list contains the basic forms of e.g. verbs and nouns. Regular plurals of nouns, regular past tense forms, progressive forms of verbs etc. should be included in the calculation.

Score	Notes
4.9 or lower	easily understood by an average 4th-grade student or lower
5.0–5.9	easily understood by an average 5th- or 6th-grade student
6.0–6.9	easily understood by an average 7th- or 8th-grade student
7.0–7.9	easily understood by an average 9th- or 10th-grade student
8.0–8.9	easily understood by an average 11th- or 12th-grade student
9.0 or higher	easily understood by an average college student

== See also ==
- Readability
