= George R. Klare =

American psychologist

George Roger Klare (April 17, 1922 – March 3, 2006) was a World War II veteran and a distinguished professor of psychology and dean at Ohio University. His major contribution was in the field of readability. From the beginning of the 20th century, the assessment of the grade level of texts for different grades of readers was a central concern of reading research. It was well known that without correctly graded texts, readers would not improve their reading skill. There were over 1,000 published studies on this topic. Klare's contribution to that effort came both in his critical reviews of the studies and his participation in original research.

== Early life ==
George R. Klare was born April 17, 1922, in Minneapolis, Minnesota, son of George C. Klare, and Lea L. (Launer) Klare. He served as senior class president in North Bend High School in North Bend, Nebraska and graduated from that school in 1940. He received a Regents Scholarship to the University of Nebraska, where he studied before being called into the Army Air Force in 1942. He then took more college and officer training at the University of Missouri.

== World War II ==
Following military and flight training, Klare served as a navigator on B-17 bombers in the Eighth Air Force in England. On Dec. 31, 1944, he was shot down over Germany. He spent the rest of World War II in German POW camps. He was liberated by advancing Soviet troops from Stalag Luft One on May 1, 1945. He was honorably discharged as a First Lieutenant in December, 1945, receiving the Air Medal, the Purple Heart, European area ribbons and the Prisoner of War medal.

Klare later recounted his experiences as a prisoner of war in a chapter entitled "Questions" in Interrogations, Confessions, and Entrapment, published by Springer in 2004. In this extraordinary account, Klare tells how he narrowly escaped death three times on January 3, 1945. While on a railroad car en route to the Luftwaffe Interrogation Center, Klare survived a friendly-fire bombing in the rail yard in Fulda, Germany, the target on this third mission one week earlier. Klare and his crew were ordered by a German guard to remove packages from the Fulda freight station that was on fire from the Allied bombing. The guard then ordered the men out of the burning building just before it collapsed. A crowd of angry German civilians soon gathered near the collapsed freight station. The German guard, who was an English-speaking Luftwaffe captain, was armed only with a pistol. Yet he managed to hold off the mob and take Klare and his crew to a safe building. "I owe my life to him,” Klare wrote. “He was the bravest man I ever saw.”

Klare remained active in veterans' issues the rest of his life. His contributions include:

- A Few Good Men.
- Veterans History Project.
- WOUB Online: WWII Veterans.
- In addition to his chapter in Interrogations, Confessions, and Entrapment, he published several magazine articles about the psychological effects of war. His wartime writings were reprinted in The Haunting Memories of War, a dual memoir co-authored with his son Roger.

== Academic life ==
After World War II, Klare earned a BA degree cum laude in 1946, an MA degree in 1947, and a PhD degree in 1950 in psychology from the University of Minnesota. After working for The Psychological Corporation in New York City and the University of Illinois, he became an assistant professor of psychology in 1954 at Ohio University.

It was during that period, he published, with Byron Buck, Know Your Reader: The Scientific Approach to Readability. This work introduced to the public the extensive research behind the popular readability formulas of the likes of Rudolf Flesch and Robert Gunning. The book showed the average reader in America was an "adult of limited reading ability," with half the population reading below the 9th-grade level. The readability formulas could be used to select and create literature and texts of different reading levels. Without appropriately graded texts, people will not read or improve their reading skill.

His other books include Elementary Statistics (with P. A. Games), A Manual for Readable Writing, How to Write Readable English, and The Measurement of Readability. He also published 85 articles and book chapters.

Klare won a Fulbright grant to the Open University of England. He also won the Best of Show award in the Journal Article Competition of the International Technical Communication Conference in 1978 and the Oscar S. Causey Award for Outstanding Contributions to Reading Research in 1981, and was elected to the Reading Hall of Fame of the International Reading Association in 1997. He served on the editorial boards of eight journals, as well as The Literary Dictionary. He is listed in Who's Who in America and was listed in the Fourth Edition of Who's Who in the World.

In 1978, he was named Distinguished Professor of Psychology. While at Ohio University, he served as chair of the Psychology Department from 1959 to 1963, as acting dean of the College of Arts and Sciences in 1965–66 and in 1984–85, and as Dean of the College of Arts and Sciences from 1966 to 1971. He was also acting associate provost for graduate and research programs from 1986 until his retirement in 1987.

== Reading research ==
Most of the basic research on the readability formulas was done in the first half of the 20th century. The later half was a very contentious period in reading research (especially regarding phonetics). In spite of the controversy, Klare and a few colleagues persisted and focused on:

- Consolidation and confirmation of earlier research.
- Developing new formulas and fine-tuning older ones.
- Other variables affecting readability besides the grade-level of text.
- Features of the reader affecting readability.

As the unofficial chronicler of this ongoing research, Klare published four landmark reviews, The Measurement of Readability in 1963, "Assessing Readability" in 1975 (which was named a Citation Classic by the Institute for Scientific Information), "Readability" in 1984. and "Readable Computer Documentation" in 2000.

Later, as the U.S. military invested heavily in readability research, he participated in several important studies that showed the usefulness of readability formulas in improving the 1. comprehension, 2. retention, 3. reading speed, and 4. reading persistence of technical manuals and instructional materials.

Klare also conducted or participated in research on the features of the reader that effected readability: 1. prior knowledge, 2. level of reading skill, 3. interest, and 4. motivation. In one 1976 analysis of 35 readability experiments, Klare showed how important it is to control for these variables when doing reader research.

The century ended with a more complete view of those variables affecting reading success, much of it due to Klare's efforts. Readability, it turned out, is not an absolute residing in the text, but is a product of the interaction between the reader and the text. In the text, those variables that affect readability are 1. content, 2. grade level (style), design, and organization. In the reader, the variables are 1. prior knowledge, 2. level of reading skill, 3. interest, and 4. motivation.

George R. Klare died on March 3, 2006, at his home in The Plains, Ohio, from pneumonia at the age of 83. He was survived by his wife, Julia M. Klare; a daughter, Deborah Fox of Vero Beach, Fla.; a son, Roger, and daughter-in-law, Connie Schmittauer, of Dublin, Ohio; and a daughter, Barbara, and son-in-law, Galen Fultz, of San Anselmo, Calif. He has a grandson, McCoy, and a granddaughter, Zoe, also of San Anselmo; a granddaughter, Sivan, of Portland, Ore.; and a step-sister, Dorothy Launer, of Fremont, Neb.

== Bibliography ==
1. Analysis of the readability level of selected United States Armed Forces Institute printed instructional materials. The Journal of Educational Research, 1973, 67, 176.
2. Assessing readability. Reading Research Quarterly, 1974–75, 10, 62–102.
3. Assessing readability. Chapter 1 (Section 4) in L. J. Chapman and P. Czerniewska (Eds.), Reading from Process to Practice. London: Routledge and Kegan Paul, in association with Open University Press, 1978, 248–274.
4. Automation of the Flesch "Reading Ease" readability formula, with various options. (With P. P. Rowe, M. G. St. John, and L. M. Stolurow.) Reading Research Quarterly, 1969, 4, 550–559.
5. Citation Classic: Klare, G. R. Assessing readability. Current Contents: Social and Behavioral Sciences, 20, No. 47, November 21, 1988, and Current Contents: Arts and Humanities, 20, No. 47, November 21, 1988.
6. Cognitive activities of beginning and advanced college writers: A pausal analysis. (With G. M. Schumacher, F. C. Cronin, and J. D. Moses.) Research in the Teaching of English, 1984, 18, 169–187.
7. Cognitive processes during pauses in writing. (With G. M. Schumacher, F. C. Cronin, and J. D. Moses.) In J. A. Niles and L. A. Harris (Eds.) Thirty-second Yearbook of the National Reading Conference. Rochester, New York: National Reading Conference, 1983.
8. Cognitive processes in journalistic genres. (With G. Schumacher, B. Scott, F. Cronin, and D. Lambert.) Written Communication, 1989, 6, 390–407.
9. The cloze procedure: A convenient readability test for training materials and translations. (With H. W. Sinaiko and L. M. Stolurow.) International Review of Applied Psychology, 1972, 21, 77–106.
10. The cloze procedure in adult basic education. (With M. A. Sherman.) Journal of Reading, 1972, 15, 624.
11. Comments. (On papers by Curran, Muller, and others.) In T. G. Sticht and D. W. Zapf (Eds.), Reading and Readability Research in the Armed Services. Alexandria, VA: Human Resources Research Organization, 1976, 202, 265, 282–289.
12. Comments on Bormuth's "Readability: A new approach." Reading Research Quarterly, 1966, 1, 119–125.
13. Comments on "Cinematography as a method of research." Journal of Counseling Psychology, 1959, 6, 243–244.
14. Components of answers to multiple-choice questions on a published reading comprehension test: An application of the Hanna–Oaster approach. (With E. B, Entin.) Reading Research Quarterly, 1980, 25, 228–236.
15. Differential relationships of two versions of cloze tests to vocabulary and reading comprehension. (With E. B. Entin.) In M. L. Kamil and A. J. Moe (Eds.), Reading #Research: Studies and Applications. Twenty-eighth Yearbook of the National Reading Conference. Clemson, SC: The National Reading Conference, 1979, 68–71.
16. Elementary Statistics: Data Analysis for the Behavioral Sciences. (With P. A. Games.) New York: McGraw–Hill, 1967.
17. Factor analyses of three correlation matrices of readability variables. (With E. B. Entin.) Journal of Reading Behavior, 1978, 10, 279–290.
18. Factors relating to correspondence and other non-traditional instruction: The role of readability. In ERIC Clearinghouse in Reading and Communication Skills, with abstract in Research in Education, November, 1973.
19. Feedback: Principles and analogies. (With F. C. Johnson.) Journal of Communication, 1962, 12, 150–159.
20. The formative years. In B. L. Zakaluk and S. J. Samuels (Eds.), Readability:Its Past, Present, and Future. Newark, DE: International Reading Association, 1988, 14–34.
21. Further experiments in language translation: A second evaluation of the readability of computer translations. (With H. W. Sinaiko.) ITL (Review of Applied Linguistics), 1973, 19, 29–52.
22. Further experiments in language translation: Readability of computer translations. (With H. W. Sinaiko.) ITL (Review of Applied Linguistics), 1972, 15, 1–29.
23. General models of communication research: A survey of the developments of a decade. (With F. C. Johnson.) Journal of Communication, 1961, 11, 13–26.
24. How to Write Readable English. London: Hutchinson, 1985.
25. Instructor's manual to accompany Elementary Statistics: Data Analysis for the Behaznoral Sciences. (With P. A. Games.) New York: McGraw–Hill, 1967.
26. Interpolation of instructional objectives during "breaks" in recorded speech lectures. (With P. A. Games and F. C. Johnson.) Speech Monographs, 1967, 34, 437–442.
27. Introduction. (To Testing and Grading articles.) In S. Scholl and S. Inglis (Eds.), Teaching in Higher Education. Columbus, OH: Ohio Board of Regents, 1977.
28. Judging readability. Instructional Science, 1976, 5, 55–61.
29. Know Your Reader. (With B. Buck.) New York: Hermitage House, 1954. Chapter 11 reprinted in James I. Brown (Ed.), Efficient Reading.
30. A Manual for Readable Writing. Glen Burnie, MD: REM Co., 1975.
31. A Manual for Readable Writing, Fourth Revised Edition. Glen Burnie, MD: REM Co., 1980.
32. Matching materials to readers: The role of readability estimates in conjunction with other kinds of information about comprehensibility. In T. L. Harris and E. J. Cooper (Eds.), Reading, Thinking, and Concept Development. New York: The College Board, 1985.
33. The Measurement of Readability. Ames, IA: Iowa State University Press, 1963. Chapter One reprinted in the August, 2000 issue, ACM Journal of Computer Documentation, 24, 107–121.
34. The Measurement of Readability. (Sixteen pages translated into French and reprinted in Comment Mesurer la Lisibilite. Brussels, Belgium: Editions Labor, and Paris, France: Fernand Nathan, 1975.)
35. Measures of the readability of written communication: An evaluation. The Journal of Educational Psychology, 1952, 43, 385–389.
36. Measuring the Readability of High School Newspapers. Parts 1 and 2. (With L. R. Campbell.) Iowa City, JA: Quill and Scroll Foundation, 1967.
37. A note on "Simplification of the Flesch Reading Ease formula." Journal of Applied Psychology, 1952, 36, 53
38. Operational consequences of literacy gap, (With J. D. Kniffin, C. R. Stevenson, E. B. Entin, S. L. Slaughter, and L. Hooke.) Brooks AFB, TX: Air Force Systems Command, May, 1980 (AFHRL-TR-79-22).
39. A possible framework for the study of readability. In T. E. Curran (Ed.), Tri-Service Literacy and Readability: Workshop Proceedings. NPRDC Special Report 80-12. San Diego, CA: Navy Personnel Research and Development Center, March, 1980, 86–89.
40. Practical Aspects of Readability, Milton Keynes, England: Institute of Educational Technology, The Open University, 1981.
41. Questions. In G. D. Lassiter (ed.), Interrogations, Confessions, and Entrapment. New York: Kuwer Academic/Plenum, 2005.
42. A reaction to Chicago's TV college: A televised open learning model. In S, A. Harrison and L. M. Stolurow (Eds.), Educational Technologies: Productivity in Higher Education. Washington, DC: U.S. Department of Health, Education, and Welfare, January, 1974.
43. Readability. (Invited essay.) In T. L. Harris and R. E. Hodges (Eds.), The Literacy Dictionary. Newark, DE: International Reading Association, 1995.
44. Readability. (Signed entry.) In B. B. Wolman (Ed.), International Encyclopedia of Psychiatry, Psychology, Psychoanalysis, and Neurology. Boston, MA: Aesculapius Publishers, 1977.
45. Readability. (Signed entry.) In H. E. Mitzel (Ed.), Encyclopedia of Educational Research. Fifth Edition. New York: The Free Press, 1982, 1520-1531.
46. Readability. (Signed chapter.) In P. D. Pearson (Ed.), Handbook of Reading Research. New York: Longman, 1984, 681-744.
47. Readability and behavior modification training texts: Updated findings. (With F. Andrasik, S. R. Edlund, and R. A. Butz.) Behavioral Counseling Quarterly, 1982, 2, 183–189.
48. Readability and comprehension. In R. S. Easterby and H. Zwaga (Eds.), Visual Presentation of Information. London: Wiley, 1984.
49. Readability indices: Do they inform or misinform? Information Design Journal, 1981, 2, 251–255.
50. Readability of behavior modification texts: Cross-comparison and comments. (With F. Andrasik and W. Murphy.) Behavioral Therapy, 1976, 7,539–543.
51. Readability of materials and student comprehension. In Reading and Beyond. Report of the Helen M. Robinson-Third Annual Reading Conference. Athens, OH: College of Education, Ohio University, 1979.
52. Readability of patient consent forms: Comparison and cross-check of different types from different sources. (With A. Saville and C. J. Denbow.) The DO, April, 1984, 102–104.
53. Readability: Passage difficulty and context dependency. In Resources in Education, January, 1982.
54. Readability standards for Army-wide publications. Fort Benjamin Harrison, IN: Directorate of Evaluation, U.S. Army Administration Center, 1979. (Evaluation Report 79-1.)
55. Readability and The Living Word Vocabulary (Invited review). Information Design Journal 1991, 6, 246–247.
56. Readable computer documentation. Invited essay. ACM Journal of Computer Documentation, 2000, 24, 148–168.
57. Readable technical writing: Some observations. Technical Communication, 1977, 24, 1–5. Received outstanding article award (Best of Show), 25th International Technical Communication Conference, Dallas, TX, May, 1978.
58. Reading interests of airmen during basic training. (With L. M. Gustafson and J. E. Mabry.) San Antonio, TX: Human Resources Research Center, Lackland AFB, November, 1953. (Research Bulletin 53–54.)
59. Recapitulation. In T. E. Curran (Ed.), Tri-Sennce Literacy and Readability: Workshop Proceedings. NPRDC Special Report 80-12. San Diego, CA: Navy Personnel #Research and Development Center, March, 1980, 86–89.
60. The relationship of format organization to learning. (With E. H. Shuford and W. H. Nichols.) Educational Research Bulletin, 1958, 37, 39–45.
61. The relationship of human interest to immediate retention and to acceptability of technical material. (With J. E. Mabry and L. M. Gustafson.) Journal of Applied Psychology, 1955, 35, 92–95.
62. The relationship of immediate retention of technical training material to career preferences and aptitudes. (With L. M. Gustafson and J. E. Mabry.) The Journal of Educational Psychology, 1955, 46, 321–329.
63. The relationship of patterning (underlining) to immediate retention and to acceptability of technical material. (With J. E. Mabry and L. M. Gustafson.) Journal of Applied Psychology, 1955, 39, 40–42.
64. The relationship of style difficulty, practice, and ability to efficiency of reading and to retention. (With E. H. Shuford and W. H. Nichols.) Journal of Applied Psychology, 1957, 41, 222–226.
65. The relationship of style difficulty to immediate retention and to acceptability of technical material. (With J. E. Mabry and L. M. Gustafson.) The Journal of Educational Psychology, 1955, 46, 287–295.
66. The relationship of typographic arrangement to the learning of technical training material. (With W. H. Nichols and E. H. Shuford.) Journal of Applied Psychology, 1957, 41, 41–45.
67. The relationship of verbal communication variables to immediate and delayed retention and the acceptability of technical training materials. (With J. E. Mabry and L. M. Gustafson.) San Antonio, TX: Air Force Personnel and Training Research Center, Lackland AFB, December, 1954. (Research Bulletin 5–103)
68. The relationships of measures of interest, prior knowledge, and readability to comprehension of expository passages. (With E. B. Entin.) In B. Hutson (Ed.), Advances in Reading/Language Research, Vol. III. Greenwich, CN: JAI Press, 1985.
69. Research critique. Elementary English, 1971, 48, 675–681,
70. Re-opening the cloze blank issue. (With R. Rush.) Journal of Reading Behavior, 1978, 10, 208–210.
71. The role of word frequency in readability. Elementary English, 1968, 45, 12–22. Reprinted in J. R. Bormuth (Ed.), Readability in 1968 (A Research Bulletin Prepared by a Committee of the National Conference on Research in English, 1968).
72. Review of Charles M. Redfield, Communication in Management. Journal of Applied Psychology, 1954, 38, 138–39.
73. Review of Eleanor M. Peterson, Aspects of Readability in the Social Sciences. Journal of Applied Psychology, 1957, 41, 41–45.
74. Review of Stanley L. Levin, "Gyro Fundamentals" (a learning program). Training, 1964, 1, 10.
75. Review of Jeanne S. Chall, Readability: An Appraisal of Research and Application. Educational Research Bulletin, 1959, 38, 49–50.
76. Review of May Katzen, The Visual Impact of Scholarly Articles. The Library Journal, 1979,49,229-231.
77. A second look at the validity of readability formulas. Invited essay. Journal of Reading Behavior, 1976, 8,129-152.
78. Selecting textbooks: Some preliminary thoughts. (With M. Macdonald-Ross.) In J. E. Merritt (Ed.), New Horizons in Reading. Proceedings of the Fifth World Congress in Reading, Vienna, Austria, August 12–14, 1974. Newark, DE: International Reading Association, 1976, 318–330.
79. A selective split-level bibliography on programmed instruction. East Lansing, MI: Program Press, 1963.
80. Some empirical predictors of readability. In E. Z. Rothkopf and P. E. Johnson (Eds.), Verbal Learning Research and the Technology of Written Instruction. New York: Teachers College Press, Columbia University, 1971.
81. Some interrelationships of readability, cloze, and multiple-choice scores on a reading comprehension test. (With E. B. Entin.) Journal of Reading Behavior, 1978,10, 417–436.
82. Student behavior while reading from text. (With G. M. Schumacher.) In Resources in Education, October, 1981.
83. Student reactions to topics in general psychology. (With A. H. Fuchs and M. S. Pullen.) American Psychologist, 1957,12, 219–221.
84. A table for rapid determination of Dale–Chall readability scores. Educational Research Bulletin, 1952, 31, 43–47.
85. Textbooks. (With J. Hartley.) In D. J. Unwin and R. MacAleese (Eds.), Encyclopedia of Educational Media, Communication and Technology. London: The Macmillan Press, Ltd., 1978, 770–776.
86. Understandability and indefinite answers to public opinion questions. International Journal of Opinion and Attitude Research, 1950, 44, 91–96.
87. What readability can do for you. (With R. S. Laubach.) Syracuse, NY: New Readers Press, 1964.
88. Writing to inform: Making it readable. Information Design Journal, 1979,1, 98–105.
89. Writing with a helping hand. In H. B. Pepinsky (Ed.), People and Information. New York: Pergamon Press, 1970.

== See also ==
- Readability
