= Jeffrey Vinokur =

American science educator and entertainer

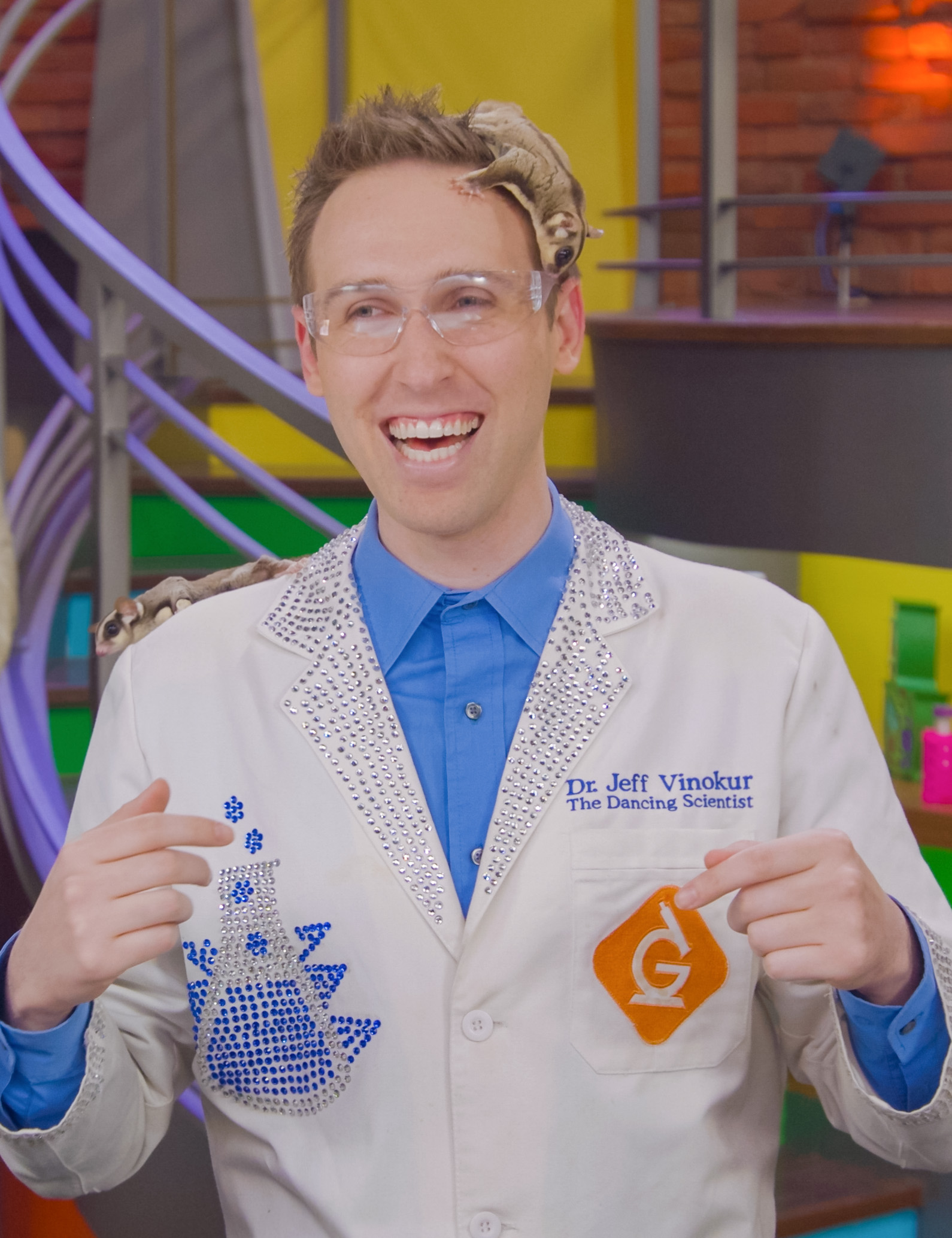
- Vinokur hosting a science show (2019)
- Born: August 24, 1990 (age 36); Montvale, New Jersey
- Other names: Dr. Jeff, The Dancing Scientist
- Education: PhD, Biochemistry (UCLA)
- Occupations: scientist, entrepreneur
- Years active: 2010-present
- Known for: science demonstrations, hosting
- Scientific career
- Fields: Biochemistry
- Thesis: Discovery of a novel mevalonate pathway and its potential to produce biofuels.
- Website: www.DancingScientist.com

Jeffrey Vinokur (born August 24, 1990), also known as Dr. Jeff and The Dancing Scientist, is an American scientist, entrepreneur and Emmy-nominated host of more than 100 educational science shows for children.

He is also the founder & CEO of Generation Genius, an educational streaming platform used in approximately 30% of elementary schools in the United States as of Nov 2021. Generation Genius ranked as the #88 fastest growing company in America on the Inc500 list in 2022 and was featured on TIME Magazine’s TIME100 list of most influential companies in 2023. In 2025, Generation Genius was acquired by Newsela for $100 million.

Vinokur has performed as “The Dancing Scientist” on national TV shows including Good Morning America, The Today Show, The View, America's Got Talent, and Discovery Channel, as well as live stage shows at the World Science Festival, Smithsonian Institution, and the USA Science and Engineering Festival.

== Early life ==
Jeffrey Vinokur was born in 1990 to Russian immigrant parents. He attended Montvale Public Schools. His early interest in science was fueled by doing kitchen science experiments in elementary school, which later progressed to creating a chemistry lab in his parents' garage at age 14, where he would do amateur experiments like making sodium metal from household supplies. Vinokur began conducting biochemistry research at age 15 at Rutgers University.

While a senior at Pascack Hills High School, he began learning the dance genre of "popping" through online videos and DVDs. He later traveled to New York City to take classes from leading practitioners of the dance style such as Jazzy J of The Electric Boogaloos. Afterwards he began posting dance tutorials on YouTube under the username "TheRussianTiger," and the videos have since garnered millions of hits.

Vinokur first combined science and dance into a performance while attending the University of Wisconsin–Madison as a biochemistry major. He received guidance from UW-Madison chemistry professor Bassam Shakhashiri, UW-Madison physics professor Clint Sprott, and lecture demonstrator Jim Maynard. The performance was later premiered on America's Got Talent in 2010.

== Career ==
=== TV & Media Appearances ===
Vinokur premiered as "The Dancing Scientist" on the fifth season of America's Got Talent where he successfully placed in the Top 100 acts out of 70,000 auditions. The America’s Got Talent appearance lead to Vinokur hosting a monthly science segment on the local news in Madison, Wisconsin beginning in 2011. These local news appearances eventually lead to him appearing on the Discovery Channel (Canada) show Daily Planet in 2012.

Since 2014, Vinokur has been performing science demonstrations on national TV talk shows, with appearances on Good Morning America, The Today Show, The View, Rachael Ray, The Queen Latifah Show, Fox & Friends, Home & Family, AMHQ With Sam Champion, and internationally on "Nippon-yo! Sekai-wo Taose! FUJIYAMA," a show on Fuji TV in Japan.

In 2020, Vinokur appeared in a Super Bowl commercial for TurboTax.

In 2023, Vinokur was nominated for a national Emmy award as part of the Children's and Family Emmy Awards. The category was “Outstanding Interactive Media” and the awards were presented by the National Academy of Television Arts and Sciences.

=== Live Shows ===
Vinokur’s live stage shows have been performed at the World Science Festival, Liberty Science Center, Maryland Science Center, Saint Louis Science Center, USA Science and Engineering Festival, Caltech, Singapore Science Festival, Smithsonian Institution, and over 400 schools nationwide.

=== Generation Genius ===
In 2017, Vinokur founded and became CEO of Generation Genius, Inc. The educational technology company produces educational videos in partnership with the National Science Teaching Association.

Generation Genius raised $2.7 million in seed funding which included contributions from the Howard Hughes Medical Institute and over $1 million raised from equity crowdfunding.

Vinokur hosts three original series on the platform, consisting of over 100 episodes, covering science topics taught in grades K-8 science.

As of Nov 2021, Generation Genius videos, hosted by Dr. Jeff, are used by 3 million students each week with subscriptions in more than 30% of all elementary schools in the United States.

In 2022, Generation Genius ranked #88 fastest growing company in America on the Inc500 list and in 2023 appeared on Time Magazine’s TIME100 list of most influential companies in 2023.

In 2025, Generation Genius was acquired by Newsela for $100 million.

=== Scientific Research ===
Vinokur received a PhD in "Biochemistry, Molecular and Structural Biology" from UCLA in 2017. During his graduate studies, he published research on the discovery of new enzymes in ancient bacteria that grow in some of the most extreme conditions on Earth.

His publications investigate how some enzymes are able to work in harsh conditions and how they can potentially be modified to produce biofuels. Vinokur is a recipient of the NSF Graduate Research Fellowship and NIH-UCLA Chemistry Biology Interface Fellowship.

== Personal life ==
In a 2020 interview, Vinokur stated that he almost never uses personal social media despite having a career working in media. He states, "I'm not active on a personal level on social media... I don't want to be spending time thinking of interesting things to say and taking pictures of my food... I just want to eat quick and get back to growing Generation Genius to reach as many kids as possible."

== See also ==
- Popping
- Clint Sprott
- Bill Nye
- Mr. Wizard
