= Jeanne Chall =

American educator and psychological (1921–1999)

Jeanne Sternlicht Chall
- Born: January 1, 1921; Poland
- Died: November 27, 1999; Cambridge, Massachusetts, United States
- Education: City College of New York (BBA); Ohio State University (MA, PhD)
- Occupations: Educational psychologist, writer, literacy researcher
- Years active: 1940s–1991

Jeanne Sternlicht Chall (January 1, 1921 – November 27, 1999), a Harvard Graduate School of Education psychologist, writer, and literacy researcher for over 50 years, believed in the importance of direct, systematic instruction in reading in spite of other reading trends throughout her career.

Chall became deeply committed to teaching, to the importance of children's successful reading acquisition and the need to address failing readers, to the power of research to answer practical questions, and to the merit of understanding the historical background of research questions. Though her views were often controversial, she was respected by her peers for the meticulous research. Her conclusions about the best way to approach beginning reading were unpopular when she first presented them, though they have subsequently gained acceptance in the literacy community. Chall's professional life was committed to children's successful reading acquisition, especially low S.E.S. (socioeconomic status) children's. She was also committed to finding answers to failure among readers. She responded to the national concern over why many children were not learning to read well, made popular by Rudolf Flesch's Why Johnny Can't Read, by writing Learning to Read: The Great Debate. She and Edgar Dale also developed a formula, the Dale-Chall Readability Formula, in 1948 which was considered the most valid and reliable of its kind for determining the readability of texts for several decades. In 1983, Chall added Stages of Reading Development to her literacy contributions. Later, in 1996, she and three of her graduate students developed the Qualitative Assessment of Text Difficulty: A Practical Guide for Teachers and Writers.

Chall retired from the Harvard Graduate School of Education in 1991. She died at 78 in Cambridge, Massachusetts on November 27, 1999.

== Biographical information ==
Born in Poland in 1921 to Jewish parents, her family immigrated to New York City when she was seven; Chall's native language was Yiddish. Although there were no bilingual programs in the New York City public schools she attended, she quickly learned English. Unlike her older siblings, Chall began her schooling in the US and ultimately helped to teach her parents English so that they could pass their citizenship exams. She graduated from the City College of New York in 1941 with a B.B.A. She served as research assistant to Edgar Dale at Ohio State University, where she received a M.A. in 1947 and a Ph.D. in 1952. Between 1950 and 1965 Chall rose from lecturer to professor at City College. Later she became the director of the Harvard Reading Laboratory at Harvard University. Chall died in 1999 at the age of 78. The Between the Lions episode "The Fox and the Crow" was dedicated to her memory.

== Major contributions ==
In 1965 Chall moved to Harvard University to create and direct graduate programs in reading for master's and doctoral candidates. She founded the Harvard Reading Laboratory in 1967, directing it until she retired in 1991. The laboratory is now named after her. She served on the board of directors of the International Reading Association, 1961–1964, and on the National Academy of Education's Commission on Reading that resulted in the report Becoming a Nation of Readers (1985). She received many professional awards, last given to her in 1996.

Chall's most important professional contribution was a byproduct of the professional furor over Rudolf Flesch's Why Johnny Can't Read—And What You Can Do About It (1955). Flesch attacked the prevailing ideas, saying that reading professionals had ignored their own research.

Chall's Learning to Read the Great Debate (1967) quickly became a classic. Major textbook publishers reacted by emphasizing more phonics earlier in their series. Chall's book was updated in 1983 (3rd edition in 1996) with even stronger research findings to support its conclusions.

Stages of Reading Development was published in 1983. In 1996, Chall and three graduate students wrote a guide to evaluating the level of texts' reading difficulty, Qualitative Assessment of Text Difficulty: A Practical Guide for Teachers and Writers.

Chall's last work, published posthumously, was The Academic Challenge: What Really Works in the Classroom (2000). In it, she divides American instruction into "child-centered" and "teacher-centered" approaches, suggesting that the 20th century was dominated by the former (discovery approaches) in spite of the research that supported a later theory (explicit teaching).

== Professional leadership positions ==
- Fellow in American Psychological Association
- Fellow of the American Association for the Advancement of Science
- President of National Conference on Research in English
- Board Member of International Reading Association's Board of Directors
- Board Member of National Society for the Study of Education's Board of Directors
- Served on National Advisory Committee on Dyslexia and Related Reading Disorders
- Served on the National Reading Council

== Notes ==
Chall, J.S. (1958). Readability: An appraisal of research and application. Columbus, OH: The Bureau of Educational Research, Ohio State University.

Chall, J.S. & Feldman, S.C. (1966). A study in depth of first grade reading: An analysis of the interactions of professed methods, teacher implementation and child background. U.S. Office of Education U.S. Department of Health, Education and Welfare.

Chall, J.S. & Conrad, S.S (1991). Should textbooks challenge students? The case for easier or harder books. New York: Teachers College Press.

Chall, J.S., Bissex, G.L., Conrad, S.S., & Harris-Sharples, S. (1996). Qualitative assessment of text difficulty: A practical guide for teachers and writers. Cambridge: Brookline Books.
