= Linsear Write =

Tool used to measure readability of English texts

Linsear Write is a readability metric for English text, purportedly developed for the United States Air Force to help them calculate the readability of their technical manuals. It is one of many such readability metrics, but is specifically designed to calculate the United States grade level of a text sample based on sentence length and the number of words used that have three or more syllables. It is similar to the Fry readability formula.

== Algorithm ==
The standard Linsear Write metric Lw runs on a 100-word sample:

1. For each "easy word", defined as words with 2 syllables or less, add 1 point.
2. For each "hard word", defined as words with 3 syllables or more, add 3 points.
3. Divide the points by the number of sentences in the 100-word sample.
4. Adjust the provisional result r:
  - If r > 20, Lw = r / 2.
  - If r ≤ 20, Lw = r / 2 - 1.

The result is a "grade level" measure, reflecting the estimated years of education needed to read the text fluently.

== History ==
The idea behind the metric goes back to government employee John O'Hayre's 1966 manual, titled Gobbledygook Has Gotta Go. In his style manual, O'Hayre proposed a metric that considers shorter sentences and shorter words easier to read: in a 100-word sample, each one-syllable word (with the exception of some stop words) is worth one point, and each sentence (semicolon or period) is worth 3 points. The higher the score, the better. At some later point in time the metric was developed into a full Linsear Write Index.
