= Spache readability formula =

Readability test for writing in English, notably texts for children up to fourth grade

The Spache readability formula is a readability test for writing in English, designed by George Spache. It works best on texts that are for children up to fourth grade. For older children, the Dale–Chall readability formula is more appropriate.

It was introduced in 1953 in Spache's "A new readability formula for primary-grade reading materials," (The Elementary School Journal, 53, 410–413), and has subsequently been revised.

== Calculation ==
The method compares words in a text to a set list of everyday words. The number of words per sentence and the percentage of unfamiliar words determine the reading age.

The original formula was:

$$\mbox{Grade Level} = \left ( 0.141 \times \mbox{Average sentence length} \right ) + \left ( 0.086 \times \mbox{Percentage of unique unfamiliar words} \right) + 0.839$$

The revised formula is:

$$\mbox{Grade Level} = \left ( 0.121 \times \mbox{Average sentence length} \right ) + \left ( 0.082 \times \mbox{Percentage of unique unfamiliar words} \right) + 0.659$$
