= J. Peter Kincaid =

American scientist

J. Peter Kincaid (September 16, 1942 – October 16, 2026) was a scientist and educator who was the founding director of the Modeling and Simulation Ph.D. program at the University of Central Florida. Trained as a human factors psychologist at the Ohio State University, Kincaid split his career between higher education and working as a scientist for the U.S. military. He developed the Flesch-Kincaid Readability Test for the U.S. Navy. As of 2022, multiple United States' governmental departments utilize the Flesch-Kincaid Test within their standardized operating processes.

== Education ==
He received degrees in psychology and human factors.

- Oberlin College (BA 1964)
- Ohio State University (PhD 1971)

== Flesch-Kincaid Readability Test Summary ==
With the help of Robert Flesch, Kincaid developed a model that measures the required reading level of an American student based on sentence and word choice. Before this method was developed, a combination of models was used to determine the reading level based on the percentage of "big" words, meaning words with three syllables or more, in 30 sentences, and for paragraphs with less than 30 sentences, the word "fog" was used to determine the reading level.
