= Chris Callison-Burch =

American computer scientist (May 1977)

- Born: May 1977 (age 49); United States
- Citizenship: American
- Education: Stanford University (BS); University of Edinburgh (PhD)
- Known for: Machine translation, Paraphrase generation, Large language models
- Awards: Google Faculty Research Award; Sloan Research Fellowship (2014)
- Scientific career
- Fields: Natural language processing, Artificial intelligence, Crowdsourcing
- Workplaces: University of Pennsylvania, Johns Hopkins University, Allen Institute for AI
- Thesis: Paraphrasing and Translation (2003)
- Doctoral advisor: Miles Osborne and Mark Steedman
- Website: https://www.cis.upenn.edu/~ccb/

Chris Callison-Burch is an American computer scientist and professor of computer and information science at the University of Pennsylvania (Penn), specializing in natural language processing (NLP), artificial intelligence (AI), and crowdsourcing. He is recognised for his contributions to machine translation, paraphrase generation, and the application of large language models (LLMs) to AI challenges, with over 200 publications cited more than 33,000 times. Callison-Burch has influenced public policy on AI and copyright, testifying before the U.S. Congress in 2023 on generative AI’s implications. He serves as the faculty director for Penn’s Online Master of Science in Engineering in AI program.

== Education ==
Callison-Burch earned his PhD in Computer Science from the University of Edinburgh in 2008, focusing on machine translation and paraphrasing techniques. His doctoral research developed statistical methods for generating paraphrases in machine translation systems, laying the foundation for his later NLP work. Prior to his PhD, he studied at Stanford University, where he developed an interest in computational linguistics.

== Career ==
After his PhD, Callison-Burch joined the Centre for Language and Speech Processing at Johns Hopkins University as a research faculty member from 2008 to 2013, working on NLP projects, including machine translation and crowdsourcing for creating training data. In 2013, he joined the University of Pennsylvania as an assistant professor in the Department of Computer and Information Science and was promoted to associate professor in 2017, and to full professor in 2024.

At Penn, Callison-Burch teaches courses on AI and NLP, including CIS 5300 (Natural Language Processing) and CIS 5210 (Artificial Intelligence), which attract over 500 students annually. He directs Penn’s Online Master of Science in Engineering in AI program, launched in 2025. He teaches AI and NLP courses on Coursera, reaching thousands of global learners.

Callison-Burch was a part-time visiting researcher at Google in 2019 and 2020, where he collaborated on applying Google's LLM to Dungeons & Dragons dialogues. In 2023, he took a sabbatical at the Allen Institute for AI (AI2), where he contributed to vision-language models.

== Research ==
Callison-Burch’s research focuses on NLP, AI, and crowdsourcing, with significant contributions to machine translation, paraphrase generation, and LLMs for tasks like text simplification and bias detection. His early work developed crowdsourcing methods for machine translation, leveraging non-expert annotators for paraphrase-based evaluation, influencing platforms like Amazon Mechanical Turk.

Recent projects have included several notable works. Molmo and PixMo (2025) are open-weight vision-language models developed with AI2, achieving state-of-the-art multimodal performance and earning a Best Paper Honourable Mention at CVPR 2025. Also in 2025, his work on Calibrating Large Language Models with Sample Consistency improves LLM reliability via sample-based calibration, presented at NAACL 2025. The Media Bias Detector (2025) is a real-time tool analysing selection and framing bias in news, using LLMs to detect persuasive language differences (e.g., Russian vs. English Wikipedia). Holodeck (2024) is a language-guided system for generating 3D embodied AI environments, presented at CVPR 2024. BORDIRLINES (2024) is a dataset for cross-lingual retrieval-augmented generation, focusing on culturally sensitive tasks.

He has co-authored over 200 publications, featured at conferences like ACL, EMNLP, and CVPR.

== Awards and recognition ==
Callison-Burch has received numerous awards:

- Best Paper Honourable Mention at CVPR 2025 for "Molmo and PixMo".
- Best Paper Award at the Workshop on Cognitive Modelling and Computational Linguistics (CMCL) 2024 for "Evaluating Vision-Language Models on Bistable Images".
- Best Paper Award at STARSEM 2016 for "So-Called Non-Subsective Adjectives".
- Best Paper Award at the Workshop on Sense, Concept and Entity Representations 2017 for "Word Sense Filtering Improves Embedding-Based Lexical Substitution".
- Honourable Mention Award at CHI 2018 for "A Data-Driven Analysis of Workers’ Earnings on Amazon Mechanical Turk".
- Google Faculty Research Award (2013) for crowdsourcing in NLP.
- Sloan Research Fellowship (2014).

He has received research funding from Google, Microsoft, Amazon, Facebook, Roblox, DARPA, IARPA, and NSF. His h-index is 72, with over 33,000 citations. He served as General Chair of ACL 2017 and as the Program Co-Chair EMNLP 2015.

== Public policy and testimony ==
On May 17, 2023, Callison-Burch testified before the U.S. House Subcommittee on Courts, Intellectual Property, and the Internet on AI and copyright law. His testimony emphasised generative AI’s role in creative industries and the need for balanced copyright frameworks. He has appeared on Fox News to discuss AI’s societal impact, and discussed its impact with other print news sources.

He contributes to AI ethics discussions, including workshops on AI’s effects on writing and creative professions.

== See also ==
- Natural language processing
- Artificial intelligence
- Machine translation
- University of Pennsylvania
