= Learning pyramid =

Concept in education

The learning pyramid (also known as “the cone of learning”, “the learning cone”, “the cone of retention”, “the pyramid of learning”, or “the pyramid of retention”) is a pseudoscientific group of effective learning models and representations relating different degrees of retention induced from various types of learning.

== Description ==
The earliest such representation is believed to originate in a 1954 book called Audio-Visual Methods in Teaching. A pyramid model was supposedly developed by the National Training Laboratories Institute in the early 1960s, on its main campus in Bethel, Maine, for which the original, internal research is said to have been lost. Despite this, NTL's learning pyramid model became a central representation of this concept with a large number of models drawing from it. NTL's model generally used the following divisions:

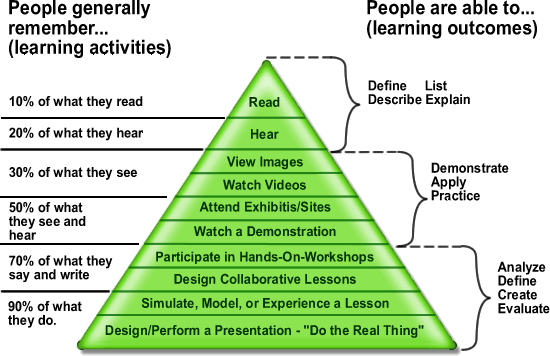
Learning Pyramid or Cone of Learning

Retention rate	Learning activity before test of knowledge
90%	Teach someone else/use immediately.
75%	Practice what one learned.
50%	Engage in a group discussion.
30%	Watch a demonstration.
20%	Watch audiovisual.
10%	Read.
5%	Listen to a lecture.

== Criticisms ==
Criticism emerged on early versions of the model such as Edgar Dale's Cone of Experience. Critics reported inconsistencies between the pyramid of learning and research. The NTL learning pyramid study being lost, the field largely stands on an unknown methodology of unknown quality, with unknown mitigation of influential parameters such as time, population tested, etc., making the original study's results untrustworthy.

== See also ==
- Educational aims and objectives
