= SMOG =

Measure of readability

The SMOG grade is a measure of readability that estimates the years of education needed to understand a piece of writing. SMOG is an acronym for "Simple Measure of Gobbledygook".

SMOG is widely used, particularly for checking health messages. The SMOG grade yields a 0.985 correlation with a standard error of 1.5159 grades with the grades of readers who had 100% comprehension of test materials.

The formula for calculating the SMOG grade was developed by G. Harry McLaughlin as a more accurate and more easily calculated substitute for the Gunning fog index and published in 1969. To make calculating a text's readability as simple as possible an approximate formula was also given — count the words of three or more syllables in three 10-sentence samples, estimate the count's square root (from the nearest perfect square), and add 3.

A 2010 study published in the Journal of the Royal College of Physicians of Edinburgh stated that “SMOG should be the preferred measure of readability when evaluating consumer-oriented healthcare material.” The study found that “The Flesch-Kincaid formula significantly underestimated reading difficulty compared with the gold standard SMOG formula.”

Applying SMOG to other languages lacks statistical validity.

== Formulae ==
To calculate SMOG Index

1. Take three ten-sentence-long samples from the text in question.
2. In those sentences, count the polysyllables (words of 3 or more syllables).
3. Calculate using
  $$\mbox{grade} = 1.0430 \sqrt{\mbox{number of polysyllables}\times{30 \over \mbox{number of sentences}} } + 3.1291$$

This version (sometimes called the SMOG Index) is more easily used for mental math:

1. Count the number of polysyllabic words in three samples of ten sentences each.
2. Take the square root of the nearest perfect square
3. Add 3

SMOG conversion tables compiled by Harold C. McGraw are slightly inaccurate because they are based on the approximate formula. Furthermore, tables for texts of fewer than 30 sentences are statistically invalid, because the formula was normed on 30-sentence samples.
