= Nikolai Rubakin =

Russian bibliographer and librarian

- Николай Рубакин
- Nikolai Rubakin in 1912
- Born: 13 July 1862; Oranienbaum, St. Petersburg, Russian Empire
- Died: 23 November 1946 (aged 84); Lausanne, Switzerland
- Education: Imperial Saint Petersburg University
- Occupations: Bibliographer, librarian, essayist, educator, writer

Nikolai Aleksandrovich Rubakin (Russian: Николай Александрович Рубакин; 13 July 1862 – 23 November 1946) was a Russian bibliographer, populariser of science, librarian and writer.

== Biography ==
Nikolai Rubakin was born in to the family of a timber merchant. After finishing his secondary education, he was enrolled at the Imperial St. Petersburg University. During his studies he became friends with Alexander Ulyanov (Vladimir Lenin's older brother).

While still a student, Rubakin became interested in becoming an educator. Upon completing his studies, he consciously devoted himself to publishing and library work in the spirit of the populist "going to the people" movement. However, immediately after graduating from university, he was arrested and placed under police surveillance. Having shown continued indifference to both an academic and administrative career, Rubakin opened his own public library and personally selected textbooks and progressive publications, received and stored illegal literature.

He began studying the needs of Russian readers and wrote numerous essays. Rubakin's scholarly research was seen as dangerous to Tsarist police therefore he was exiled to Ryazan, and in 1901, after the writers of St. Petersburg protested against the beating of a student demonstration, Rubakin was exiled to Crimea. In Crimea, Rubakin joined the Socialist Revolutionary Party. He was transferred to Novgorod, and from there in 1904, by order of the Minister of Internal Affairs Plehve, he was “permanently” exiled abroad, but after the assassination of the minister the following year he received permission to return. After the failure of the 1905 Russian Revolution, Rubakin was exiled abroad to Switzerland and in 1908 he left the SRs following the Azef affair.

In Switzerland, he opened a Russian-language public library, which was constantly replenished with books published in Russia. From 1923 to 1928, 23 of Rubakin's books were republished in the USSR. In addition, several of his books on natural science, published abroad with a circulation of almost 50,000 copies, were imported. He donated the first collected library to the St. Petersburg Education League in 1907, and bequeathed the second (nearly 100,000 volumes) to the V. I. Lenin State Library in Moscow.

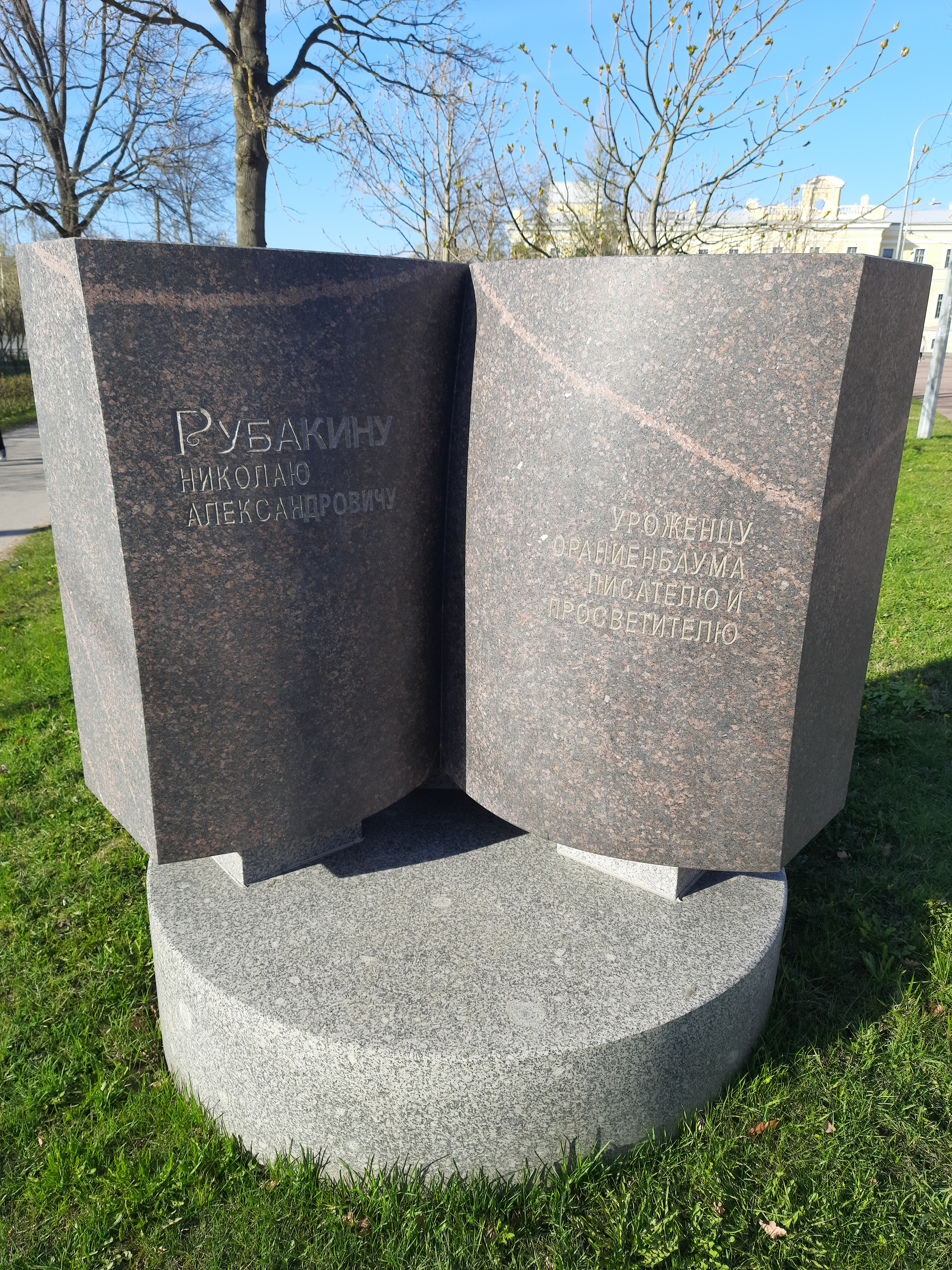
Memorial to Nikolai Rubakin in Lomonosov

During the Second World War he helped Soviet prisoners who managed to escape to Switzerland. He died in 1946 in Lausanne, was cremated and, according to his will, was buried in Moscow at the Novodevichy Cemetery.
