= Why Johnny Can't Read =

1955 nonfiction book by Rudolf Flesch

- Title page for Why Johnny Can't Read—And What You Can Do About It (1955)
- Author: Rudolf Flesch
- Subject: Literacy, American education
- Publisher: Harper and Brothers
- Publication date: 1955
- Pages: 222

Why Johnny Can't Read—And What You Can Do About It is a 1955 book-length exposé of American reading education by Rudolf Flesch. It was an immediate bestseller for 37 weeks and became an educational cause célèbre. In the book, the author concluded that the "look-say" method (memorization of whole words by sight) was ineffective because it lacked proper phonics training. Additionally, Flesch was critical of the simple stories and limited text and vocabulary of the Dick and Jane style readers that taught students to read by memorization of words. Flesch also believed that the look-say method did not properly prepare students to read more complex materials in later grade levels. There was thereafter multiple spin off for other languages or contexts.

The book presaged the reading wars between phonics-based instruction (based on the science of reading) and whole language/balanced literacy that would arise later in the 20th century and continue well into the 21st.

== See also ==
- Basal reader
- Dumbing Us Down
- Phonics
- Primer (textbook)
- Reading
- Science of reading
- Sold a Story
- The Cat in the Hat
- Three cueing
- Why Johnny Can't Add

== Bibliography ==
- Hall, Robert A. (1956). "Review of Why Johnny Can't Read—And What You Can Do about It". Language. 32 (2): 310–313. doi:10.2307/411011. ISSN 0097-8507. JSTOR 411011.
