= Clint Sprott =

American physicist

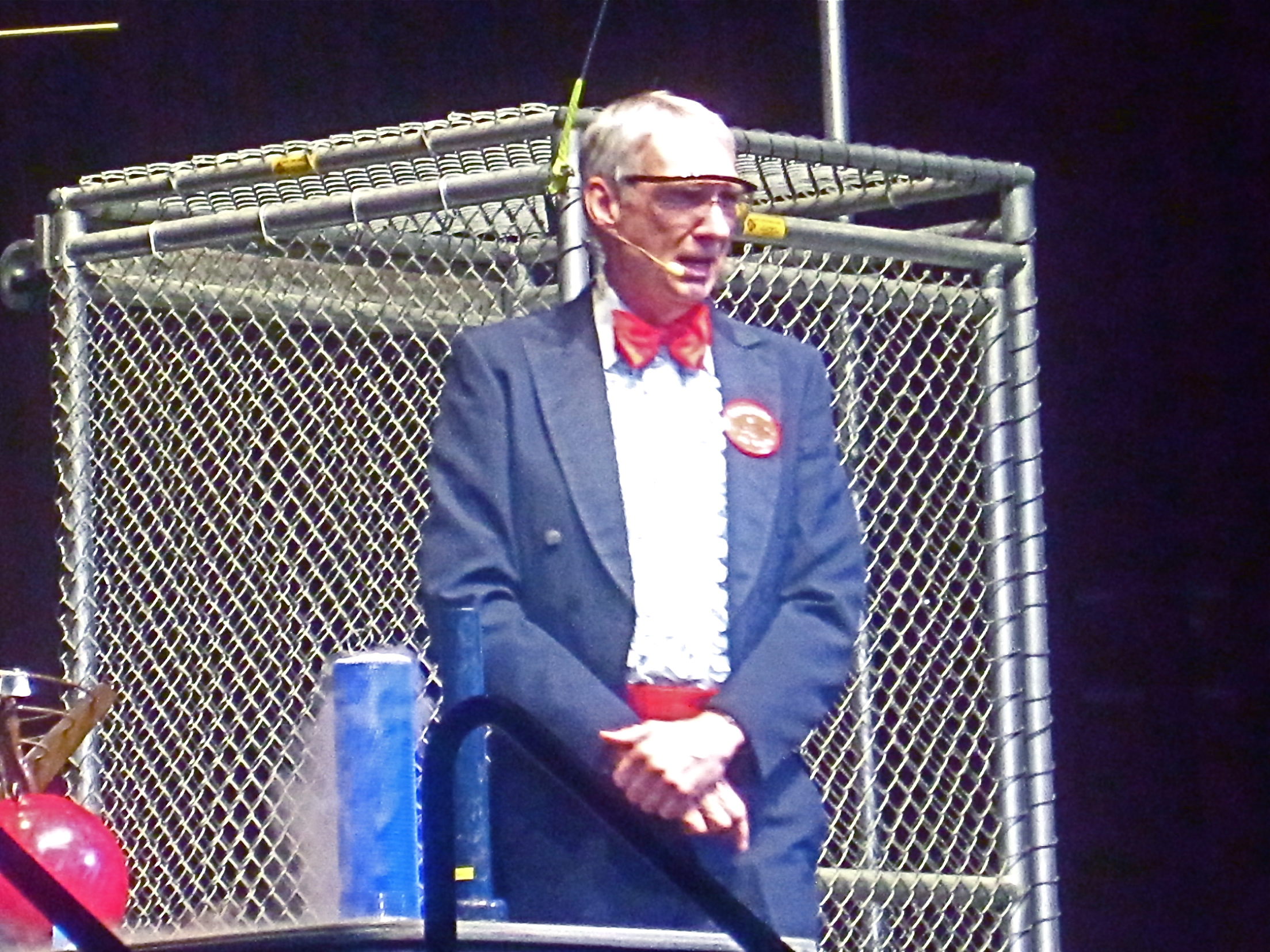
- Sprott presenting his show, "The Wonders of Physics", at the 2011 National Science Olympiad in Madison, Wisconsin
- Born: Julien Clinton Sprott; September 16, 1942 (age 84); Memphis, Tennessee, U.S.
- Education: MIT (B.S.); University of Wisconsin–Madison (M.S., Ph.D.)
- Scientific career
- Fields: Plasma physics, chaos theory
- Workplaces: University of Wisconsin–Madison

Julien Clinton Sprott (born 16 September 1942) is an emeritus professor of physics at the University of Wisconsin–Madison.

== Biography ==
Julien Clinton Sprott was born on 16 September 1942 in Memphis, Tennessee. He graduated from Central High School. He earned his bachelor's degree from MIT in 1964. He received his master's and Ph.D. in physics from the University of Wisconsin–Madison in 1966 and 1969, respectively. His professional interests are in experimental plasma physics and chaos theory.

In 1984, the University of Wisconsin–Madison began a program called The Wonders of Physics, which Sprott presented in a typical travelling showman style to audiences of all ages. The show has been presented on the Madison campus over 300 times to a total audience of over 100,000 over a period of 40 years. His shows are available freely as streaming video from his website.

He is author of several fundamental books on chaos, among which Chaos and Time-Series Analysis and Elegant Chaos.
