= Edgar Dale =

American educator (1900–1985)

- Born: April 27, 1900; Benson, Minnesota
- Died: March 8, 1985 (aged 84); Columbus, Ohio
- Occupation: educator
- Notable work: Learning Pyramid

Edgar Dale (April 27, 1900, in Benson, Minnesota, – March 8, 1985, in Columbus, Ohio) was an American educator who developed the Cone of Experience, also known as the Learning Pyramid. He made several contributions to audio and visual instruction, including a methodology for analyzing the content of motion pictures.

== Early career ==
Edgar Dale was born on April 27, 1900, in Benson, Minnesota. He received a B.A. and M.A. from the University of North Dakota and a Ph.D from the University of Chicago. His doctoral thesis was titled "Factual Basis for Curriculum Revision in Arithmetic with Special Reference to Children's Understanding of Business Terms." and is precursor for his later work with vocabulary and readability.

From 1921 to 1924, Dale was a teacher and the superintendent of schools in Webster, North Dakota. In 1924, he became a teacher at junior high school in Winnetka, Illinois, where he stayed until 1926. In 1928, Dale's interest in film led to a position with Eastman Kodak as a member of the editorial staff of Eastman Teaching Films in Rochester, New York, for one year.

In 1929, Dale left Kodak to become a professor at Ohio State University. Dale remained a professor at OSU until his retirement in 1970.

In 1933, Dale wrote a paper on how to effectively create a high school film appreciation class. This paper has been noted for having a very different view of adolescent interaction with films than that taken by the Film Control Boards of the time.

Dale died March 8, 1985, in Columbus, Ohio.

== Cone of Experience ==
In 1946, Dale introduced the Cone of Experience concept in a textbook on audiovisual methods in teaching. He revised it for a second printing in 1954 and again in 1969.

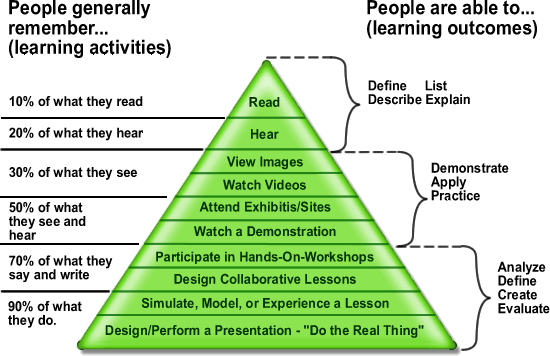
An example of the false "cone of learning" attributed to Dale

Dale's "Cone of Experience," which he intended to provide an intuitive model of the concreteness of various kinds of audiovisual media, has been widely misrepresented. Often referred to as the "Cone of Learning," it purports to inform viewers of how much people remember based on how they encounter information.

However, Dale included no numbers and did not base his cone on scientific research, and he also warned readers not to take the cone too seriously. The numbers originated from 1967, when a Mobil employee, D.G. Treichler, published a non-scholarly article in Film and Audio-Visual Communications.

== Awards ==
- Educational Film Library Association Award (1961)
- Eastman Kodak Gold Medal Award (1968)
- Distinguished Services Award (1972)
- National Reading Hall of Fame (1972)
