= Gunning fog index =

Readability test for English writing

In linguistics, the Gunning fog index is a readability test for English writing. The index estimates the years of formal education a person needs to understand the text on the first reading. For instance, a fog index of 12 requires the reading level of a United States high school senior (around 18 years old). The test was developed in 1952 by Robert Gunning, an American businessman who had been involved in newspaper and textbook publishing.

The fog index is commonly used to confirm that text can be read easily by the intended audience. Texts for a wide audience generally need a fog index less than 12. Texts requiring near-universal understanding generally need an index less than 8.

Fog Index	Reading level by grade
17	College graduate
16	College senior
15	College junior
14	College sophomore
13	College freshman
12	High school senior
11	High school junior
10	High school sophomore
9	High school freshman
8	Eighth grade
7	Seventh grade
6	Sixth grade

== Calculation ==
The Gunning fog index is calculated with the following algorithm:

1. Select a passage (such as one or more full paragraphs) of around 100 words. Do not omit any sentences;
2. Determine the average sentence length. (Divide the number of words by the number of sentences.);
3. Count the "complex" words consisting of three or more syllables. Do not include proper nouns, familiar jargon, or compound words. Do not include common suffixes (such as -es, -ed, or -ing) as a syllable;
4. Add the average sentence length and the percentage of complex words; and
5. Multiply the result by 0.4.

The complete formula is:

$$0.4\left[ \left(\frac{\mbox{words}}{\mbox{sentences}}\right) + 100\left(\frac{\mbox{complex words}}{\mbox{words}}\right) \right]$$

== Limitations ==
A high fog index is a good measure of hard-to-read text, but it has its limits. Not all complex words are difficult to understand. For example, "interesting" is not generally thought to be a difficult word, although it has three syllables (excluding the common -ing suffix). On the other hand, short words can still be difficult if they are not often used. The frequency of word usage also affects the readability of a text. Additionally, the fog index is primarily applicable to English and may not accurately reflect readability in other languages.

Until the 1980s, the fog index was calculated differently. The original formula counted each clause as a sentence. Because the index was meant to measure clarity of expression within sentences, it assumed people saw each clause as a complete thought.

In the 1980s, the calculation method changed. From this point onward, the clause counting step was left out in counting the fog index for literature. This might have been because it had to be done manually. Judith Bogert of Pennsylvania State University defended the original algorithm in 1985. However, a review of subsequent literature generally recommends the newer method.

Nevertheless, some argue that a series of simple, short sentences does not mean that the reading is easier. For example, in Gibbon's The History of the Decline and Fall of the Roman Empire, the fog scores using the old and revised algorithms differ greatly. A sample test using an automated Gunning Fog calculator on a random footnote from the text (#51: Dion, vol. I. lxxix. p. 1363. Herodian, l. v. p. 189.) gave an index of 19.2 using only the sentence count, and an index of 12.5 when including independent clauses. This brought down the fog index from post-graduate to high school level.

== See also ==
- Flesch–Kincaid readability tests
- Plain language
- Readability
