= Fry readability formula =

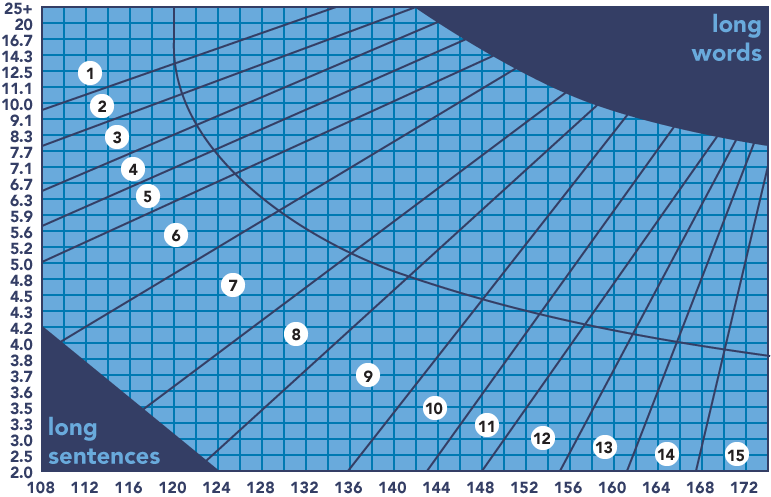
A rendition of the Fry graph.

The Fry readability formula (or Fry readability graph) is a readability metric for English texts, developed by Edward Fry.

The grade reading level (or reading difficulty level) is calculated by the average number of sentences (y-axis) and syllables (x-axis) per hundred words. These averages are plotted onto a specific graph; the intersection of the average number of sentences and the average number of syllables determines the reading level of the content.

The formula and graph are often used to provide a common standard by which the readability of documents can be measured. It is sometimes used for regulatory purposes, such as in healthcare, to ensure publications have a level of readability that is understandable and accessible by a wider portion of the population.
