= Newsela =

Educational website

- Company type: Private
- Website type: Educational website
- Available in: English
- Headquarters: New York City, New York, U.S.
- Creator: Matthew Gross
- Editor: Jennifer Coogan
- Website: Newsela.com
- Launched: 2013
- Current status: Active

Newsela is a literacy educational technology company founded by Matthew Gross. Newsela news content is free with a registered account and additional resources are available by subscription.

== Background ==
=== History ===
While former teacher Matthew Gross was working on the Common Core standards roll out in New York, he was disappointed to discover outdated textbooks that were labeled "Common Core-Aligned". One of Gross's children struggled with reading. After meeting with his son's assistant principal, he felt like she had given up on his son. Gross decided to start Newsela in 2013 for his son and to make a larger impact in education.

=== Partnerships ===
Newsela's partnership with The Virginia School Consortium for Learning (VaSCL) enables members to access Newsela at a discounted rate, as of December 2020.

In response to the COVID-19 pandemic, Newsela announced a partnership with NWEA to help teachers differentiate instruction. After a student takes a MAP Growth assessment, Newsela will automatically show teachers content at that student's reading level.

BrainPop and Newsela formed a partnership on October 10, 2017. Users can access Newsela's resources directly from BrainPop's topic pages.

Newsela editor-in-chief Jennifer Coogan partnered with the American Press Institute to help combat fake news websites in the United States in October 2016.

== Features ==
Newsela offers news articles that can be customized to match a student's reading level. Newsela's texts come from publishers including the Associated Press and Encyclopedia Britannica. The company offers supplemental instructional materials, including assessments, lessons and professional development. English language arts (ELA), Social Studies, Science and Social and Emotional Learning (SEL) content are available in English and Spanish.

Due to concerns about mature content, Newsela has created Newsela Elementary, with articles targeted toward elementary school students. Newsela also created Newsela PRO, a paid upgrade for teachers to use more features.
