= Rudolf Flesch =

Austrian-American author (1911–1986)

- Born: 8 May 1911; Vienna, Austria
- Died: 5 October 1986 (aged 75); New York City, New York, U.S.
- Known for: Flesch–Kincaid readability tests

Academic background
- Education: University of Vienna; Columbia University (PhD)

Academic work
- Notable works: Why Johnny Can't Read

Rudolf Franz Flesch (8 May 1911 – 5 October 1986) was an Austrian-born naturalized American author (noted for his book Why Johnny Can't Read), and also a readability expert and writing consultant who was a vigorous proponent of plain English in the United States. He created the Flesch Reading Ease test and was co-creator of the Flesch–Kincaid readability tests. Flesch advocated use of phonics rather than sight reading to enable students to sound-out unfamiliar words.

== Personal life ==
Flesch was an Austrian born in Vienna. He earned a doctorate in law from the University of Vienna in 1933. He fled to the United States to avoid the imminent Nazi invasion and antisemitism. In the United States, Flesch became a graduate student at Columbia University, where he earned a PhD in Library Science. He also met Elizabeth Terpenning, whom he married. They had six children, five daughters and one son. Flesch lived for most of his life with his wife and children in Dobbs Ferry, New York, a village in southern Westchester county.

== Career ==
Not long after finishing his graduate degree, in 1955 he published what became his most famous book, Why Johnny Can't Read: And What You Can Do About It. The book was a critique of the then-trendy practice of teaching reading by sight, often termed the "look-say" method. The flaw of this method, according to Flesch, was that it required simple memorization of the entire word, so that when confronted with an unknown word, the learner became confused. As a solution, Flesch advocated a revival of the phonics method, the teaching of reading by teaching learners to sound out words using rules. The book inspired Dr. Seuss to write The Cat in the Hat (1957).

Flesch flourished as a writing teacher, plain-English consultant, and author. He published many books on the subject of clear, effective communication: How To Test Readability (1951), How To Write Better (1951), The Art of Plain Talk (1946), The Art of Readable Writing (1949), The ABC of Style: A Guide to Plain English (1964), and Rudolf Flesch On Business Communications: How to Say What You Mean in Plain English (1972).

Flesch produced three other books of note:

In The Art of Clear Thinking (1951), Flesch consolidated research data and findings of psychology and education, showing people how they can apply those ideas to their lives. "It would be impudent to tell intelligent, grown up people how to think," he wrote in this book's introduction. "All I have tried to do here is to assemble certain known facts about the human mind and put them in plain English".

In Lite English: Popular Words That Are OK to Use No Matter What William Safire, John Simon, Edwin Newman, and the Other Purists Say! (1983), Flesch advocated the use of many colloquial and informal words.

In How to Write Plain English: A Book for Lawyers and Consumers (1979), which he produced while working as a communication and writing consultant to the Federal Trade Commission, Flesch wrote a "how-to" guide for writing rules and regulations, with a preface by then FTC Chairman Michael Pertschuk.

Flesch also developed two evaluations of the reading level of written texts, now known as the Flesch–Kincaid readability tests.

== Bibliography ==
- The Art of Plain Talk (1946)
- The Art of Readable Writing (1949)
- How to Write Better (1951)
- The Art of Clear Thinking (1951)
- How to Test Readability (1951)
- Why Johnny Can't Read—And What You Can Do About It (1955)
- How to Write, Speak and Think More Effectively: Your Complete Course in the Art of Communication (1960)
- How to be Brief: An Index to Simple Writing (1962)
- The ABC of Style: A guide to Plain English (1964)
- Rudolf Flesch on Business Communications: How to Say What You Mean in Plain English (1972)
- How to Write Plain English: A Book for Lawyers and Consumers (1979)
- Lite English: Popular Words That Are OK to Use No Matter What William Safire, John Simon, Edwin Newman, and the Other Purists Say! (1983)
- Why Johnny Still Can't Read—A New Look at the Scandal of Our Schools (1981)
