= Flesch–Kincaid readability tests =

Indicator for the complexity of texts

Graphs of Flesch-Kincaid Reading-Ease (red) and grade level (gray) scores against average syllables per word and average words per sentence

The Flesch–Kincaid readability tests are readability tests designed to indicate how difficult it is for a reader to understand a given passage of written English. The Plain English proponent, Rudolf Flesch devised the Reading-Ease test to evaluate the readability of an English text. Later, Flesch and the psychologist J. Peter Kincaid jointly developed the Grade Level test for the U.S. Navy.

The two tests of the readability of an English text are: (i) the Flesch Reading-Ease test and (ii) the Flesch–Kincaid Grade Level test. Each test of written-language use applies the same core measures (word length and sentence length) to a text, but each test gives different critical weight in evaluating the readability-measures of a text written in English. The results of the readability tests correlate approximately inversely: a text with a high-readability score on the Reading-Ease test should have a low-readability score on the Grade-Level test.

== History ==
"The Flesch–Kincaid" (F–K) reading grade level was developed under contract to the U.S. Navy in 1975 by J. Peter Kincaid and his team. Related U.S. Navy research directed by Kincaid delved into high-tech education (for example, the electronic authoring and delivery of technical information), usefulness of the Flesch–Kincaid readability formula, computer aids for editing tests, illustrated formats to teach procedures, and the Computer Readability Editing System (CRES).

The F–K formula was first used by the Army for assessing the difficulty of technical manuals in 1978 and soon after became a United States Military Standard. Pennsylvania was the first U.S. state to require that automobile insurance policies be written at no higher than a ninth-grade level (14–15 years of age) of reading difficulty, as measured by the F–K formula. This is now a common requirement in many other states and for other legal documents such as insurance policies.

== Flesch Reading-Ease ==
In the Flesch Reading-Ease test, higher scores indicate material that is easier to read, while lower numbers mark passages that are more difficult to read. The formula for the Flesch Reading-Ease score (FRES) test is:

$$206.835 - 1.015 \left( \frac{\text{total words}}{\text{total sentences}} \right) - 84.6 \left( \frac{\text{total syllables}}{\text{total words}} \right)$$

Scores can be interpreted as shown in the table below.

Score	School level (US)	Notes
100.00–90.00	5th grade	Very easy to read. Easily understood by an average 11-year-old student.
90.0–80.0	6th grade	Easy to read. Conversational English for consumers.
80.0–70.0	7th grade	Fairly easy to read.
70.0–60.0	8th & 9th grade	Plain English. Easily understood by 13- to 15-year-old students.
60.0–50.0	10th to 12th grade	Fairly difficult to read.
50.0–30.0	College	Difficult to read.
30.0–10.0	College graduate	Very difficult to read. Best understood by university graduates.
≤10.0	Professional	Extremely difficult to read. Best understood by university graduates.

Reader's Digest magazine has a readability index of about 65, Time magazine scores about 52, an average sixth-grade student's written assignment (age of 12) has a readability index of 60–70 (and a reading grade level of six to seven), and the Harvard Law Review has a general readability score in the low 30s. The highest (easiest) readability score possible is 121.22, but only if every sentence consists of only 1 one-syllable word. "The cat sat on the mat." scores 116. The score does not have a theoretical lower bound; therefore, it is possible to make the score as low as wanted by arbitrarily including words with many syllables. The sentence "This sentence, taken as a reading passage unto itself, is being used to prove a point." has a readability of 69. The sentence "The Australian platypus is seemingly a hybrid of a mammal and reptilian creature." scores 37.5 as it has 24 syllables and 13 words. While Amazon calculates the text of Moby-Dick as 10.8, one particularly long sentence about sharks in chapter 64 has a readability score of −146.77. One sentence in the beginning of Scott Moncrieff's English translation of Swann's Way, by Marcel Proust, has a score of −515.1.

The U.S. Department of Defense uses the Reading-Ease test as the standard test of readability for its documents and forms. Florida requires that insurance policies have a Flesch Reading-Ease score of 45 or greater.

The use of this scale is highly ubiquitous; that it is bundled with popular word processing programs and services such as KWord, IBM Lotus Symphony, Microsoft Word, WordPerfect, WordPro, and Grammarly. The writing platform Ellipsus also uses the scale for its text complexity score.

Polysyllabic words affect this score significantly more than they do the grade-level score.

== Flesch–Kincaid grade level ==
These readability tests are used extensively in the field of education. The "Flesch–Kincaid Grade Level Formula" presents a score as a U.S. grade level, making it easier for teachers, parents, librarians, and others to judge the readability level of various books and texts. It can also mean the number of years of education generally required to understand this text, relevant when the formula results in a number greater than 10. The grade level is calculated with the following formula:

$$0.39 \left ( \frac{\mbox{total words}}{\mbox{total sentences}} \right ) + 11.8 \left ( \frac{\mbox{total syllables}}{\mbox{total words}} \right ) - 15.59$$

The result is a number that corresponds with a U.S. grade level. The sentence, "The Australian platypus is seemingly a hybrid of a mammal and reptilian creature" is an 11.3 as it has 24 syllables and 13 words. The different weighting factors for words per sentence and syllables per word in each scoring system mean that the two schemes are not directly comparable and cannot be converted. The grade level formula emphasizes sentence length over word length. By creating one-word strings with hundreds of random characters, grade levels may be attained that are hundreds of times larger than high school completion in the United States. Due to the formula's construction, the score does not have an upper bound.

The lowest grade level score in theory is −3.40 (belonging to the passage "Go. See. Stop. Rest." for example), but there are few real passages in which every sentence consists of a single one-syllable word. Green Eggs and Ham by Dr. Seuss comes close, averaging 5.7 words per sentence and 1.02 syllables per word, with a grade level of −1.3. (Most of the 50 used words are monosyllabic; "anywhere", which occurs eight times, is the only exception.)

== Limitations ==
As readability formulas were developed for school books, they demonstrate weaknesses compared to directly testing usability with typical readers. They neglect between-reader differences and effects of content, layout and retrieval aids.

== See also ==
- Automated readability index
- Readability
