= Rosalind Gersten Jacobs =

American fashion buyer, art collector and patron of the arts

- Born: June 9, 1925
- Died: December 21, 2019 (aged 94)
- Education: B.A. Hunter College, New York City
- Occupations: Fashion buyer, arts patron
- Spouse: Melvin Jacobs (died 1993)
- Children: Peggy Jacobs Bader

Rosalind Gersten Jacobs (June 9, 1925 – December 21, 2019) was an American fashion buyer, retail executive, merchandise and marketing consultant, art collector, and patron of the arts. Along with her husband Melvin Jacobs, she built relationships with key artists from the Dada and Surrealist movements during the 1950s and 1960s and assembled a rare and notable collection of their works.

== Biography ==
Born in Manhattan, New York City, to Ida (née Goldstein) and Mark Gersten, Rosalind Gersten was the second of three children. She attended New York's Hunter High School and Hunter College, receiving her B.A. in 1946. She had a distinguished twenty-four year career as a pioneering retail buyer for Macy's, during which she built lasting relationships with artists whose work would form the core of a celebrated art collection.

In 1957, Gersten met and married Melvin Jacobs, a merchandise executive at Bloomingdale's. Their daughter Peggy was born in 1960, and they moved from New York City to Miami in 1972. Following a brief interlude in Cincinnati, she and her family returned to New York City in 1982 for her husband to take up his post as chairman and chief executive of Saks Fifth Avenue. From the 1970s to the early 1990s, photographs of the power couple frequently appeared on the pages of Women's Wear Daily and in the local press in New York City, Miami, Cincinnati, and elsewhere where they attended fashion, art, and philanthropic events. Gersten Jacobs was widowed in 1993, when her husband died months after his retirement.

== Career ==
After being accepted into the Macy’s training program in 1949, Gersten quickly became the head buyer for Macy’s Little Shop boutique at the New York City flagship store and was later promoted to vice president and fashion director for Macy's nationwide. Among her accomplishments in that capacity was the 1968 orchestration at the New York City store of the first comprehensive exhibition in the city of the 1960s generation of British artists. Over her twenty-four years with Macy's, she travelled to Europe numerous times and acquired items both commercially for Macy's Little Shop boutique and personally for her art collection.

When the family relocated to Miami in 1972, Gersten Jacobs commuted to New York for work until retiring from Macy's in 1975. From 1977 to 1998, she was director of merchandise and marketing at Corporate Property Investors.

== Art collecting ==
As reported upon her death in 2019, "Glass-ceiling-breaking retail executive Rosalind Gersten Jacobs also forged inroads in the world of Surrealist art." Shortly before embarking on her first overseas buying trip for Macy's, in 1954, she met American artists and art patrons Noma and William Copley who were visiting New York from their French home. As a result of that encounter, the Copleys would become lifelong friends, introducing her to the avant-garde circle of artists whose works she would go on to collect and whose friendships would greatly impact her life. She made frequent visits to their villa in Longpont-sur-Orge, which had become a central gathering place in postwar France for a community of Surrealists to reunite after their dispersal during the war.

On her 1954 buying trip to Paris, the Copleys introduced Gersten Jacobs to the American artist Man Ray and his wife Juliet. She developed a lifelong friendship with the couple, who—along with the Copleys—would provide entrée to a circle of artists who had been instrumental in the Dada and Surrealist movements during the interwar period. Black-and-white and color portraits Man Ray made of his new friend between 1956 and 1958 pay tribute to the relationship. On a subsequent trip to Paris in 1955, Gersten Jacobs met and befriended the American photographer Lee Miller and British Surrealist Roland Penrose. The hospitality the couple extended during her frequent visits to their Farley Farm House in Chiddingly, East Sussex, which had become a sort of artists' Mecca, were reciprocated in their visits to the Jacobs's home in New York City. The print of Miller's 1930 portrait of Charlie Chaplin in the Jacobs's collection was acquired as a result of that friendship.

The artwork that launched Gersten Jacobs’s collection in 1955 was a birthday gift from the Copleys of René Magritte’s L’Éloge de la Dialectique, an intriguing 1948 gouache she had admired hanging in the Copley’s Longpont home. Although Magritte would remain an artist of great interest—six additional works in various mediums would be added to the burgeoning assembly over the next several years—the artist whose work would ultimately define the collection was Man Ray. The couple’s first major acquisition of his work was the purchase in 1959 of his 1948 canvas Julius Caesar. One of twenty paintings in the Shakespearean Equations series the artist produced while living in Hollywood, the work had been among those featured in the Man Ray exhibition at Copley’s gallery in 1948. Over their years of friendship with the artist, the Jacobses acquired more than fifty works to include photographs, paintings, assemblages, prints, objects, and jewelry representing a trajectory of the artist’s career, as well as a selection of memorabilia.

Interest in supporting artists such as Man Ray during financially precarious periods in the artists’ lives was an impetus behind many of the Jacobs’s acquisitions. Over a number of years they acquired eleven of his rayographs and additional photographic prints dating from the 1920s to the 1960s. The centerpiece of the collection was Man Ray’s 1924 Le Violon d’Ingres, one of the most iconic images of the Surrealist movement. Immediately after encountering the work at the artist’s exhibition at the Bibliothéque Nationale in Paris in 1962 and recognizing its witty layering of meaning, Gersten Jacobs set out to acquire it. Following the publication of Man Ray's autobiography Self Portrait one year later, she and her husband threw a large party at their home to celebrate the book.

Le Violon d’Ingres would not be the last important work the couple would obtain in their immersion in a community of artists whose work remained largely overshadowed during the period in which their collection grew. Embraced as members of an extended family centered around Man Ray and Juliet and the Copleys, the Jacobses would also build lasting friendships with artists Magritte, Marcel Duchamp, Max Ernst, Dorothea Tanning, and dealers Julien Levy, Alexander Iolas, acquiring works directly from them. Other artists from the Dada and Surrealist movements represented in their collection include Hans Bellmer, Salvador Dalí, Roberto Matta, Francis Picabia, Joseph Cornell, Mina Loy, Leon Kelly, Yves Tanguy, Wols (Alfred Otto Wolfgang Schultze), and Paul Delvaux. Additionally, Roz was drawn to the jewelry artists were making, acquiring striking pieces at the intersection of her interests in fashion and art. Her jewelry collection grew to include brooches, bracelets, rings, earrings and other accessories not only by Man Ray but also Pablo Picasso, Matta, Ernst, Claude Lalanne, Roy Lichtenstein, Niki de Saint Phalle, and, especially, Noma Copley.

The Jacobses were able to assemble their unique collection due to their privileged position within the international art community, and it was a unique chapter in the collection of modern art. Gersten Jacobs reflected on their experience in an interview in 1999, noting that “[w]e moved in a visually exciting world of fashion and design and developed an affinity for art that challenged the boundaries of reality. Surrealism was not new when we discovered it in the fifties, but it was new to us . . . my attraction to it was immediate, it stretched my imagination.”

Rosalind and Melvin Jacobs continued to collect into the 1970s and ‘80s, adding works by younger artists they felt resonated with the Surrealists. These include Gilbert and George, Hilla and Bernd Becher, Arman, James Casebere, and Candida Hofer. After the family moved to Miami in 1972, Gersten Jacobs served on the Board of Governors during the formative period in the development of what subsequently became the Perez Art Museum.

The Jacobses maintained close friendships throughout their lives with the artists whose works they valued as extensions of those relationships. The couple's visit to Duchamp at his Manhattan apartment was followed in 1957 by a house call by the artist to consult about one his pieces in their collection they feared had been damaged. Noma Copley, their daughter Peggy's godmother, remained a close friend for decades. In addition to continued visits with Man Ray and Juliet and Miller and Penrose on both sides of the ocean, Gersten Jacobs organized a surprise birthday party for Juliet Man Ray in 1971 at La Méditerranée Restaurant in Paris, inviting Ernst and Tanning to join them. She was at Man Ray's bedside in his Paris studio reading to him shortly before he died in 1976.

== Later years ==
In her later life Gersten Jacobs remained active in support of the arts and served on the board of several organizations including The Merce Cunningham Dance Foundation, Learning Through Art (Guggenheim Museum's Children's Program), and the Museum of Contemporary Art, North Miami.

Rosalind Gersten Jacobs died at her home in New York City on December 21, 2019, at age 94.

== Legacy ==
Selected works from the Rosalind and Melvin Jacobs Collection have been lent to major exhibitions around the world. Exhibitions featuring their art collection were mounted at Miami’s Museum of Contemporary Art in 2000 and at the Pace/MacGill Gallery in New York City in 2009. In 2018, the Jacobs family gifted several significant works from the collection to The Philips Collection in Washington, D.C.

The record-breaking sale of "The Surrealist collection of Rosalind Gersten Jacobs and Melvin Jacobs," which took place in New York at Christie's on May 14, 2022, was a tribute to the singular vision of the couple. Records were broken for the sale at auction of several of the artists featured, most notably Man Ray's iconic Le Violon d'Ingres. Sold for $12.4 million, it nearly tripled the record for the most expensive photograph ever sold at auction.
