= Nicolas Martin du Nord =

French magistrate and politician

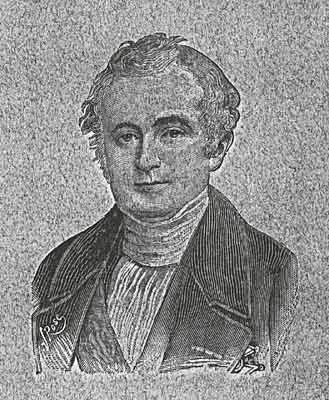
- Born: Nicolas-Ferdinand-Marie-Louis-Joseph Martin; 29 July 1790; Douai, Nord, France
- Died: 12 March 1847 (aged 56); Château de Lormoy, Longpont-sur-Orge, Essonne, France
- Occupations: Lawyer, politician
- Known for: Minister of Justice and Religious Affairs

Nicolas Martin du Nord (29 July 1790 – 12 March 1847) was a French magistrate and politician. He was Minister of Public Works, Agriculture and Commerce (1835–39) and Minister of Justice and Religious Affairs (1840–47).

== Early years ==
Nicolas Ferdinand Louis Joseph Martin was born in Douai, Nord, on 29 July 1790. His parents were Louis François Joseph Martin and Anne Louise Josèphe Jacquard. His family was bourgeois and respectable, but not wealthy. He studied at the college of Tournay. He went on to study law in Paris between 1808 and 1811, receiving his doctorate in law at the age of 21.

Martin began to practice at the bar of Douai, and soon gained a reputation. He was named in turn municipal councillor, assistant judge, and administrator and vice-president of the Douai hospices. He married Camille Emilie Gautier-Dagoty (1796–1814). They had one son, Victor, born in 1814. His second wife was Charlotte Lefebvre (1806–1879). They had two sons and two daughters. He was a supporter of constitutional monarchy, and welcomed the Bourbon Restoration (1814–1830). However, the regime did not live up to its promises, and Martin joined the loyal opposition. He was strongly opposed to the ordinances of 25 July 1830.

== July Monarchy ==
After the July Revolution, he ran for deputy for the Nord Department and was elected on 28 October 1830. He sat with the conservative majority. In the legislative debates he took the name Martin du Nord. In the general elections of July 1831 Martin become deputy for the college of Douai extra muros. He continued to be reelected with large majorities for this constituency until his death. On 5 April 1934 he was appointed Attorney-General at the Court of Appeal of Paris. Ten days later Louis-Philippe appointed him Attorney General at the Court of Peers.

On 20 September 1836 Martin was appointed Minister of Public Works, Agriculture and Commerce, but due to illness he was not able to take office until 16 October. As minister, he introduced legislation for construction of royal roads, seaports and canals, for establishing railways and for improving navigable rivers. He prepared a draft law for the exclusive application of the metric system, prohibited wool exports, lowered duties on foreign coal and increased incentives for agriculture. On 1 April 1839, he resigned his portfolio and retired with his cabinet colleagues. He was made vice-president of the Chamber of Deputies. On 29 October 1840 he was made Minister of Justice and Religious Affairs, holding office until 15 January 1847. He was removed for "health reasons", apparently to cover up some scandal.

Nicolas Martin du Nord died suddenly on 12 March 1847 at the Château de Lormoy, Longpont-sur-Orge, Essonne.

== Works ==
- Discours prononcé à l'audience solennelle de la cour royale de Paris (3 November 1835)
- Expulsion des Jésuites (1845)
