= Granville Barrere =

American politician (1829–1889)

Member of the U.S. House of Representatives from Illinois's 9th district
- In office March 4, 1873 – March 3, 1875
- Preceded by: Thompson W. McNeely
- Succeeded by: Richard H. Whiting

Personal details
- Born: July 11, 1829 New Market, Ohio
- Died: January 13, 1889 (aged 59) Canton, Illinois
- Party: Republican
- Education: Augusta College
- Alma mater: Marietta College

Granville Barrere (July 11, 1829 – January 13, 1889) was a U.S. representative from Illinois, nephew of Nelson Barrere.

== Early life and education ==
Born in New Market, near Hillsboro, Ohio, Barrere attended the common schools and Augusta College in Augusta, Kentucky, and graduated from Marietta College in Marietta, Ohio. He studied law.

== Career ==
Barrere was admitted to the bar in Chillicothe, Ohio, in 1853 and commenced practice in Marion, Arkansas. He moved to Bloomington, Illinois, in 1855, and then to Canton, Illinois, the same year, and continued the practice of his profession.

He served as member of the city board of education. He served as member of the board of supervisors of Canton.

== Later life and death ==
Barrere was elected as a Republican to the Forty-third Congress (March 4, 1873–March 3, 1875). He was an unsuccessful candidate for renomination in 1874. He resumed the practice of law. He died in Canton, Illinois, January 13, 1889. He was interred in Greenwood Cemetery in Canton.

U.S. House of Representatives
Preceded by Thompson W. McNeely	Member of the U.S. House of Representatives from Illinois's 9th congressional district 1873 – 1875	Succeeded by Richard H. Whiting
