= Richard Whiting =

Richard Whiting may refer to:

- Richard Whiting (abbot) (1461–1539), last Abbot of Glastonbury Abbey before the Dissolution of the Monasteries
- Richard A. Whiting (1891–1938), writer of popular songs, father of singer Margaret Whiting and actress Barbara Whiting Smith
- Richard H. Whiting (1826–1888), U.S. Representative from Illinois
- Richard Whiting (rugby league) (born 1984), English rugby league player
