= West Side Historic District (Aurora, Illinois) =

Historic district in Illinois, United States

- U.S. National Register of Historic Places
- U.S. Historic district
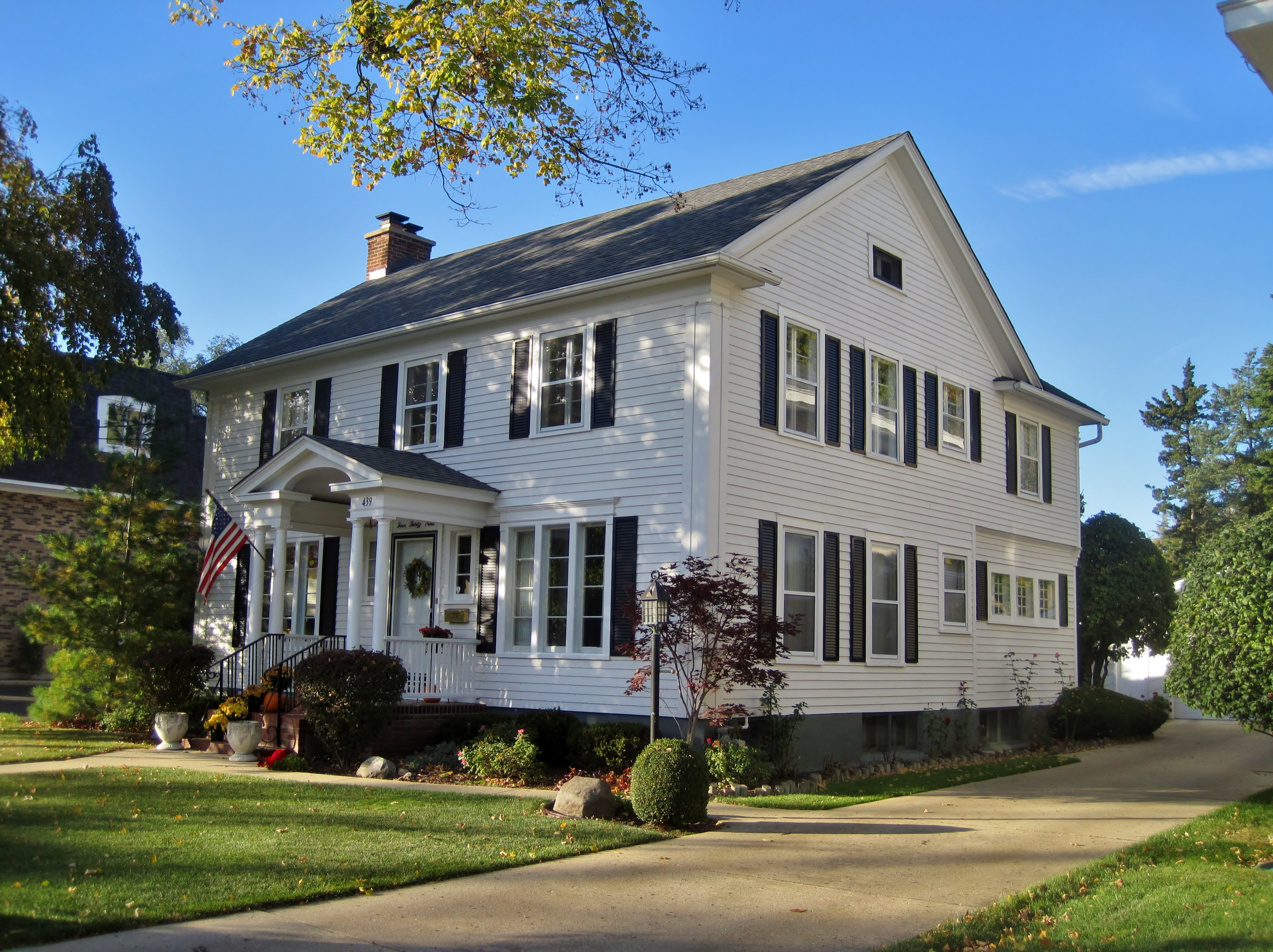
- Charles P. Burton House, a significant building in the district

- Location within Illinois Location within the United States
- Location: Roughly bounded by W. Downer Pl., Lake St., Garfield Ave., and S. Highland St., Aurora, Illinois
- Coordinates: 41°45′11″N 88°19′31″W
- Architectural style: Queen Anne; Italianate; Colonial Revival; Bungalow; Craftsman; Classical Revival; Prairie School
- NRHP reference No.: 86001484
- Added to NRHP: August 13, 1986

The West Side Historic District is a set of ninety-eight buildings on the west side of the Fox River in Aurora, Illinois. Of these, seventy-seven contribute to the historical value of the district.

== History ==
Aurora was platted by Samuel and Joseph McCarty in 1835. Aurora was a popular destination for settlers from the eastern United States due to its proximity to Chicago yet scenic atmosphere. The Chicago, Burlington and Quincy Railroad relocated its headquarters to Aurora in 1855. Expecting a rise in population due to the railroad's employment opportunities, Aurora platted a new residential section of land west of the Fox River. Aurora indeed expanded rapidly during that period, almost doubling in population from 1860 to 1874. Most of the new lands were along the river, with a section following several streets westward. Industrial growth followed in the 1880s, spurring a need for developed city services. Aurora became the first city to have electric street lighting in 1881.

The west side was originally noted for its wide range of Italianate residences. Two large apartment buildings were built along Downer Place between 1882 and 1890. As construction in the district continued in the 1890s, Queen Anne became the dominant architectural style. Smaller houses were built in the Foursquare style, some with Prairie School influences.

The west side district was the homestead for wealthy Aurora citizens throughout its history. Local pharmacist David Hurd owned a Second Empire home, constructed in 1856 and now recognized as an Aurora Landmark. Aurora mayor Fred O. White designed a Queen Anne residence that was completed after his death by his wife. White's sisters-in-law, Mary and Emma Todd, moved in shortly afterward. William Jobbins was the president of Alba Manufacturing Co. and lived in a 1909 Colonial Revival residence. The Col. Ira C. Copley Mansion was constructed for Ira Clifton Copley, founder of the Copley Press and later member of the U.S. House of Representatives from 1911 to 1923. His house was designed by Jarvis Hunt and constructed in 1917.

== See also ==
- Healy Chapel, located within the district but listed as a non-contributing structure.
