= Khudyakov =

Khudyakov (Russian: Худяков, from худой meaning slender) is a Russian masculine surname, its feminine counterpart is Khudyakova. It may refer to:

- Maxim Khudyakov (born 1986), Kazakhstani ice hockey forward
- Henry Khudyakov (1930–2019), Soviet American poet and multidisciplinary artist
- Nataliya Khudyakova (born 1985), Ukrainian swimmer
- Roman Khudyakov (born 1977), politician from Transnistria
- Sergei Khudyakov (1902–1950), Soviet Armenian Marshal of the aviation
- Vasily Khudyakov (1825–1871), Russian painter

== See also ==
- Arakcheev and Khudyakov case
