= Corporate Property Investors =

American real estate investment trust

- Industry: Real estate investment trust
- Founded: 1971; 55 years ago
- Founder: Disque Deane
- Defunct: 1998; 28 years ago
- Fate: Acquired by Simon DeBartolo Group Inc.
- Successor: Simon Property Group

Corporate Property Investors was a real estate investment trust that built several notable shopping centers, including Lenox Square in Atlanta, the Burlington Mall in Massachusetts, and Roosevelt Field Mall in New York.

== History ==
CPI was founded in 1971 by Disque Deane.

From 1977 to 1998, fashion buyer and pioneering art patron Rosalind Gersten Jacobs was director of merchandise and marketing.

In 1982, the company financed the General Motors Building in Manhattan with $500 million and received an option to buy the building. In 1991, the company acquired the General Motors Building for $500 million.

In January 1998, The Rouse Company bid for the company. However, Rouse was outbid and CPI was acquired by Simon Property Group. The General Motors Building was separately sold to Donald Trump and CNO Financial Group for $800 million.
