= Frank R. Reid =

American politician (1879–1945)

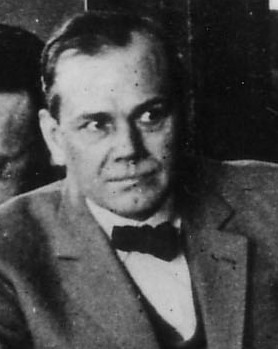

Member of the U.S. House of Representatives from Illinois's 11th district
- In office March 4, 1923 – January 3, 1935
- Preceded by: Ira Clifton Copley
- Succeeded by: Chauncey W. Reed

Member of the Illinois House of Representatives
- In office 1911–1912

Personal details
- Born: Frank Reid; April 18, 1879 Aurora, Illinois, U.S.
- Died: January 25, 1945 (aged 65) Aurora, Illinois, U.S.
- Party: Republican

Frank R. Reid (April 18, 1879 – January 25, 1945) was an American lawyer and politician who served six terms as a U.S. Representative from Illinois from 1923 to 1935.

== Biography ==
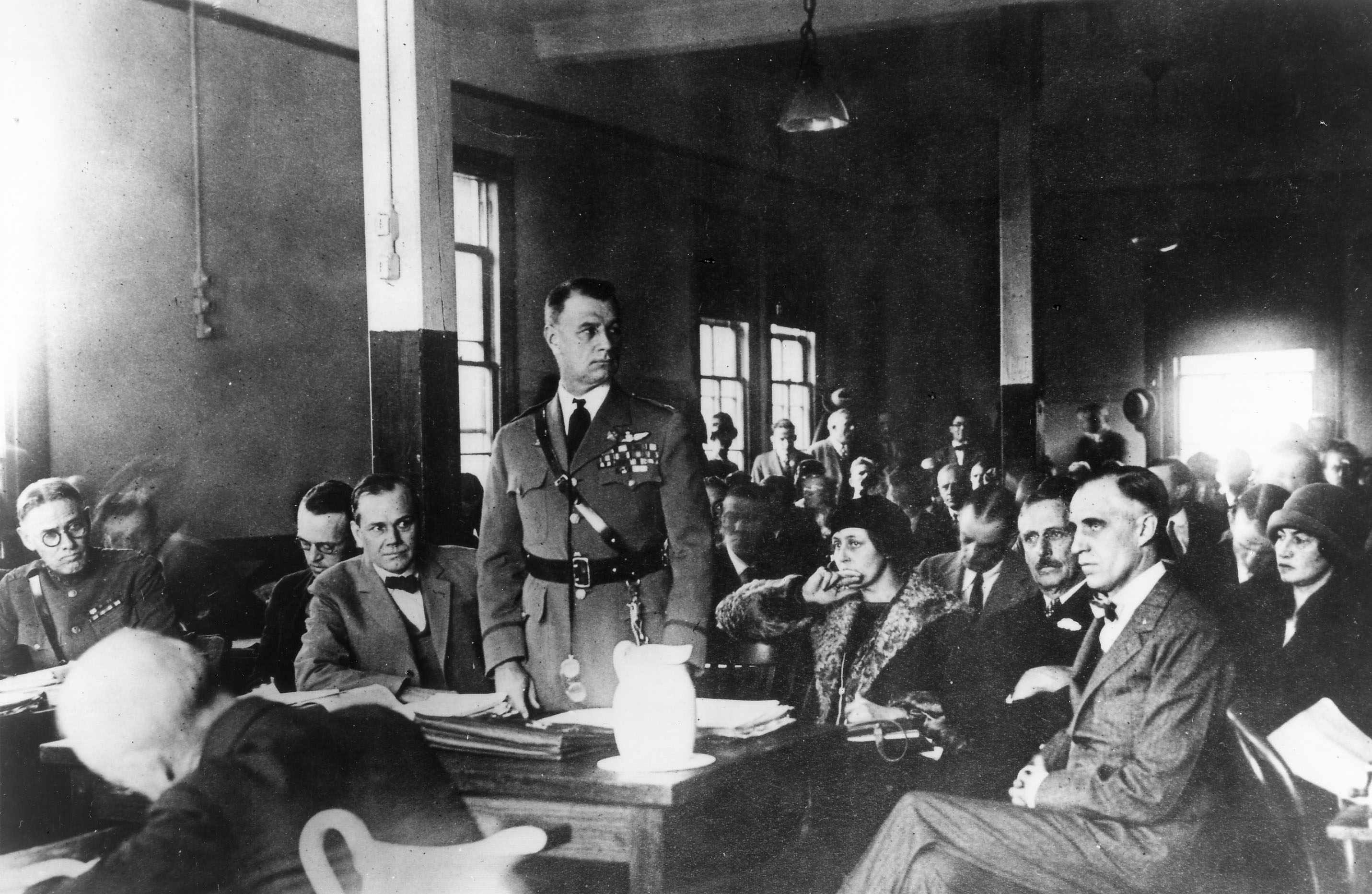
Gen. "Billy" Mitchell's court-martial, 1925. Reid is seated to Mitchell's right.

Born in Aurora, Illinois, Reid was one of eleven children of an Irish grocery store owner. He was christened without a middle name and later chose the letter "R" for an initial. Reid attended the public schools, the University of Chicago, and the Chicago College of Law. He was admitted to the bar in 1901 and commenced practice in Aurora, Illinois.

=== Early political career ===
He served as prosecuting attorney of Kane County 1904–1908. State's attorney 1904–1908. He served as assistant United States attorney at Chicago 1908–1910. He served as member of the State house of representatives in 1911 and 1912. He served as chairman of the Kane County Republican central committee 1914–1916. Secretary of the League of Illinois Municipalities in 1916 and 1917.

=== Congress ===
Reid was elected as a Republican to the Sixty-eighth and to the five succeeding Congresses (March 4, 1923 – January 3, 1935). He served as chairman of the Committee on Flood Control (Sixty-ninth through Seventy-first Congresses).

While serving on the House Aircraft Committee, he met Gen. Billy Mitchell, who was testifying before the committee. On October 3, 1925, he was requested by Mitchell to act as defense counsel during Mitchell's court-martial in Washington, D.C. for "conduct to the prejudice of good order and discipline," and represented him pro bono. In the dramatic film about the trial, The Court-Martial of Billy Mitchell, Reid was portrayed by Ralph Bellamy.

He was not a candidate for renomination in 1934.

=== Later career and death ===
After leaving Congress, he engaged in the general practice of law at Chicago and Aurora, Illinois.

He died in Aurora, Illinois, on January 25, 1945. He was interred in Spring Lake Cemetery.

U.S. House of Representatives
Preceded by Ira Clifton Copley	Member of the U.S. House of Representatives from Illinois's 11th congressional district 1923–1935	Succeeded by Chauncey Reed
