= S.M.S. portfolios =

20th-century artist collective

S.M.S (Shit Must Stop) is a collection of artist's portfolios that were conceived by William Copley and Dimitri Petrov as they spoke about the long relationships with the artists. The collection was published biweekly from February to December 1968. Each issue is composed of diverse art pieces, created by individual artist that were deemed important during the period. The portfolios have a wide range of aspects such as dada, surrealism, and pop art that includes photography, sound, drawings and writings.

Six portfolios containing eleven to thirteen objects each, were produced in unsigned editions of 2000. There were 100 copies for a deluxe edition. Almost all of the 73 artists solely signed their contributions for the deluxe portfolio, while a few others chose to sign, number and/or date. Reportedly, there were also a very small handful of artists who did not sign at all.

This project was inspired by the Fluxus movement, which encouraged diverse artists to come together as a form of protest against galleries, not agreeing to them having the authority to determine the value of art. So, by bringing artists together without any establishments, which by means, without being judged and determined, played equally in their specific art areas. Each portfolio within the issue, is a dossier about the subject of personal impressions, and the way to establish their relationship between artist's impulse and impersonal meanings of practical reproduction. After merging them with the daily life, "Shit must Stop" shows the artist how to come to terms with forces that often drive them into the seclusion of the studio.

== Publication ==
=== Shit Must Stop N°1 ===
The First edition of Shit Must Stop contains 11 different portfolios from a variety of artists: Irving Petlin, Su Braden, James Lee Byars, Christo, Walter de Maria, Richard Hamilton, Kaspar Koening, Julien Levy, Sol Mednick, Nancy Reitkopf and La Monte Young & Marian Zazeela.

The artists each scaled their project to similar format; in this edition, a small size packet. Christo who was known for large environmental installations, scaled down his works in order to create a small-sized, two-dimensional diorama. Julian Levy also contributed a list of prescriptions for faux medications, capsules for artists he determined in need of treatment. In both cases the artist's voice to shine through, while still maintaining the integrity of William Copley's project. This issue reads more like a journal than the following issue, which seems more interactive.

=== Shit Must Stop N°2 ===
This Second issue is more experimental with works from Marcel Duchamp, Nicolas Calas, Bruce Conner, Marcia Herscovitz, Alain Jacquet, Ray Johnson, Lee Lozano, Meret Oppenheim, Bernard Pfreim, George Reavevy, and Clovis Trouille.

The cover, designed by Marcel Duchamp, is a white folder with a playable record album attached to the front. Printed on the record itself, in French, is the sentence "ESQUIVONS LES ECCHYMOSES DES ESQUIMAUX AUX MOTS EXQUIS", which roughly translates to “dodge the Eskimo bruises with exquisite words,” but functions as a sort of French tongue twister. Duchamp seems to be playfully addressing the restrictions inherent in more traditional portfolio design in order to redefine this practice. The record has aesthetic appeal, but it similarly has far greater use value than the first issue's front cover, which was a reproduction of a painting. Another particularly provocative work in Shit Must Stop N°2 is Bruce Connor's Legal Tender. Connor mimics the design of American currency with his stack of eighteen “dollar bills,” which seem more reminiscent of Monopoly money than American legal tender. This element allows for the whole issue to feel like a game, as if you could trade Connor's money for something more valuable.

=== Shit Must Stop N°3 ===
Third publication is conceived by 12 artists: John Battan, Aftograf, Enrico Baj, Billy Copley, Dick Higgins, Joseph Kosuth, Ronnie Landfield, Roland Penrose, Man Ray, H.C Westermann, Hannah Weiner, and Terry Riley.

It contains the widest variety of objects. It features two Terry Riley cassettes, four pieces of mail from H.C. Westermann, seemingly addressed to the reader, and even an original Man Ray readymade. Terry Riley, made famous for his innovative, minmalist musical compositions, contributed two beautifully packaged cassettes, which feel like gifts in their own right. H.C. Westermann, who is known for his playful line drawings, mailed four drawings to William Copley, who reproduced them to an exact degree in the issue. In the sealed envelopes are four proposals, with Westermann's own notes included. Opening these letters felt as if the recipient was receiving mail from Westermann themself, which seems to have been Copley's intention by including in the issue exactly what he received from Westermann.

=== Shit Must Stop N°4 ===
The fourth issue contains works from Robert Stanley, Arman, Paul Bergtold, John Cage, Hollis Frampton, On Kawara, Roy Lichtenstein, Lil Picard, Domenico Rotella, Robert Watts, Princess Winifred, La Monte Young, and Marian Zazeela.

Each piece is laden with a conceptual mythology that can be thoroughly investigated or just taken at face value, which seems a great leap from the playful nature of the first few issues. A particularly interesting work from Shit Must Stop N°4 is Lil Picard's burned bowtie. Each bowtie was hand burned, thus each number in the edition is slightly varied. The maroon and white polka dotted tie first appears as a joyful addition, but the burned edges seem a quite poignant dissenting argument. Other interesting works are Rotella's prison poems, which were clandestinely written on scraps of paper during a five-month prison sentence in Rome, Italy. The tactile nature of the poems as works of art in their own right seems important for the overall impact of the piece, which elegantly replicates a minute part of Rotella's prison experience.

=== Shit Must Stop N°5 ===
The fifth issue featured Congo, William Anthony, Wall Batterton, William Copley, Edward Fitzgerald, Neil Jenny, Angus MacLise, Bruce Nauman, Yoko Ono, Mel Ramos, Robert Rohm, William Schwedler, Diane Wakoski, and Lawrence Weiner

Unlike the previous issues, this one doesn't appear to be projecting a specific sensibility upon the reader, thus making it seem more disparate than the others. This seems to be best exemplified by Yoko Ono's contribution, entitled Mend Piece for John, which instructs, “Take your favourite cup. Break it in many pieces with a hammer. Repair it with this glue and this poem.” Included is a cardboard box containing a ribbon, plastic bag, instructions, a poem, and a tube of glue. Although Ono created this piece years before the Beatles disbanded, it seems almost precognitive of the years to come. Another similarly disparate piece from this issue is the front cover, which was painted by Congo, the chimpanzee, for a study of the creative potential of apes. It has been noted that Congo was the only chimpanzee who appeared to make aesthetic decisions about his painting, and thus could be featured alongside these other artists for the issue. Like Ono's piece, Congo's painting seems eerily foreboding with its large red and black smears of paint.

=== Shit Must Stop N°6 ===
The last issue produced makes an attempt at preserving the initial integrity of the project. The issue includes are by, Richard Artschwager, Ed Bereal, Diter Rot, Betty Dodson, Ronoldo Ferri, John Giorno, Toby Mussman, Adrian Nutbeem, Claes Oldenburg, Mischa Petrov, Jean Reavey, Bernar Venet.

Richard Artschwager’s cover design is a simple image of a black shape reproduced on each surface of the cover, both inside and out, with reproductions of the exact coffee stains he accidentally made when producing the original. By approving of this accident, and reproducing it for the cover, Artschwager, and Copley seem to be making an argument about the place of beauty and mistake in the contemporary art world. The rest of the pieces in this final issue seem to be playful and mischievous manifestations of this same idea, with Adrian Nutbeem’s unsolvable crossword as well as Claes Oldenburg’s Unattended Lunches. The issue also comes with an apology, which reads, “The publishers of the Letter Edged in Black Press, Inc. regretfully announce that this is the last issue of Shit Must Stop that will appear. We have appreciated your support and hope you will remember our effort with appreciation.” The vague nature of the card supports the mischievous nature of this issue's contents, while still maintaining the sincerity of the project.
