= Howard M. Snapp =

American politician (1855-1938)

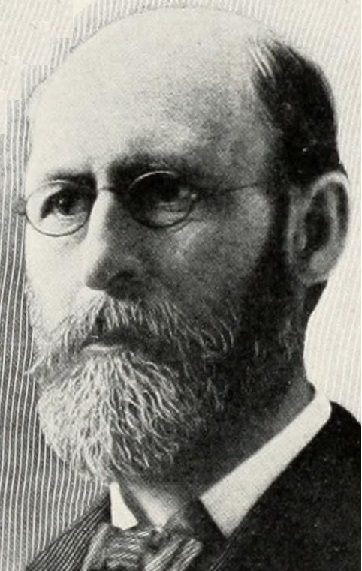
- From 1905's Republicans of Illinois

Member of the U.S. House of Representatives from Illinois's 11th district
- In office March 4, 1903 – March 3, 1911
- Preceded by: Walter Reeves
- Succeeded by: Ira Clifton Copley

Personal details
- Born: September 27, 1855 Joliet, Illinois
- Died: August 14, 1938 (aged 82) Joliet, Illinois
- Party: Republican

Howard Malcolm Snapp (September 27, 1855 – August 14, 1938) was an American lawyer who served four terms as a U.S. Representative from Illinois from 1903 to 1911.

== Biography ==
Howard Snapp was the son of Henry Snapp who had also been a U.S. representative from Illinois.

Born in Joliet, Illinois, Snapp attended the Eastern Avenue school and Forest University in Chicago, Illinois from 1872 to 1875. Snapp studied law. He was admitted to the bar in 1878 and commenced practice in Globe, Arizona and returned to Joliet, Illinois, and continued the practice of law. He served as master in chancery for Will County, Illinois, from 1884 to 1903.

=== Political career ===
Snapp was elected chairman of the Will County Republican central committee in 1893. He served as delegate to the Republican National Conventions in 1896 and 1908.

==== Congress ====
was elected as a Republican to the Fifty-eighth and to the three succeeding Congresses (March 4, 1903 – March 3, 1911). He was not a candidate for renomination in 1910.

=== Later career and death ===
He resumed the practice of law in Joliet, Illinois. He died in Joliet, Illinois, August 14, 1938. His interment was located in Joliet's Elmhurst Cemetery.

U.S. House of Representatives
Preceded by Walter Reeves	Member of the U.S. House of Representatives from Illinois's 11th congressional district 1903–1911	Succeeded by Ira C. Copley
