= Walter Reeves =

American politician

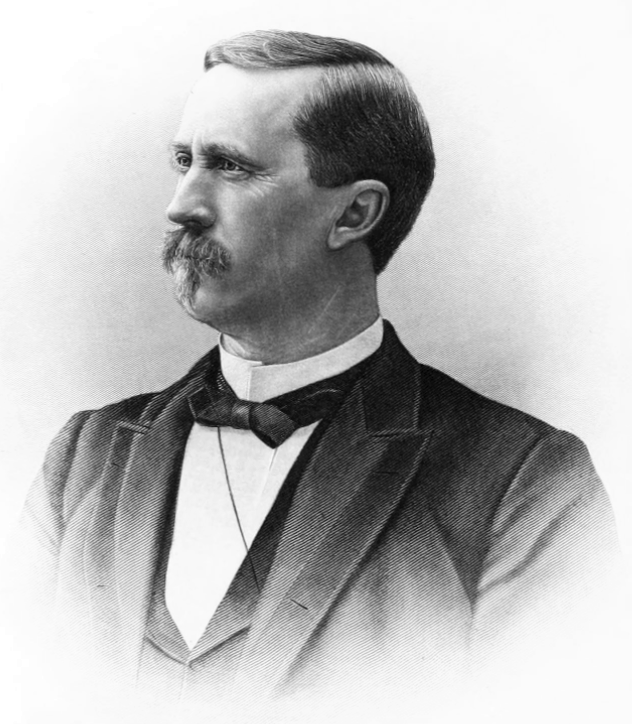

Member of the U.S. House of Representatives from Illinois's 11th district
- In office March 4, 1895 – March 3, 1903
- Preceded by: Benjamin F. Marsh
- Succeeded by: Howard M. Snapp

Personal details
- Born: September 25, 1848 Brownsville, Pennsylvania
- Died: April 9, 1909 (aged 60) Streator, Illinois
- Party: Republican

Walter Reeves (September 25, 1848 – April 9, 1909) was an American educator, lawyer, and politician who served four terms as a U.S. representative from Illinois from 1895 to 1903.

== Biography ==
Walter Reeves was born near Brownsville, Pennsylvania on September 25, 1848. He moved with his parents to Illinois in 1856, where they settled upon a farm in La Salle County.

He attended the public schools, and later taught school while studying law. He was admitted to the bar in Mount Vernon, Illinois, in 1875, and commenced practice in Streator, Illinois.

=== Congress ===
Reeves was elected as a Republican to the Fifty-fourth and to the three succeeding Congresses (March 4, 1895 – March 3, 1903). He served as chairman of the Committee on Patents (Fifty-seventh Congress). He was not a candidate for renomination in 1902. He was an unsuccessful candidate for the Republican nomination for governor in 1900.

=== Later career and death ===
After Congress, he resumed the practice of law.

He died at his home in Streator, Illinois on April 9, 1909, and was interred in Riverview Cemetery.

U.S. House of Representatives
Preceded by Benjamin F. Marsh	Member of the U.S. House of Representatives from Illinois's 11th congressional district 1895–1903	Succeeded by Howard Snapp
