= Thompson W. McNeely =

American politician (1835–1921)

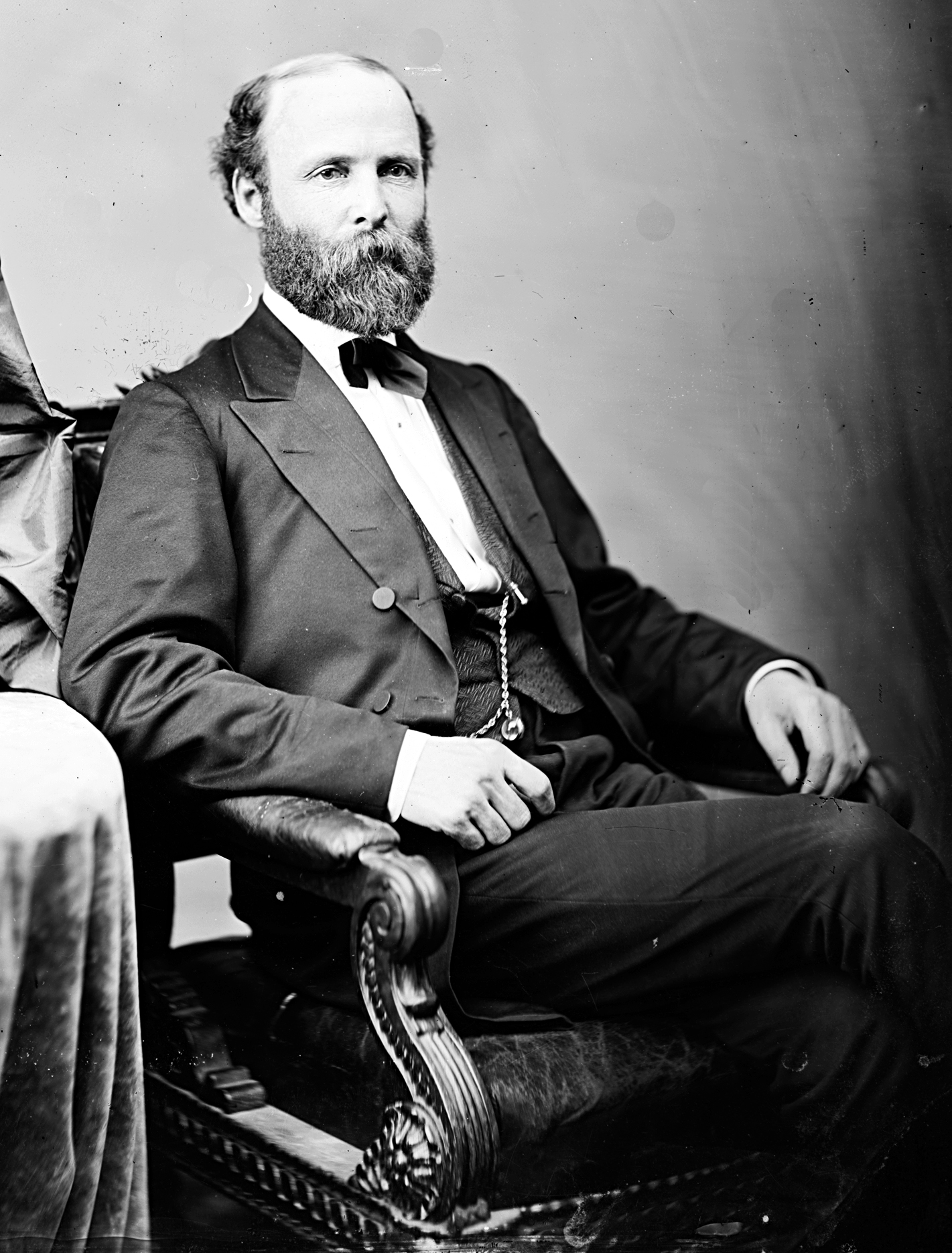

Member of the U.S. House of Representatives from Illinois's 9th district
- In office March 4, 1869 – March 3, 1873
- Preceded by: Lewis Winans Ross
- Succeeded by: Granville Barrere

Personal details
- Born: Thompson Ware McNeely; October 5, 1835 Jacksonville, Illinois
- Died: July 23, 1921 (aged 85) Petersburg, Illinois
- Party: Democratic
- Education: University of Louisville
- Occupation: Attorney

Thompson Ware McNeely (October 5, 1835 – July 23, 1921) was a U.S. representative from Illinois.

Born in Jacksonville, Illinois, Mcneely attended the public schools and Jubilee College in Peoria, Illinois. He graduated from Lombard College in Galesburg, Illinois in 1856 and from the law department of the University of Louisville in Louisville, Kentucky in 1857. He was admitted to the bar in 1857 and commenced practice in Petersburg, Illinois. He served as member of the Illinois constitutional convention in 1862.

McNeely was elected as a Democrat to the Forty-first and Forty-second Congresses (March 4, 1869 – March 3, 1873) from Illinois's 9th congressional district. He did not seek renomination in 1872. He served as delegate to the Democratic National Conventions in 1872, 1892, and 1896. He resumed the practice of law in Petersburg, Illinois. He served as master in chancery for Menard County from 1910 until his death in Petersburg, Illinois, July 23, 1921. He was interred in Rosehill Cemetery.

U.S. House of Representatives
| Preceded by Lewis Winans Ross | Member of the U.S. House of Representatives from Illinois's 9th congressional district 1869 – 1873 | Succeeded by Granville Barrere |
