= Henry Khudyakov =

Russian-American artist (1930–2019)

- Born: 05 December 1930; Chelyabinsk, Russia
- Died: 10 January 2019 (aged 88); Jersey City, New Jersey
- Known for: Art, Poetry
- Movement: Fluxus, Samizdat

Henry Fyodorovich Khudyakov (or Ghenrik, Russian: Генрих Фёдорович Худяков, 5 December 1930, Chelyabinsk, Russia – 10 January 2019, Jersey City, New Jersey) was a Russian-American painter and Poet. He completed high school in Moscow in 1948 and graduated from Leningrad University with a degree in Philology in 1959. He wrote poetry in Soviet Russia as part of the Samizdat movement, creating poems that were both visually and audibly artistic. Henry emigrated to New York City in 1974, where he shifted his creative expression to mixed media on canvas, clothing and other objects. Henry Khudyakov’s works are part of the collections of the Museum of Modern Art in New York (MoMA), Center Pompidou in Paris and others. He spent his later years living in Jersey City, New Jersey where he died on January 10, 2019.

== Early life ==
Henry Khudyakov's father worked at a national security sensitive enterprise and his mother was a literature teacher. As a child he showed interest in literature and began writing poetry. He read books on theosophy and anthroposophy and developed an interest in Gnosticism. Henry Khudyakov embarked on a career as an artist in 1959 when as a final year student at the Department of Philology of the Leningrad University he worked on developing theoretical grounding for his visual search as part of his poetic experimentation. After graduating, Khudyakov returned to Moscow where he worked as an art historian at the All-Union Traveling Poster Exhibition.

== Poetry and the Samizdat Movement ==
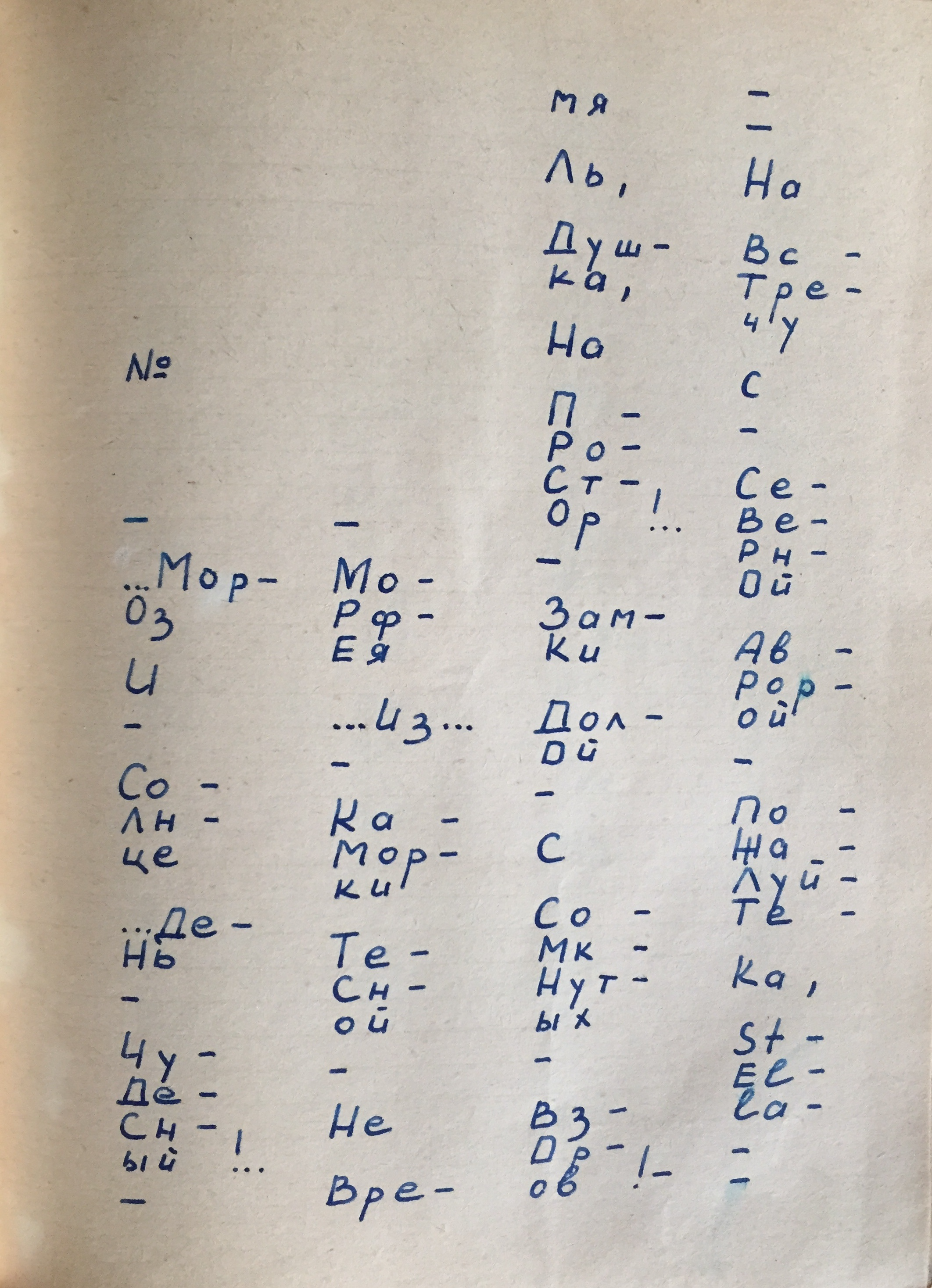
"Winter Morning" in Henry Khudyakov's style

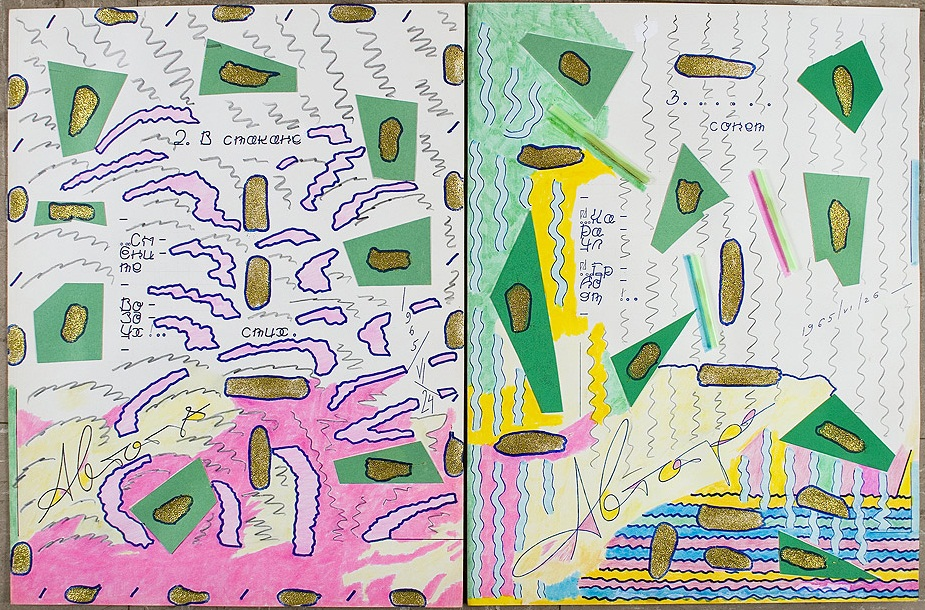
Katsaveiki 2

In the 1960s Henry Khudyakov released self-published books with poems under the pseudonym Aftograf:

- Cats —Bears
- Third One in addition to the Redundant
- Katsaveiki
- By Twos of All Flesh
- A book with poems in Japanese style titled "Haiku"

Cut off from official publication channels, his handwritten and typewritten books existed as part of the self-publishing movement, samizdat, outside the Soviet printed media, thus using a social ban as an opportunity for creative action. Henry Khudyakov became known in Moscow not only for his poetry, but also for the interpretation of his own work, a new “morphological” translation of Shakespeare’s “Hamlet” and his highly eccentric behavior.

He held exhibitions of his visually innovative poetry in the studios of various Moscow artists as early as the mid-1950s. "Koshki-Mishki ili zhe Tretii K Lishnim" (Kitty-bears or the Third to the Odd Ball, 1963), one of his early books was typed on carbon paper in ten copies, accompanied by a manifesto and handwritten commentary and copyrighted by his own publishing company. Khudyakov did not own a typewriter, as it was very difficult to obtain one in the Soviet Union, and had to type the book at a secret Moscow aviation institute where he worked as a translator, until he was caught and fired. The book mainly consisted of visual poems, representing a new interpretation of Russian morphology. One of his handwritten books, Katsaveiki (Shot Fur-trimmed Jackets), was reprinted in facsimile in the international edition of SMS, No. 3 by William Copley in 1968.

Henry Khudyakov created a new, visual style of poetry to better express the sharp, chaotic peaks of emotion he tried to convey in his poetry -- as he describes in an interview with Victor Tupitsyn:

V.T. When did you first begin to use visual imagery?

H.K. In fact, from the very beginning: even the poems written in columns are the direct result of a visual approach to the word. Once in 1962 when I wanted to transcribe into a notebook some rhymes an fragments of lines which were scattered over various bits of paper, it turned out that all this looked different than I expected. It turned out that I had substituted wishful thinking for reality: when written in a “line,” the purely verbal composition looked naive, and I sensed this once I had come in contact not just with the “ideal,” i.e., the abstract-semantic side of the matter, but with the material side: the paper, ink, letter symbols, etc. Soon I began to love the words around the paper in order to achieve the best layout. Eight months were spent on this, in the course of which I created a system for writing down my things.

== Emigrating to U.S.A. ==
In 1974, the artist emigrated to the United States where he continued to work in the fields of visual art and experimental poetry, combining various art forms. Although he favored brightly colored painting, collage, and clothing design, these often contain verbal elements, such as his favorite, the ubiquitous logo “I [love] N.Y.” where the word “love” is replaced by a heart symbol. The atmosphere of the New York art scene of the 1970s, which was dominated by the East Village movements, naturally provided a basis for Khudyakov’s further evolution as an artist. The East Village art scene, which brought together beatniks, performance artists, musicians, members of the Fluxus community, as well as gave birth to such celebrities as Jeff Koons, Keith Haring and Jean- Michel Basquiat, in many ways resonated with Henry Khudyakov. During this period, the artist’s tools were enriched by "found objects" from the streets of New York. He used them to produce his neckties, shoes, jackets, and shirts which acted as manifestos of his "ideal" world. Acquiring a new skin, made of badges, bottle caps, foil, adhesive tape, stickers, rhinestones, straws, sponges and toys, he would turn mundane objects into precious artifacts, offering new authenticity and new vision. Henry Khudyakov would sometimes spend 20 years finishing a piece. He would record every addition on the back of the canvas focusing more on the artistic process rather than the finished product.

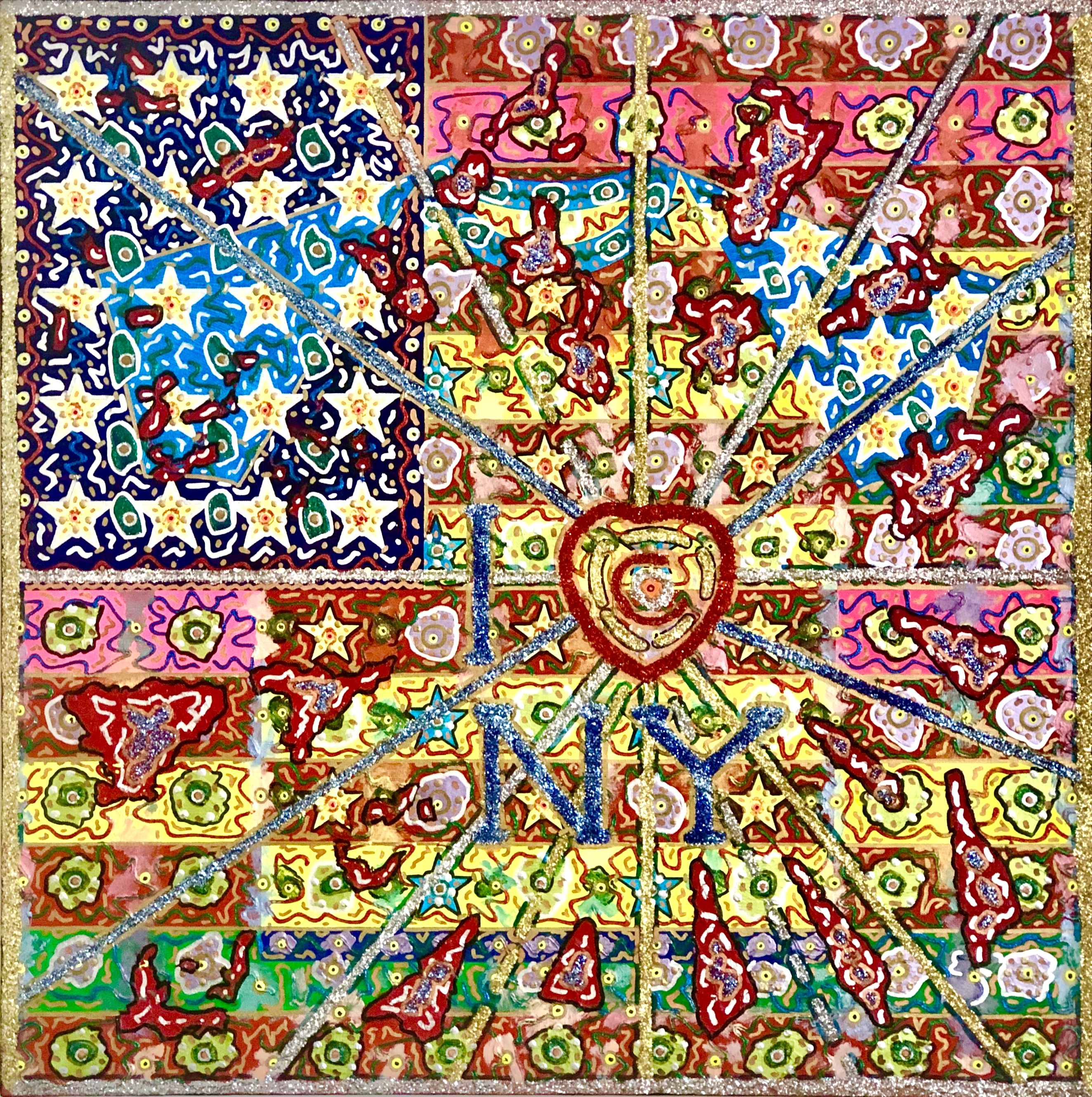
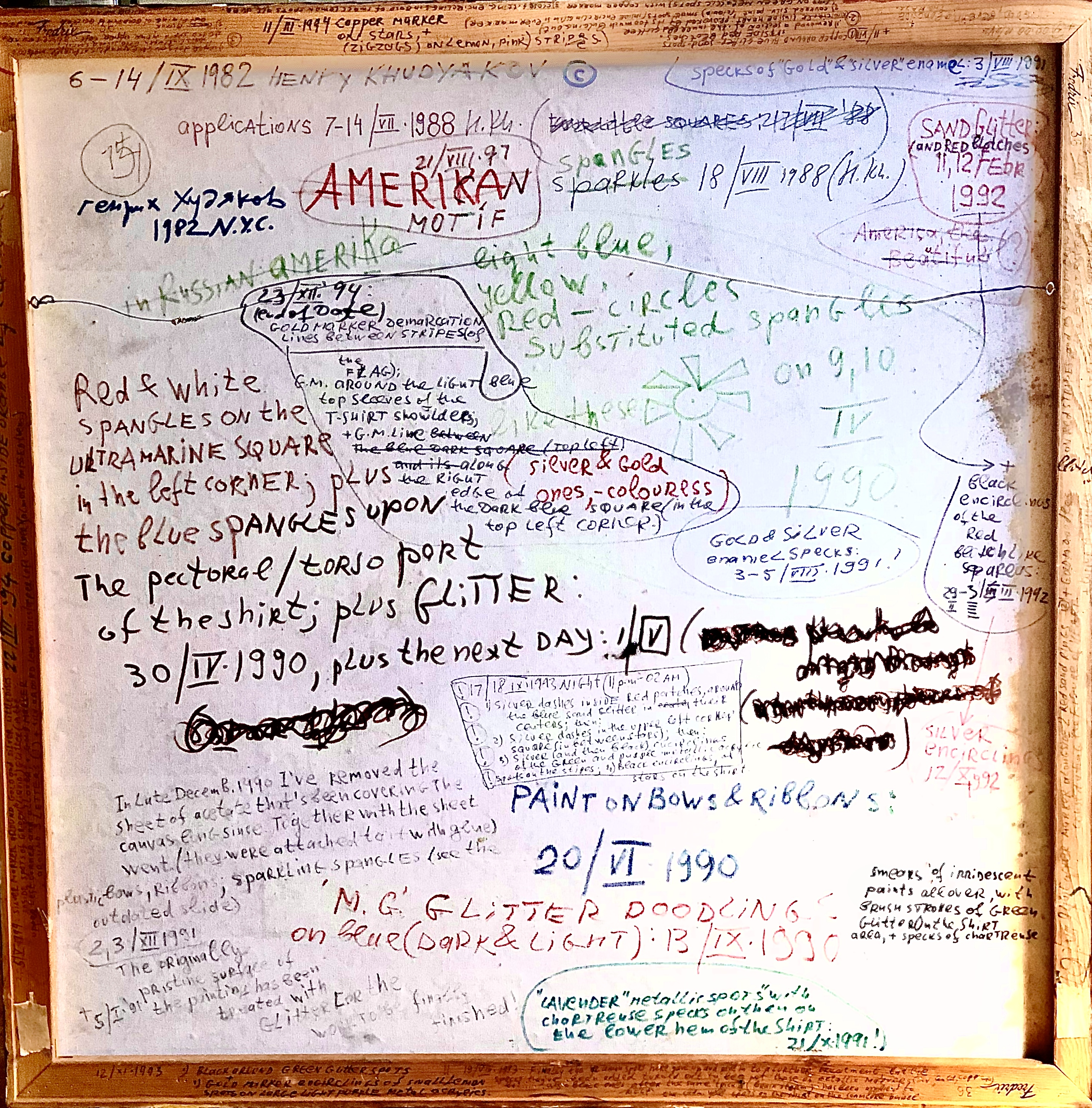

Amerika, Mixed media on canvas (1982-1994) Front and Back

== Exhibitions ==
- Contemporary Russian Art Center of America directed by Norton Dodge (1982)
- Nakhamkin Gallery (1991, New York)
- Fine Arts Museum of Long Island (1989, Hempstead, New York)
- Tabakman Museum of Contemporary Russian Art (1996, Hudson, New York)
- Black and White Gallery, The Last Brainstorm (2015)
- Hirschl & Adler Galleries represented Henry Khudyakov at the Outsider Art Fairs in Paris (2015) and New York (2016).
- Kollektsia! Contemporary Art in the USSR and Russia. 1950-2000» (2017, Center Pompidou)
- The Moscow Museum of Modern Art together with Tabakman Collection presented his work in a solo exhibit named "JUMBO LOVE".
- Black and White Gallery Space presented Henry Khudyakov at VOLTA NY in (2020)
