= Noma Copley =

American art collector and jewelry designer (1916–2006)

- Photo of Noma Copley by Man Ray, 1949
- Born: Norma Rathner; July 31, 1916; Minneapolis, Minnesota
- Died: February 22, 2006 (aged 89); New York, New York
- Occupations: Fine arts jeweler, art collector
- Spouse: William Copley (1953-1968)
- Partner: Flory Barnett (1986-2006)

Noma Copley (born Norma Rathner, July 31, 1916 – February 22, 2006) was an American fine arts jeweler and art collector noted for her contributions to Surrealist practices and activities. From 1953 through 1968, she was married to William Copley and, with him, helped to acquire one of the largest collections of Surrealist paintings and sculpture in America. In 1954, they established the William and Noma Copley Foundation (subsequently renamed the Cassandra Foundation), a non-profit organization dedicated to fostering the creative arts. According to a 1975 article in New York Magazine, she "emerged from the Paris world of surrealist painters five years ago to become one of New York's most original jewelry designers."

== Biography ==
Born in Minneapolis, Minnesota, on July 31, 1916, Norma Rathner was the only child of Russian immigrants Bess (nee Waxman) and Harry Rathner. On June 5, 1936, she married Abraham Elkon, a Belgian diamond merchant she met in New York City. The couple relocated to his native Belgium, returning to the U.S. in 1939, as Europe was on the verge of war. Following their divorce in 1941, she joined the U.S. Office of War Information (OWI), taking advantage of her fluency in both Flemish and French to work as a translator during the War. At its conclusion, she was commissioned to produce a film directed by Henri Cartier-Bresson called Le Retour, a documentary about the repatriation of French prisoners of war and deportees from Germany after the war.

Rathner (now going by the first name Noma) moved to Los Angeles after the war. There she met and became involved with the American avant-garde composer, George Antheil, who dedicated his Symphony No. 5 'Joyous' (1947–48) to her. Through her relationship with Antheil, she met the American artist Man Ray, who photographed her several times, the first being in 1949. While in Hollywood she worked for the producer Albert Lewin, and subsequently for Walt Disney.

On March 23, 1951, she moved from Los Angeles to Paris. Man Ray, who had recently relocated from Hollywood to Paris, introduced her to the artist and art patron William Copley whom she married on December 31, 1953. Man Ray served as best man at their wedding.

The Copleys acquired an estate in Longpont-sur-Orge, outside of Paris, which became a magnet for members of the Parisian interwar avant-garde who had dispersed during the war. Here they hosted many Surrealist artists and writers. Among the visitors who frequented gatherings at the villa were Man Ray and his wife Juliet, Marcel Duchamp, the American photographer Lee Miller and her husband, the British Surrealist Roland Penrose, and notable collectors of Surrealist art Melvin and Rosalind Gersten Jacobs. During this period, the couple expanded their collection, building upon works Bill had acquired in the course of running the Copley Galleries in Hollywood in 1947–48. The collection included iconic works by such 20th-century masters as Man Ray, Duchamp, Giorgio de Chirico, Hans Arp, René Magritte, Max Ernst, and Yves Tanguy.

Copley died on February 22, 2006, in New York City.

=== William and Noma Copley Foundation ===
In 1954, the couple launched the William and Noma Copley Foundation, dedicated to helping emerging artists and composers through grants. His focus was on artists, hers on composers. Leading members of the international avant-garde and art world were among the board members and advisors. The foundation gave grants to such emerging composers as John Cage and Benjamin Lees, and artists Joseph Cornell, Vija Celmins, Joseph Kosuth, Dieter Roth, Carolee Schneeman, Bruce Nauman, Christo, and Pop art pioneers Eduardo Paolozzi and Richard Hamilton. It also published a series of monographs and artists' books.

=== Art collection ===
The couple sold their Longpont home in 1962 and moved to Manhattan. Under Noma Copley's tutelage, Marcia Tucker became the curator and manager of the couple’s collection from 1964 to 1966, which proved to be a springboard for Tucker's curatorial career. In 1966, the Copleys renamed their foundation the Cassandra Foundation. When the couple divorced in 1968, they decided to keep the collection intact under William Copley's stewardship. The Sotheby Parke Bernet auction of the Copley collection in New York on November 5–6, 1979 set records for many of the artists in the sale.

== Jewelry designing career ==
After her divorce, Copley studied goldsmithing, and began a 25-year career as a fine arts jeweler hailed as starting a "whole new movement in 'pop' art jewelry." Characterized as “a surrealist for whom the displacement of the object is most important,” she was best known for works that represented ordinary objects such as zippers, buttons and pins and pencils that she cast in gold, as well incorporating the ancient art of granulation into contemporary works. A review of her work in the Los Angeles Times described her “Pop-surreal” jewelry as consisting of “beautifully wrought objects that reflect not only wit and sophistication but a highly individualistic spirit."

Copley’s frequent collaborators were Jean Stark and painter/goldsmith/framemaker Robert Kulicke. David Mamet, Nancy and Carroll O'Connor, and members of the Rothschild family were among those who commissioned singular pieces from her.

== Later years ==
In 1986, Copley met Flory Barnett, founder and ex-director of Lower Manhattan Cultural Council. They became partners, sharing an apartment together on Central Park West in Manhattan until Copley’s death in 2006. She died on February 23, 2006, at the age of 89.

== Legacy ==
Copley's iconic pencil bracelet is in the collections of the Museum of Fine Arts, Boston, and the Yale University Art Gallery, and reproduced in the book Jewelry by Artists: In the Studio, 1940–2000. Her ivory soap ring is in the collection of the Museum of Fine Arts, Houston and several of her pieces were on display in the 2011 exhibition "Picasso to Koons: Artist as Jeweler" at the Museum of Arts and Design in New York City. An 18K gold chain she designed that was collected by the Boston-based gallery owner Joan Sonnabend sold at auction in 2012 for $41,475.

Copley's enduring impact on wearable art was highlighted in the 2024–2026 exhibition, OUT of the Jewelry Box, at the Museum of Arts and Design. The exhibition showcased her surrealist designs focusing on “women’s sewing notions” alongside other influential studio jewelers. As noted in the exhibition catalog entry on Copley: "Functioning at the intersection of fun ('Do you get the joke?') and serious ('Pay attention to the quotidian!'), she turned overlooked feminine notions into gold, pointing out both their beauty and their functionality, and releasing them from the chamber of the invisible. They, and thus women, became seen, no longer overlooked."

Papers and correspondence related to her activities with the William and Noma Copley Foundation and with Marcia Tucker are located in the Getty Research Institute, Los Angeles.

Her image is included in the iconic 1972 poster Some Living American Women Artists by Mary Beth Edelson.
