= Col. Ira C. Copley Mansion =

Historic house in Illinois, United States

- U.S. National Register of Historic Places
- U.S. Historic district – Contributing property
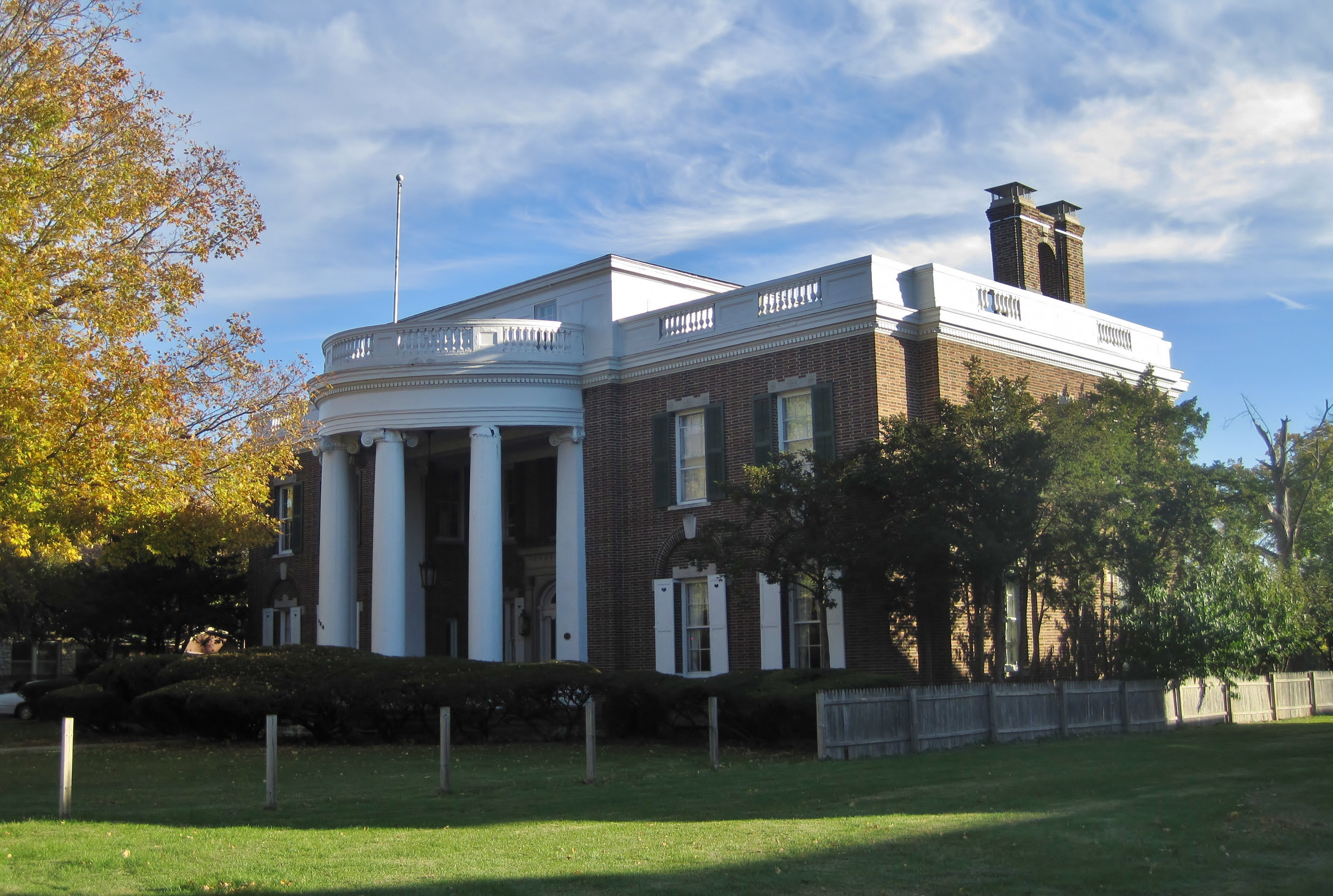

- Location within Illinois Location within the United States
- Interactive map showing the location of Col Ira C. Copley House
- Location: 434 W. Downer Pl. Aurora, Kane County, Illinois, United States
- Coordinates: 41°45′33″N 88°19′27″W
- Built: 1917
- Architect: Jarvis Hunt
- Architectural style: Classical Revival
- NRHP reference No.: 78001155
- Added to NRHP: March 29, 1978

The Colonel Ira C. Copley Mansion, is a historic residence in Aurora, Illinois.

== History ==
It was built in 1917 for Col. Ira Clifton Copley, the founder of Copley Press and a member of the U.S. House of Representatives. Designed by architect Jarvis Hunt, the building was completed in 1917 in a blend of Classical Revival and Federal Style trends. It was individually recognized on the National Register of Historic Places in 1978, and is part of the West Side Historic District.

== Architecture ==
Ira C. Copley's mansion was designed in 1906 by Jarvis Hunt, an architect from Chicago and finally completed in 1917. It is predominantly of Classical Revival design, but has many Federal Style features. The mansion is three stories tall and shaped like an "L". An ionic portico features on all sides, creating a porch that can be accessed from the ballroom. Consistent with Federal details, it has balustrades over the eaves. The main roof is hipped with a flat roof over the wings. A twin chimney emerges from the west side of the roof. The main entrance has slender pilasters and an elliptical fanlight between narrow sidelights. The exterior walls are Roman brick in a Flemish bond. The rear features a Palladian window with the lunette used to illuminate the third floor. The ballroom was located under the hipped portion of the roof.
