= Rush Copley Medical Center =

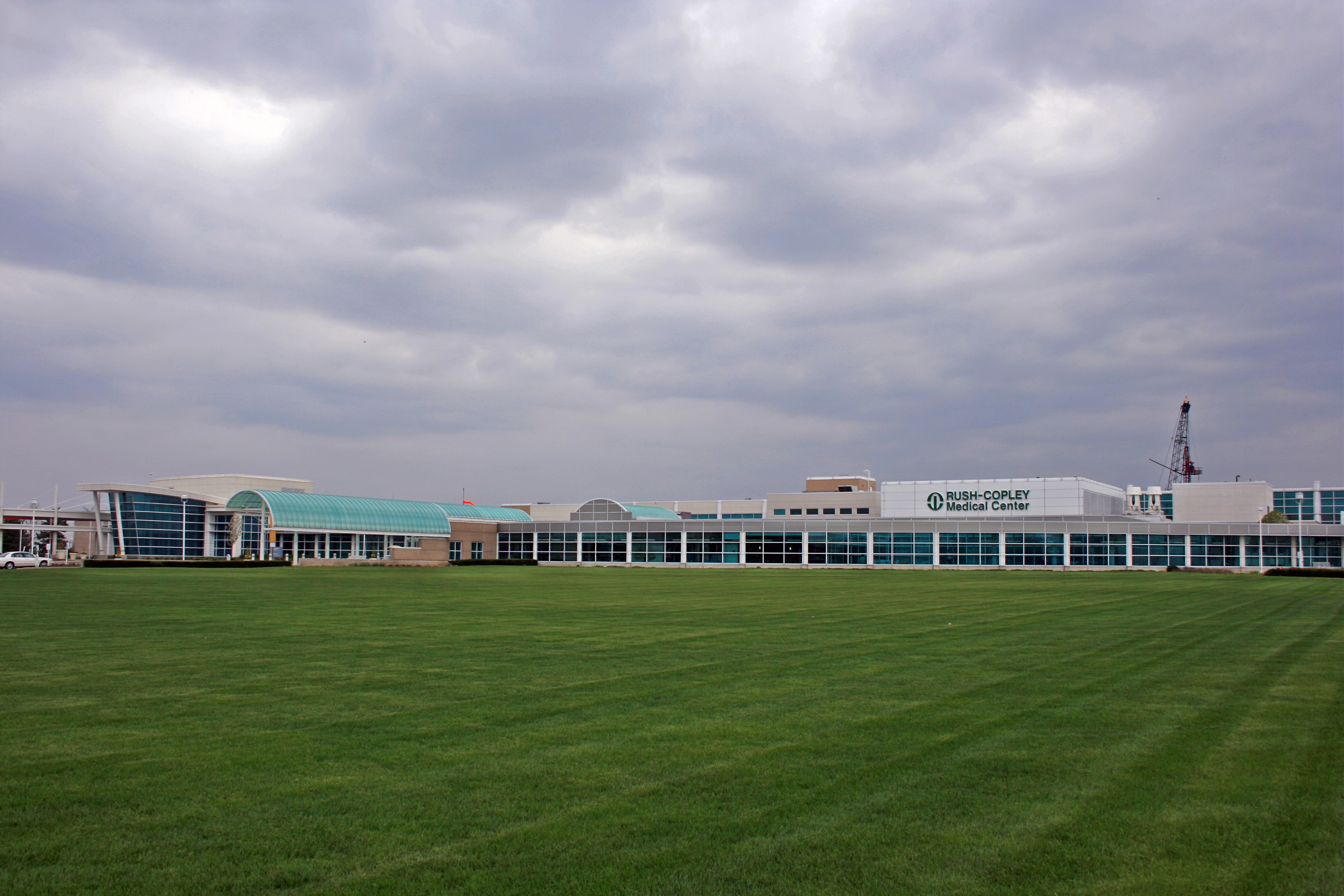

Geography
- Location: 2000 Ogden Avenue, Aurora, Illinois, United States
- Coordinates: 41°43′46″N 88°16′10″W

Organization
- Care system: General Hospital Heart Hospital Cancer Center
- Type: Acute Care
- Affiliated university: Rush University Medical Center

Services
- Emergency department: Level 2 Trauma Center
- Beds: 210

History
- Founded: 1886

Links
- Website: https://www.rush.edu/locations/rush-copley-medical-center
- Lists: Hospitals in Illinois

Rush Copley Medical Center is a 210-bed hospital in the greater Fox Valley area of Aurora, Illinois. It is named after Ira Clifton Copley, who donated over $2 million for the original hospital. It is part of the Rush University System for Health, which includes Rush University Medical Center in Chicago and Rush Oak Park Hospital.

The Cancer Care Center has been designated as a Comprehensive Community Cancer Center by the American College of Surgeons Commission on Cancer.

Rush Copley Neuroscience Services provides specialized care to the greater Fox Valley area.

The Heart and Vascular Institute is an accredited Chest Pain Center for the care of patients with acute coronary from the Society of Chest Pain Centers.

Emergency Services is a designated Level II Trauma Center that serves nearly 70,000 patients annually.

The health complex also includes a fitness center which includes exercise equipment, tennis, basketball, swimming, pickleball, etc. The center is used for fitness and physical therapy.

== See also ==
- Rush University
