= Healy Chapel =

- U.S. National Register of Historic Places
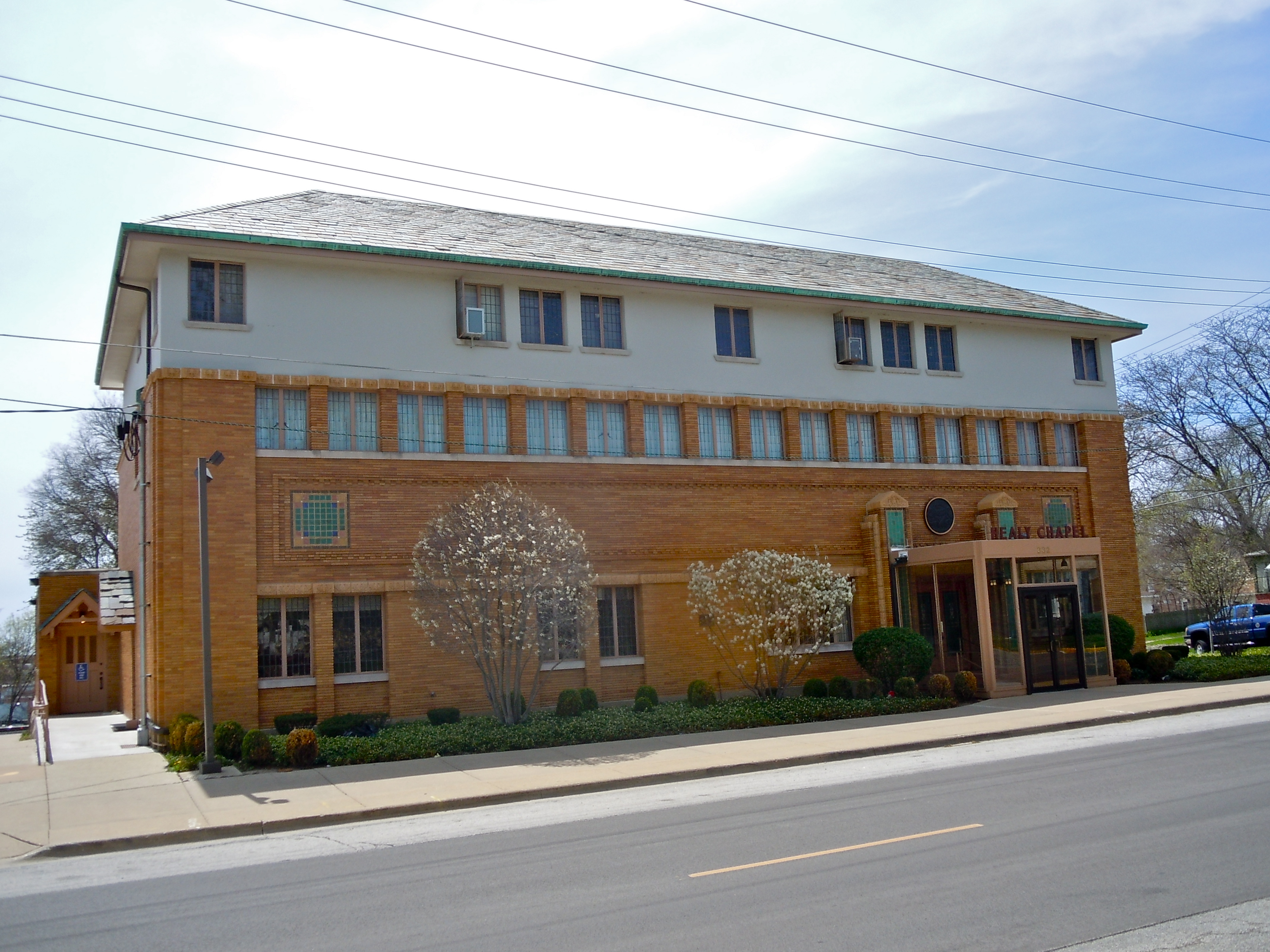
- Healy Chapel in 2011

- Location within Illinois Location within the United States
- Location: 332 W. Downer Pl. Aurora, Kane County, Illinois, United States
- Coordinates: 41°45′33″N 88°19′23″W
- Built: 1927
- Architect: George Grant Elmslie
- Architectural style: Prairie School
- NRHP reference No.: 85000361
- Added to NRHP: February 28, 1985

Healy Chapel is a historic mortuary in Aurora, Illinois. It was designed by George Grant Elmslie and is one of only a few Prairie School buildings designed for commercial purposes.

== History ==
William H. Healy moved from Yorkville, Illinois to Aurora in 1891. He opened "Healy and Blair", a furniture store that doubled as a mortuary. His brother, Arthur N. Healy, joined him in a new partnership in 1901 and they moved into a new building at 50 W Downer Place. Focusing almost exclusively on undertaking, the firm was officially incorporated in 1919. Increased demand for their services led to the need for a new building.

The Healy Chapel is one of only a few commercial buildings built in the Prairie School style. It was designed by George Grant Elmslie, a renowned architect who worked with Louis Sullivan. Like most Prairie School buildings, there is a strong emphasis on horizontal designs on the exterior. The three-story building features beige stucco along the third floor. A line of orange-glazed terracotta separates the stucco from the brick lower levels.

The building was constructed down the street from the old practice, at 332 W. Downer Place, and cost $100,000. The Healys were the first to bring hearse service to Aurora, and the Healy Chapel is recognized as the first building in the state exclusively used as a mortuary. It is located in the West Side Historic District, but is listed as a non-contributing property. It remains family-owned and continues to operate.
