= Ira C. Copley =

American politician and utility tycoon (1864–1947)

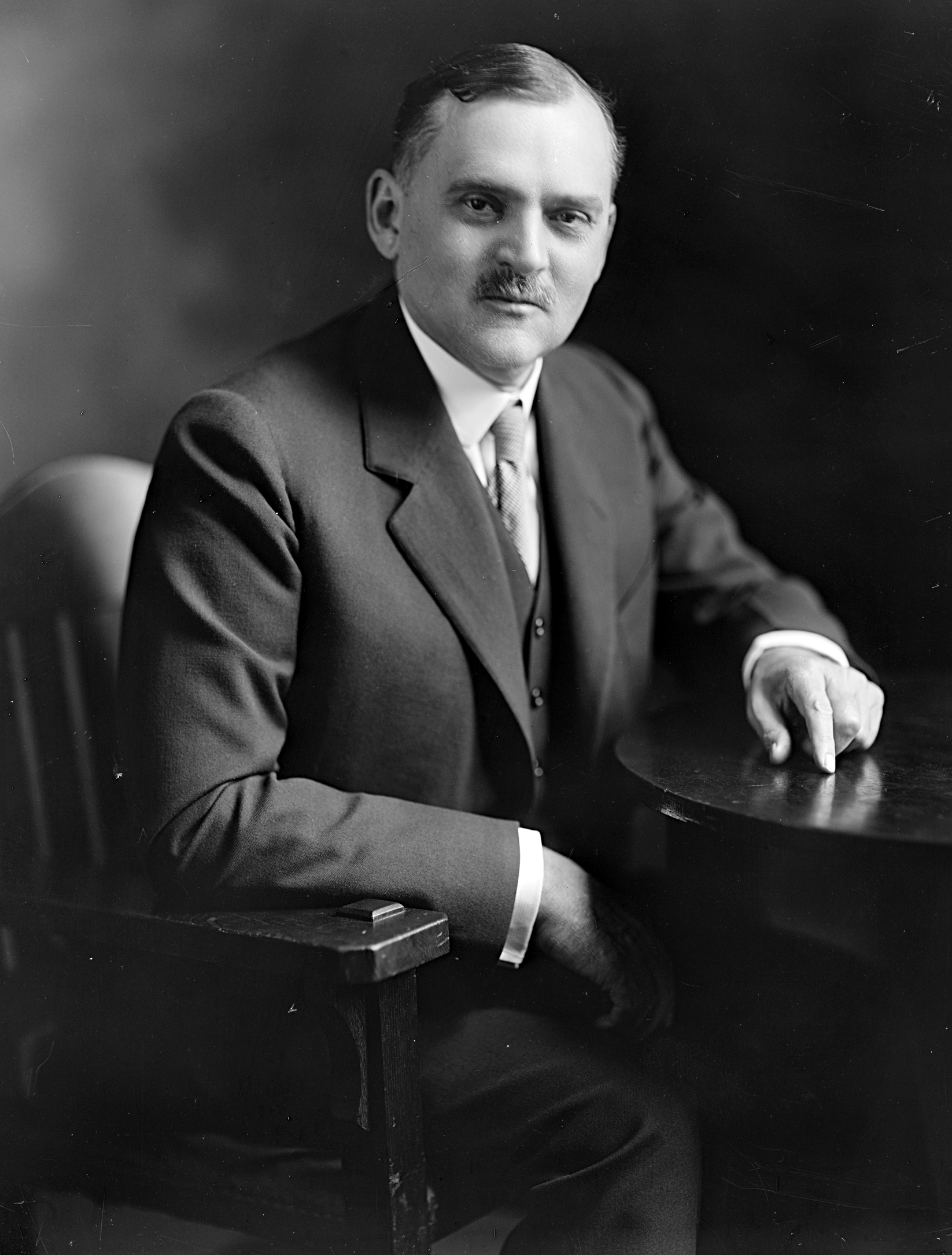
- Copley, 1905–1945

Member of the U.S. House of Representatives from Illinois's 11th district
- In office March 4, 1911 – March 3, 1923
- Preceded by: Howard M. Snapp
- Succeeded by: Frank R. Reid

Personal details
- Born: October 25, 1864 Copley Township, Knox County, Illinois, US
- Died: November 2, 1947 (aged 83) Aurora, Illinois, US
- Party: Republican; Progressive (1915–1917)
- Spouse(s): Edith Straker (1892–1929); Chloe (Davidson) Warley (1931–1947)
- Relations: Richard H. Whiting (uncle)
- Children: James S. and William (both adopted)
- Education: Yale College; Union College of Law
- Occupation: Publisher and utilities magnate
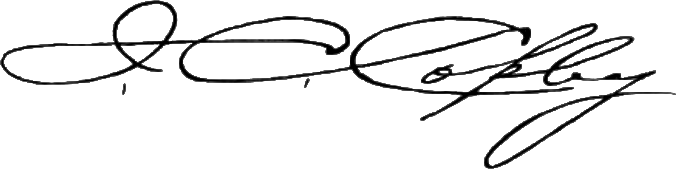
- Signature

Ira Clifton Copley (October 25, 1864 – November 2, 1947) was an American publisher, politician, and utility tycoon. From 1911 to 1923, he served 6 consecutive terms in the U.S. House of Representatives

== Life ==
Born in rural Knox County, Illinois, Copley's family moved to Aurora when Copley was 2 so he could be treated for scarlet fever. After graduating from Yale College and the Union College of Law in Chicago, Copley assumed management of the Aurora Gas Light Company. He successfully guided the company into a regional utilities giant, eventually merging his assets into the Western Utility Corporation, which he sold in 1926.

Copley purchased his first newspaper in 1905, eventually amassing over two dozen papers as Copley Press. He was a Republican and was elected to the United States House of Representatives in 1911, where he served until 1923. From 1915 to 1917, he represented his district as a Progressive. Copley was defeated in a primary in 1922. He is the namesake of the Old Copley Hospital in Aurora, IL, built in 1880, originally named the City Hospital of Aurora. It was re-named in 1937 Copley Memorial Hospital when Mr. Copley donated $2 million toward an expansion. A new hospital was built in 1995 about 3 miles southwest of the old hospital and was named the Rush–Copley Medical Center. His adopted sons James S. and William went on to notable careers in business and art, respectively.

== Biography ==
Ira Clifton Copley was born on October 25, 1864, in Copley Township, Knox County, Illinois, south of Altona. He was the son of Ellen Madeleine (née Whiting) and farmer Ira Birdsall Copley, for whom the township was named. At the age of two, Copley contracted scarlet fever, prompting his family to move east to Aurora, Illinois to see an eye specialist. Copley regained his sight around the age of six, though he struggled with vision problems for the rest of his life. In the meantime, his father became a prominent Aurora citizen, managing the Aurora Gas Light Company. Copley graduated from high school in 1881, then attended Jennings Seminary. Graduating in 1883, he then matriculated at Yale College, where he graduated in 1887. He then studied law for two years at the Union College of Law, but dropped out before graduating.

By this time, his father's gas company was struggling. Although he had recently been admitted to the bar in Illinois, Copley decided to return to Aurora to assume management. Copley shifted the focus of the company from illumination to selling gas as a fuel. The company saw great success and Copley used the profits to purchase competing gas companies. In 1905, he merged his companies into the Western United Gas & Electric Company. Copley would continue to expand the operation for the next twenty years. In 1914, he organized a coal and coke company, then consolidated the two organizations in the Western Utility Corporation in 1921. He sold his interest in the company to investment firms Rollins & Sons and Fitkin & Co. in 1926.

At the same time as his rising success as an industrialist, Copley took an interest in publishing. He purchased the Aurora Beacon in 1905 and later purchased papers in Elgin and Joliet. After selling the Western Utility Corporation, Copley purchased twenty-four newspapers in Southern California for $7.5 million. He managed these publishing holdings as Copley Press, Inc. and was its first president, serving until 1942. He integrated his Illinois publishing interests into the company in 1939. Copley focused on cities that had only one publisher, with the exception his San Diego, California, holdings purchased from the estate of John D. Spreckels. Unlike his contemporaries, Copley took little interest in the politics of his papers and insisted that local managers write impartially.

Copley enlisted as a private, Company "B" 3rd Regiment in the Illinois National Guard in 1880. He was promoted to captain of Company "I" in 1893, then the next year was promoted to Lieutenant Colonel & Inspector of Rifle Practice for the full brigade. He served in this capacity until 1899.

Despite political independence in his papers, Copley led an active political life. In 1894, he was named a member of the Illinois Republican State Central Committee, the state Republican Party organization, where he served for four years. He was the organization's Chairman of the Finance Committee for two of those years. He was also elected President of the Illinois League of Republican Clubs in 1896, declining re-election in 1898. He was appointed to the Illinois Park Commission in 1894, serving four years. Copley was an aide, also known as an Illinois Colonel, to Governor Charles S. Deneen during his eight-year term starting in 1905. Copley was tasked with constructing a new Illinois State Penitentiary in 1909, which he oversaw until 1926.

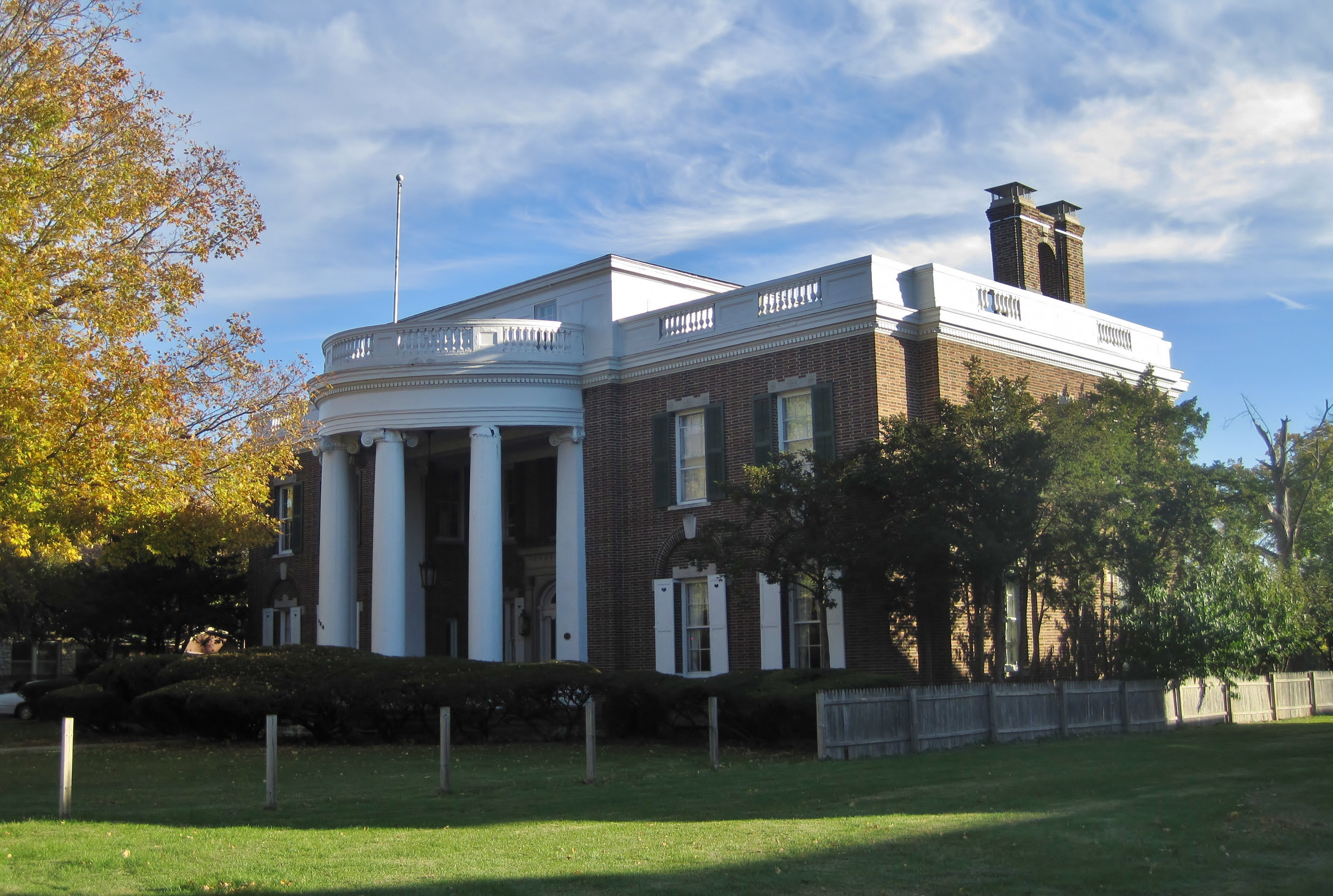
Jarvis Hunt designed Copley's 1917 mansion in Aurora, now on the National Register of Historic Places.

In 1910, he campaigned for Howard M. Snapp's former seat in Illinois's 11th congressional district of the United States House of Representatives. He successfully defeated his Democratic opponent. He was re-elected two years later. In 1914, Copley aligned with Theodore Roosevelt's Progressive (Bull Moose) Party and was one of five Representatives elected from the party. With the party disintegrating by the end of his term, Copley, returned to the Republican Party in 1916. He represented his district until 1922, when he was defeated in a primary election by Frank R. Reid. His uncle Richard H. Whiting had also served in the House of Representatives (1875–1877).

Copley continued his publishing aspirations after leaving Congress, purchasing Springfield's Illinois State Journal in 1927, favoring its pro-Republican stance. Copley attempted to buy the Illinois State Register, the Journal's Democratic-oriented competitor, at the same time. That effort failed, and the two newspapers engaged in nearly 15 years of circulation battles, with the Register focused on city circulation and the Journal seeking subscribers throughout the Springfield area. In 1942, however, Copley tried again to buy the Register. This time, he was successful, although he also promised that the Register could keep its independent editorial voice. The two papers were merged in 1974 into The State Journal-Register.

In 1928, Copley consolidated the San Diego Union and San Diego Tribune into The San Diego Union-Tribune. Later that year, Senator George W. Norris accused Copley Press of receiving money from public utility companies. Copley initially denied owning any power company stock, but subsequently, testifying before the Federal Trade Commission in June 1929, disavowed the previous statement and showed that he was in the process of selling the last of $8.8 million in public utility stock he had held.

=== Personal life ===
Copley married Edith Straker in March 1892. They adopted two sons: James Strohn, who became president of Copley Press in 1947, and William Nelson, who became a prominent artist. Edith died in 1929; in 1931, Copley married Chloe (née Warley) Davidson. He was named to the board of directors of the Aurora Public Library in 1890. From 1892 to 1897, he served on the board of trustees of the Jennings Seminary. He joined Freemasonry in 1889 and the Knights of Pythias in 1890. In his free time, he enjoyed traveling. Copley donated over $2 million to the Aurora City Hospital in 1937 to fund a new campus; originally dedicated as Copley Memorial Hospital, it is now known as the Rush–Copley Medical Center. Copley died on November 2, 1947, and was buried in Spring Lake Cemetery in Aurora. Bishop William W. Horstick proceeded over the service. Copley still managed seventeen newspapers at the time of his death. His former residence in Aurora, the Col. Ira C. Copley Mansion, is listed on the National Register of Historic Places.

U.S. House of Representatives
Preceded by Howard Snapp	Member of the U.S. House of Representatives from Illinois's 11th congressional district 1911–1923	Succeeded by Frank R. Reid
