= Richard H. Whiting =

American politician (1826–1888)

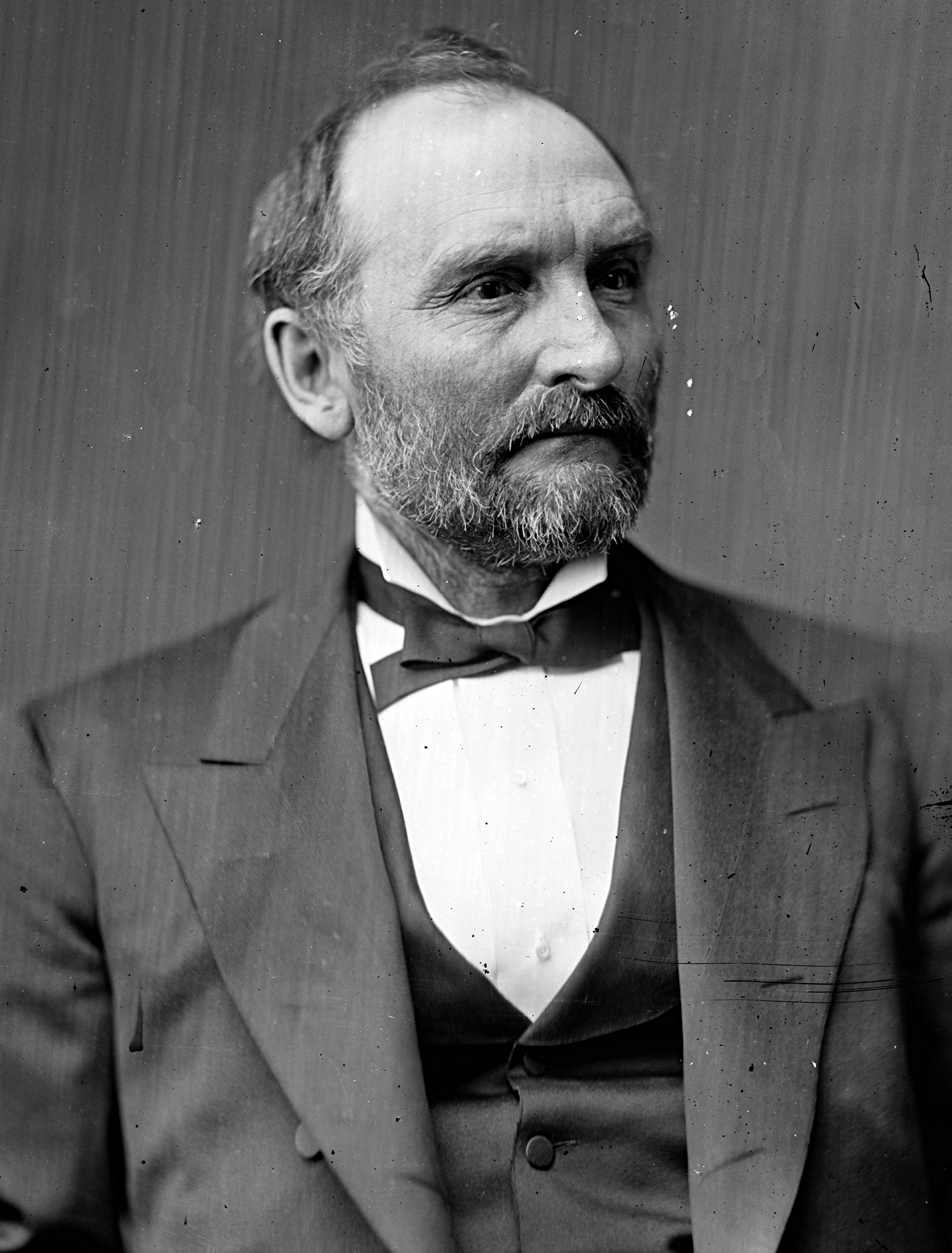

Member of the U.S. House of Representatives from Illinois's 9th district
- In office March 4, 1875 – March 3, 1877
- Preceded by: Granville Barrere
- Succeeded by: Thomas A. Boyd

Personal details
- Born: January 17, 1826 West Hartford, Connecticut
- Died: May 24, 1888 (aged 62) New York City, New York
- Party: Republican

Richard Henry Whiting (January 17, 1826 – May 24, 1888) was a U.S. representative from Illinois. He was the uncle of Rep. Ira Clifton Copley, and the grandfather of composer Richard A. Whiting.

Born in West Hartford, Connecticut, Whiting attended the common schools. He moved to Altona, Illinois, in 1850, thence to Galesburg, Illinois, in 1860, where he built a gas works. During the Civil War he served in the Union Army as paymaster of Volunteers 1862-1866. He was appointed assessor of internal revenue for the fifth district of Illinois in February 1870, serving until May 20, 1873, when the office was abolished. He was appointed collector of internal revenue for the same district May 20, 1873, with office at Peoria, Illinois, and served until his resignation on March 4, 1875, having been elected to Congress.

Whiting was elected as a Republican to the Forty-fourth Congress (March 4, 1875 - March 3, 1877). He was not a candidate for renomination in 1876. He served as delegate to the Republican National Convention in 1884. He died in New York City, May 24, 1888. He was interred in Springdale Cemetery, Peoria, Illinois.

U.S. House of Representatives
Preceded by Granville Barrere	Member of the U.S. House of Representatives from Illinois's 9th congressional district 1875 – 1877	Succeeded by Thomas A. Boyd
