= New Market, Ohio =

Unincorporated community in Ohio, U.S.

Coordinates: 39°08′07″N 83°40′08″W

New Market is an unincorporated community in Highland County, in the U.S. state of Ohio.

== History ==
The first settlement at New Market was made in 1797; the community was named after New Market, Virginia. A post office called New Market was established in 1803, and remained in operation until 1907.
