= William Copley (artist) =

American artist and gallerist (1919–1996)

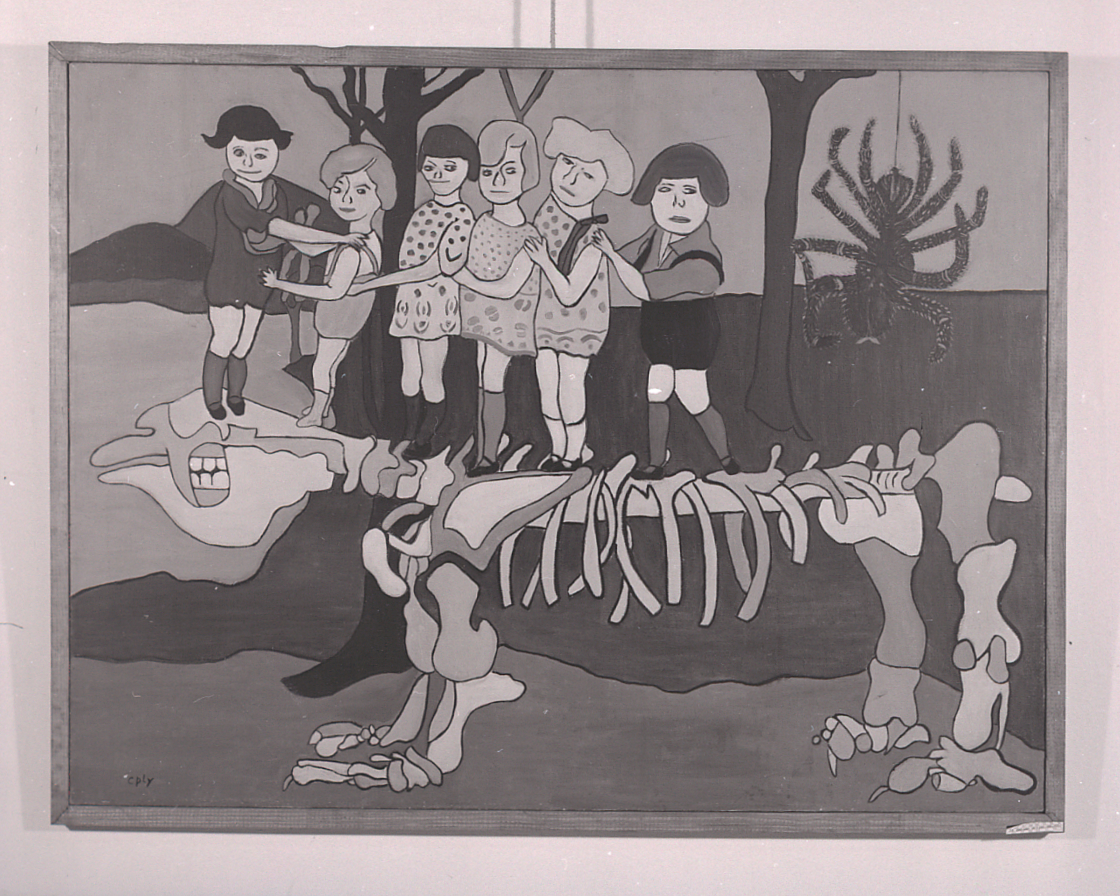
Painting by William N. Copley (photo by Paolo Monti, 1960)

William N. Copley (January 24, 1919 – May 7, 1996) also known as CPLY, was an American painter, writer, gallerist, collector, patron, publisher and art entrepreneur. His works as an artist have been classified as late Surrealist and precursory to Pop art.

== Early life and introduction to art ==
Copley was born in New York City in 1919 to parents John and Flora Lodwell; they died shortly after in the 1919 Spanish Flu epidemic. Copley was adopted in 1921 by Ira C. Copley, the owner of sixteen newspaper companies in Chicago and San Diego. Ira C. Copley remarried after the death of his wife, Edith, several years after the adoption took place. The three lived in Aurora, Illinois, until Copley was ten years old whereby the family moved to Coronado Island, California.

Copley was sent to Phillips Andover and then Yale University by his adopted parents. He was drafted in the Second World War in the middle of his education at Yale, a decision negotiated by the school and the army. Copley experimented with politics upon returning home from the war, working as a reporter for his father's newspaper.

By 1946, Copley met and married Marjorie Doris Wead, the daughter of a test pilot for the Navy. Doris's sister was married to John Ployardt, a Canadian-born animator and narrator at Walt Disney Studios. Copley and Ployardt soon became friends and Ployardt began introducing Copley to painting and Surrealism. The two traveled to Mexico and New York, discovering art, meeting the artists behind the works, and grasping Surrealist ideas. It was during this time that Copley and Ployardt decided to open a gallery in Los Angeles to exhibit Surrealist works.

== Galleries and foundation ==
Copley and Ployardt tracked down Man Ray while living in Los Angeles. Ray then introduced them to Marcel Duchamp in New York City. There, Duchamp opened many doors for them, introducing the two to New York dealers in Surrealism. In 1948, Copley and Ployardt opened The Copley Galleries in Beverly Hills, displaying works by artists including René Magritte, Max Ernst, Yves Tanguy, Roberto Matta, Joseph Cornell, and Man Ray. However, Los Angeles had not yet caught on to the Surrealist scene as other locations such as New York City had done, and the Copley Galleries faced hardships in gaining popularity and sales. Copley painted part-time during the gallery's running from the encouragement of friends Duchamp and Ernst and worked on painting full-time when the gallery closed after its first year.

Copley moved to Paris in 1949–50, leaving behind his wife and two children to continue to paint. During his time in Paris, he remained in Surrealist circles and continued to paint with a uniquely American style. Man Ray introduced him to Noma Rathner, whom he married in 1954. Man Ray took numerous portraits of the Copleys and served as best man at their wedding in Paris. Their home in Longpont-sur-Orge in the outskirts of Paris became a central gathering place in the postwar era for a community of Surrealists to reunite after their dispersal during the war.

The Copleys developed the William and Noma Copley Foundation, later known as the Cassandra Collection, in 1953 with the funds from his father's inheritance. The board, in which Marcel Duchamp was also an adviser, gave small grants to artists and musicians. Upon Duchamp's death in 1968, the William and Noma Copley Foundation (later the Cassandra Foundation) gave Marcel Duchamp's last work, "Etant Donnés" to the Philadelphia Museum of Art, where it is still on view.

=== Collecting ===
From the time of the Copley Galleries until his death, Copley amassed a large collection of artworks with an emphasis on Surrealist works. The basis of his collection started when he began purchasing works that did not sell at the Copley Galleries. From there, he amassed monumental works including Man Ray's "A l'Heure de l'Observatoire – Les Amoureux." Copley's collection was sold at auction in 1979 for $6.7 million, at the time the highest total for the auction of a single owner's collection in the United States.

== Artwork and exhibitions ==
Copley's first exhibition took place in Los Angeles in 1951 at Royer's Book Shop. From there Copley participated in numerous solo and group exhibitions worldwide. In 1961, Copley was given an exhibition in Amsterdam by the Stedelijk Museum. The museum became the first public institution to add a Copley to their collection.

Copley's paintings throughout the 1950s and 60s dealt with ironic and humorous images of stereotypical American symbols like the Western saloon, cowboys, and pin-up girls combined with flags. His works during this period were often considered a combination of American and Mexican folk art and melded in well with the new young POP movement occurring in America when he returned to New York in the 1960s. Artists like Andy Warhol, Christo, Roy Lichtenstein and many others were frequent visitors at Copley's studio on Lower Broadway. Copley believed that pop art had always interested him, claiming American pop art had much to do with "self-disgust" and "satire."

=== The Letter Edged in Black Press (SMS) ===
In 1967, after a divorce with his second wife, Noma, Copley and new friend Dmitri Petrov decided to publish portfolios of 20th-century artist collaborations with the abbreviation SMS (for "Shit Must Stop"). Copley's Upper West Side loft became a meeting place for performers, artists, curators, and composers to work together on the open-ended collective. The SMS portfolio contained six volumes, each of which were shipped out from the artists to subscribers. The works included came from artists both well-renowned and obscure, including Marcel Duchamp, Roy Lichtenstein, Man Ray, Christo, Richard Hamilton, Claes Oldenburg, John Cage, Terry Riley, La Monte Young, Dick Higgins, Ronnie Landfield, Bruce Nauman, Meret Oppenheim, Neil Jenney, Yoko Ono and others.

=== CPLY X-Rated ===
Copley's works in the 1970s focused on his own understating of differences and challenges between men and women in romantic and sexual relationships. His works were now erotic, even pornographic. In 1974 he exhibited these new works at what was then the New York Cultural Center in Columbus Circle, New York in a show titled "CPLY X-Rated." These pieces were a sudden change from his previous romantic whimsical periods. The American public had difficulty with the material, for which Copley expressed, "Americans... don't know the difference between eroticism and pornography. Because eroticism has always existed in art. And pornography has never necessarily been in art." Copley's experienced greater feedback in Europe, where the work was then well received. In conjunction with the New York Cultural Center Show, there was a special "CPLY X-Rated Poster and Catalog.

== Later years ==
Copley moved to Roxbury, Connecticut in 1980, where he built a studio and spent time among friends. In 1992 he moved full-time to Key West, Florida, due to health issues and lived with his sixth and final wife, Cynthia Gooch. He died on May 7, 1996, at age 77 from complications from a stroke he had suffered three weeks earlier.

Mr. Copley's first five marriages ended in divorce. He had a son and two daughters. His daughter, Claire S. Copley, founded the short-lived, but influential Claire Copley Gallery, which exhibited important works by Michael Asher and Bas Jan Ader. His son was also an artist who went by the name Billy Bryant to distinguish himself from his father. Billy designed the cover art for Terry Riley's 1968 album In C.

== Selected solo exhibitions ==
- 2022 "Works on Paper", Galerie Max Hetzler, Berlin
- 2022 Sadie Coles HQ, London
- 2020 "The Ballad of William N. Copley", Galerie Max Hetzler, Berlin
- 2020 "The New York Years", Kasmin, New York
- 2020 "William N. Copley: The Temptation of St. Anthony (Revisited)", Nino Mier, Los Angeles
- 2020 "William N. Copley: Drawings and Paintings 1966–1991", Nino Mier, Los Angeles
- 2018 "William N. Copley: The Coffin They Carry You Off In", Institute of Contemporary Art (ICA), Miami
- 2018 "Publishing the Portable Museum: William N. Copley’s The Letter Edged in Black Press", Alden Projects, New York
- 2017 "William N. Copley: Women", Kasmin Gallery, New York (catalogue)

h*2016 "William N. Copley: The World According to CPLY", The Menil Collection, Houston (travelled to Fondazione Prada, Milan)

- 2016 "The World According to CPLY", The Menil Collection, Houston
- 2015 Galerie 1900–2000, Paris
- 2015 "William N. Copley: Drawings (1962 – 1973)", Kasmin Gallery, New York
- 2015 "William N. Copley: Paintings from 1960 – 1994", Showroom by Paul van Esch & Partners Art Advisory, Amsterdam
- 2014 "William N. Copley: Paintings and Mirrors", Michael Fuchs Galerie, Berlin
- 2013 "Finally We Laugh", Galerie Linn Lühn, Düsseldorf (catalogue)
- 2013 "William Copley & Big Fat Black Cock", Inc. Gang Bust, Venus Over Manhattan, New York (catalogue)
- 2012 "Patriotism of CPLY and All That", Kasmin Gallery, New York
- 2012 "William N. Copley: Works 1948 – 1983", Galerie Von Braunbehrens, Munich (catalogue)
- 2012 Museum Frieder Burda, Baden Baden
- 2011 "X-Rated," Sadie Coles HQ, London
- 2010 "CPLY: X-Rated," Paul Kasmin Gallery, New York
- 2004 Musée d'Art Moderne et Contemporain
- 1980–81 Badischer Kunstverein, Karlsruhe, Germany
  - Stedelijk Van Abbemuseum, Eindhoven, The Netherlands (traveling retrospective)
  - Musée National d'Art Moderne, Centre Georges Pompidou, Paris
  - Kunsthalle Bern
- 1979 "CPLY: Reflections on a Past Life," Institute of the Arts, Rice University, Houston
- 1974 "CPLY/X-RATED," New York Cultural Center, New York

== Selected group exhibitions ==
=== 1953 ===
- Americans in Paris, Galerie Arthur Craven, Paris, France

=== 1956 ===
- XII Salon de Mai, Musee D’Art Moderne de la Ville de Paris, Paris, France
- Exposition Internationale de l’Art Actuel, Nagaoka Museum, Nagoaka, Japan

=== 1957 ===
- Verzameling Urvater, (Urvater Collection), Rijksmuseum Kröller-Müller, Otterlo, Netherlands; The Museum and Art Gallery, Leicester, England; City of York Gallery, York, England; The Tate Gallery, London, England
- Picture Fair, Institute of Contemporary Arts, London, England

=== 1959 ===
- XV Salon de Mai, Musée D’Art Moderne de la Ville de Paris, Paris, France
- Exposition Internationale du Surréalisme, Galerie Daniel Cordier, Paris, France
- The Maremont Collection at the Institute of Design, Illinois Institute of Technology at Crown Hall, Chicago
- Picture Fair, Institute of Contemporary Arts, London, England

=== 1960 ===
- International Surrealist Exhibition, D’arcy Galleries, New York

=== 1961 ===
- XVII Salon de Mai, Musée D’Art Moderne de la Ville de Paris, Paris, France
- Bewogen Bewgin (Moving Movement), Stedelijk Museum, Amsterdam Holland; Rörelse I Konsten (Object in Motion) Moderna Museet, Stockholm, Sweden; Bevagelse i kunsten (Movement in Art), Louisiana Museum, Humlbaek, Denmark
- Contemporary Modern Paintings Drawings Collages Objets-Peinture Sculpture Property of The American Chess Foundation, Parke-Bernet Galleries, New York
- Sculpture and Picture Fair, Institute of Contemporary Arts, London, England
- Surréalisme Et Précurseurs, Palais Graneville, Besançon, France

=== 1962 ===
- Collage out of California, Pasadena Art Museum, Pasadena
- Antagonismes 2: L’Objet, Musée D’Art Decoratifs, Palais du Louvre – Pavillon de Marsan, Pavillon de Marsan, Paris, France
- Surrealismus: Phantastiche Maleri der Gegenwart, Künstlerhaus, Vienna, Austria
- XVIII Salon de Mai, Musée D’Art Moderne de la Ville de Paris, Paris, France
- Esther-Robles Gallery, Los Angeles
- Picture Fair, Institute of Contemporary Arts, London, England
- Piccola Biennale, Palazzo Papadopoli, Venice, Italy

=== 1963 ===
- Pop Art USA, Oakland Museum of Art, Oakland, California
- XIX Salon de Mai, Musée D’Art Moderne de la Ville de Paris, Paris, France
- 18 Salon de Réalitiés Nouvelles, Musée Municipal D’Art Moderne, Paris, France
- Paris Lettriste, Galerie Schmidt, Paris, France
- Aspetti dell’Arte Contemporanea, L’Aquila Castello Cinquecentesco, L’Aquila, Italy
- Surrealist Exhibition, Galerie Carpenter, Paris, France; New York

=== 1964 ===
- Arte Fantastica, Museo de Castillo di San Giusto, Trieste, Italy
- Selections from the L.M. Asher Collection, University Art Gallery, University of New Mexico, Albuquerque
- New Directions in American Painting, Rose Art Museum, Brandeis University, Waltham
- Nieuwe Realisten, Haags Gemeentemuseum, The Hague, Netherlands
- Le Surrealisme: Sources, Histoire, Affinities, Galerie Charpentier, Paris, France
- Around Travel, P.V.I. Gallery, New York
- May Twelfth Twelve Artists, Alexander Iolas Gallery, New York
- 100 American Drawings, Byron Gallery, New York

=== 1965 ===
- The Maremont Collection, Washington Gallery of Modern Art, Washington, D.C.
- Pop Art, Nouveau Réalisme, Etc., Palais Des Beaux-Arts, Brussels, Belgium
- Surrealist Exhibition, Byron Gallery, New York
- Visiting Artists at the Tamarind Lithography Workshop, Otis Art Institute, Los Angeles
- Arena of Love, Dwan Gallery, Los Angeles
- Whence Pop, Heckscher Museum of Art, Huntington, New York
- The Box Show, Byron Gallery, New York
- Exquisite Torsi, David Stuart Galleries, Los Angeles
- Drawings, Alexander Iolas Gallery, New York
- Recent Acquisitions of Painting and Sculpture, Museum of Modern Art, New York

=== 1966 ===
- Hommage á Caissa: Exhibition for the Chess Foundation of the Duchamp Fund, Cordier & Ekstrom Gallery, New York
- Dada Lever, Moderna Museet, Stockholm, Sweden
- Surrealist Exhibition, University of California, Santa Barbara
- Portraits: Peinture, Galerie Claude Bernard, Paris, France
- 25 Years of Art in San Diego, La Jolla Museum of Art, La Jolla, California
- Birthday Party for George Washington, Henri Gallery, Alexandria, Virginia
- 26th Annual Exhibition by the Society for Contemporary American Art, Art Institute of Chicago, Chicago
- Limited Works by Important Artists, The Egg and The Eye, Los Angeles
- Around the Automobile, Museum of Modern Art, New York; Arlington State College, Arlington; Cedar Rapids Art Center, Cedar Rapids, Iowa; Hopkins Center for the Arts at Dartmouth College, Hanover, New Hampshire; B. Caroll Reece Memorial Museum, Johnson City, Tennessee; Bates College, Lewiston, Maine; Davison Art Center at Wesleyan University, Middletown, Connecticut; Brooks Memorial Art Gallery, Memphis, Tennessee; The Cranbrook Academy of Art, Bloomfield Hills, Michigan

=== 1967 ===
- Mixed Masters, University of St. Thomas, Houston
- Angry Arts: Artists and Writers Protest Against the War in Vietnam, Associated American Artists, New York
- Fifty American Artists of the Twentieth Century, North Shore Community Arts Center, Great Neck, New York
- 27th Annual Exhibition by the Society for Contemporary American Art, Art Institute of Chicago, Chicago

=== 1968 ===
- The Obsessive Image, Institute of Contemporary Arts, London, England
- Dada, Surrealism, and Their Heritage, Museum of Modern Art, New York; Los Angeles County Museum of Art, Los Angeles; Art Institute of Chicago, Chicago
- Language II, Dwan Gallery, New York

=== 1969 ===
- Blocked Metaphors, Cordier & Ekstrom Gallery, New York

=== 1970 ===
- Recent Acquisitions of Painting and Sculpture, Museum of Modern Art, New York
- Copley, Brauner and Magritte, Louisiana Gallery, Houston
- Box Top Art, Illinois State University, Bloomington

=== 1972 ===
- Documenta 5, Kassel, Germany

=== 1973 ===
- Erotic Art, The Art Center of the New School for Social Research, New York

=== 1974 ===
- Seventy-First American Exhibition, Art Institute of Chicago, Chicago

=== 1975 ===
- Three Generations of the American Nude, New York Cultural Center, New York
- University of Houston/Fine Art Center, Houston

=== 1976 ===
- The William Seitz Memorial Exhibition, Princeton University Art Museum, Princeton

=== 1977 ===
- Artist’s Renderings of Paintings, Pinoetca di Brera, Milan, Italy; Musée du Louvre, Paris France
- The Dada / Surrealist Heritage, Sterling and Francine Clark Art Institute, Williamstown, Massachusetts

=== 1978 ===
- “Bad” Painting, The New Museum, New York
- American Nude, Harold Reed Gallery, New York
- Box Museum, Cooper Hewitt Museum, New York

=== 1980 ===
- American Painting of the Sixties and Seventies: The Real, The Ideal, and the Fantastic, Whitney Museum of Art, New York; Montgomery Museum of Fine Arts, Montgomery, Alabama; Joslyn Art Museum; Omaha; Museum of Fine Arts, St. Petersburg, Florida; Columbus Museum of Art, Columbus, Ohio; Colorado Springs Fine Arts Center, Colorado Springs; The Sierra Nevada Museum of Art, Reno
- The Figurative Tradition and the Whitney Museum of Art, Whitney Museum of Art, New York

=== 1981 ===
- Westkunst, Museen Der Stadt Köln, Cologne, Germany

=== 1982 ===
- Documenta 7, Kassel, Germany
- The Erotic Impulse, Roger Litz Gallery, New York

=== 1983 ===
- Looking at Women, Artemisia Gallery, Chicago, Illinois
- Festival of the Arts, Muhlenberg College, Allentown, Pennsylvania
- Contemporary Paintings from the Weatherspoon Art Gallery, University of North Carolina at Greensboro, Greensboro, North Carolina
- The Last Laugh, Southern Ohio Museum and Cultural Center, Portsmouth, Ohio

=== 1984 ===
- Auto and Culture, Museum of Contemporary Art, Los Angeles; Detroit Institute of Arts, Detroit
- Paravents, Schloss Lorsfeld, Kerpen, Germany

=== 1985 – 1986 ===
- Cinquante Ans de Dessins Americans: 1930-1980, École nationale supérieure des Beaux-Arts, Paris, France; Städtische Galerie im Stadelschen Kunstinstitut; Frankfurt, Germany

=== 1986 ===
- Column, Galerie Jule Kewenig, Frechen-Bachem, Germany
- Europa / Amerika: die Geschicte einer kunstlerischen Faszination seit 1940, Museum Ludwig, Germany
- Line Drives, Gallery 53/Smithy Artworks, Cooperstown, New York

=== 1987 ===
- The Amused Eye: A National Sampling of Humor in Art, The Evanston Art Center, Evanston, Illinois

=== 1988 ===
- Gran Pavese, The Flag Project, Muhka Museum Voor Hedendaagse Kunst Antwerp, Antwerp, Belgium
- Roger Brown, William Copley, Duncan Hannah, Gloria Luria Gallery, Miami

=== 1989 ===
- Bilderstreit: Widerspruch, Einheit und Fragment in der Kunst seit 1960, Museum Ludwig in den Reinhallen der Kölner Messe, Cologne, Germany

=== 1992 ===
- My Father’s House Has Many Mansions, Phyllis Kind Gallery, New York

=== 1993 ===
- Darkness and Light: Twentieth-Century Works from Texas Collections, Blaffer Gallery, The Art Museum of Houston, Houston

=== 1994 ===
- Old Glory: The American Flag in Contemporary Art, Cleveland Center for Contemporary Art, Cleveland

=== 1995 ===
- Bunnies – A Group Show, Nolan / Eckman Gallery, New York
- Drawing the Line: Reappraising Drawings Past and Present, Southampton City Art Gallery, Southampton, England; Manchester City Art Gallery, Manchester, England; Ferens Art Gallery, Hull, England; Whitechapel Art Gallery, London, England

=== 1996 ===
- A Labor of Love, The New Museum, New York
- Bilder – Aquarelle – Zeichnungen, Galerie Fred Jahn, Munich, Germany
- Hommage a Copley, Galerie Fred Jahn, Munich, Germany
- Think, Galerie Brigitte Ihsen, Cologne, Germany
- Disegni Americani degli anni ottanta: 15 artisti, Galleria Milano, Milan, Italy

=== 1997 ===
- Magie der Zahl in der Kunst des 20, Jahrhunderts, Staatsgalerie, Stuttgart, Germany

=== 1998 ===
- Summer Group Show, Nolan / Eckman Gallery, New York
- Then and Now and Later: Art at Yale Since 1945, Yale University Art Gallery, New Haven, Connecticut
- Imagined World, David Nolan Gallery, New York

=== 1999 ===
- Bad-bad: That is a good excuse, Staatliche Kunsthalle Baden-Baden, Baden-Baden, Germany

=== 2000 ===
- Prints, Nolan / Eckman Gallery, New York
- Im Gegenüber: Landschaften, Stilleben, Portraits, Galerie Von Braunbehrens, Munich, Germany
- Sweet Dreams and Nightmares: Dada and Surrealism from the Rosalnd and Melvin Jacobs Collection, Museum of Contemporary Art North Miami, Miami

=== 2001 ===
- Kunst Sammeln I: Werke Zeitgenössischer Kunst aus den Sammlungen von Cramm, Faklckenburg, Kalkmann, Kunstverein Bad Salzdetfurth, Bodenburg, Germany
- Museum Unserer Wunsche, Museum Ludwig, Cologne, Germany

=== 2003 ===
- Imagine: Selections from the Permanent Collection, Museum of Contemporary Art North Miami, Miami

=== 2004 ===
- Funny Cuts: Cartoons und Comics in der Zeitgenössische Kunst, Staatsgalerie, Stuttgart, Germany
- Eröffnungsausstellung Sammlung Frieder Burda, Staatliche Kunsthalle Baden-Baden, Baden-Baden, Germany
- Christmas Art Gifts, Artiscope, Brussels, Belgium
- Baume, Galerie Biedermann, Munich, Germany

=== 2005 ===
- International Zeichner, Galerie Biedermann, Munich, Germany
- Bilderwechsel III: Amerikanische Maleri, Museum Frieder Burda, Baden-Baden, Germany

=== 2006 ===
- Die anderen Bilder, Museum Der Stadt, Ratingen, Germany
- Ele-Mental, David Nolan Gallery, New York
- Six Feed Under: Autopsie unseres Umgangs mit Toten, Kunstmuseum Bern, Bern, Switzerland
- Models and Prototypes, Mildred Lane Kemper Art Museum, St. Louis, Missouri
- L’Amateur D’Estampes, Musée des Beaux-Arts, Tourcoing, France
- Collage Effect, 1301PE, Los Angeles, California
- Group Exhibition, David Nolan Gallery, New York

=== 2007 ===
- Rockers Island: Olbricht Collection, Museum Folkwang, Essen, Germany
- Deutsche und Amerikanische Maleri, Museum Frieder Burda, Baden-Baden, Germany
- Sixties! Art, Fashion, Design Film and Photography, Gemeentemuseum Den Haag, The Hague, Netherlands
- Affinities, Deutsche Guggenheim, Berlin, Germany

=== 2008 ===
- Diana und Aktaion: Der Verbotene Blick auf die Nacktheit, Museum Kunst Palest, Düsseldorf, Germany
- Karl Bohrmann – William N. Copley, Galerie Klauss Gerrit Friese, Stuttgart, Germany
- Carte Blanche III – Gedichte der Fakten, Galerie Fur Zeitgenössische Kunst, Leipzig, Germany
- Liebe, Love, Paare, Gustäve-Lübcke-Museum, Hamm, Germany
- Museum Im Kulturspeicher, Würzburg, Germany
- Ulm Museum, Ulm Germany
- Mirror, Mirror, Ed Thorp Gallery, New York

=== 2009 ===
- And Other Essays, Bard College, Annandale-on-Hudson, New York
- Exile On Main St., Bonnefantenmuseum, Maastricht, Netherlands
- Jr. and Son’s, Zach Feuer Gallery, New York
- The Long Arm of Coincidence: Selections from the Rosalind and Melvin Jacobs Collection, Pace MacGill Gallery, New York

=== 2010 ===
- Sixties – Seventies, Galerie 1900–2000, Paris, France
- Intimacy! Bathing in Art, Kunstmuseum Ahlen, Ahlen, Germany
- Permanent Trouble: Sammlung Kopp, Kunstforum Ostdeutsche Galerie Regensburg, Regensburg, Germany

=== 2011 ===
- After Shelly Duval ’72 (Frogs on the High Line), Maccarone Gallery, New York
- Andreas Slominski & William N. Copley – X-Rated, M.E. Collector's Room, Berlin, Germany
- ADAA Art Fair, Paul Kasmin Gallery, New York

=== 2012 ===
- Interiors, Andrew Kreps Gallery, New York

=== 2013 ===
- Re-View, Hauser and Wirth Gallery, London, England
- Gang Bust: William N. Copley & Big Fat Black Cock. Inc, Venus Over Manhattan, New York
- Masculine / Feminine, Michael Fuchs Galerie, Berlin, Germany
- Building the Sukka, House of Gaga, Mexico City, Mexico

=== 2014 ===
- Pop Abstraction, Fredericks and Fraser Gallery and Garth Greenan Gallery, New York
- Purple States, Andrew Edlin Gallery, New York
- Live and Let Die, Modern Art, London, England
- Alexander the Great: The Iolas Gallery 1955 – 1987, Paul Kasmin Gallery, New York
- Art Basel Miami Beach, Sadie Coles HQ, Miami
- The Surrealist Bungalow, Linn Lühn, Düsseldorf, Germany
- What Nerve!: Alternative Figures in American Art, 1960 to the Present, RISD Museum, Providence

=== 2015 ===
- The Violent Crab, David Roberts Art Foundation, London, England
- L’Impasse Ronsin, ADAA Art Fair, Paul Kasmin Gallery, New York
- Viewer Discretion: Children of Bataille, Stux & Haller Gallery, New York
- The Shadow is Taken, Algus Greenspon, New York
- Saul Steinberg and William Copley: Take on the Life, Galerie Klauss Gerrit Friese, Berlin, Germany
- Painting 2.0: Expressions in the Information Age; Museum Brandhorst, Munich, Germany; Mumok Museum, Vienna, Switzerland

=== 2016 ===
- William Copley, Elma Talbot, Ina van Zyl, Galerie Onrust, Amsterdam, The Netherlands
- Olympia, Karma at Galerie Patrick Seguin, Paris, France
- William N. Copley and His Mentor, Magritte, VENUS at FIAC, Gran Palais, Paris, France
- The Revolutionary Suicide Mechanized Band, Rob Tufnell Gallery, Cologne, Germany
- Impasse Ronsin, Paul Kasmin Gallery, New York

=== 2017 ===
- Animal Farm, The Brant Foundation, Greenwich, Connecticut
- Hope and Hazard: A Comedy of Eros, Hall Art Foundation, Reading, Vermont
- Itinéraires, Musée D’Arts de Nantes, Nantes, France
- Schlaf: Eine produktive Zeitverschwendung, Museen Böttcherstrasse, Paula Modersohn-Becker Museum, Bremen, Germany
- An Incomplete History of Protest: Selections from the Whitney’s Collection, 1940 – 2017, Whitney Museum of American Art, New York
- America! America! How real is real?, Museum Frieder Burda, Baden-Baden, Germany

=== 2018 ===
- Kinder Gentler Nation, Karma, New York
- Mr. Natural; And Other Works from the Allan Frumkin Gallery (1952 – 1987), VENUS, New York
- Nudes, Sadie Coles, London, England
- Atlas, Fondazione Prada, Milan, Italy
- Remember to React: 60 Years of Collecting, NSU Art Museum Fort Lauderdale, Fort Lauderdale, Florida
- Trance, Aïshti Foundation, Jal El Dib, Lebanon
- París pese a todo: Artistas extranheros, 1944-1968 (Lost, Loose and Loved: Foreign Artists in Paris, 1944 – 1968), Museo Nacional Centro de Arta Reina Sofia, Madrid, Spain

=== 2019 ===
- Fringe: William N. Copley, Jenny Watson & Saskia Pintelon, Museum Dhondt-Dhaenens, Deurle, Belgium
- Recline: Portraiture & Henri Matisse Prints, McClain Gallery, Houston, Texas

=== 2020 ===
- Valley of Gold: Southern California and the Phantasmagoric, Kasmin, New York
- Karel Appel, André Butzler, William N. Copley, Ida Ekblad, Jeff Elrod, Walton Ford, Tursic & Mille, Galerie Max Hetzler, London, England
- Helmut Newton 100 / William N. Copley 101 / Jonathan Monk 51, Galerie Klaus Gerrit Friese, Berlin, Germany
- Impasse Ronsin. Murder, Love, and Art in the Heart of Paris, Museum Tinguely, Basel, Switzerland

=== 2023 ===
- SEE YOURSELF AS LOVERS SEE YOU: William N. Copley | Dorothy Iannone, Sammlung Philara, Düsseldorf
- The Curatorial Imagination of Walter Hopps, The Menil Collection, Houston, Texas
- Pictures Girls Make: Portraitures, Blum & Poe, Los Angeles

=== 2023–2024 ===
- Paraventi: Folding Screens from the 17th to 21st Centuries, Fondazione Prada, Milan
- 2024
- Americans in Paris: Artists working in Postwar France, 1946–1962, The Grey Art Museum, New York University, New York

== Selected press ==
- Sam, Sherman, "Critics' Pics: William N. Copley at Sadie Coles HQ," Artforum, August 2011.
- Laster, Paul, "William N. Copley, 'X-Rated'," Time Out, 12/03/13.
- Smith, Roberta, "Playing the Renegade With Eroticism or Rage," The New York Times, 11/11/10.

== Museum and public collections ==
- Aargauer Kunsthaus, Aarau
- Allen Memorial Art Museum, Oberlin
- Art Institute of Chicago, Chicago
- Carleton University Art Gallery, Ottawa
- Centre Pompidou, Paris
- Denver Art Museum, Denver
- Destina Foundation, New York
- Falckenberg Collection, Hamburg
- Fondazione Prada, Milan
- Goetz Collection, Munich
- International Centre Of Graphic Arts, Ljubljana
- Israel Museum, Jerusalem
- Lenbachhaus, Munich
- Los Angeles County Museum of Art, Los Angeles
- Maremont Collection, Chicago
- Menil Collection, Houston
- Moderna Museet, Stockholm
- Musée d'art moderne et contemporain, Geneva
- Musée d'art moderne et contemporain, Saint-Etienne
- Musée de l'Art Moderne de la Ville de Paris, Paris
- Museum of Contemporary Art, Chicago, Chicago
- Museum of Contemporary Art, Los Angeles, Los Angeles
- Museum of Contemporary Art, North Miami, Miami
- Museum of Modern Art, New York
- Museum Ludwig, Cologne
- Museum Moderner Kunst Stiftung Ludwig Wien, Vienna
- Museum Ulm, Ulm
- Nagaoka Contemporary Art Museum, Nagaoka
- Newport Harbour Museum, Newport
- Philadelphia Museum of Art, Philadelphia
- Philara Collection, Düsseldorf
- Power Institute of Fine Arts, Sydney
- Princeton University Art Museum, Princeton
- Städel Museum, Frankfurt
- Stedelijk Museum, Amsterdam
- Tate Collection, London
- Whitney Museum of American Art, New York
