= Longpont-sur-Orge =

Commune in Île-de-France, France

- Commune
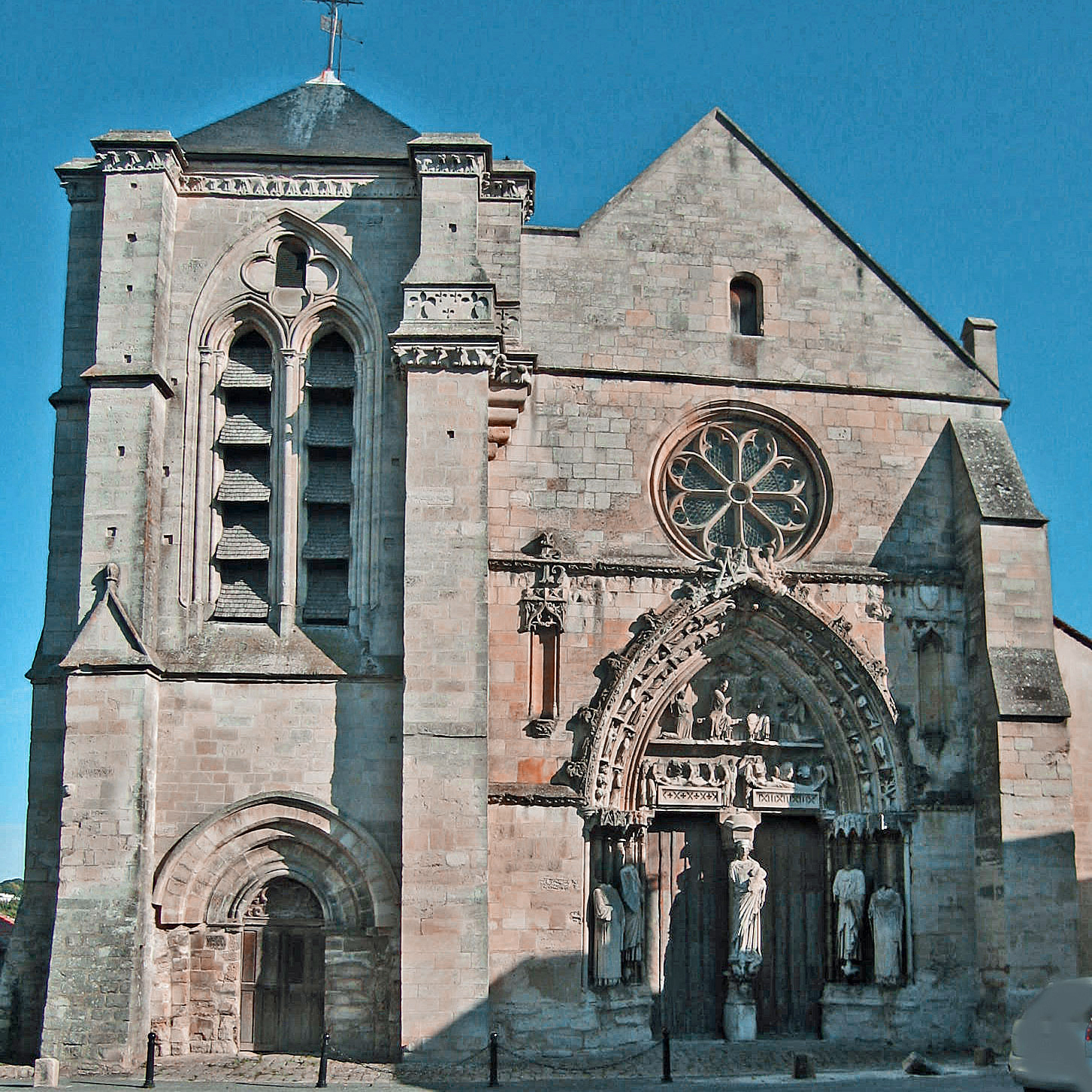
- The basilica of Longpont-sur-Orge

- Coat of arms
- Location of Longpont-sur-Orge
- Location within France Location within Île-de-France (region)
- Coordinates: 48°38′33″N 2°17′34″E
- Country: France
- Region: Île-de-France
- Department: Essonne
- Arrondissement: Palaiseau
- Canton: Brétigny-sur-Orge
- Intercommunality: CA Cœur d'Essonne

Government
  - Mayor (2020–2026): Alain Lamour (DVG)
- Area^{1}: 5.05 km^{2} (1.95 sq mi)
- Highest elevation: 96 m (315 ft)
- Lowest elevation: 37 m (121 ft)
- Population (2023): 6,482
  - Density: 1,280/km^{2} (3,320/sq mi)
- Time zone: UTC+01:00 (CET)
  - Summer (DST): UTC+02:00 (CEST)
- INSEE/Postal code: 91347 /91310
- ^{1} French Land Register data, which excludes lakes, ponds, glaciers > 1 km^{2} (0.386 sq mi or 247 acres) and river estuaries.

Longpont-sur-Orge (French pronunciation: [lɔ̃pɔ̃ syʁ ɔʁʒ], literally Longpont on Orge) is a commune in the Essonne department in Île-de-France in northern France.

From 1954 to 1962, the villa in Longpont-sur-Orge owned by William and Noma Copley served as a social hub and a central gathering place in the postwar era for a community of Surrealists to reunite after their dispersal during the war. Among the artists who frequented the villa located at 27, rue du Docteur Darier were Man Ray, Henri Matisse, Marcel Duchamp, Roland Penrose, Lee Miller, and British architect Maxwell Fry.

Brico Dépôt, a subsidiary of Kingfisher plc, has its head office in Longpont-sur-Orge.

== Population ==
Inhabitants of Longpont-sur-Orge are known as Longipontains in French.

Historical population
Year	Pop.	±% p.a.
1968	1,825	—
1975	3,220	+8.45%
1982	4,120	+3.58%
1990	4,807	+1.95%
1999	5,843	+2.19%
2007	6,609	+1.55%
2012	6,585	−0.07%
2017	6,338	−0.76%
2023	6,482	+0.38%
Source: INSEE

== Education ==
The commune has the following primary school groups, or Groups of preschools (maternelles) and elementary schools: Groupe scolaire de Lormoy, Groupe scolaire des Échassons, Groupe scolaire Jean Ferrat (primary only). Two nearby secondary schools, Collège Jean Moulin (junior high school) and Lycée Léonard de Vinci are in nearby Saint-Michel-sur-Orge.

== See also ==
- Communes of the Essonne department
