= National Register of Historic Places listings in Kane County, Illinois =

Location of Kane County in Illinois

This is a list of the National Register of Historic Places listings in Kane County, Illinois.

This is intended to be a complete list of the properties and districts on the National Register of Historic Places in Kane County, Illinois, United States. Latitude and longitude coordinates are provided for many National Register properties and districts; these locations may be seen together in a map.

There are 82 properties and districts listed on the National Register in the county, and five former listings. One of the listings is also a National Historic Landmark.

This National Park Service list is complete through NPS recent listings posted May 22, 2026.

== Current listings ==
	Name on the Register	Image	Date listed	Location	City or town	Description
1	Arcada Theater Building	Arcada Theater Building	August 16, 1994 (#94000977)	105 E. Main St. and 1st Ave. 41°54′49″N 88°18′43″W	St. Charles	
2	Aurora Broadway Historic District	Aurora Broadway Historic District	February 7, 2023 (#100008483)	Roughly bounded by the Fox R., East New York St., the Burlington Northern & Santa Fe Railroad tracks, and East Benton St. 41°45′23″N 88°18′53″W	Aurora	
3	Aurora College Complex	Aurora College Complex	February 16, 1984 (#84001126)	347 S. Gladstone Ave. 41°45′17″N 88°20′52″W	Aurora	Eckhart, Davis, and Wilkinson Halls were the first buildings at Aurora College. The school, which moved to Aurora from Mendota, was long affiliated with the Advent Christian Church. Eckhart was the main hall, and the other two served as dormitories.
4	Aurora Elks Lodge No. 705	Aurora Elks Lodge No. 705	March 31, 1980 (#80001369)	77 S. Stolp Ave. 41°45′23″N 88°19′02″W	Aurora	
5	Batavia Institute	Batavia Institute	August 13, 1976 (#76000712)	333 S. Jefferson St. 41°50′40″N 88°18′59″W	Batavia	
6	William Beith House	William Beith House	December 7, 1983 (#83003575)	6 Indiana St. 41°54′40″N 88°18′46″W	St. Charles	
7	Campana Factory	Campana Factory	April 6, 1979 (#79000841)	Roughly along Illinois Route 31 and Campana Rd. 41°51′54″N 88°18′58″W	Batavia	A state-of-the-art factory built in 1936 for The Campana Company, a cosmetics manufacturer. It is an example of the 1930s Streamline Moderne trend. The factory incorporated many innovative elements, such as air conditioning and a unique assembly line method.
8	Campton Town Hall	Campton Town Hall	November 24, 1980 (#80001378)	W of Wasco at Town Hall Rd. and IL 64; 41°55′56″N 88°25′45″W	Campton Hills	
9	Central Geneva Historic District	Central Geneva Historic District	September 10, 1979 (#79000845)	Roughly bounded by Fox River, South, 6th and W. State Sts.; also 0-200, 300-500 blocks S. 6th, 11-13 S. 7th, 600 blocks of State, James, Campbell, Fulton & South, 9,11 N. 2nd Sts. 41°53′08″N 88°18′30″W	Geneva	Second set of addresses represent a boundary increase approved July 10, 2017
10	Chicago, Burlington, & Quincy Roundhouse and Locomotive Shop	Chicago, Burlington, & Quincy Roundhouse and Locomotive Shop	February 16, 1978 (#78001154)	Broadway and Spring Sts. 41°45′39″N 88°18′30″W	Aurora	The roundhouse for the Chicago and Aurora Railroad (later Chicago, Burlington and Quincy Railroad) was a major employer in Aurora from 1856 to 1974. After it sat vacant for twenty-one years, a group of investors led by Walter Payton converted it into an entertainment complex. It is the oldest standing limestone roundhouse in the United States.
11	Chicago, Burlington, and Quincy Railroad Depot	Chicago, Burlington, and Quincy Railroad Depot	June 6, 1979 (#79000842)	155 Houston St. 41°51′05″N 88°18′37″W	Batavia	The 1854 Gothic Revival train station was the first built for the Chicago, Burlington, and Quincy Railroad. It was redicated as a museum in 1974.
12	City Building	City Building	March 21, 1979 (#79000847)	15 N. Riverside Ave. 41°54′51″N 88°18′46″W	St. Charles	
13	Col. Ira C. Copley Mansion	Col. Ira C. Copley Mansion	March 29, 1978 (#78001155)	434 W. Downer Pl. 41°45′33″N 88°19′27″W	Aurora	
14	Copley Hospital	Copley Hospital	April 18, 2019 (#100003648)	301 Weston Ave. 41°44′49″N 88°19′05″W	Aurora	
15	Corron Farm	Corron Farm	May 21, 2018 (#100001925)	7N761 Corron Rd. 41°58′49″N 88°24′18″W	St. Charles vicinity	
16	Country Tea Room	Country Tea Room	February 25, 1999 (#99000164)	14N630 IL 25; 42°04′36″N 88°15′36″W	Dundee Township	A historic restaurant built along future Illinois Route 25. Max McGraw, who brought the Toastmaster to the domestic market, purchased the building in 1926 and thrived as a tearoom. It was later converted to a full restaurant to meet the changing demands of travelers.
17	George M. Crego Farm		August 15, 2022 (#100007994)	35854 Finley Rd. 41°48′40″N 88°28′29″W	Sugar Grove vicinity	
18	Dundee Township Historic District	Dundee Township Historic District	March 7, 1975 (#75000666)	Both sides of Fox River, including sections of E. Dundee, W. Dundee, and Carpentersville; 42°06′07″N 88°16′55″W	East Dundee; West Dundee; Carpentersville	
19	Durant House	Durant House	June 18, 1976 (#76000714)	NW of St. Charles off Dean St. 41°55′38″N 88°20′50″W	St. Charles Township	
20	Dutch Mill	Dutch Mill	June 4, 1979 (#79000843)	N of Batavia off IL 25; 41°52′17″N 88°18′19″W	Batavia	
21	Elgin Academy	Elgin Academy	October 8, 1976 (#76000713)	350 Park St. 42°02′29″N 88°16′40″W	Elgin	
22	Elgin Downtown Commercial District	Elgin Downtown Commercial District	December 22, 2014 (#14001067)	Roughly bounded by Division, Villa, Center, Fulton & Grove. 42°02′12″N 88°17′01″W	Elgin	
23	Elgin Historic District	Elgin Historic District	May 9, 1983 (#83000318)	Roughly bounded by Villa, Center, Park, N. Liberty, and S. Channing Sts. 42°02′11″N 88°16′28″W	Elgin	
24	Elgin National Watch Company Observatory	Elgin National Watch Company Observatory	August 16, 1994 (#94000976)	312 Watch St. 42°01′48″N 88°16′24″W	Elgin	
25	Elgin Tower Building	Elgin Tower Building	May 22, 2002 (#02000542)	100 E. Chicago St. 42°02′15″N 88°17′03″W	Elgin	
26	Elizabeth Place	Elizabeth Place	May 12, 2008 (#08000398)	316 Elizabeth Pl. 41°52′46″N 88°18′39″W	Geneva	
27	Fabyan Villa	Fabyan Villa	February 9, 1984 (#84001128)	1511 S. Batavia Ave. 41°52′16″N 88°18′43″W	Geneva	
28	Fire Barn 5	Fire Barn 5	August 5, 1991 (#91001002)	533 St. Charles Rd. 42°01′32″N 88°16′10″W	Elgin	
29	First Methodist Church of Batavia	First Methodist Church of Batavia	March 19, 1982 (#82002546)	355 1st St. 41°50′54″N 88°18′50″W	Batavia	
30	First Universalist Church	First Universalist Church	November 7, 1980 (#80001374)	55 Villa St. 42°02′10″N 88°16′48″W	Elgin	
31	Sam and Ruth Van Sickle Ford House	Sam and Ruth Van Sickle Ford House	March 8, 2016 (#16000056)	404 S. Edgelawn Dr. 41°45′12″N 88°21′33″W	Aurora	Designated a National Historic Landmark in 2023.
32	Fox River House	Fox River House	May 4, 1976 (#76000710)	166 W. Galena; 41°45′32″N 88°19′04″W	Aurora	
33	GAR Memorial Building	GAR Memorial Building	August 23, 1984 (#84001130)	23 E. Downer Pl. 41°45′24″N 88°18′56″W	Aurora	
34	Garfield Farm and Tavern	Garfield Farm and Tavern	June 23, 1978 (#78001156)	3NO16 Garfield Rd. 41°54′36″N 88°24′01″W	Campton Hills	
35	Geneva Country Day School	Geneva Country Day School	August 21, 1989 (#89001111)	1250 South St. 41°52′59″N 88°19′13″W	Geneva	
36	Gifford–Davidson House	Gifford–Davidson House	May 31, 1980 (#80001375)	363-365 Prairie St. 42°02′03″N 88°16′39″W	Elgin	
37	Graham Building	Graham Building	March 19, 1982 (#82002543)	33 S. Stolp Ave. 41°45′26″N 88°18′57″W	Aurora	
38	Gray–Watkins Mill	Gray–Watkins Mill	December 17, 1979 (#79000846)	211 N. River St. 41°43′46″N 88°20′25″W	Montgomery	
39	Mrs. A. W. Gridley House	Mrs. A. W. Gridley House	February 3, 1993 (#92001850)	637 N. Batavia Ave. 41°51′36″N 88°18′49″W	Batavia	
40	Healy Chapel	Healy Chapel	February 28, 1985 (#85000361)	332 W. Downer Pl. 41°45′33″N 88°19′23″W	Aurora	
41	Hobbs Building	Hobbs Building	June 17, 2021 (#100006645)	2-4 North River St. 41°45′33″N 88°19′00″W	Aurora	
42	Holy Cross Church	Holy Cross Church	May 20, 1999 (#99000587)	14 N. Van Buren St. 41°51′01″N 88°18′10″W	Batavia	
43	Hotel Arthur	Hotel Arthur	March 15, 2005 (#04001300)	2-4 N. Broadway; 41°45′33″N 88°18′47″W	Aurora	
44	Hotel Aurora	Hotel Aurora	June 3, 1982 (#82002544)	2 N. Stolp Ave. 41°45′30″N 88°18′54″W	Aurora	
45	Hotel Baker	Hotel Baker	December 8, 1978 (#78001157)	100 W. Main St. 41°54′49″N 88°18′54″W	St. Charles	
46	Joel H. Hulburd House	Joel H. Hulburd House	May 4, 2011 (#11000244)	304 N. 2nd Ave. 41°54′59″N 88°18′43″W	St. Charles	
47	Hunt House	Hunt House	November 12, 1982 (#82000397)	304 Cedar Ave. 41°54′54″N 88°18′38″W	St. Charles	
48	International Corset Company Building		December 30, 2024 (#100011203)	325 South Union Street; 41°44′57″N 88°18′08″W	Aurora	
49	International Harvester Showroom and Warehouse	International Harvester Showroom and Warehouse	January 31, 2022 (#100005050)	6,12 North River St. 41°45′34″N 88°19′00″W	Aurora	
50	Keystone Building	Keystone Building	March 18, 1980 (#80001370)	30 S. Stolp Ave. 41°45′26″N 88°18′57″W	Aurora	
51	Larkin Home for Children	Larkin Home for Children	December 31, 2018 (#100003264)	1212 Larkin Ave. 42°02′11″N 88°18′32″W	Elgin	
52	LaSalle Street Auto Row Historic District	LaSalle Street Auto Row Historic District	August 1, 1996 (#96000856)	56-84 LaSalle St. and 57-83 S. LaSalle St. 41°45′18″N 88°18′48″W	Aurora	
53	Library Hall	Library Hall	August 14, 1973 (#73000709)	21 N. Washington St. 42°06′37″N 88°17′16″W	Carpentersville	
54	Abraham Lincoln School	Abraham Lincoln School	April 12, 2022 (#100007585)	641 South Lake St. 41°44′57″N 88°19′58″W	Aurora	
55	Masonic Temple	Masonic Temple	March 19, 1982 (#82002545)	104 S. Lincoln Ave. 41°45′12″N 88°18′46″W	Aurora	Destroyed in a 2019 fire
56	Memorial Washington Reformed Presbyterian Church	Memorial Washington Reformed Presbyterian Church	November 19, 1980 (#80001376)	West of Elgin on W. Highland Ave. Rd. 42°03′51″N 88°23′28″W	Elgin	
57	Middle Avenue Historic District	Middle Avenue Historic District	October 24, 2016 (#16000735)	Bounded by S. Lake, Cross, S. River & Gale Sts. 41°45′19″N 88°19′23″W	Aurora	
58	Robert and Elizabeth Muirhead House	Robert and Elizabeth Muirhead House	January 12, 2016 (#15000965)	42W814 Rohrson Rd. 42°02′09″N 88°27′02″W	Plato Center	
59	North Geneva Historic District	North Geneva Historic District	March 25, 1982 (#82002549)	Roughly bounded by RR tracks, Fox River, Stevens and W. State Sts.; also 100-200 N. River Ln. 41°53′23″N 88°18′30″W	Geneva	Second set of addresses represent a boundary increase approved July 10, 2017
60	Oaklawn Farm	Oaklawn Farm	July 26, 1979 (#79000848)	Army Trail and Dunham Rds. 41°57′02″N 88°16′10″W	Wayne	
61	Old Second National Bank	Old Second National Bank	May 8, 1979 (#79000840)	37 S. River St. 41°45′28″N 88°19′06″W	Aurora	
62	Paramount Theatre	Paramount Theatre	March 18, 1980 (#80001371)	23 E. Galena Blvd. 41°45′25″N 88°18′54″W	Aurora	
63	Ora Pelton House	Ora Pelton House	August 12, 1982 (#82002548)	214 S. State St. 42°01′49″N 88°17′01″W	Elgin	
64	Potter and Barker Grain Elevator	Potter and Barker Grain Elevator	December 27, 2016 (#16000899)	1N298 La Fox Rd. 41°53′14″N 88°24′34″W	La Fox	
65	Pure Oil Station	Pure Oil Station	April 23, 2013 (#13000186)	502 W. State St. 41°53′17″N 88°18′40″W	Geneva	
66	Riverbank Laboratories	Riverbank Laboratories	November 28, 2003 (#03001204)	1512 Batavia Ave. 41°52′18″N 88°18′50″W	Geneva	
67	St. Charles Hospital	St. Charles Hospital	June 7, 2010 (#10000312)	400 E New York St. 41°45′25″N 88°18′27″W	Aurora	
68	St. Charles Municipal Building	St. Charles Municipal Building	February 21, 1991 (#91000087)	2 E. Main St. 41°54′50″N 88°18′46″W	St. Charles	
69	St. Mary's Church of Gilberts	St. Mary's Church of Gilberts	August 18, 1992 (#92001018)	10 Mattesen St. 42°06′23″N 88°22′30″W	Gilberts	
70	Ephraim Smith House	Ephraim Smith House	June 6, 1980 (#80001377)	NE of Sugar Grove; 41°47′12″N 88°26′52″W	Sugar Grove Township	
71	Spring–Douglas Historic District	Spring–Douglas Historic District	April 28, 2000 (#00000410)	Roughly Spring St. and Douglas Ave., bet. River Bluff Rd. and Kimball Ave. 42°03′03″N 88°17′04″W	Elgin	
72	Stearns–Wadsworth House	Stearns–Wadsworth House	March 19, 1982 (#82002547)	1 S. 570 Bliss Rd. 41°50′40″N 88°24′26″W	Blackberry Township	
73	Stolp Island Historic District	Stolp Island Historic District	September 10, 1986 (#86001487)	Stolp Island; 41°45′27″N 88°18′56″W	Aurora	
74	Stolp Woolen Mill Store	Stolp Woolen Mill Store	September 1, 1983 (#83000319)	2 W. Downer Pl. 41°45′25″N 88°18′59″W	Aurora	
75	William A. Tanner House	William A. Tanner House	August 19, 1976 (#76000711)	304 Oak Ave. 41°45′49″N 88°19′06″W	Aurora	
76	Mary A. Todd School	Mary A. Todd School	April 12, 2022 (#100007584)	100 Oak Ave. 41°45′43″N 88°19′09″W	Aurora	
77	United Methodist Church of Batavia	United Methodist Church of Batavia	July 28, 1983 (#83000320)	8 N. Batavia Ave. 41°51′02″N 88°18′42″W	Batavia	
78	Andrew Weisel House	Andrew Weisel House	February 26, 1982 (#82002550)	312 N. 2nd Ave. 41°54′59″N 88°18′42″W	St. Charles	
79	West Side Historic District	West Side Historic District	August 13, 1986 (#86001484)	Roughly bounded by W. Downer Pl., Lake St., Garfield Ave., and S. Highland St. 41°45′11″N 88°19′31″W	Aurora	
80	Louise White School	Louise White School	November 7, 1980 (#80001373)	Washington Ave. 41°51′03″N 88°18′14″W	Batavia	
81	Judge Isaac Wilson House	Judge Isaac Wilson House	May 9, 1985 (#85000978)	406 E. Wilson St. 41°51′00″N 88°18′04″W	Batavia	
82	Wing Park Golf Course	Wing Park Golf Course	February 18, 2009 (#09000027)	1000 Wing St. 42°02′51″N 88°18′17″W	Elgin	

== Former listings ==
	Name on the Register	Image	Date listed	Date removed	Location	City or town	Description
1	Aurora Watch Factory		May 8, 1986 (#86001009)	December 8, 1995	603 - 621 LaSalle St.	Aurora	Destroyed by fire, December 17, 1989.
2	Elgin Milk Condensing Co./Illinois Condensing Co.		February 14, 1985 (#85000267)	April 17, 2003	Brook and Water Streets	Elgin	Demolished in 1998.
3	Hartsburg and Hawksley Saw Mill		July 11, 1974 (#74002283)	March 17, 1975	25 East State Street	North Aurora	Demolished in 1974
4	Old Hotel		September 21, 1989 (#89001464)	March 14, 2002	241 Main Street	Sugar Grove	Demolished in April 1999
5	Teeple Barn	Teeple Barn	December 10, 1979 (#79000844)	January 2, 2020	NW of Elgin on Randall Rd. 42°04′39″N 88°20′06″W	Elgin	Destroyed in a 2007 storm.

== See also ==
- List of National Historic Landmarks in Illinois
- National Register of Historic Places listings in Illinois
