= Weisel (surname) =

Weisel is a German surname.

- Andrew Weisel
- Al Weisel
- Heidi Weisel
- Max Weisel
- Mindy Weisel
- Richard D. Weisel
- Thom Weisel
