= Mrs. A. W. Gridley House =

Historic house in Illinois, United States

- Mrs. A. W. Gridley House (Ravine House)
- U.S. National Register of Historic Places
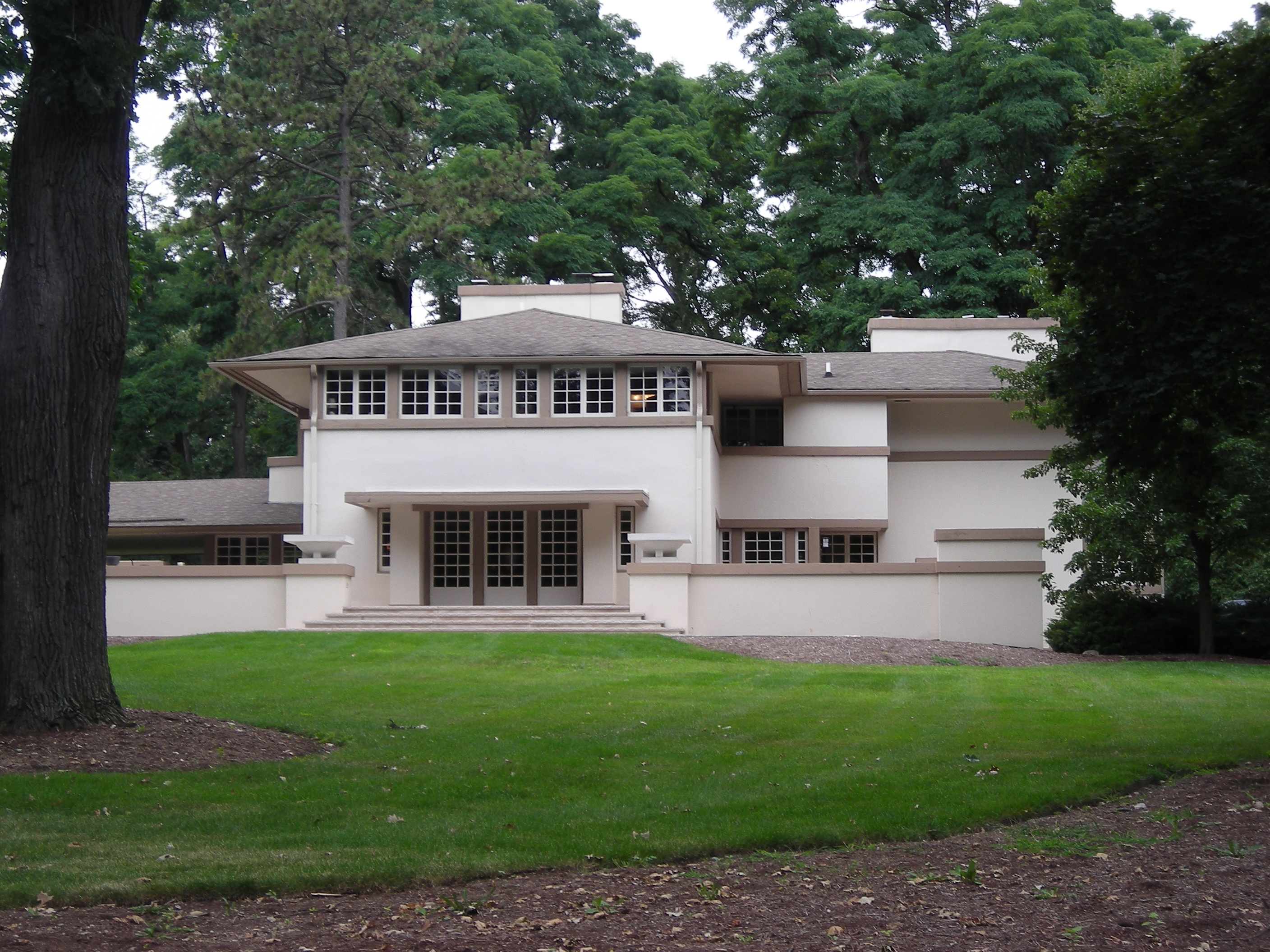

- Location within Illinois Location within the United States
- Location: 605 North Batavia Road, Batavia, Illinois
- Coordinates: 41°51′35.75″N 88°18′50.75″W
- Area: 2.3 acres (0.93 ha)
- Built: 1906
- Architect: Frank Lloyd Wright
- Architectural style: Prairie School
- NRHP reference No.: 92001850
- Added to NRHP: February 3, 1993

The Mrs. A. W. Gridley House is a Frank Lloyd Wright designed Prairie School home in Batavia, Illinois.

== History ==
This 5,100-square-foot (470 m^{2}) house is on a 2.3 wooded acre lot, set well back from the street. Gridley met Wright through P. D. Hoyt, owner of the P. D. Hoyt House in nearby Geneva. The Gridley house was built in 1906. Wright named the house "Ravine House", because of the sloping wildflower ravine to the south of the house. Gridley had financial problems and only lived in the house a short time. In 1912, the house was sold to Frank Snow, president of Batavia's Challenge Feed Mill and Wind Mill Company. Members of the family lived in the house until 1981. The property has been well maintained and any alterations have been well designed in keeping with the original integrity of the house. On February 3, 1993, the house was recognized by the National Park Service with a listing on the National Register of Historic Places.

== Architecture ==
With a low-pitch hip roof, projecting eaves, uninterrupted cedar trim and casement windows, the fourteen room stucco and cypress house is an excellent example of Wright's Prairie School style. The house features include three Roman brick fireplaces, elegant woodwork & built-ins. Wright's plan included a stucco wall surrounding the front wing which has been removed and a barn that was never built. The Gridley house is in a cruciform plan, common for Wright's early Prairie School houses. The house was decorated with earth-toned stucco, stained cedar trim, and a shake cedar roof; the roof has since been replaced with asphalt shingles. Stuccoed terrace walls that surrounded the front (east) wing were also removed.

=== Interior ===
White oak hardwood floors are used throughout the house. The walls and doors on the second story are pine, as are the floors of the servant's quarters. The floors of the kitchen and butler's pantry are maple, though they have pine doors. The interior plan is dominated with a large front hall running north to south. The east section was the living room, decorated with a Roman brick fireplace, glass terrace doors, side windows, and built-in oak bookcases. Doorways on either side of the fireplace lead to the dining room and hall. The north end of the building is a study room and the south end is a dining room. The study includes another Roman brick fireplace and has a built-in gun and trophy case. The dining room includes a built-in oak buffet with leaded glass lights. Glass doors on the south lead to a covered porch with half walls. The butler's pantry is in the corner of the dining room with built-in cabinets and a copper sink. A narrow hall used as a coat room is found between the dining room and staircase. The oak staircase sits at the center of the house and is ornamented with oak moldings. The west wing of the house was the servants' work and living quarters. A small 12-by-15-square-foot (1.1 m^{2} × 1.4 m^{2}) addition was completed in 1992. Against the west wall is a small, simple sitting room for the servants. This room also allowed convenient access for servants to the main rooms of the house.

The staircase leads to an upper landing, where three more steps in the reverse direction lead to the main upper hall. The landing includes a door that leads to the servant's staircase, which connects to the sitting room. This staircase also leads to a second-floor sleeping room for servants. The hall is split with a half-wall created by the stairway balustrades and handrail. There are five bedrooms on the upper level. The north bedroom includes a Roman brick fireplace and a walk-in closet. Plumbing throughout the house was replaced, first in the 1930s and then again in 1992.

== See also ==
- List of Frank Lloyd Wright works
- National Register of Historic Places listings in Kane County, Illinois
