= Robert and Elizabeth Muirhead House =

Historic house in Illinois, United States

- U.S. National Register of Historic Places
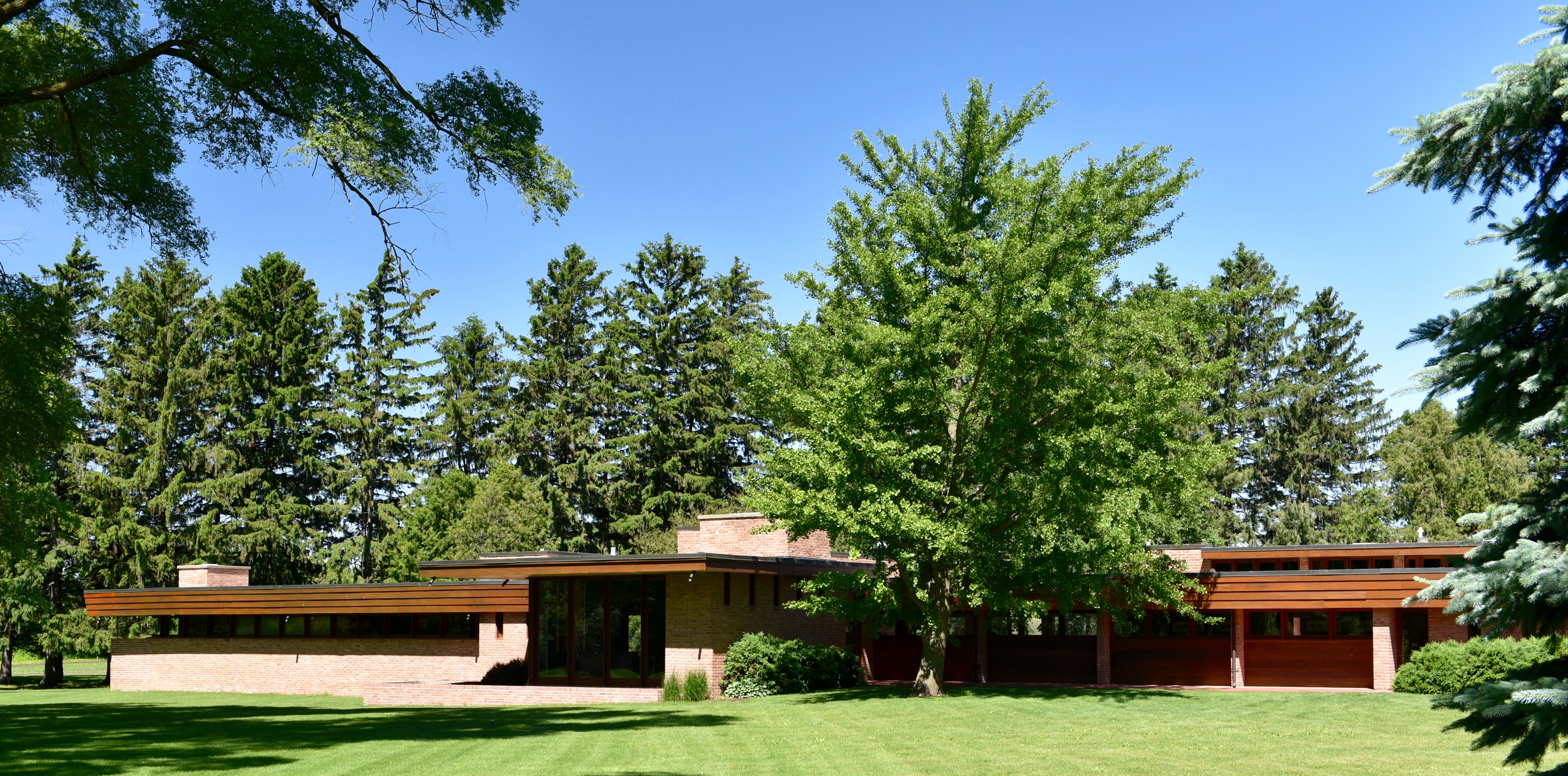

- Location within Illinois Location within the United States
- Location: 42W814 Rohrson Rd., Plato Center, Illinois
- Coordinates: 42°02′09″N 88°27′02″W
- Built: 1951-53
- Architect: Frank Lloyd Wright
- Architectural style: Usonian
- NRHP reference No.: 15000965
- Added to NRHP: January 12, 2016

The Robert and Elizabeth Muirhead House is a historic house located at 42W814 Rohrson Road northeast of Plato Center, Illinois. Built in 1951–53, the house was designed by Frank Lloyd Wright in his Usonian style. Robert and Elizabeth Muirhead, the home's owners, had met Wright in 1948 while touring Taliesin, and the meeting inspired them to commission Wright to design their own home. The one-story house is horizontally oriented to match its flat surroundings, in keeping with Wright's design principles. Rows of casement windows and a wooden parapet along the roof add to the house's horizontal emphasis. The house's interior also includes several typical elements of Wright's work, including a deemphasized front entrance, floor-to-ceiling windows used to bring in additional light, and a sense of contrast and connection between rooms.

The house was added to the National Register of Historic Places on January 12, 2016.

== See also ==
- List of Frank Lloyd Wright works
- National Register of Historic Places listings in Kane County, Illinois
