= International Harvester Showroom and Warehouse =

- U.S. National Register of Historic Places
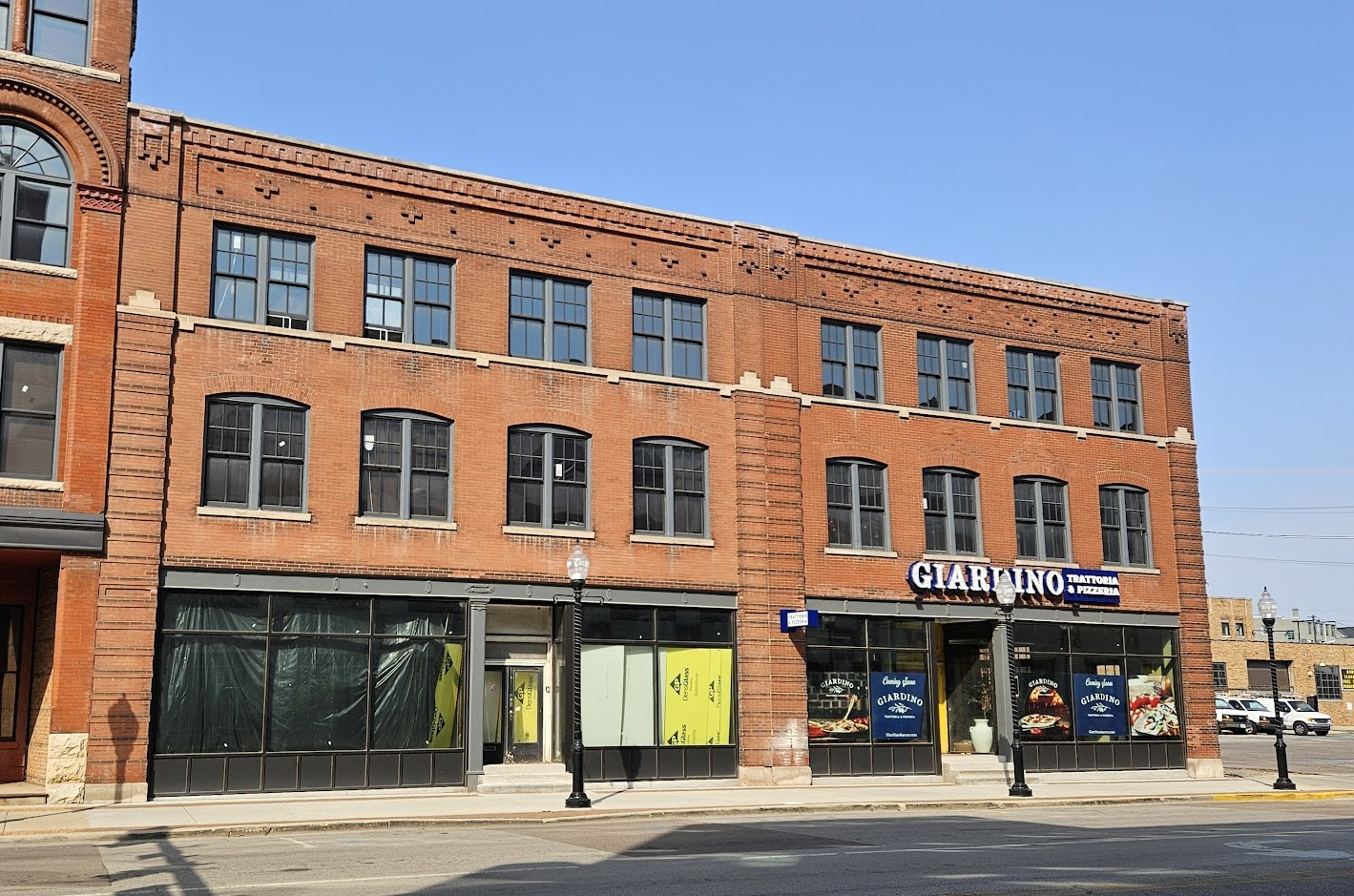
- International Harvester Showroom and Warehouse in 2024

- Location within Chicago metropolitan area Location within Illinois Location within the United States
- Location: 6-12 North River St. Aurora, Illinois
- Coordinates: 41°45′34″N 88°19′00″W
- NRHP reference No.: 100005050
- Added to NRHP: January 31, 2022

The International Harvester Showroom and Warehouse is a historic building at 6-12 North River Street in Aurora, Illinois. The building served as a dealership for farming equipment company International Harvester, which was headquartered nearby in Chicago, in the early twentieth century. While the building's construction date is unclear, it was built before 1901, and International Harvester first occupied it in 1905. The building was one of 99 independently run International Harvester dealerships in the United States and Canada in the 1900s, and in 1905 it was among the company's top ten dealers in sales. The building is technically made up of two conjoined buildings with mirrored floor plans; each building has a cast iron store front, and their open floor plans and tall floors were ideal for holding large equipment. In 1912, International Harvester relocated their dealership to a larger building at 251 South River Street.

The building was added to the National Register of Historic Places on January 31, 2022.

== See also ==
- International Harvester Building (Wichita, Kansas)
- National Register of Historic Places listings in Kane County, Illinois
