= International Harvester Building (Wichita, Kansas) =

Historic building in Wichita, Kansas

- U.S. National Register of Historic Places
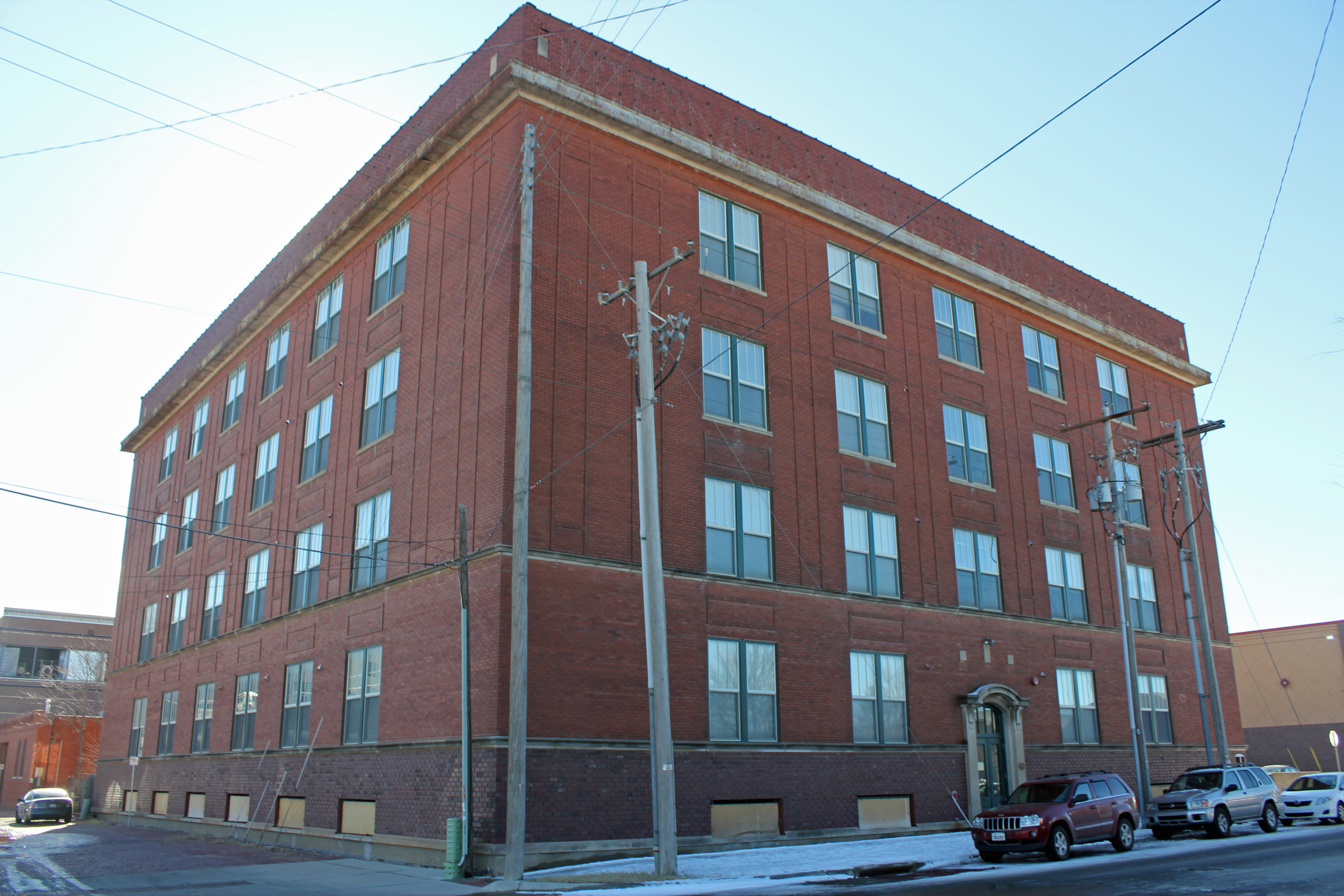
- Northeast corner of building

- Location within Kansas Location within the United States
- Location: 355 North Rock Island Street (803-811 East Third Street); Wichita, Kansas 67202
- Coordinates: 37°41′29″N 97°19′42″W
- Area: Old Town, Wichita
- Built: 1910
- Built by: A.S. Parks
- Architectural style: Early Commercial
- Restored: 2004
- Restored by: Gary Hassenflu
- Website: rentathistoric1910lofts.com
- NRHP reference No.: 02001702
- Added to NRHP: January 15, 2003

The International Harvester Building, now the Historic 1910 Lofts, is a building in Wichita, Kansas listed on the National Register of Historic Places. International Harvester built the Old Town structure in 1910 which now contains loft apartments.

== History ==
Prior to the 1902 merger that created International Harvester, agricultural equipment companies spent 30-40% of their budgets on sales costs to reach remote farming customers. In the following years, the company began building retail showrooms across the Midwest in order to display their full line of products under one roof.

The company purchased the prime lot just to the east of the Rock Island Railroad for US$15,000 (equivalent to about $500,000 in 2025) and constructed the building in 1910 for US$75,000 (equivalent to about $2,600,000 in 2025). International Harvester continued to occupy the building until 1959.

In 1963 the Graham Glass Company moved in, and, in 1978, the Case Supply Flooring Company began occupying the building. After they left in 2000, the building sat vacant. As part of a revitalization effort, the National Register of Historic Places and Register of Historic Kansas Places both listed the property in 2003.

A residential conversion in 2004, called the "Harvester Lofts", turned the building into apartments. The complex later changed names to the "Historic 1910 Lofts".

== Architecture ==
The four-story building uses two colors of brick and follows an Early Commercial style. The exterior is formal on the north side facing Third Street and the east side facing Rock Island Avenue. Both have metal courses below the first and second stories and a stone cornice along the roof. But, even here, the ornamentation is limited because vibrations expected from the machinery discouraged any decorative elements that protruded from the facades. The less formal west and south sides faced the railroad and loading dock, respectively, and still have ghost signs advertising International Harvester.

The interior originally consisted of open spaces with wood piers which held sales and display rooms on the lower floors and merchandise storage in the upper stories. The reinforced concrete floors were strong enough to hold 250 pounds per square foot (1,221 kilograms per square meter) for all the vehicles and machinery.

The 2004 renovations created 48 apartments and moved the main entrance to the south side next to a new elevator. The south side also has a gated parking lot with additional parking in the basement.

== See also ==
- International Harvester Building (Aurora, Illinois)
- National Register of Historic Places listings in Sedgwick County, Kansas
