= Middle Avenue Historic District =

- U.S. National Register of Historic Places
- U.S. Historic district
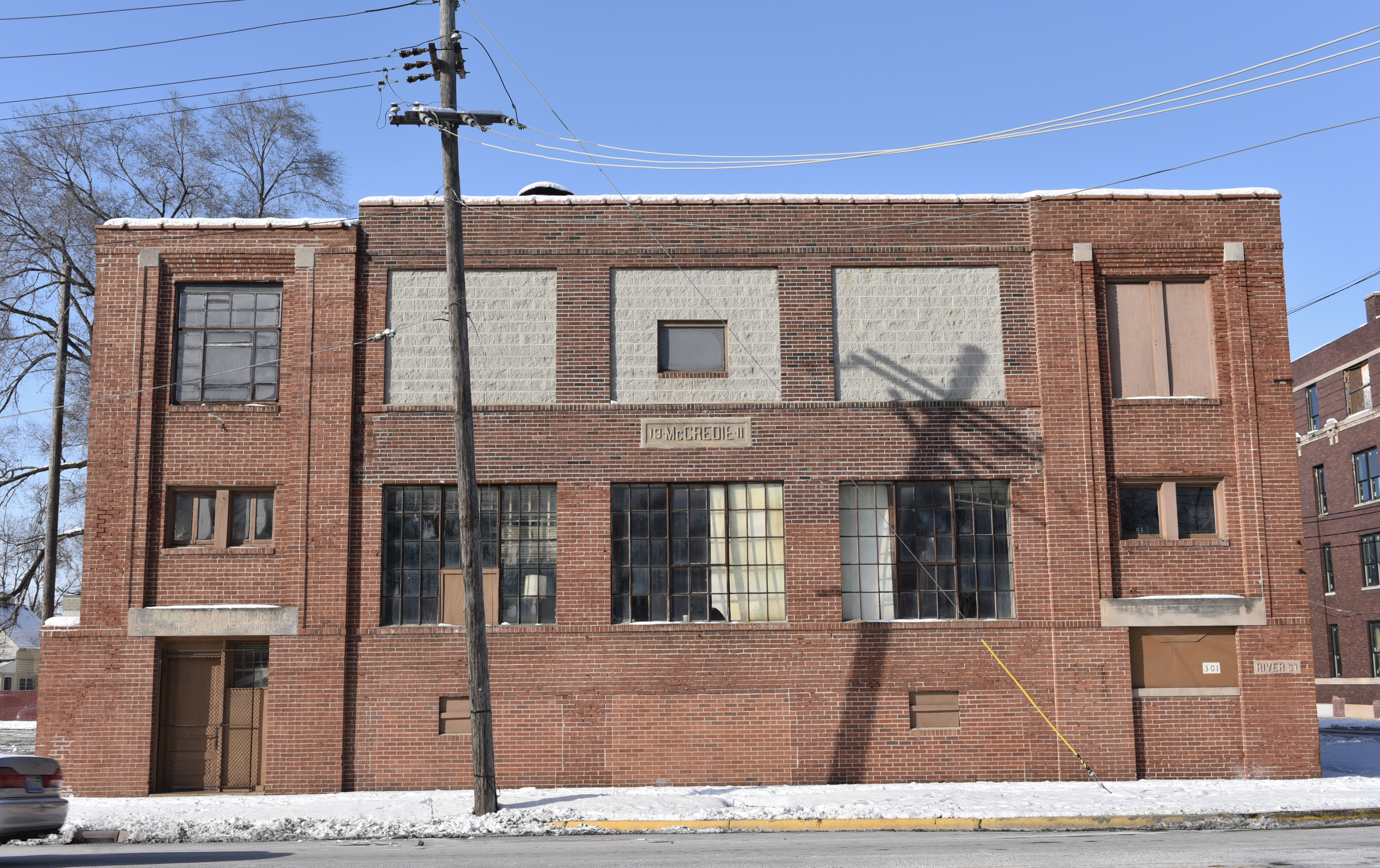
- McCredie Building

- Location within Illinois Location within the United States
- Location: Bounded by S. Lake, Cross, S. River & Gale Sts., Aurora, Illinois
- Coordinates: 41°45′19″N 88°19′23″W
- NRHP reference No.: 16000735
- Added to NRHP: October 24, 2016

The Middle Avenue Historic District is an industrial historic district located on two square blocks in downtown Aurora, Illinois. The district includes eleven buildings, eight of which are contributing buildings to its historic nature. The district formed in the early 20th century along a Chicago, Burlington and Quincy Railroad branch known as the Alley Job, and its buildings fall into three main categories: factories, distribution buildings, and warehouses. The district's factories include facilities operated by the Pictorial Printing Company and the typewriter ribbon company Miller-Bryant-Pierce. Distribution and office buildings in the district include multiple buildings owned by International Harvester and the McCredie Building, which was used by various coal businesses. The district also includes three warehouses and a filling station.

The district was added to the National Register of Historic Places on October 24, 2016.
