= Ephraim Smith House =

Historic house in Illinois, United States

- U.S. National Register of Historic Places
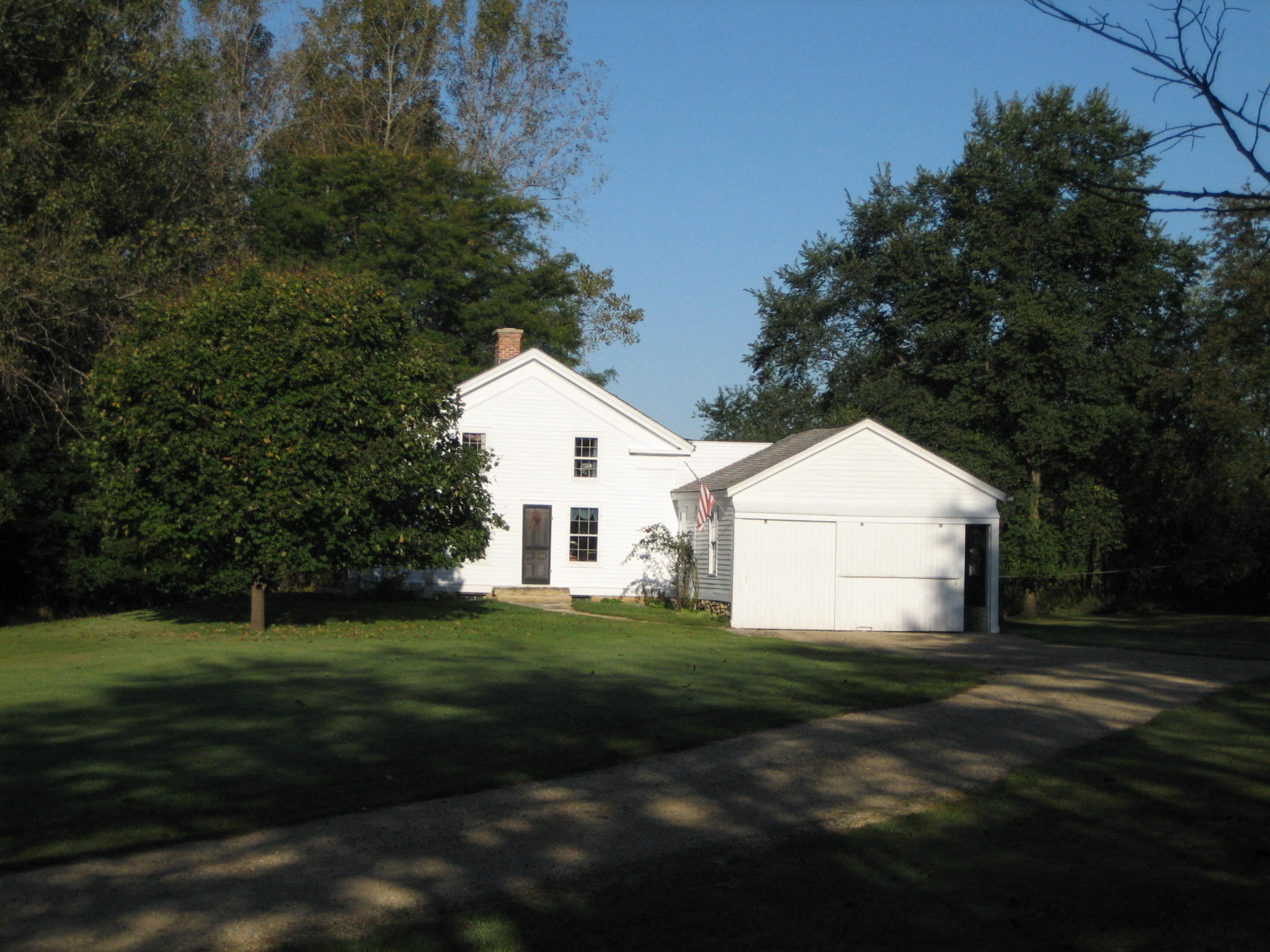
- East elevation, Ephraim Smith House

- Location within Illinois Location within the United States
- Nearest city: Sugar Grove, Illinois
- Coordinates: 41°46′17″N 88°25′43″W
- Area: 6 acres (2.4 ha)
- Built: 1845
- Architect: Ephraim Smith
- Architectural style: Greek Revival
- NRHP reference No.: 80001377
- Added to NRHP: June 6, 1980

The Ephraim Smith House is an 1845 Greek Revival house in the village of Sugar Grove, Illinois, United States. The house was built by Ephraim Smith, a millwright from Vermont. It is the only example of a wood framed Greek Revival rural house in Kane County that remains in its unaltered state. The house has, however, been moved from its original location. The Ephraim Smith House was added to the U.S. National Register of Historic Places in 1980.

== History ==
Construction on the Ephraim Smith House began sometime shortly after Ephraim Smith's 1844 arrival in Sugar Grove Township, Kane County, Illinois. Smith, a millwright by trade for over 25 years, built the home himself. Smith, from Pawlet in Rutland County, Vermont, purchased 52 acres from Lyman Isbell and promptly returned to Vermont for his family. The family occupied a small cabin while the house was being built. Smith's youngest child, Julia, was born in the cabin in 1845. The original house was composed of locally cut timber using the post and beam method of construction. The house is believed to be the last small frame, Greek Revival, rural house in Kane County that remains in a largely unaltered form.

The Ephraim Smith House had to be moved to avoid demolition during the late 1970s. When the house was nominated for inclusion on the U.S. National Register of Historic Places in 1979, the move was ongoing. At the new site, a concrete foundation was poured. The above grade portion of the new foundation was faced with the original foundation's limestone. The limestone foundation and basement stones were moved from the old to the new site to be used for this purpose.

== Architecture ==
The Ephraim Smith house was built and designed by Ephraim Smith in the Greek Revival style of architecture. The original, main house, dates to 1845 and is a one-story frame building, measuring approximately 25 feet (7.6 m) by 33 feet (10 m). The post and beam construction, which is combined with brick nogging, is rare for the area and the period as cheaper, more efficient balloon framing began to dominate new construction.

The front (south) door is unique in its design. Surrounding the inset door are eleven transom windows and three sidelight windows. The sidelights are set above wooden panels. The house stands on a limestone foundation, with some concrete added after the building was moved, and the cedar shingled roof features a central chimney.

== Significance ==
For its architectural significance, as the only example of an unaltered Greek Revival house in rural Kane County the Ephraim Smith House was listed on the U.S. National Register of Historic Places on June 6, 1980. The craftsmanship of the building, along with its stylistic design were cited as the reasons for the nomination to the National Register.
