= Pure Oil Service Station (Geneva, Illinois) =

- Pure Oil Station
- U.S. National Register of Historic Places
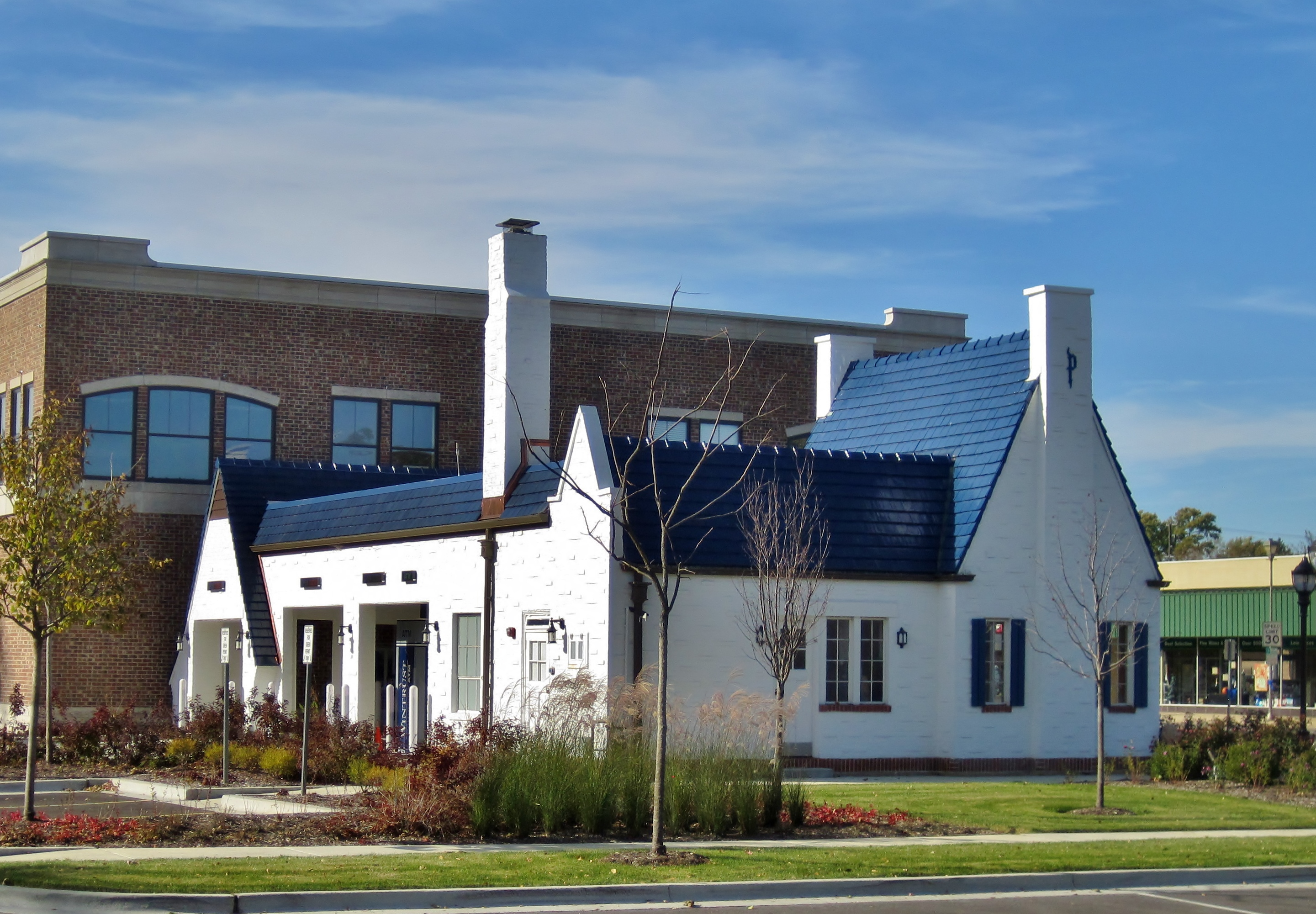
- Pure Oil Station in October 2013

- Location within Illinois Location within the United States
- Location: 502 W. State St., Geneva, Illinois
- Coordinates: 41°53′17″N 88°18′40″W
- Area: less than one acre
- Built: 1937
- Architect: Carl August Petersen
- Architectural style: Tudor Revival
- NRHP reference No.: 13000186
- Added to NRHP: April 23, 2013

The Pure Oil Service Station in Geneva, Illinois is a former gas station for the Pure Oil Company. The historic building was recognized by the National Park Service on its National Register of Historic Places on April 23, 2013.

== History ==
The Pure Oil Station in Geneva, Illinois was built in 1937 on Illinois Route 38 (West State Street) at its intersection with Fifth Street. The Pure Oil Company popularized the idea of filling station buildings. Prior to the 1920s, filling stations were regarded as unappealing fire hazards and were kept away from residential areas. Pure Oil developed a cheap, attractive design in the Tudor Revival style that fit the suburban aesthetic ideal. Pure Oil's design became their corporate trademark starting in 1927. Carl August Petersen, the Chief Engineer of Marketing Construction for Pure Oil, was responsible for the design which was replicated all over the country.

By 1945, there were six gas stations along the four blocks of downtown State Street. Only two remain—this station and an unnamed station of questionable integrity at 427 State Street. It is not a contributing property of the Central Geneva Historic District, but is within its physical boundaries.

== Architecture ==
The main facade faces Illinois Route 38 to the north, and the east facade faces South Fifth Street. The exterior is brick, covered in white paint. The east section of the building serviced pedestrians and the west section serviced vehicles. The brickwork is decoratively skintled (bricks are irregularly projecting at varying degrees). The building has a steeply pitched gable roof covered with blue glazed Ludowici tile. A flat roof covers the south half of the service bays, though it is mostly hidden from view because of the pitched roof. Three brick chimneys flank the ends of the gables. Two of these chimneys have a large metal letter "P", painted white, a Pure Oil emblem.
