= Copley Hospital (Aurora, Illinois) =

- U.S. National Register of Historic Places
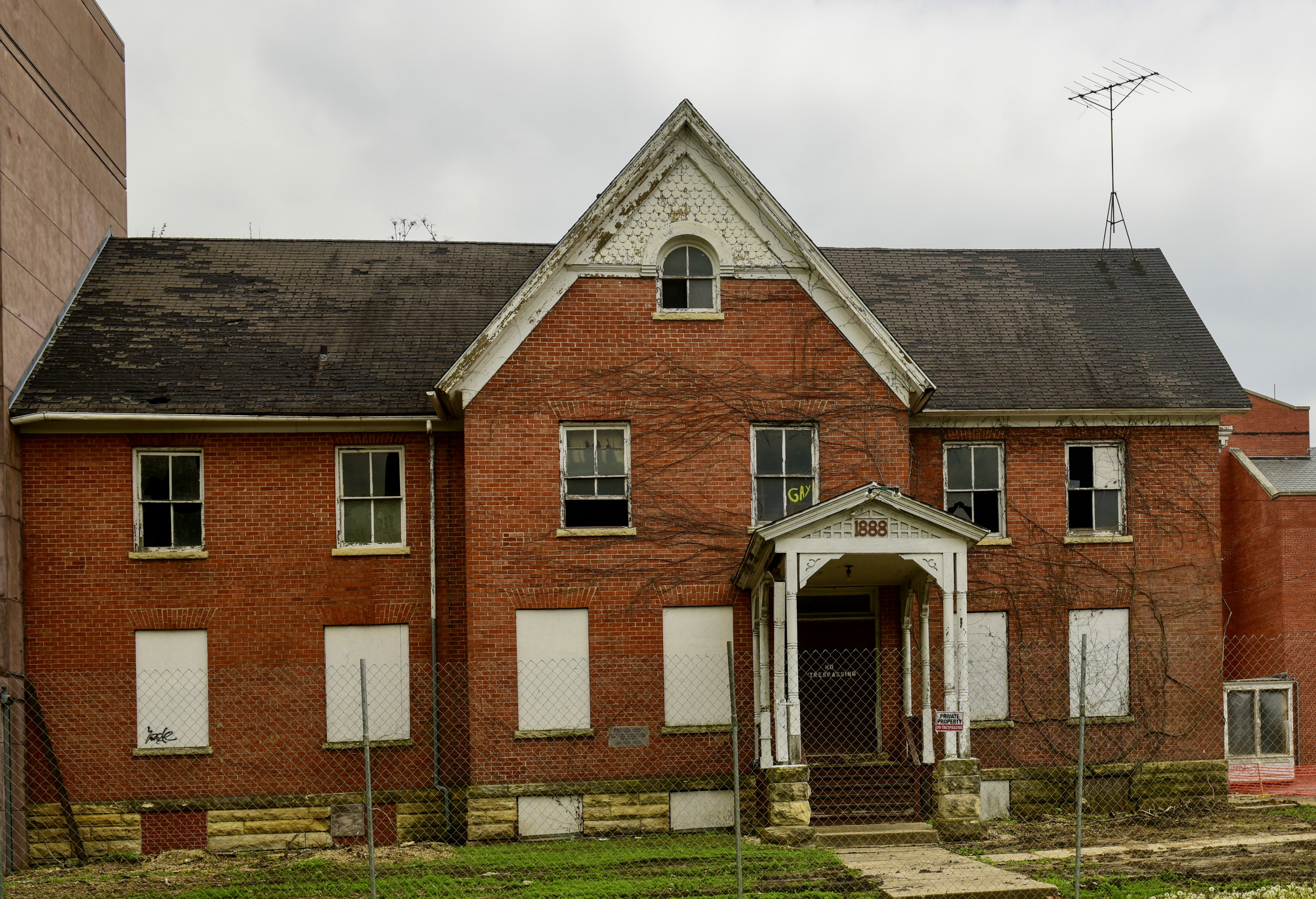

- Location within Chicago metropolitan area Location within Illinois Location within the United States
- Location: 301 Weston Ave., Aurora, Illinois
- Coordinates: 41°44′49″N 88°19′05″W
- Built: 1888
- NRHP reference No.: 100003648
- Added to NRHP: April 18, 2019

Copley Hospital is a former hospital at 301 Weston Avenue in Aurora, Illinois.

== History ==
Opened in 1888, the hospital was the first in Aurora, and it remained the city's only one until 1900. The building underwent several additions and expansions over time, both to add more space and to help modernize the hospital's practices. The first of these additions came in 1916, when a new wing opened; this section brought wider hallways, elevators, patient call systems, and better-lit patient rooms to the hospital. A 1932 addition was designed by architects Schmidt, Garden & Erikson in the Neoclassical style; it included an expansion for the hospital's maternity ward and radiology and training facilities. The same architects designed another addition in 1947, which coincided with the hospital's renaming in honor of Ira C. Copley; Copley's donations had funded both the 1932 and 1947 additions. Two more additions were placed on the building in 1970 and 1980, and the hospital was closed and replaced by the new Rush–Copley Medical Center in 1995. When the building was vacant it became popular with urban exploring and paranormal investigators as it is supposed to be haunted despite the building being unsafe.

The hospital was added to the National Register of Historic Places on April 18, 2019.

In August 2018, the city approved a plan for the hospital to be renovated by Fox Valley Developers LLC and Kluber Architects + Engineers, with the intention of converting it into a nursing home and apartments for people with disabilities.

In December 2024, the site reopened as Atrevete Café 1888.
