= Larkin Home for Children =

- U.S. National Register of Historic Places
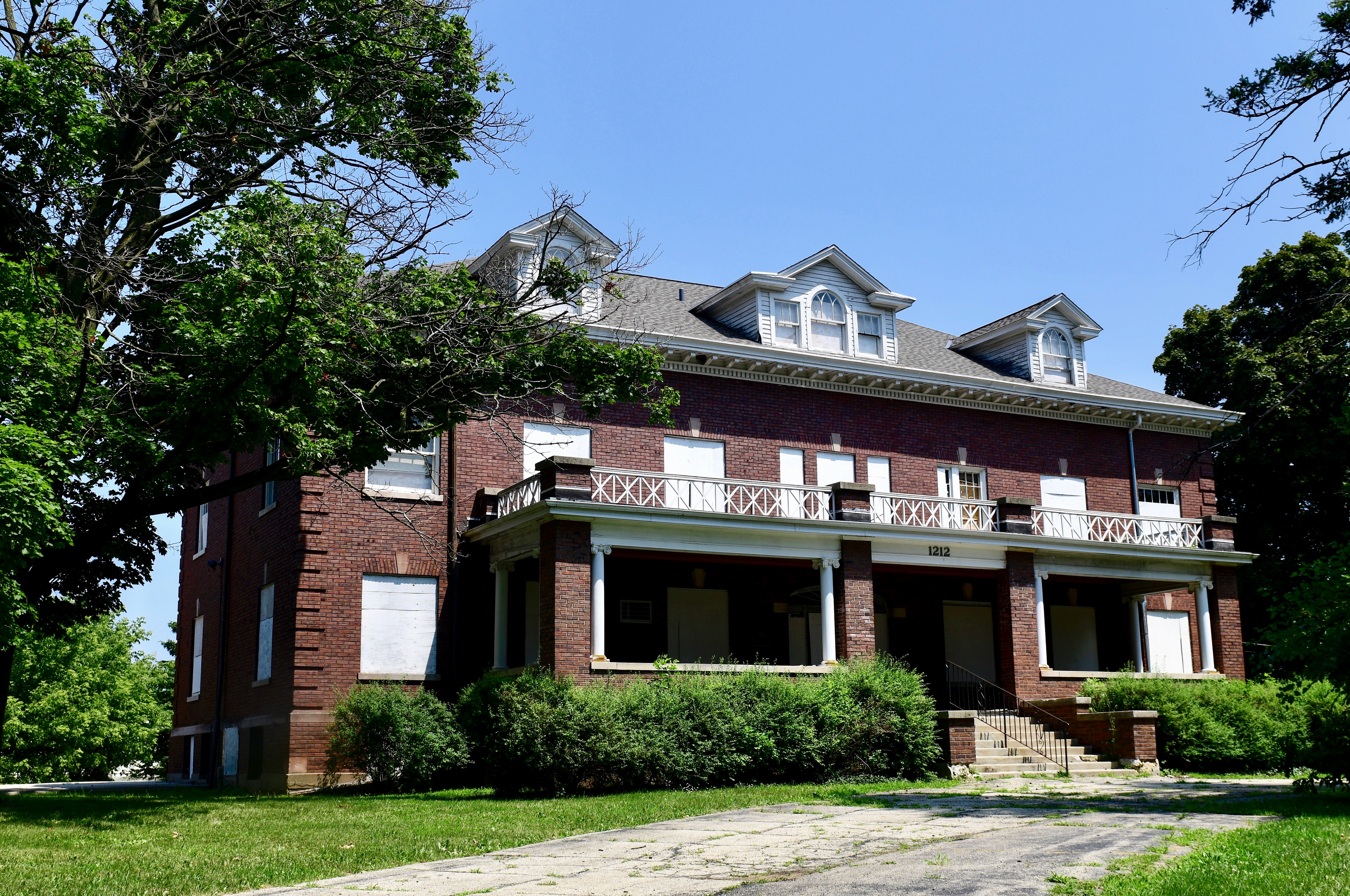

- Location within Chicago metropolitan area Location within Illinois Location within the United States
- Location: 1212 Larkin Ave., Elgin, Illinois
- Coordinates: 42°02′11″N 88°18′32″W
- Built: 1912
- Architect: George Morris
- Architectural style: Georgian Revival
- NRHP reference No.: 100003264
- Added to NRHP: December 31, 2018

The Larkin Home for Children is a former orphanage at 1212 Larkin Avenue in Elgin, Illinois. The Larkin Home originated from the Elgin Children's Home Society, which was founded in 1898; it operated from a donated building until 1912, when it built its own orphanage due to space concerns. The home was funded by private donors and sought to provide a stable domestic environment for the children it housed, making it a typical example of a Progressive Era orphanage and contrasting it with earlier government-run programs. Architect George Morris designed the 1912 building in the Georgian Revival style. A hospital was built on the home's property in 1926 to address the home's difficulties caring for ill children. The home continued to house children until 1966, when it was converted to an administrative building due to changes in the Larkin Home's mission; it closed entirely in 2013.

The orphanage was added to the National Register of Historic Places on December 31, 2018.
