= Teeple Barn =

Historic structure in Elgin, Illinois

- Formerly listed on the U.S. National Register of Historic Places
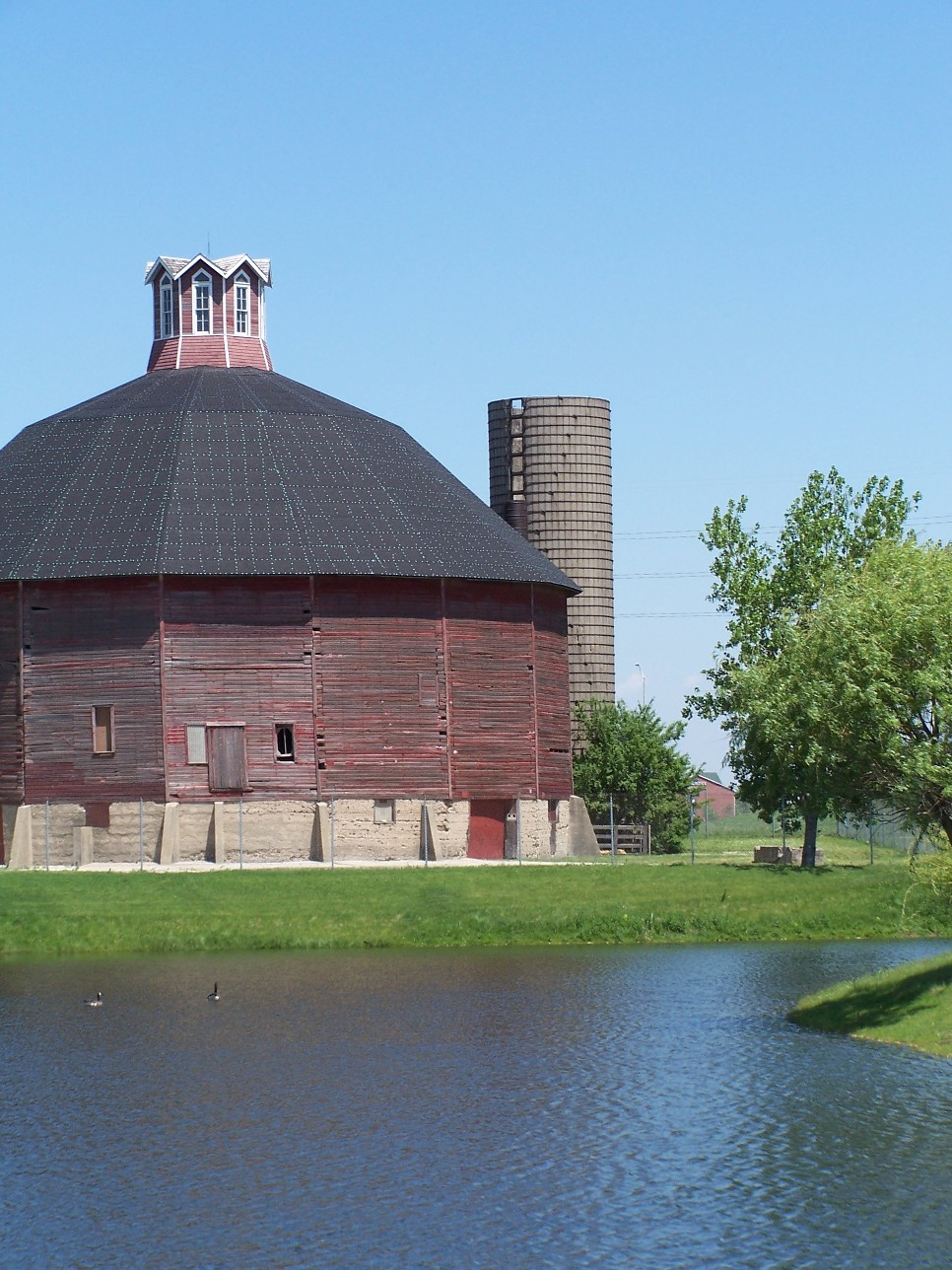
- Teeple Barn in 2005, two years before it collapsed in a storm

- Location within Illinois Location within the United States
- Nearest city: Randall Road, Elgin, Illinois
- Coordinates: 42°4′39″N 88°20′6″W
- Area: less than one acre
- Built: 1885
- Architect: W. W. Abell
- NRHP reference No.: 79000844

Significant dates
- Added to NRHP: December 10, 1979
- Removed from NRHP: January 2, 2020

Teeple Barn was a historic structure in Elgin, Illinois. It was a sixteen-sided barn designed by W. Wright Abell for Lester Teeple, a dairy farmer. In 1979, it was added to the National Register of Historic Places as the only surviving sixteen-sided barn in Illinois. The barn was destroyed on May 27, 2007, following a storm. It was delisted from the National Register in 2020.

== History ==
Lester Teeple was an early settler in the Elgin, Illinois, vicinity. He ordered the construction of the barn to store lumber in 1885. Teeple wanted to construct an octagon barn, a style typical in the area, particularly with Flemish immigrants. However, the lumber he intended to use to build it was not long enough to allow such a construction. W. Wright Abell was tasked with designing the barn, which was given sixteen sides instead of eight; the barn was his last known standing building. Teeple's farm provided dairy products to the Midwest. Hay would be distributed throughout the barn by a fork pulley system that allowed the hay to be dropped anywhere in the barn. Teeple Barn was renowned as the largest barn in the Elgin area, and one of the first designed with a professional architect. The barn remained in the Teeple family for over a hundred years, and was added to the National Register of Historic Places on December 10, 1979. In 1996, a non-profit group, AgTech, was created to restore the barn, and managed to restore the cupola in 1999. The group raised over $300,000 for repairs to the barn, which was the last sixteen-sided barn remaining in Illinois. On May 25, 2007, Teeple Barn was destroyed in a severe storm, and the remains were demolished a few days later.

Unlike an octagon barn, the silo was located outside the main structure. The interior of the barn featured X-bracing to support the many sides. The roof was supported by a Howe truss. The building was 85 feet (26 m) tall and had a diameter of 85 feet (26 m). A locally fired brick floor was laid on a fieldstone and concrete foundation. A red and white cupola topped the building until 1973, when a tornado struck the building; it was restored in 1999. Concrete buttresses were installed in 1952 to provide support for modern machinery.
