= Corron Farm =

Historic farm in Illinois, United States

- U.S. National Register of Historic Places
- U.S. Historic district
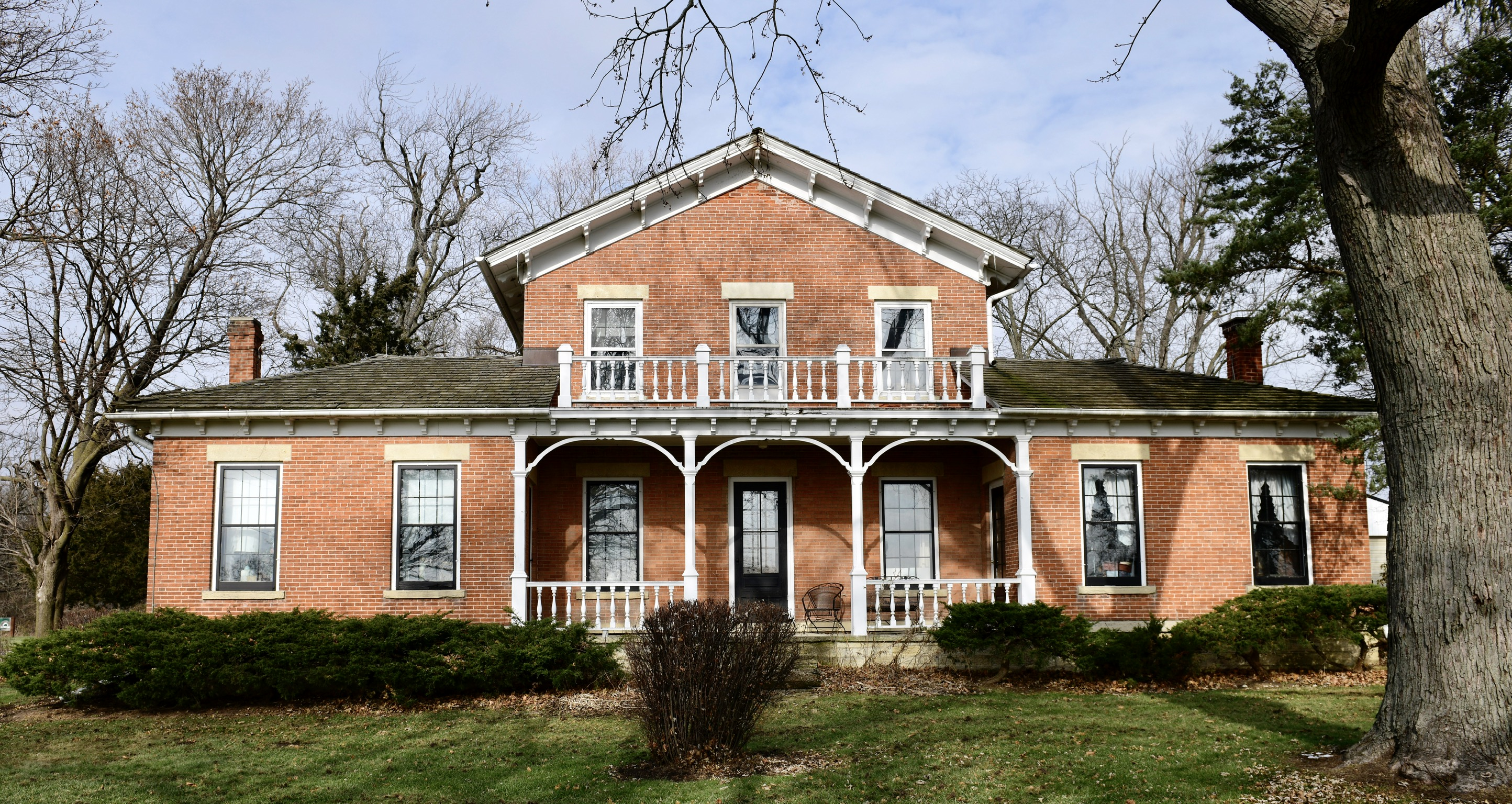
- The main farmhouse

- Location within Chicago metropolitan area Location within Illinois Location within the United States
- Location: 7N761 Corron Rd., Campton Township, Illinois
- Coordinates: 41°58′49″N 88°24′18″W
- Area: 220 acres (89 ha)
- NRHP reference No.: 100001925
- Added to NRHP: May 21, 2018

Corron Farm is a historic farm at 7N761 Corron Road in rural Campton Township, Kane County, Illinois. Robert Corron, who was one of Kane County's first settlers, claimed the farm in 1835 and gradually purchased its land from the government over the 1840s. Corron and his family originally lived in a log cabin on the site, but in the early 1850s they built a brick farmhouse; the house's design blends elements of the Italianate and Early Classical Revival styles. The farm also has a workers' house from the 1880s with an I-house plan, a common vernacular type in the Midwest at the time. Other buildings on the farm include a dairy barn with a silo, a horse barn, a hog house, a chicken coop and feed house, a milk house, and two corn cribs.

The farm was added to the National Register of Historic Places on May 21, 2018.
