= Judge Isaac Wilson House =

Historic house in Illinois, United States

- U.S. National Register of Historic Places
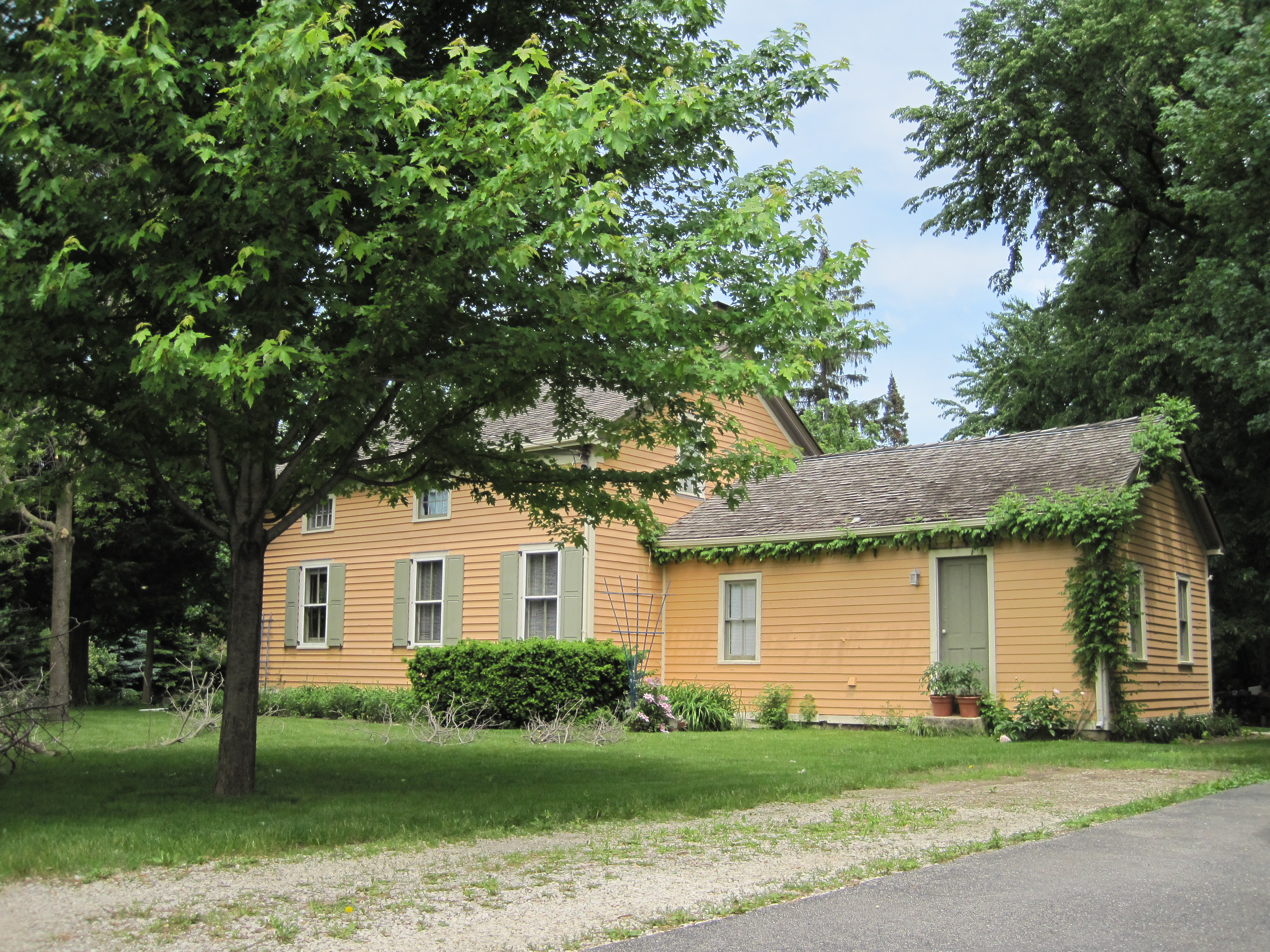
- Judge Isaac Wilson House in 2011

- Location within Illinois Location within the United States
- Location: 406 E. Wilson St. Batavia, Kane County, Illinois, United States
- Coordinates: 41°51′0″N 88°18′4″W
- Built: 1843
- Architectural style: Greek Revival
- NRHP reference No.: 85000978
- Added to NRHP: January 10, 1985

The Judge Isaac Wilson House is a historic residence in Batavia, Illinois. It was the home of Isaac Wilson, a former Congressman who moved to the Batavia region and later named the settlement. It was added to the National Register of Historic Places in 1985.

== History ==
Isaac Wilson moved from Batavia, New York to Batavia, Illinois in 1835, two years after the first settlers arrived in the area. He was previously the judge of the Genesee County Court and a member of the New York State Assembly. He was elected to the 18th United States Congress with the Democratic-Republican Party, supporting the Adams-Clay ticket. He was the first representative voted by New York's 29th congressional district. Wilson built a 14 by 16 feet (4.3 by 4.9 m) log cabin on his Batavia land claim. Isaac Wilson's only son Isaac Grant Wilson became a prominent judge in Kane County, earning the elder judge the nickname "Daddy" Wilson. Wilson named the growing settlement Batavia in 1840. A year later he was named the town's first postmaster, and he probably used his house as the post office.

The two-story house was constructed during Wilson's term as postmaster, in 1843. The lumber was produced locally with Batavia's sawmills. He lived in his house until his death in 1848. The house (and much of the surrounding neighborhood) remained with his heirs for many years. The Chicago and Aurora Railroad as built in 1850, and Wilson's descendants were able to board the train from their front lawn. The house was listed on the National Register of Historic Places on January 10, 1985.

The Judge Isaac Wilson house is a vernacular Greek Revival frame house. The entrance is on the north-northeast corner with a six-panel door. The main portion of the home is 23.5 by 30.25 feet (7.16 by 9.22 m) with eight double-hung sash windows on the first floor and three on the second. The floors are constructed with ash and chestnut lumbar. The southeast portion of the first floor was used as the fireplace room. A two-room basement lies beneath the first floor.
