= Geneva Country Day School =

- U.S. National Register of Historic Places
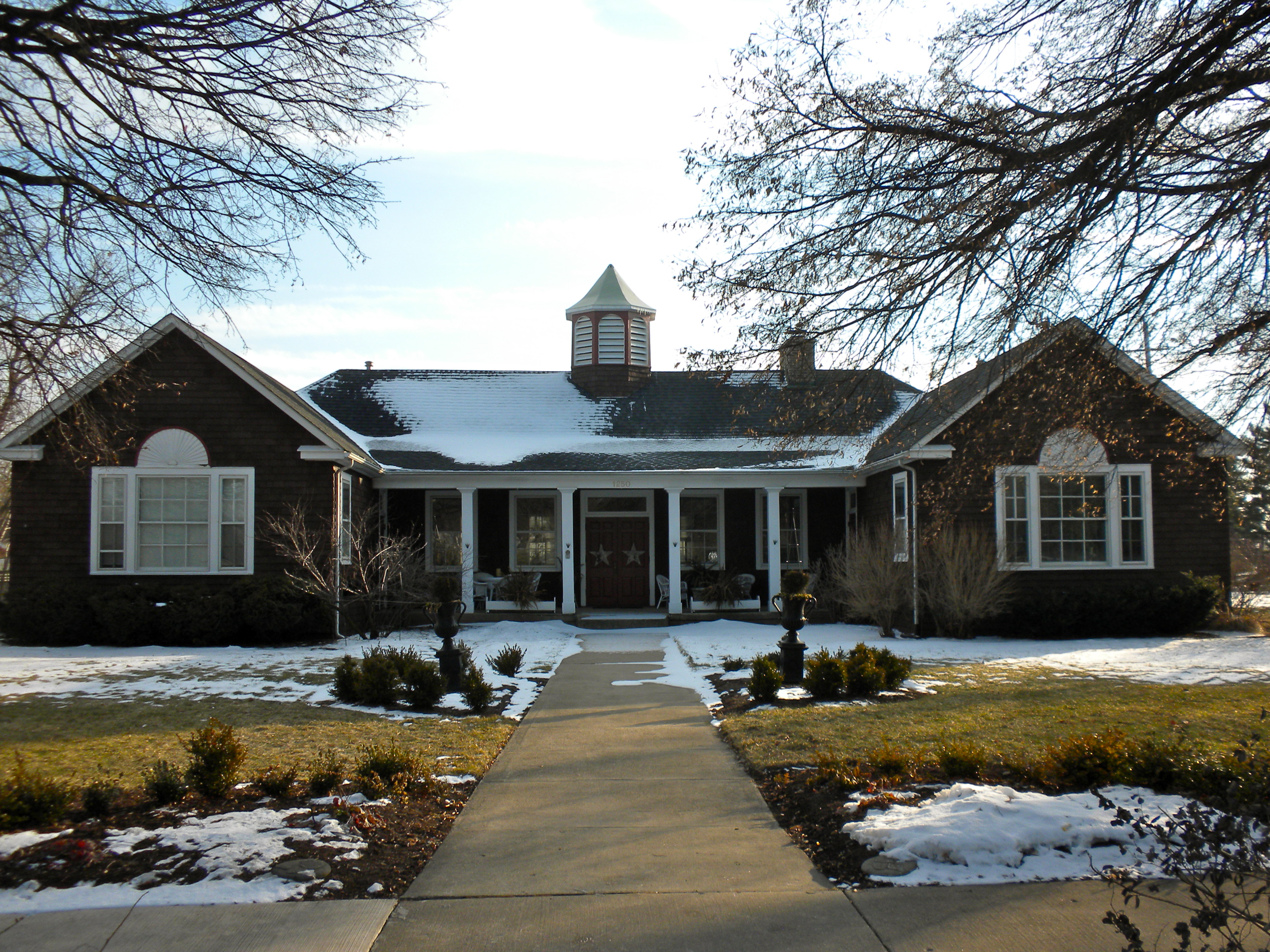
- The building as viewed from the north

- Location within Illinois Location within the United States
- Location: 1250 South St. Geneva, Illinois
- Coordinates: 41°53′00″N 88°19′13″W
- Area: 1.2 acres (0.49 ha)
- Built: 1927
- Architect: Holabird & Roche
- Architectural style: Late 19th and Early 20th Century Movements
- NRHP reference No.: 89001111
- Added to NRHP: August 21, 1989

Geneva Country Day School, also known as the Geneva Memorial Community Center, is an historic building in Geneva, Illinois. The school originated in the barn of Mr. and Mrs. William D. Bangs after they decided to tutor their sick son and his friends. Eventually this school, which they called the Adventure School, outgrew the barn and a new building was required. The Bangs family contracted Holabird & Roche to develop the building, and the new school opened in 1927. It served the community as a progressive school for 12 years, until it was forced to close due to low enrollment during the Great Depression. The building was added to the National Register of Historic Places in 1989.

== History ==
The building was erected as a school in 1927 and functioned as such until it was closed in 1939 due to the Great Depression. It was designed by the notable architectural firm of Holabird & Roche. It was designed to resemble a home to improve the comfort level of students. The Geneva Day School was an early adapter of the reformed school movement that saw teachers as guides instead of taskmasters. It was founded by the Bangs family; William D. Bangs was a general counsel for Illinois Bell. He held degrees from Princeton University and Harvard Law, and his wife from Vassar College. After their first child developed pneumonia, they home schooled him and his friends, calling it the "Adventure School". Word spread about the Adventure School, and soon several prominent local figures enrolled their children. Soon, over fifty students through grade 11 attended the classes.

The original 1919 barn used as a school became too small, leading to the construction of a new facility in 1927. William Bangs donated a tract of land across from a golf course for the new school building. Bangs was familiar with Holabird & Roche through Illinois Bell, so they were tasked with designing the building. The University of Chicago School of Education was consulted to design the school's strategy, help in design, and choose a principal. One of the students in the school was the son of a trustee for the university. The school grounds included a soccer and football field, a basketball court, a baseball diamond, and a playground.

The Geneva Country Day School attracted teachers skilled in various fields, including art and music, enabling the school to emphasize sportsmanship, workmanship, and social responsibility. However, it faced criticism for being perceived as elitist and sought to counter this by offering some free classes to younger students. In response, local public schools were motivated to compete and began providing more child-centered education. The school was forced to close in 1939 due to low enrollment stemming from the Great Depression. The building was added to the National Register of Historic Places on August 21, 1989. It was home to the Fox River Valley chapter of the Red Cross before being rezoned as a private residence.

== Architecture ==
The Geneva Country Day School is a one-story structure shaped like an H. It is wood framed with shingle siding. It measures 74 feet (23 m) by 55 feet (17 m) with an asphalt-shingled gable roof. A brick chimney rises on the west end of the middle section with an octagonal cupola with a copper roof. The building lies on the northernmost portion of the 4.8 acres (1.9 ha) lot. A library is in the center of the school with two classrooms on each side; each side corresponded to a different age group. Double hung windows line the library's north and south walls. A vaulted ceiling originally topped the library but has since been replaced by a flatter, more acoustic design. French doors connect the library to the classrooms. An additional French door on the north side connects the building an exterior porch, which has four columns. A terrace adjoined the building on the south side, accessed from the southern classrooms through French doors; however, most of this terrace his since been removed. In total, the building has forty-five double hung windows; thirty are six over six and fifteen are four over four. A basement, accessed through an exterior staircase, has more classrooms and bathrooms.

The building does not resemble any one architectural style, but is reminiscent of a bungalow or cottage. Aside from the removal of the terrace, the exterior of the building resembles what the building looked like in 1927. The interior is less preserved; the floor plan is intact, but floors have been carpeted and ceilings dropped.
