= LaSalle Street Auto Row Historic District =

Historic district in Illinois, United States

- U.S. National Register of Historic Places
- U.S. Historic district
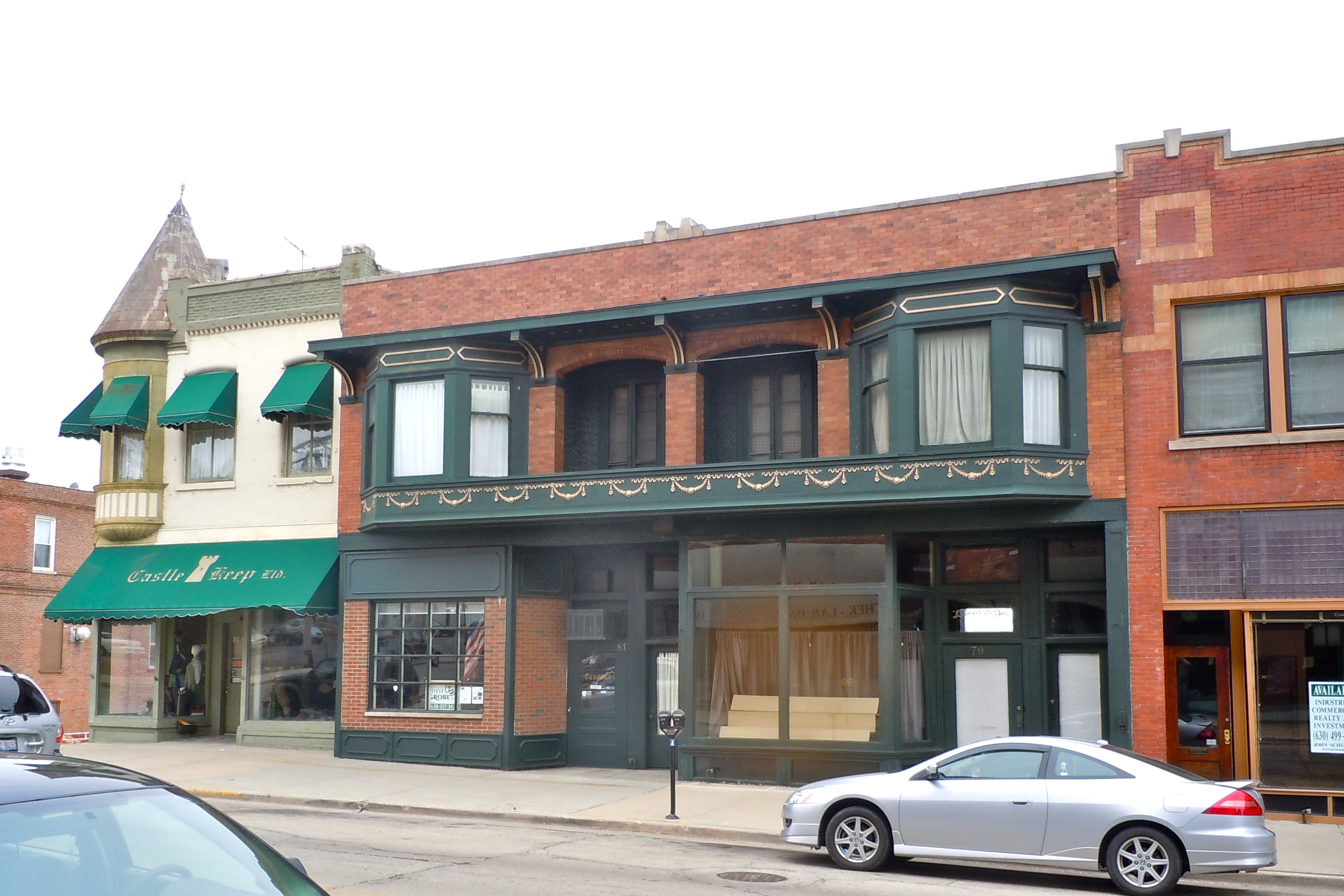

- Location within Illinois Location within the United States
- Location: 56-84 LaSalle St. and 57-83 S. LaSalle St., Aurora, Illinois
- Coordinates: 41°45′18″N 88°18′48″W
- Architectural style: Commercial Style
- NRHP reference No.: 96000856
- Added to NRHP: August 1, 1996

The LaSalle Street Auto Row Historic District is a set of fifteen buildings in Aurora, Illinois. The buildings reflect the growth of automobile retail in Aurora in the early 20th century.

== History ==
As demand for automobiles grew, dealerships opened to more easily provide consumers with product. Originally reserved for the rich, automobiles became a reality for middle-class families in the early 1900s.

The first major concentration of automobile dealerships was on Broadway Street. As commercial demand increased for land on the street, the automakers moved their dealerships to cheaper land one block east, to LaSalle Street. The LaSalle Street Auto Row was still in the heart of the city, a trend typical of cities at the time.

The first commercial structure related to automobile retail was the Coates Garage at 52-54 S. LaSalle. By 1912, the street was already strongly associated with automobile retail. Between 1912 and 1921, LaSalle Street saw an increase of three automobile businesses to fifteen. Among the represented companies were Studebaker, Velie, Overland Automobile, and Buick. All of the buildings were built in the Commercial Style, the major architectural style for commercial buildings at the turn of the century. This style of architecture lacked the ornamentation of the previous Victorian-era structures.

LaSalle Street was a major automobile center until the mid-1920s, as other commercial enterprises purchased the lots. By 1952, only two automobile-related structures remained in use on LaSalle Street. Although the buildings no longer harbored automobile-related businesses, 70% of them were used for other purposes and were not demolished. Restorations in the 1990s installed early 1900s-era storefront windows in the district where they had been removed. The district was added to the National Register of Historic Places on August 1, 1996.
