= Spring–Douglas Historic District =

Historic district in Illinois, United States

- Spring-Douglas Historic District
- U.S. National Register of Historic Places
- U.S. Historic district
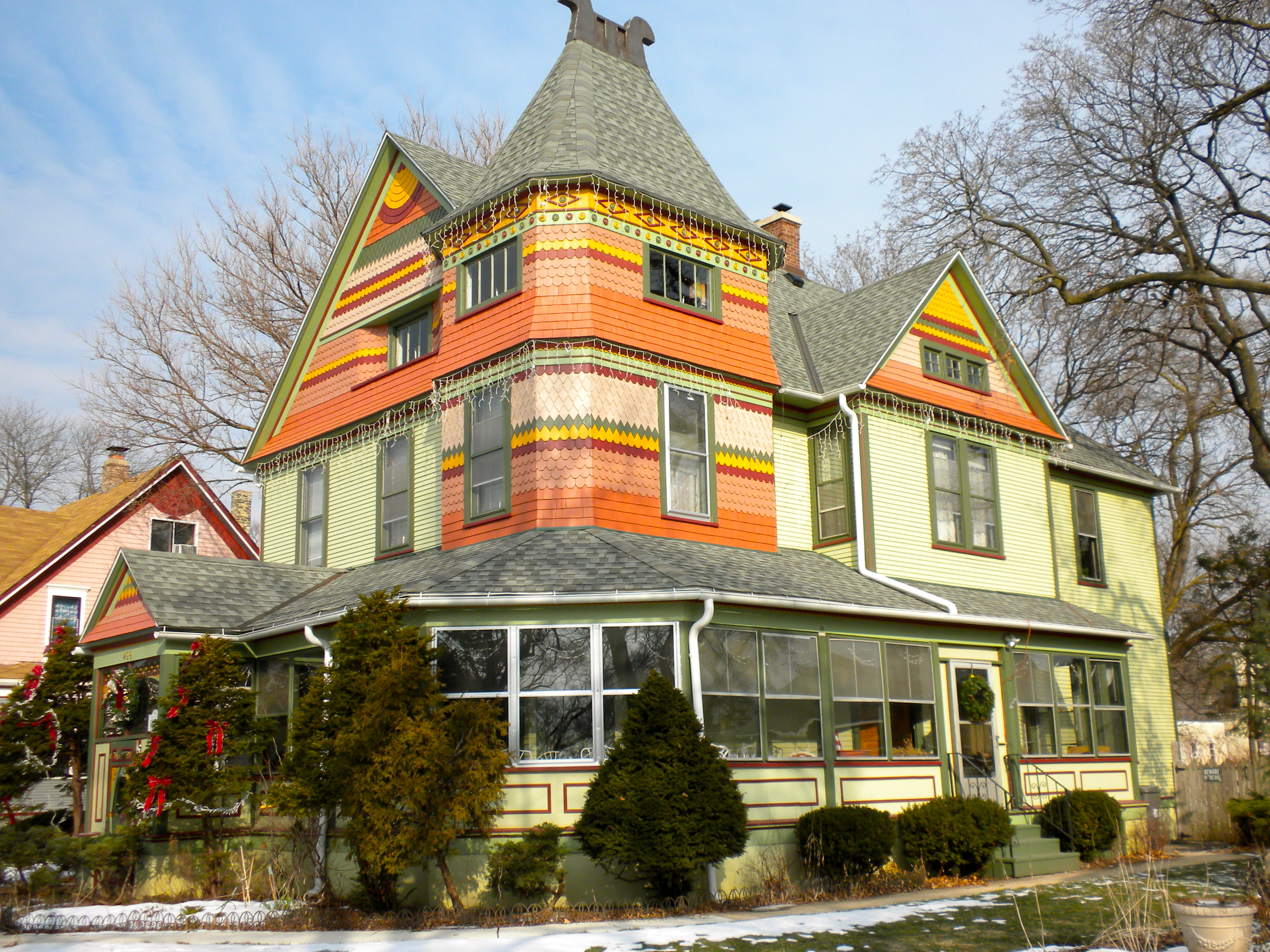
- A house in the Spring-Douglas Historic District

- Location within Illinois Location within the United States
- Location: Roughly Spring St. and Douglas Ave., between River Bluff Rd. and Kimball Ave., Elgin, Illinois
- Coordinates: 42°3′3″N 88°17′4″W
- Area: 93.7 acres (37.9 ha)
- Architect: Abell, W.W.; Postle, David M.
- Architectural style: Bungalow, American Craftsman, Classical Revival, Colonial Revival, Italianate, Mission Revival, Spanish Colonial Revival
- NRHP reference No.: 00000410
- Added to NRHP: April 28, 2000

The Spring–Douglas Historic District is a set of 496 buildings in Elgin, Illinois. Of those, 455 buildings contribute to the district's historical value. It is a residential district following Spring Street and Douglas Avenue from Kimball Street in the south to River Bluff Road to the north. The lands that now comprise the district were originally settled by Phineas J. Kimball and Vincent Lovell in the 1830s. Kimball's property eventually became the southern part of the district, which mostly housed working-class citizens. Lovell's subdivisions became housing for wealthier managers and doctors. The lower district is noted for its vernacular architecture, mostly gablefront houses, while the upper district represents a wide array of late 19th and early 20th century styles, mostly Queen Anne.

== History ==
Elgin, Illinois was first settled in 1835. Located on the Fox River, it was an important site for travelers on the Galena-Chicago trail. The land that now comprises the residential district was originally claimed by Phineas J. Kimball and Vincent Lovell, two of Elgin's earliest settlers. Kimball was the brother of Elgin's second settler, Joseph Kimball, who had claimed the west side of the river to build a mill. Phineas Kimball's property was immediately to the east of his brother's, and he soon built a cabin at what is now the northwest corner of Douglas Avenue and Kimball Road. Douglas Avenue was paved on the west side of the plots, and Spring Street was laid on the east side, both roads traveling north and south.

The oldest portions of the district are on the southern end, between Kimball Street and Franklin Street. These houses were mostly vernacular and served the lower class. Elgin's first major commercial development was opened in the 1840s a few blocks to the south at Chicago Avenue, making the southern portion of the district attractive to the working class. In anticipation of the 1850 completion of the Galena and Chicago Union Railroad through Elgin, Kimball subdivided most of the southern portion of his property into residential developments. Initially, the subdivision did not grow as expected, with only twelve houses built by 1860. However, the 1864 opening of the Elgin National Watch Company caused a great demand for working class housing. A wagonway was extended to the district from the Watch Company, making it a convenient choice for workers.

Vincent Lovell was a merchant who settled in Elgin in 1837, purchasing 160 acres (65 ha) east of the river. Lovell was an important figure in the founding of the Elgin Academy, although he did not live long enough to witness its opening. The area of land between Douglas and Spring, and north of Jefferson Avenue to River Bluff Road was recorded as Lovell's Addition in 1868. Elgin's population skyrocketed in the 1880s, further increasing residential demand. The wagonway was also extended north to Slade Avenue in 1881. Nine years later, the wagonway was replaced by an electric streetcar that ran all the way north to River Bluff Road.

German immigrant William Grote was the first major real estate developer in the north district and also persuaded several industries to locate in Elgin. He co-developed Grote and Waldron's Second Addition in 1881 on the east side of Spring Street between Lincoln and Slade Avenues, which was directly advertised to those working at the factories he lured. Immediately north of this development was owned by fruit grower Steven Slade, who developed a residential district there in 1881. The Lovell family owned the land to the west of these developments, which became a popular picnic location. Lovell's descendants eventually recorded these areas as residential developments in 1893 (Jefferson to Slade Ave.) and 1913 (north of Slade Ave.). Unlike the southern portion of the district, the northern part features more ornate styles of architecture. These buildings were mostly erected for prosperous Elgin citizens between 1868 and 1913, and thus reflect popular architectural trends of the time. The northern part of the district provided homes for dentists and physicians from Sherman Hospital.

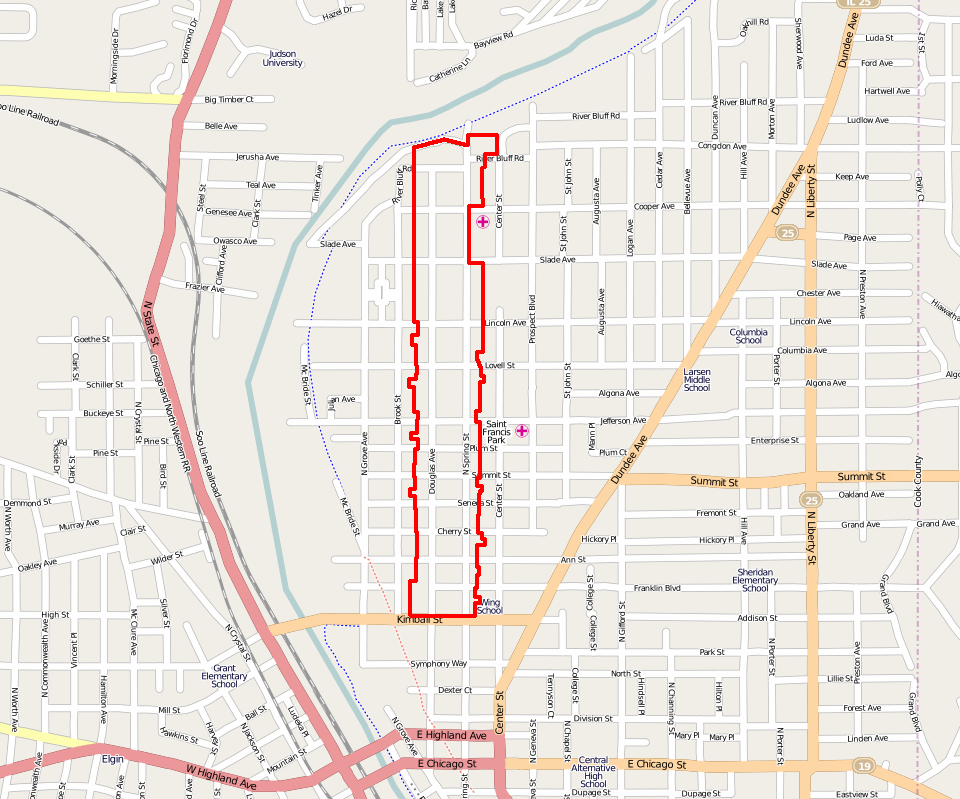
Location of the Spring-Douglas Historic District (red outline) within Elgin.

The earliest residences in the district are mostly gablefront houses in the southern district. There are thirty-one typical gablefront houses, twenty-one Gable Ell designs, nineteen Cross-Forms, eight L-forms, and five T-forms. The most common style of house in the northern district is Queen Anne, with forty-eight examples. The Shingle Style is represented with eleven buildings and the Italianate style with twelve. As architectural trends changed in the early 20th century, so did new buildings in the district. Such buildings include six Dutch Colonials, three Neoclassicals, and three Tudor Revivals. Most of these builds are on the 800-1000 blocks of Douglas Ave. Twentieth century trends are also noticed in the southern district, with fourteen Foursquares, four bungalows, and three ranch houses. The majority of the district is single-family housing, although there are fifteen multi-family residences, including eight apartment buildings. A gas station and a Salvation Army building fall within the district but are considered non-contributing.
