= Louise White School =

- U.S. National Register of Historic Places
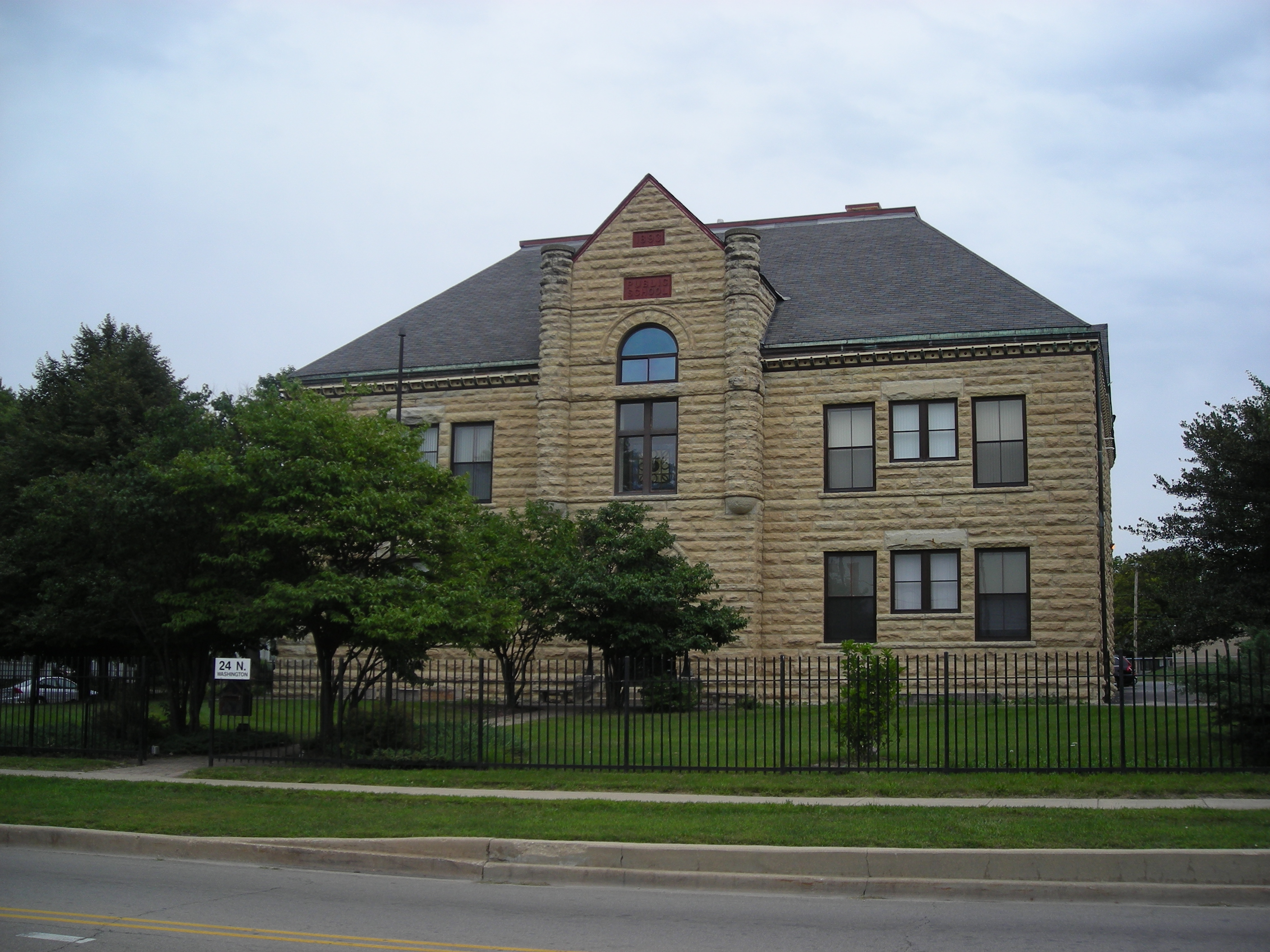
- Location: Batavia, Kane County, Illinois, United States
- Coordinates: 41°51′03″N 88°18′15″W
- Built: 1893
- Architectural style: Romanesque
- NRHP reference No.: 80001373
- Added to NRHP: November 7, 1980

The Louise White School is a Registered Historic Place in Batavia, Illinois. It was in active use as a school for 85 years, and served as home of the Chautauqua movement in north central Illinois.

== History ==
The Louise White School was one of the main schools in the settlement of Batavia from its construction in 1893 through the 1970s. It was built to replace a wood-frame school that was built in 1856 but destroyed in an 1893 fire. The school was the regional home of the Chatauqua movement. Like most Chatauqua establishments, the school hosted many notable traveling lecturers. The building is considered a good example of Romanesque Revival architecture and was listed on the National Register of Historic Places on November 7, 1980. The school building currently houses TSN International, a travel vacation club which has been the primary tenant since 1992.

The two-story limestone building is rectangular and situated on a hill east of the Fox River. Each story had four classrooms. The main entrance to the building faces the west and feature a limestone arch typical of the architectural style. The building also features an attic with a 20 foot (6.1 m) high ceiling beneath a 45 degree hip roof. The 8 foot (2.4 m) windows are an early example of insulated glazing. A two-story yellow brick extension was added in 1927, connected to the main building though a limestone passage.
