= Ora Pelton House =

Historic house in Illinois, United States

- U.S. National Register of Historic Places
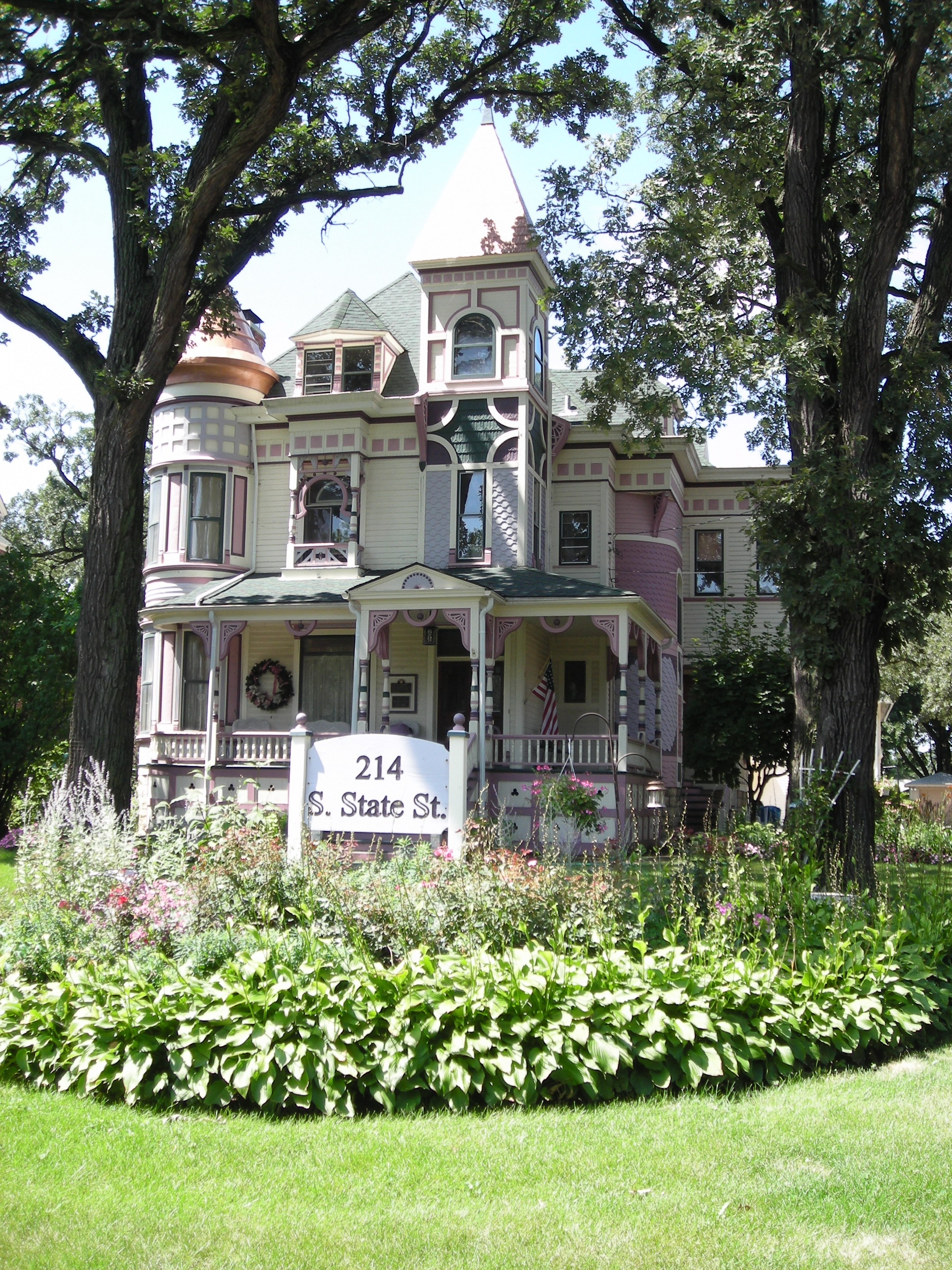

- Location within Illinois Location within the United States
- Location: 214 S. State St. Elgin, Illinois
- Coordinates: 42°1′49″N 88°17′1″W
- Area: 0.4 acres (0.16 ha)
- Built: 1889
- Architect: Gilbert M. Turnbull
- Architectural style: Stick-Eastlake
- NRHP reference No.: 82002548
- Added to NRHP: August 12, 1982

The Ora Pelton House, or the Izzo-Pelton House, is a historic residence in Elgin, Illinois. The Stick-Eastlake residence is the only Victorian house remaining on South State Street, formerly a wealthy area. It was built for Ora Pelton, a physician and surgeon, by local architect Gilbert M. Turnbull. It was added to the National Register of Historic Places in 1982.

== History ==
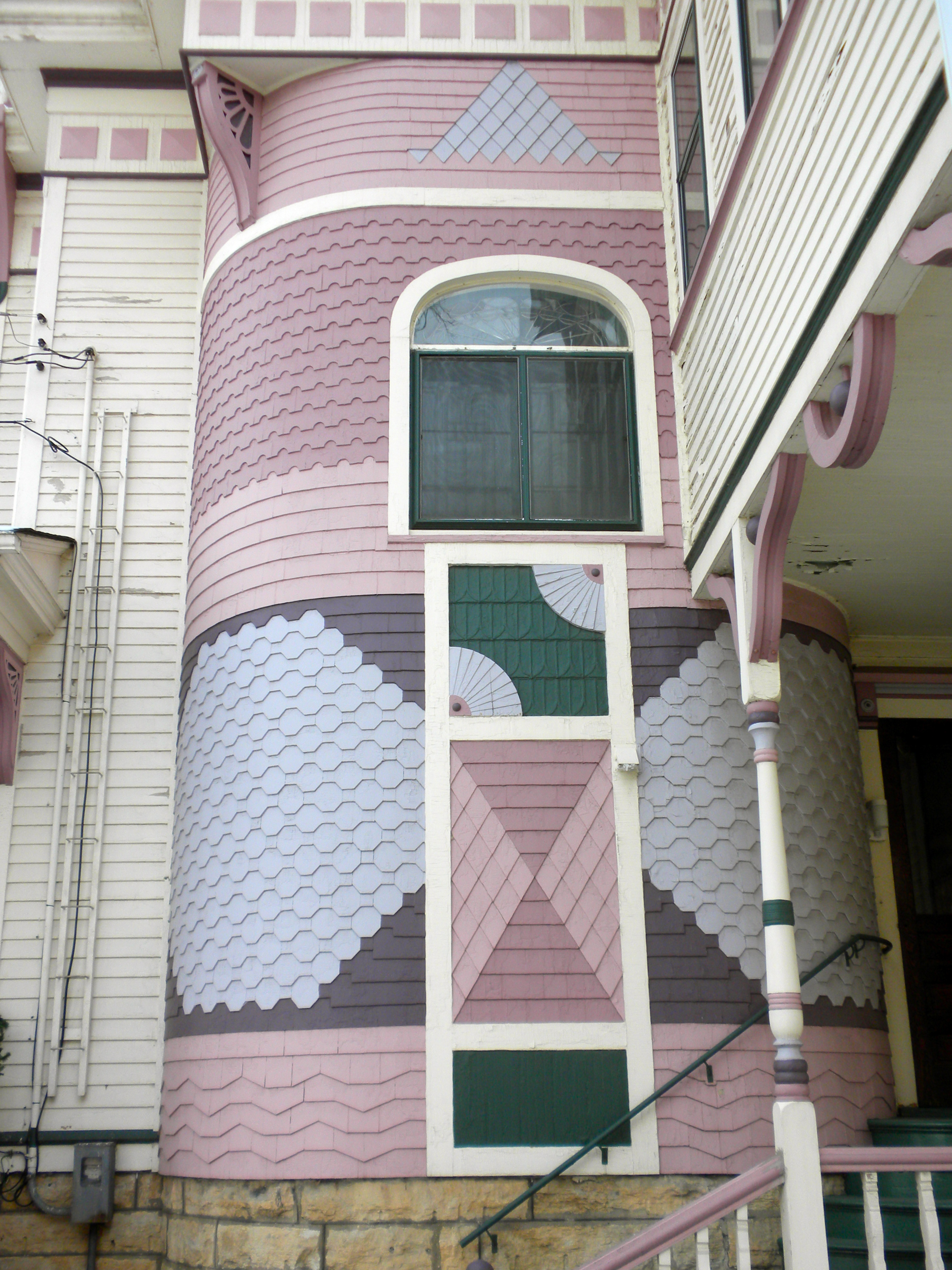
Detail of the Ora Pelton House, probably the main stairwell

Dr. Ora A. Pelton Sr. was a physician who practiced in Elgin, Illinois. He also worked as a surgeon and was known for his long career. In 1889, he commissioned architect Gilbert M. Turnbull to design his house on South State Street. At the time, this was an area of wealthy residents along the Fox River. The house was designed with Stick-Eastlake architectural elements. The house has remained in the hands of only two families since its construction: the Pelton family to 1955, and the Izzo family since. The house was listed on the National Register of Historic Places on August 12, 1982.

The rectangular, three-story house is laid on a stone foundation. It features many aspects typical of the Queen Anne Style, but its comparative austerity is typical of Stick-Eastlake designs. Porch columns and the second floor balcony are particularly representative of the Eastlake Movement. The only significant change to the exterior is a 1920s one-story addition on the southwest corner of the house. A carriage house, built in 1890, still stands in the backyard.

On the interior, the oak staircase in the foyer was laid against a wall with glass windows to the exterior. A Czech chandelier hangs over the staircase. The parlor has an interlocking parquet hardwood floor. Fireplaces are present in the parlor and two second-floor bedrooms. Each room in the house is floored with a different kind of wood: oak in the main hall and stairway, birch in the parlors, sycamore in the dining room, bird's-eye maple in the office, yellow leaf pine in the kitchen, and gum wood in the bedrooms.
