= St. Mary's Church of Gilberts =

Historic church in Illinois, United States

- U.S. National Register of Historic Places
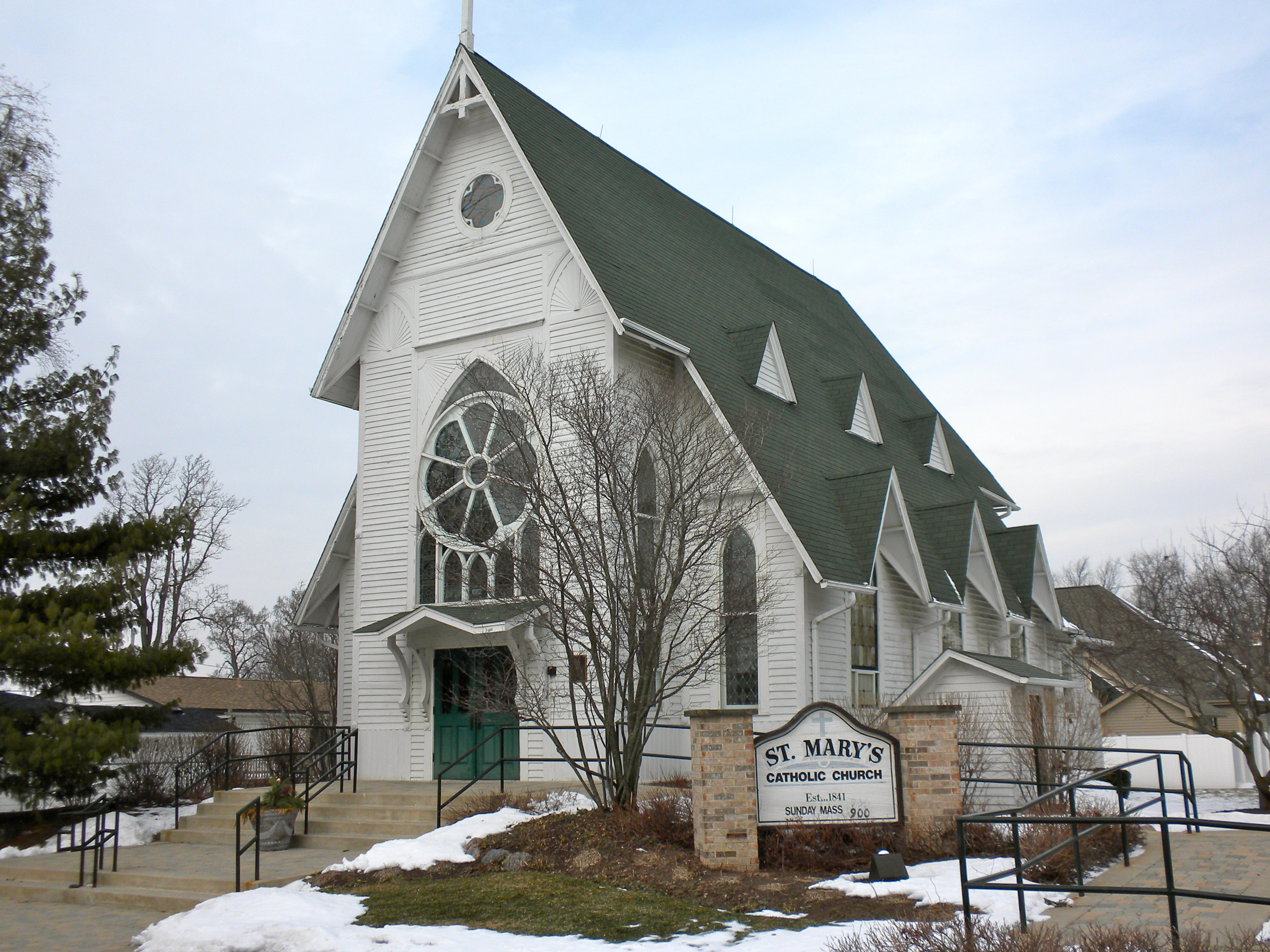
- St. Mary's Church of Gilberts in 2010

- Location within Illinois Location within the United States
- Location: Gilberts, Kane County, Illinois, United States
- Coordinates: 42°6′22″N 88°22′29″W
- Built: 1882
- Architect: Oliver Kelley
- Architectural style: Stick Style
- NRHP reference No.: 92001018
- Added to NRHP: August 18, 1992

St. Mary's Church of Gilberts is a historic church in Gilberts, Illinois. The Catholic church was built for the increasing population in the town in the late 19th century. The church is an excellent example of the rural Stick Style designs that some churches developed in the 1880s. It was listed on the National Register of Historic Places in 1992.

== History ==
Gilberts, Illinois developed shortly after the construction of the Chicago and North Western Railroad in 1851. An early increase in the number of Catholic locals required the construction of a much larger Catholic church. A church (the second Gilberts church with the St. Mary's name) was demolished in 1882 to make room for a new one. The present St. Mary's Church of Gilberts was built later that year at a cost of $2,800, using some of the materials from the previous church. A local carpenter, Oliver Kelly, designed and built the church in the Stick Style. Uncertainty remains about how the church leaders decided on that style, but it may have been due to pattern books distributed to church leaders in the late 19th century. It was listed on the National Register of Historic Places on August 18, 1992.

== Architecture ==
The church was built on the northwest corner of Mattesen St. and Union St. (now Galligan Rd.). The design of the church is consistent with rural interpretations of the Stick Style. The front of the one-story church faces the southeast. The rectangular frame structure features a steep gable roof but no steeple. This asphalt shingle roof is accentuated with dormers and window hoods and has wide eaves on either side. Large stained glass rose windows adorn the front and rear ends of the church, each with a large pointed arch above it and five smaller window arches below it. The front and two sides have additional stained glass windows with pointed arch openings. The front side had an additional quatrefoil window in the gable. Concrete steps with iron railings lead to the entrance, which features oak paneled double doors. Additional doorways are located on the east and north sides; the east doorway is the only entrance to the basement, which was built in the 1950s.

The interior resembles a simple basilica with a high nave, a vestibule, and low aisles. A stairway on the left leads to the choir loft. A second set of wooden doors separated the vestibule from the rest of the interior. The interior walls are covered with plaster in shades of yellow. Statues, the altar table, and the tabernacle were restored in 1990. The altar is painted white with gold trim. The floor is pine, covered with linoleum under the pews and with carpet and sanctuary.
