= Hobbs Building =

- U.S. National Register of Historic Places
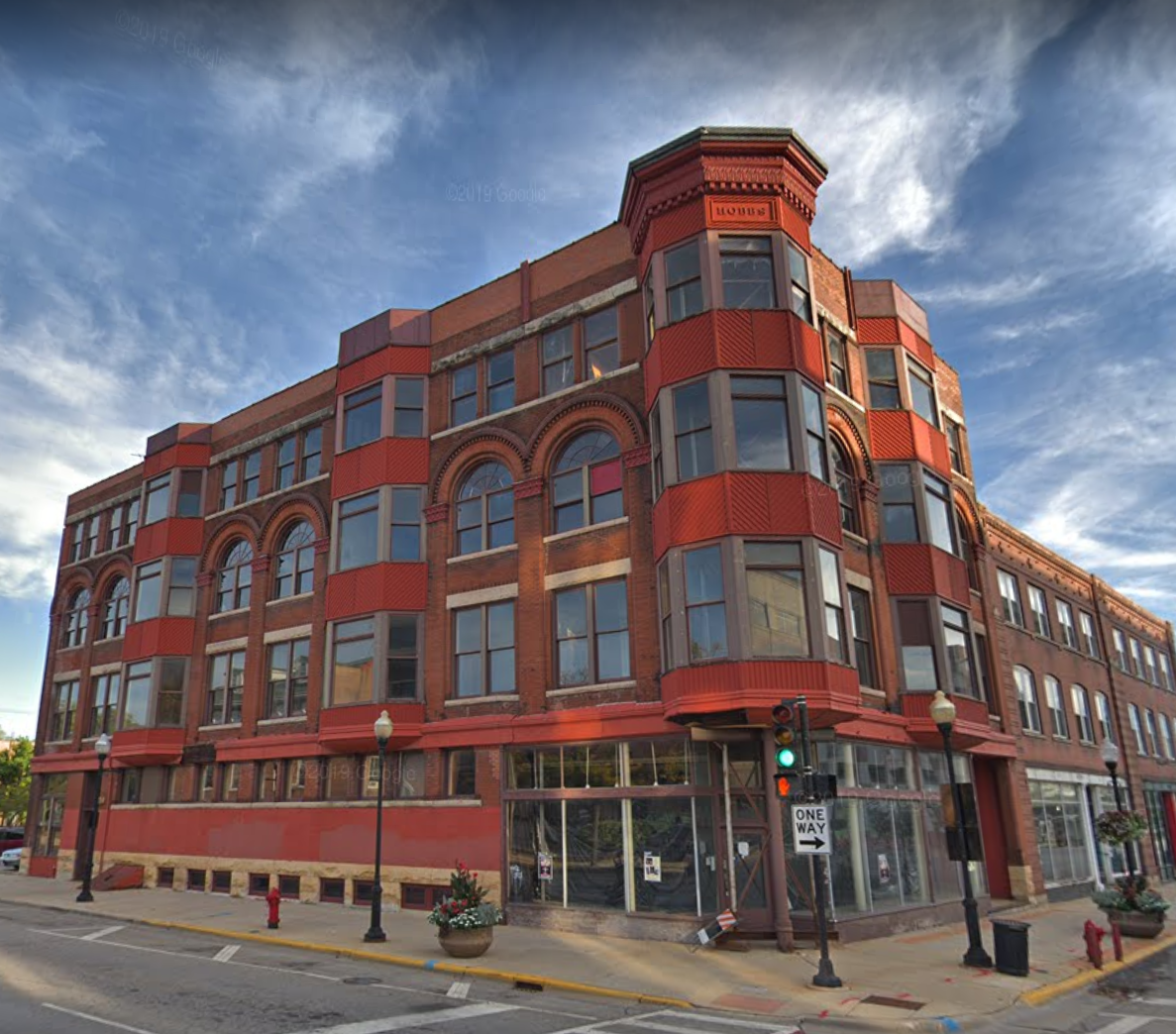

- Location within Chicago metropolitan area Location within Illinois Location within the United States
- Location: 2-4 North River St., Aurora, Illinois
- Coordinates: 41°45′33″N 88°19′00″W
- Built: 1895
- Built by: Levi Hull Waterhouse
- Architect: James E. Minott
- Architectural style: Romanesque Revival
- NRHP reference No.: 100006645
- Added to NRHP: June 17, 2021

The Hobbs Building is a historic commercial building at 2-4 North River Street in Aurora, Illinois. Albert Hobbs, a businessman and local civic leader, had the building constructed in 1895 for his furniture and undertaking businesses. Architect James E. Minott gave the building a Richardsonian Romanesque design which incorporated elements of the Queen Anne style. The four-story building has a five-sided turret on its front corner and several multi-story bay windows on its street-facing facades; the turret was originally topped by an onion dome. The building's design also includes arched windows with decorative brickwork, limestone windowsills and lintels, and ornamental terra cotta. Hobbs operated his furniture store in the building until his death in 1926; the building has had several owners since then, most of them other stores, but has been vacant since 1990.

In 2019 JH Real Estate purchased the building and completely renovated it. In 2022 they welcomed their first residents.

The building was added to the National Register of Historic Places on June 17, 2021.

For a 1910 Fourth of July Celebration, a man jumped off the top of the dome into a 6ft pool of water.
