= Memorial Washington Reformed Presbyterian Church =

Historic church in Illinois, United States

- U.S. National Register of Historic Places
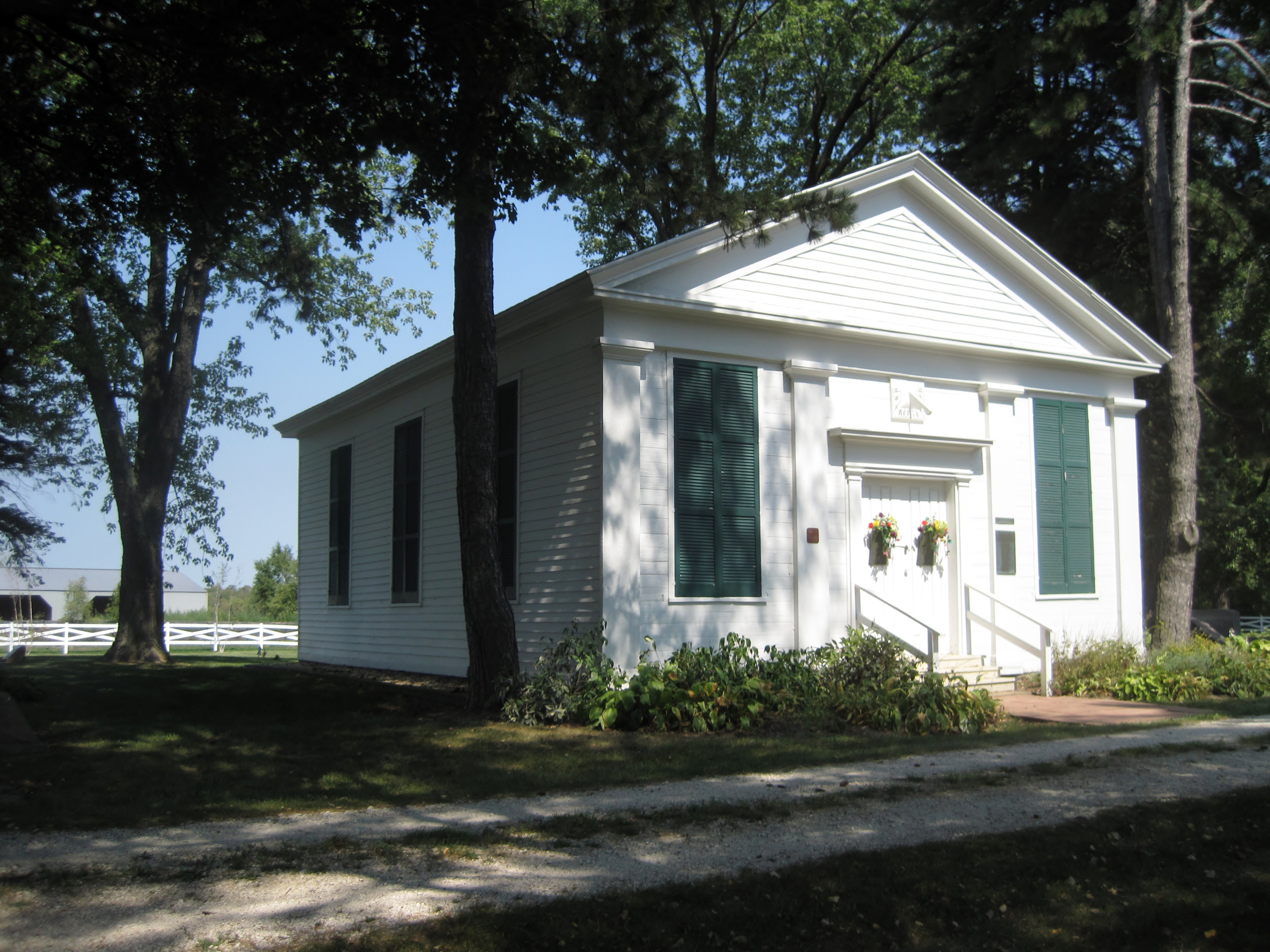

- Location within Illinois Location within the United States
- Location: W. Highland Avenue, Elgin, Illinois
- Coordinates: 42°3′51″N 88°23′28″W
- Area: less than one acre
- Built: 1844
- Architect: William and Daniel Fraser
- Architectural style: Greek Revival
- NRHP reference No.: 80001376
- Added to NRHP: November 19, 1980

Memorial Washington Reformed Presbyterian Church is a historic church in Elgin, Illinois. It was built in 1844, but has not had regular service since 1906. Due to the infrequency of services, the church earned the moniker The Once-A-Year Church. The simple, vernacular Greek Revivalchurch building was added to the National Register of Historic Places in 1980.

== History ==
The church building was designed by William and Daniel Fraser, who modeled it after a church they previously attended in Scotland. It was built in 1844 by Scottish and Scots-Irish immigrants, many of which became the church's first members. The church last held regular services on September 9, 1906. Descendants of the early church members organized a committee in 1916 to oversee the care of the church and its adjacent cemetery. This organization holds the only services in the building, a once-a-year gathering of its members every June. This unusual trait earned the church the nickname "The Once-A-Year Church". The church building was added to the National Register of Historic Places on November 19, 1980.

The building is rectangular and 24.33 by 38.33 feet (7.42 by 11.68 m). The church was originally laid on a wooden foundation; the present stone foundation dates to the 1860s. It is best described as a vernacular Greek Revival building. The east and west facades each feature three double sash windows with green shutters. The main entrance is on the south, flanked by pilasters. The double doorway features a standard wooden cornice lintel, above which is a carved sundial. The south facade also features two windows similar to those on the east and west. The north side features no windows. The inside features one room with its original unfinished wooden floor. The pews and pulpit are also original. A bronze memorial tablet was added near the entrance in 1924.
