= Andrew Weisel House =

Historic house in Illinois, United States

- U.S. National Register of Historic Places
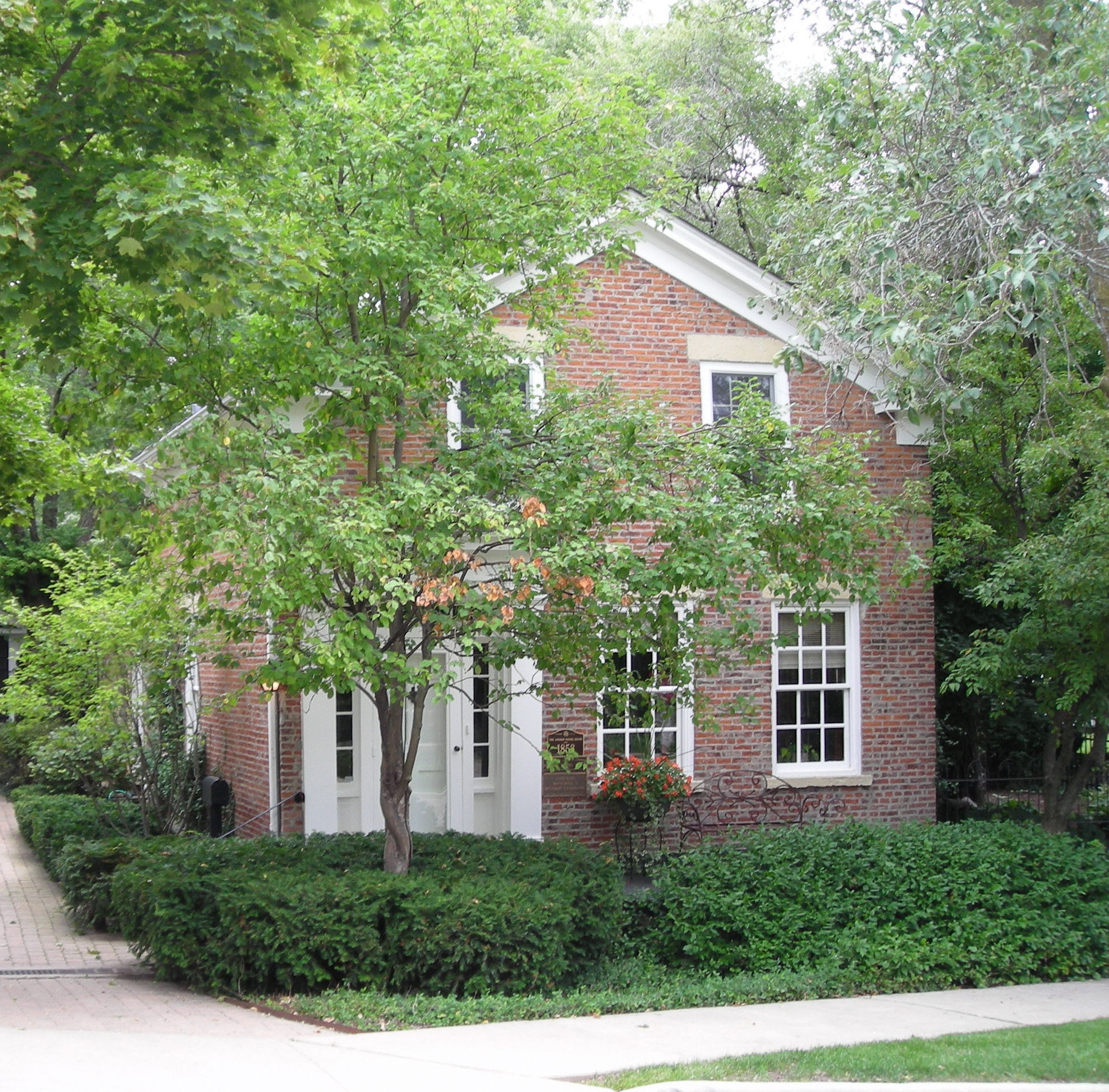
- Location: St Charles, Kane County, Illinois, United States
- Coordinates: 41°54′59.27″N 88°18′41.78″W
- Built: 1853
- Architect: Weisel, Andrew
- Architectural style: Greek Revival
- NRHP reference No.: 82002550
- Added to NRHP: February 26, 1982

The Andrew Weisel House is a two-story Greek Revival cottage constructed of red brick and river stone. It was built in 1853 by mason Andrew Weisel and added to the National Register of Historic Places in 1982.

== History ==
The Andrew Weisel House is a small Greek Revival cottage constructed from brick and river stone. Weisel was a stonemason born in 1882 in Germany who immigrated to St. Charles, Illinois in 1846. He probably worked for William Beith, the most prominent mason in St. Charles, who designed many residential and commercial structures in those times. Weisel married Beith's sister Isabella, and built this house for their family in 1853. The house was placed on the crest of a hill to gain a good vantage point of the Fox River. Weisel lived there until 1867, when he bought a farm on the other side of the river. The house was listed on the National Register of Historic Places on February 26, 1982.

== Architecture ==
The riverstone is mostly used on the east elevation. The house is two stories tall, otherwise constructed with red brick. Windows and doors have stone lintels. The main entrance is on the west, though the door has been replaced with a paneled door. A second entrance on the east side has not been recently changed, though it is uncertain if it is original. On the south side, the porch has been fully enclosed with a batten wall and now served as a library and bathroom. All windows and door locations are original, with the exception of one window on the east end that has been enlarged.

The first floor features a stair hall, with three rooms on the north end, and a kitchen (plus the aforementioned library) on the south end. The staircase and its newel post and handrail are original. The original pine floors remain, but have been covered with oak flooring. Most walls and ceilings have been painted white. The second floor has three bedrooms and a main hall. These pine floors were also covered with oak. One bedroom has since been converted to a bathroom, and most walls and ceilings were painted white.
