= Sydney Morton =

American actress, dancer, and singer (born 1985)

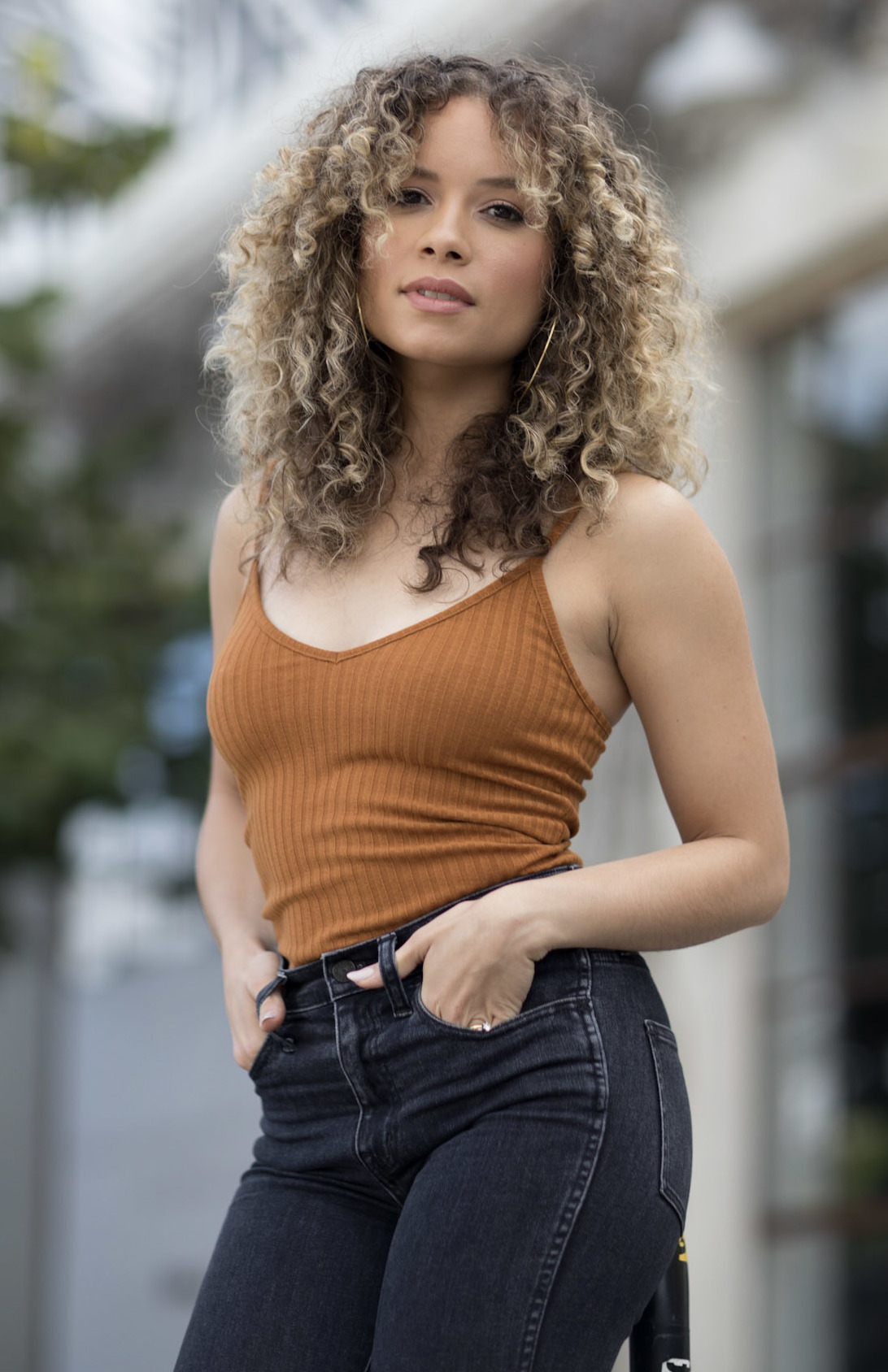
- Born: 1985 (age 40–41); Cincinnati, Ohio
- Occupations: Actor; dancer; singer
- Website: sydneymorton.com

Sydney Morton (born 1985) is an American stage and television actress, singer and dancer.

== Early life and education ==
According to Morton, her maternal grandfather appeared on Broadway in 1933 in Run, Little Chillun, an all-Black revue, and her paternal grandfather danced professionally during the Harlem Renaissance. Neither of her parents are in the entertainment industry; Morton told an interviewer "it skipped a generation."

Morton began dancing at 4. She graduated from Sycamore High School in Cincinnati in 2004. While in school she danced for the College-Conservatory of Music, the Cincinnati Ballet and the Cincinnati Pops Orchestra. She attended the University of Michigan, graduating in 2008 with a degree in musical theatre. She studied at the Royal Academy of Dramatic Art and the Upright Citizens Brigade.

== Career ==
=== Television ===
Morton played a recurring character in Spike Lee's She's Gotta Have It. She appeared opposite Octavia Spencer in Netflix's miniseries Self Made: Inspired by the Life of Madam C. J. Walker. She had a recurring part in NBC's Manifest. In 2021 she was cast as Meghan Markle, opposite Jordan Dean, in the title roles in Lifetime's Harry & Meghan: Escaping The Palace which began production in May 2021 and appeared in fall of 2021.

=== Stage ===
She was a member of the original Broadway cast of Memphis, working as a swing to cover eight tracks or roles, including those of both white and Black performers. She was also a member of the original Broadway cast of Motown the 2012 revival of Evita. She played Alex in the US touring company of Flashdance. She appeared previously opposite Dean in the original Broadway cast of American Psycho. She played the title role in An Octoroon in the 2017 Berkeley Repertory production. In February and March 2020 she appeared opposite Billy Harrigan Tighe in the pre-Broadway tryout of The Secret of My Success at the Paramount Theatre; the production was cut short by the coronavirus pandemic.

Morton discussed her work in Memphis as a musical theatre swing and understudy in Robert Simonson's Performance of the Century (2012), saying that the swing's biggest challenge is to participate without causing a significant change from other performances. In Memphis she covered eight tracks or roles, including those of both white and Black performers.

=== Film ===
Morton was cast in the 2023 comedy-drama A Good Person.

== Personal life ==
As of 2021 Morton lived in Manhattan with her husband, fellow actor Preston Boyd. They have one daughter.
