= The Secret of My Success (musical) =

2020 American musical comedy play

- Official promotional art
- Music: Michael Mahler and Alan Schmuckler
- Lyrics: Michael Mahler and Alan Schmuckler
- Book: Gordon Greenberg and Steve Rosen
- Setting: New York City
- Basis: The Secret of My Success (1987 film)
- Premiere: February 21, 2020: Paramount Theatre (Aurora, Illinois)

The Secret of My Success is a musical comedy play based on the 1987 movie of the same name starring Michael J. Fox. Music is by Michael Mahler and Alan Schmuckler and book by Gordon Greenberg and Steve Rosen.

== Development ==
Development started in 2013 when Universal Theatrical Group, which holds the rights to the 1987 film, greenlighted the project. A 2018 reading cast Chris Dwan (Brantley Foster/Carlton Whitfield) and Lilli Cooper (Christy Lockhart) as leads. A 2020 premiere was announced in February 2019 and casting finalized in January 2020.

== Production ==
The musical was mid-run for its world premiere and pre-Broadway tryout at the Paramount Theatre in March 2020 with Sydney Morton (Christy Lockhart) and Billy Harrigan Tighe (Brantley Foster/Carlton Whitfield) as leads and Greenberg directing when production was shut down due to the coronavirus pandemic. It had been scheduled to run from February 21 – March 29, and the final performance was March 12, as Illinois governor J. B. Pritzker shut down all performance venues starting March 13.

In 2022, the musical was remounted at the Hobby Center for the Performing Arts by Theatre Under The Stars in Houston, Texas.

== Reception ==
Reviews of the pre-Broadway tryout were generally positive, though most were at least initially puzzled by the choice of source material. Chicago Sun-Times critic Catey Sullivan, calling the movie a "dumpster fire" and wondering "How on God’s green earth could anyone watch the 1987 film’s parade of stereotypes and misogyny and think, 'Hey! Let’s make it a musical!'?", said the musical was "a triumph over its source material." She predicted Broadway success. Chicago Tribune critic Chris Jones questioned whether the storyline, which he said had seemed dated in 1987, was edgy enough to attract a modern Broadway audience. He described the production as a "whip-bang, fast-paced, old-school, we-love-New York kind of show" and complimented its music and production values. Around the Town critic Alan Bresloff had also questioned whether the source material could be made interesting to modern audiences, but that the show had proved him wrong. New City Stage critic Noel Schechter had also questioned the wisdom of using the source material for a new musical but was convinced, crediting the success to the creation of multiple strong female lead characters, including Morton's Christy Lockhart and Heidi Kettenring's Vera Prescott. Jack Helbig of the Chicago Reader was unenthusiastic, calling the book "bland" and "cliched" and the music "forgettable", although he called out some of the performances, including those of Morton and Kettenring, for bringing "heart and fire" to the production.
