= Hotel Arthur =

- U.S. National Register of Historic Places
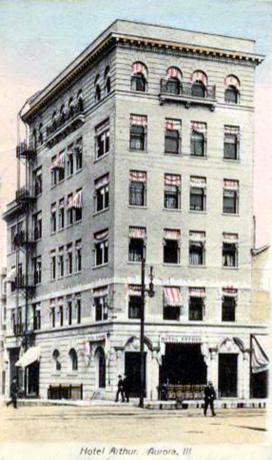
- Postcard of Hotel Arthur dated 1906

- Location within Illinois Location within the United States
- Location: 2-4 N. Broadway; Aurora, Kane County, Illinois, United States
- Coordinates: 41°45′26″N 88°18′47″W
- Built: 1905
- Architect: Eugene Malmer
- Architectural style: Renaissance Revival
- NRHP reference No.: 04001300
- Added to NRHP: March 15, 2005

Hotel Arthur, also commonly known as the Traction Terminal Building, is a historic, six-story building in Aurora, Illinois. It was originally designed as a hotel to service travelers on the Fox River. The Aurora, Elgin and Chicago Railroad relocated their headquarters here in 1915, and the building became the final station on the Aurora branch.

== History ==
The Renaissance Revival building was constructed in 1905 and initially functioned as a hotel. John Knell, Sr., a beer wholesaler who immigrated from Germany, commissioned the building in 1904. Upon completion, Hotel Arthur was the tallest building in Aurora, surpassed in 1917 by Hotel Aurora. It was the only hotel on the east side of the Fox River. The hotel was designed by Eugene Malmer and named after Arthur Knell, the brother of the owner.

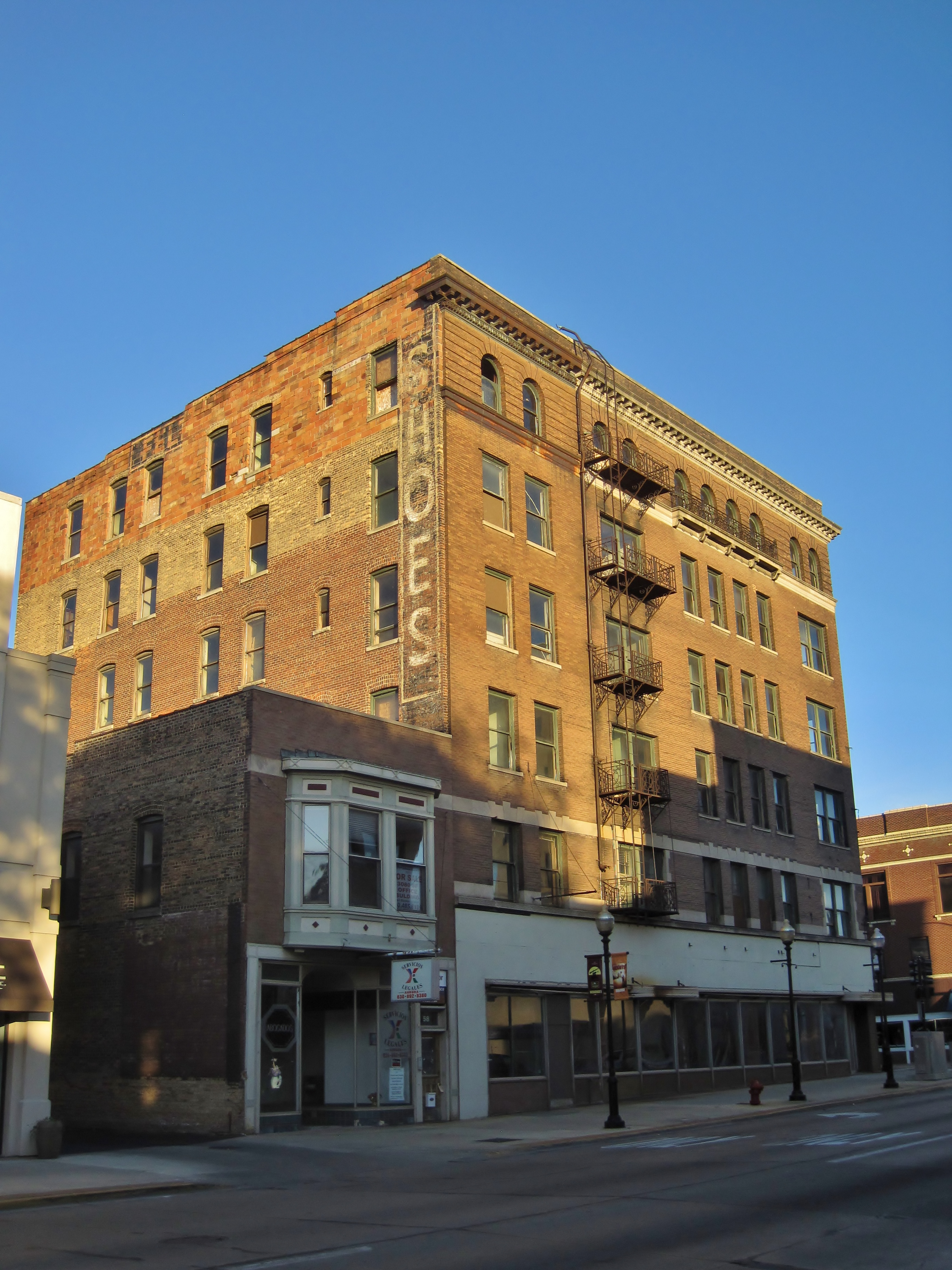
Hotel Arthur

In 1915, the Aurora, Elgin and Chicago Railroad leased the building serve as their headquarters. Renamed the Traction Terminal Building, the first floor was converted into a waiting station and diner. Other professional entities, such as health care practices and insurance offices, also moved into the building on upper levels. Later that year, the building passed to John Knell, Jr. Like his father, Knell was a successful businessman and was president of the All-Steel Equipment Company for forty years. The twenty-year lease to the railroad ended in 1935, but the Traction Terminal name stuck with the building. It continued to house small businesses on the ground floor and practices on upper floors. Storefront windows were installed in 1937.

The building prospered through the 1950s, until new highways diminished the demand for rail traffic. With decreased usage of the Aurora train system, the downtown area fell into disrepair. The upper floors were abandoned in the 1960s and the last business moved out of the ground floor in 2003. The building is currently being converted into a condominium complex. It was added to the National Register of Historic Places on March 15, 2005.

== Architecture ==
The exterior is pressed red brick with Indiana Limestone courses above and below the second floor and above the fifth floor. Windows on the other floors have limestone sills. The southern (Galena Blvd.) elevation has ten windows per floor while the eastern (Broadway Ave.) elevation has four windows per floor. The east side originally had eight windows, but the 1906 and 1912 additions to the west side of the structure provided an additional two. Most floors have wood-framed double hung windows, while the sixth floor has arched windows. A decorative cornice adorns the top of the building with a dentil course. The cornice is mostly limestone, except for the area above the additions which is metal. A metal fire escape runs along two of the windows on the Galena Blvd. facade. The first floor was originally rusticated limestone before it was replaced with glass storefronts in 1937. The northern facade is blocked by an adjacent building on the first three floors. The remaining floors are undetailed brick, but do have double-hung windows matching the southern facade. There is also a faded paint advertisement on this side. Similarly, the western facade is blocked on the first two floors with windows and a faded painted sign. The ground floor was remodeled in 1966 to become a restaurant. The upper floors, which have hardwood floors, are accessed through a door on Broadway.

| Preceding station | Chicago Aurora and Elgin Railroad | Following station |
|---|---|---|
| Terminus | Aurora Branch | Illinois Avenue toward Wheaton |
