= Stolp Island =

- Stolp Island Historic District
- U.S. National Register of Historic Places
- U.S. Historic district
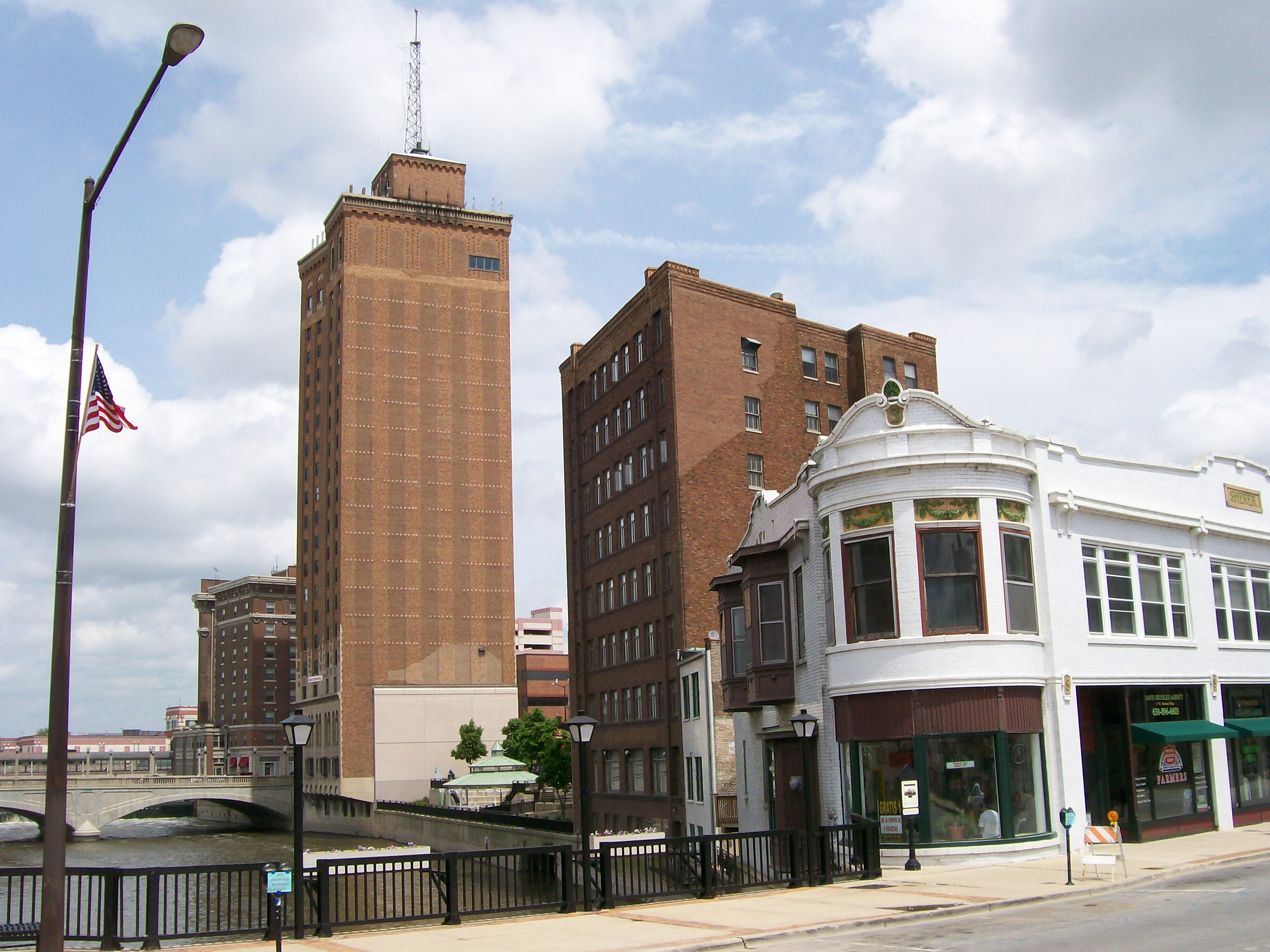
- View of Stolp Island buildings from Downer Place

- Location within Illinois Location within the United States
- Location: Aurora, Illinois
- Coordinates: 41°45′27″N 88°18′56″W
- Area: 0.03 square miles (0.1 km^{2})
- NRHP reference No.: 86001487
- Added to NRHP: September 10, 1986

Stolp Island is a small island in the Fox River in Aurora, Illinois. In 1986 the island and its 41 buildings were added to the National Register of Historic Places as the Stolp Island Historic District. It covers 0.03 square miles (0.1 km^{2}) of land area.

== History ==
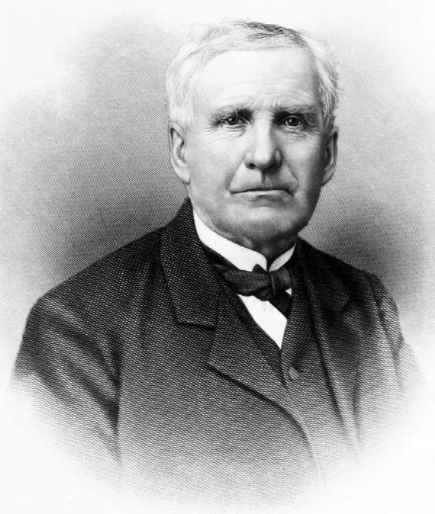
Joseph Stolp (1812–1899)

The island is named after Joseph Stolp who purchased the island for $12.72 in 1848. He constructed a mill on the island with Zaphna Lake and the McCarty brothers. The dam for the mill was completed in 1835. By 1848, the town had grown to over 1,000 people. As Aurora grew, the Fox River caused a separation between the two halves of the city, leading to animosity between them. Stolp Island, then, became an ideal location for Aurora's government structures, as it was not confined to either side.

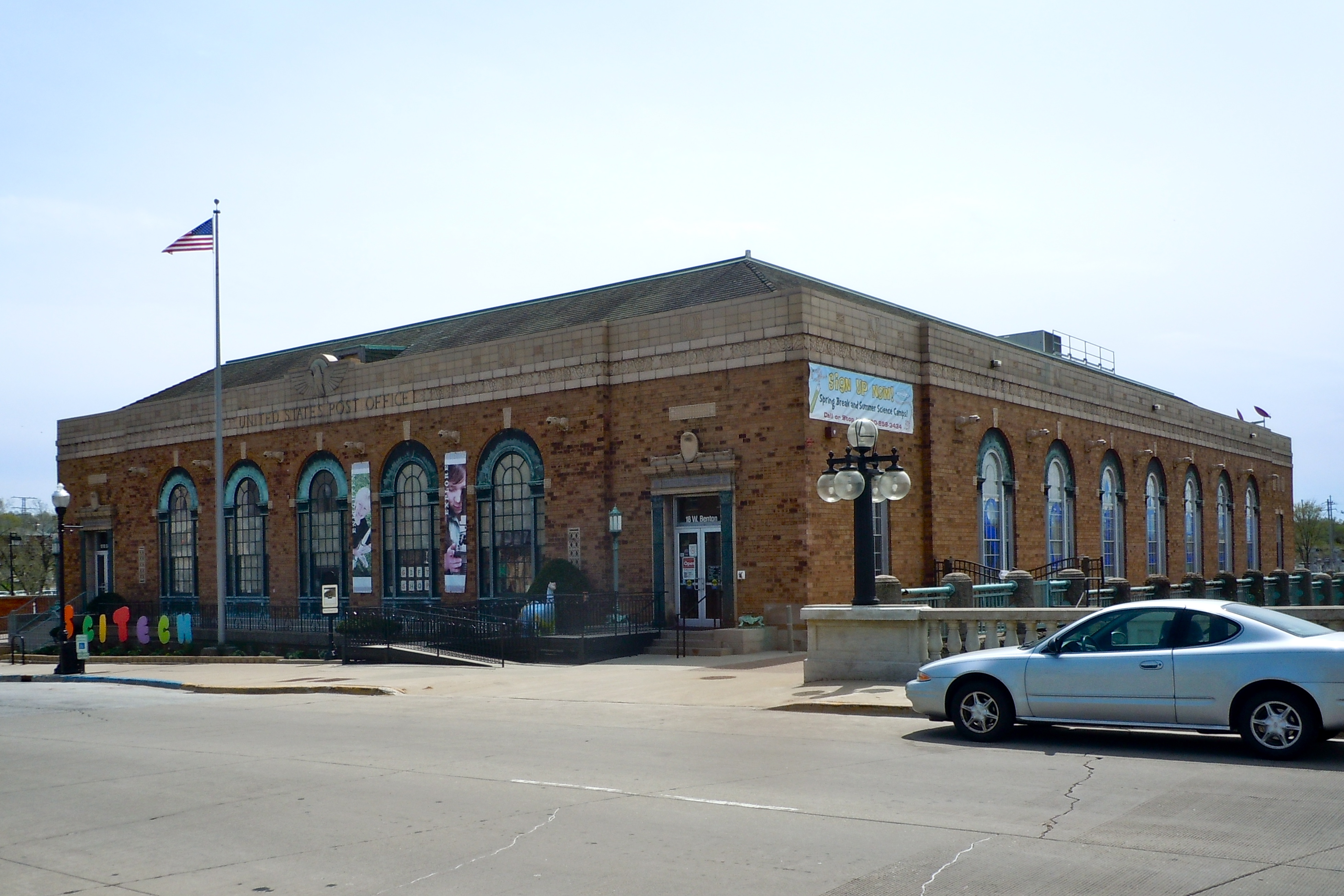
Old Post Office

East Aurora was incorporated as a city in 1845, and West Aurora followed in 1854. The Aurora area received its first major economical boost when the Chicago, Burlington, & Quincy Roundhouse and Locomotive Shop was constructed in 1856. Prior to this point, commercial development was strictly fit to meet local needs, but the new train station and shops provided new customers. In 1857, following efforts by William Parker, the two cities joined as one city. The city charter was approved on the condition that a new city hall would be built on Stolp Island. It was constructed in 1865 and featured a post office on the first floor.

Public organizations also saw Stolp as an ideal island to serve both sides of Aurora. The Grand Army of the Republic Hall was opened in 1877 to serve Grand Army of the Republic Post No. 20. The island also housed a Carnegie library and the first YMCA building. In the 1920s, the north end of the island, previously prone to flooding, was expanded and reinforced with landfill. While Aurora became a major steel exporter in the early 20th century, Stolp Island was used exclusively for commercial and public uses.

In 1907, the Columbia Conservatory of Music was built as a school for music, art, dancing, and foreign languages. It was presided over by Harry Rutt Detweiler and closed when he decided to retire.

Hotel Aurora was constructed in 1917 and surpassed Hotel Arthur as the tallest building in Aurora. The Renaissance Revival structure was built in hopes that the newly expanded north end would help Stolp Island become a major attraction. Two office buildings were designed in the Prairie Style by George Grant Elmslie: the Keystone Building (1923) and the Graham Building (1926). The Benevolent and Protective Order of Elks constructed the Aurora Elks Lodge No. 705 in 1926, in the Mayan Revival architecture style. A third major hotel, Leland Tower, was constructed across the street in 1928 and was operated by the same family as Hotel Arthur. When it opened, Hotel Leland was the tallest building in Illinois outside of Chicago. The Rapp and Rapp Paramount Theatre opened in 1931 and operated continuously until a 1976 restoration.

== Major Buildings on Stolp Island ==
- Benton St. Bridge (east branch)
- Downtown Auto Service Station
- SciTech Hands On Museum
- Downer Place Bridge (east branch)
- Linden & Lake Plumbers Building
- Aurora Herald/Freemasons Building
- Aurora Coin & Stamp Building
- G. A. R. Memorial Building
- Fox Theatre Building & Promenade
- Aurora Silver Plate Mfg. Building
- Aurora Greenhouse
- Stolp Woolen Mill Store, separately listed on the NRHP
- Stolp Woolen Mill Dye House
- VIP Realty
- Metropolitan Business College
- Sherer Building
- Galena Blvd Bridge (east channel)
- Aurora Civic Center Authority Offices
- Paramount Theatre
- Block & Kuhl/Carson Pirie Scott Building
- North Island Center
- New York Street Memorial Bridge
- Hotel Aurora
- Moose Building/Isle Theater
- Stanley's Furniture Building
- Keystone Building (Aurora, Illinois)
- Graham Building (Aurora, Illinois)
- 37 S. Stolp Ave.
- Assell's Photo Shop
- Barefoot Charley's Diner
- Leland Tower
- Illinois Bell
- Columbia Conservatory of Music
- Aurora Elks Lodge No. 705, separately listed on the NRHP
- Building at northwest corner of Stolp & Galena
