= Paramount Theatre (Aurora, Illinois) =

Theater in Aurora, Illinois, United States

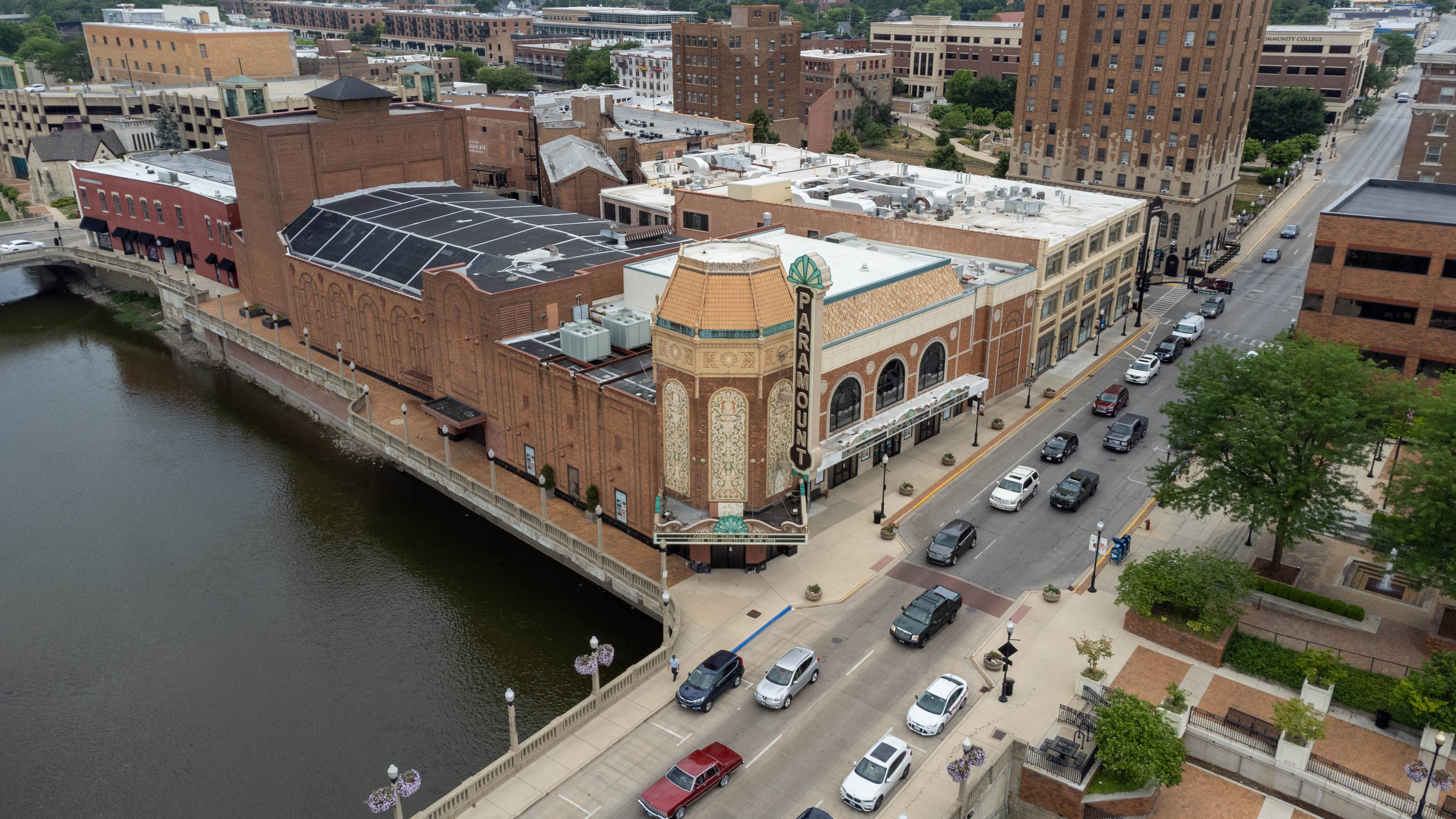
- Interactive map of Paramount Theatre
- Address: 23 E. Galena Blvd.
- Location: Aurora, Illinois
- Owner: Aurora Civic Center Authority
- Capacity: 1,885

Construction
- Built: 1931
- Renovated: 1978

Website
- paramountaurora.com
- Paramount Theatre
- U.S. National Register of Historic Places
- U.S. Historic district – Contributing property
- Location within Illinois Location within the United States
- Coordinates: 41°45′27.6″N 88°18′52″W
- Architect: Rapp and Rapp
- NRHP reference No.: 80001371
- Added to NRHP: September 10, 1986

The Paramount Theatre, also known as the Paramount Arts Center, opened in Aurora, Illinois, in 1931. It was designed by Rapp and Rapp in the Art Deco style with Venetian elements. Over the years, it has hosted films, plays, musicals, concerts, comedy shows, and other acts. The structure was restored in the 1970s and added to the National Register of Historic Places in 1980. It is part of the Stolp Island Historic District.

In the 1920s, Paramount Pictures began to construct theaters that could accompany their latest films. Talkies had just begun to appear in theaters, and Paramount executives predicted exponential growth in the industry. Older theaters had acoustics and audience accommodations ideal for live theater, but advances in film technology required new trends in these areas. However, since all new theaters showed the same performances, theater design could streamline by having similar visual design. Vaudeville was now only shown on weekends and was no longer a medium for nationally recognized talent.

The Paramount Theatre in Aurora was commissioned in 1931 by J. J. Rubens for one million dollars. It was designed by esteemed theater architects C. W. and George Leslie Rapp. It was the first air conditioned building built outside of Chicago. Paramount intended to bring such large theaters to all large cities across the country, but the Great Depression effectively ended these plans. The theater opened in September 1931 with appearances from Paramount film stars including The Marx Brothers, Jack Benny, Jeanette MacDonald and Burns and Allen. It is capable of holding 1,843 people; originally it held 2,125, but capacity had to be reduced to conform to fire codes.

In 1976, the theater closed for renovation following its sale to the Aurora Civic Center Authority. It re-opened on April 19, 1978. On September 10, 1986, it was recognized as a Historic Place by the United States National Park Service, and was simultaneously recognized as contributing property of the Stolp Island Historic District. A lobby was added in 2006, and it remains an important part of the downtown Aurora economy.

== Notable productions ==
In March 2020 The Secret of My Success, based on the 1987 movie of the same name, was mid-run for its world premiere and pre-Broadway tryout with Sydney Morton (Christy Lockhart) and Billy Harrigan Tighe (Brantley Foster/Carlton Whitfield) as leads and Gordon Greenberg directing when production was shut down due to the coronavirus pandemic. It had been scheduled to run from February 21 – March 29, and the final performance was March 12, as Illinois governor J. B. Pritzker shut down all performance venues starting March 13.
