= Keystone Building (Aurora, Illinois) =

- U.S. National Register of Historic Places
- U.S. Historic district – Contributing property
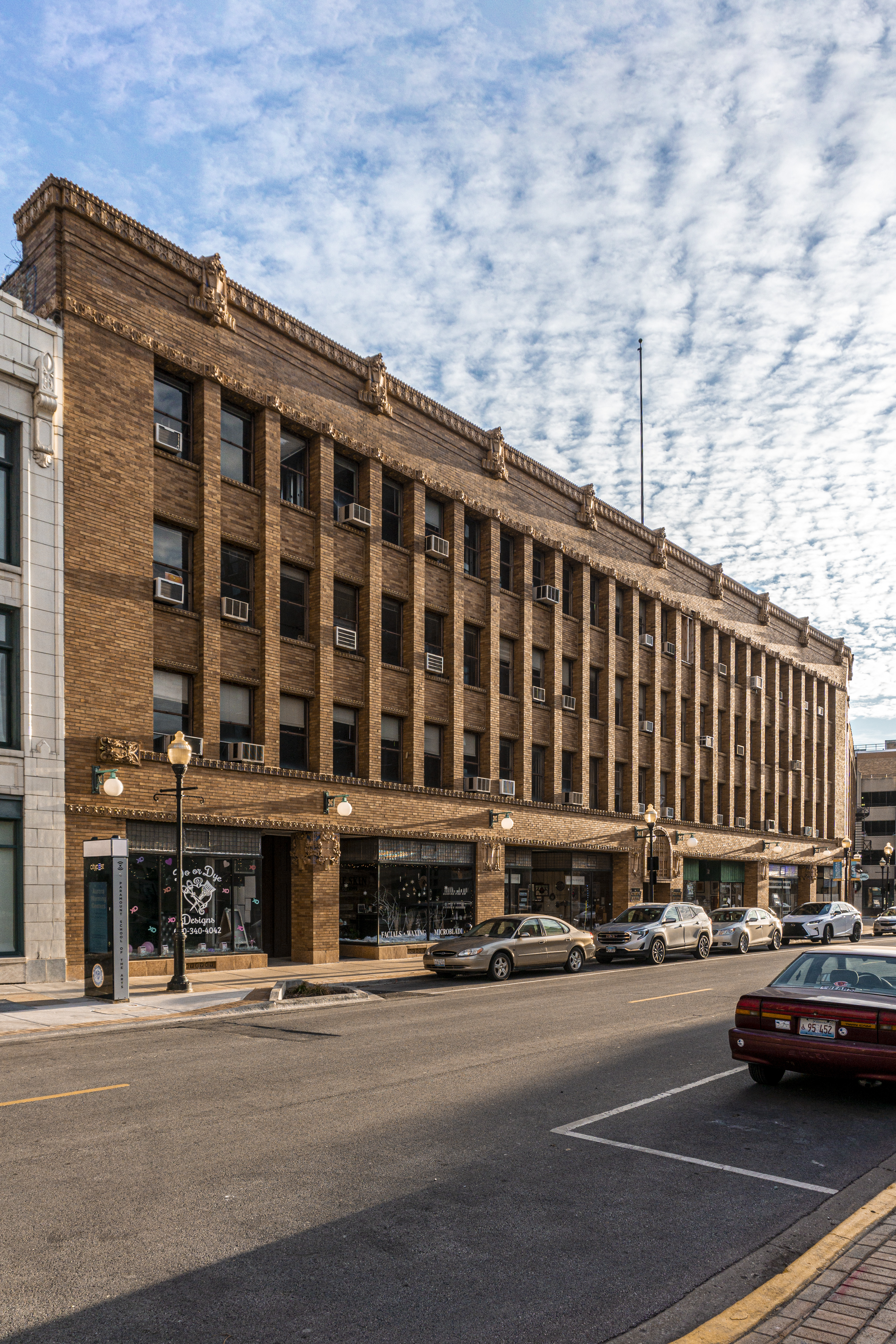

- Location within Illinois Location within the United States
- Location: 30 S. Stolp Ave., Aurora, Illinois
- Coordinates: 41°45′26″N 88°18′57″W
- Area: less than one acre
- Built: 1922
- Architects: Elmslie, George Grant; Fournier, L.A.
- Architectural style: Prairie School
- NRHP reference No.: 80001370
- Added to NRHP: March 18, 1980

The Keystone Building in Aurora, Illinois is a building from 1922. It was listed on the National Register of Historic Places in 1980. The structure is one of two buildings on Stolp Island designed by George Grant Elmslie, the other one being the Graham Building. In addition, there are three other buildings within Aurora that share the same architect, (the Old Second National Bank, the Healy Chapel, and the German-American Bank) making Aurora, Illinois the biggest collection of Elmslie's commercial buildings.

== History ==
The Keystone Building is the largest private office building designed by George Grant Elmslie. It also may be the largest office building designed in the Prairie Style. It was planned as the Joseph George & Newhall Building in 1922. The Aurora Silverplate Company had previously occupied the building, but moved out onto another lot. Their old building was partially demolished and Elmslie was tasked with incorporating part of it into a new building. It was Elmslie's first commission since he split from his business partner William G. Purcell. L. A. Fournier, who had worked with Purcell & Elmslie, was listed as an associate architect. The building was recognized by the National Park Service on its National Register of Historic Places on March 18, 1980. Furthermore, it is a contributing property to the Stolp Island Historic District, listed on September 10, 1986.

== Architecture ==
The Keystone Building is found on Stolp Island in Aurora, Illinois. The four-story building features a ground floor dedicated to individual shops, each with a private entryway. The main (west) facade stretched 165 feet (50 m) on Stolp Avenue. It is irregularly shaped on its rear facade, as it is on a triangular lot. The north facade is 115 feet (35 m) long and the south is only 25 feet (7.6 m) long. The entry to the main building is found under a patterned terra cotta screen. There are five major bays on the first floor: three north of the entry and two south. The bays are separated by brick piers, as is the entryway. The upper three floors have identical exteriors with double hung windows between brick piers. An ornamental terra cotta cornice caps the building on the main facade. The building is built with brown glazed brick with flecks of iron, which provides some blue and green bits. A terra cotta belt course is found above the first floor. Each of the six piers on the main facade features a decorative terra cotta shield. There are additional shields decorating the cornice. Eight bronze and glass light fixtures above the first floor provide external illumination.

Inside the main entrance leads to a lobby with an elevator and staircase. The three upper floors are divided into office suites off of a main corridor. Each floor features a central lobby with access to elevator and stair. A skylight is found above the fourth floor lobby. The floors are polished terrazzo. The remains of the previous building are found in the northeastern quadrant.
