= Charles H. Pizzano =

American sculptor (1893–1987)

Charles H. Pizzano (January 23, 1893 – February 24, 1987), born Ciriaco Pizzano, was a sculptor from Medford, Massachusetts, with work featured around the United States.

== Biography ==
Pizzano was born in Torre Le Nocelle, Italy. His family immigrated to the United States in 1905. His interest in art began while attending the North Bennett Industrial School in Boston's North End. After his teachers convinced his parents to support his artistic education, Charles attended the Roman Art School under Professor G. DeBenedictis and famous sculptor Angelo Lualdi.

Although his work can primarily be found across New England, over his long career he would be commissioned for pieces destined for such notable places as the National Cathedral in Washington, D.C., the American Red Cross Museum in Washington, D.C., the Vatican, Harvard University, and churches, cathedrals, colleges and universities across the United States.

Pizzano married Emma Ciampia (sister to sculptor Emilius Ciampia) and lived in Medford, Massachusetts, for over 45 years, summering for 20 years in Falmouth, Massachusetts. Upon leaving his studio in Boston, he later built a studio behind his home and continued working until his late 80s. He died at age 94 in 1987.

== Notable works ==
- Memorial Hall (Foxborough, Massachusetts), Statue of Union Soldier
- Christopher Columbus Memorial, Westerly, Rhode Island
- Baker Library, Harvard University
- Baker with pie symbol for Howard Johnson's chain
- Washington Cathedral
- St. John Cathedral, New York City
- St. Anthony Church, Revere, Massachusetts
