= Impact of the COVID-19 pandemic on the performing arts =

Aspect of viral outbreak

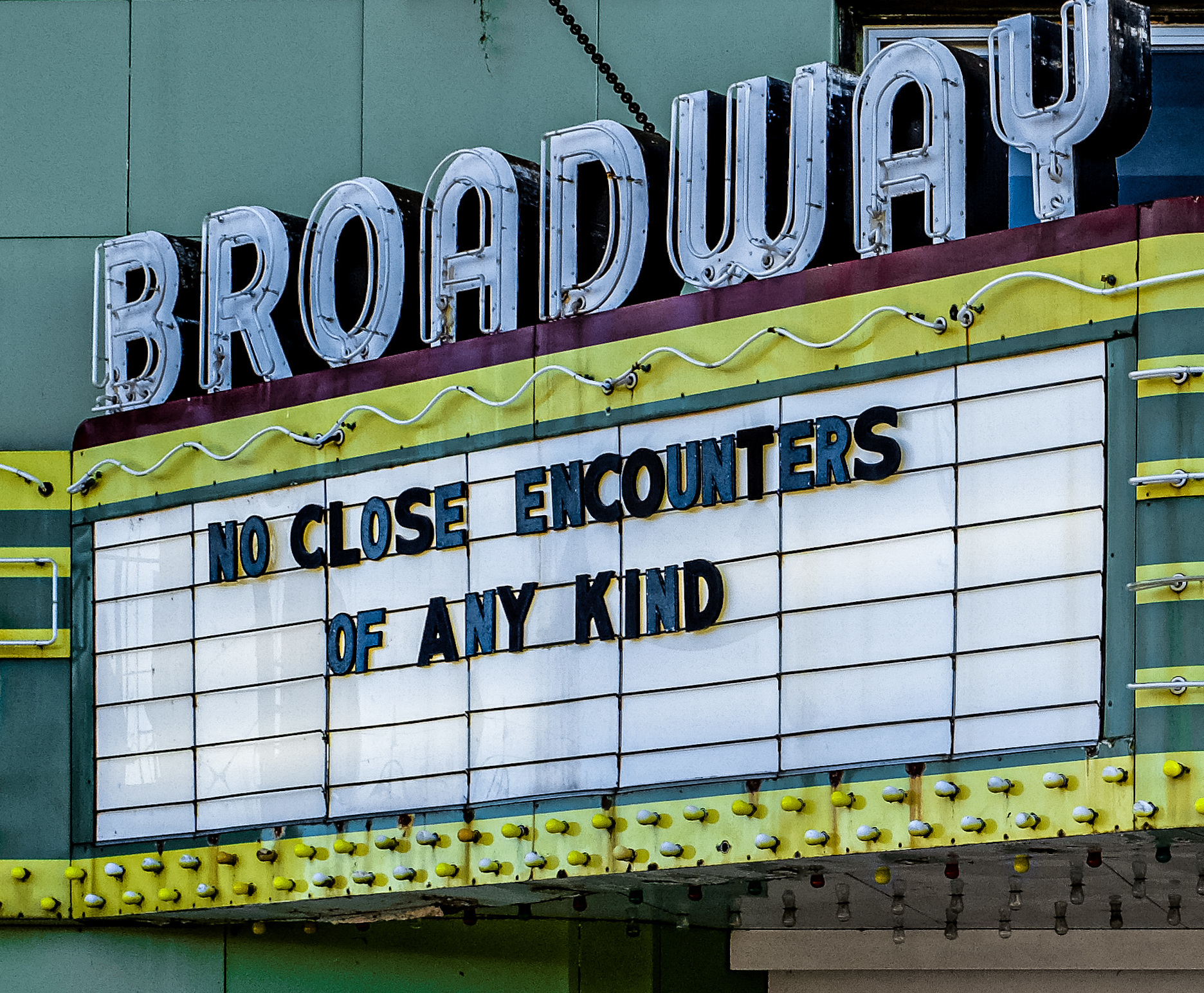
A theater marquee in Mount Pleasant, Michigan promotes social distancing

The COVID-19 pandemic had a significant impact on the performing arts, mirroring its impacts across all arts sectors. Due to physical distancing requirements and closure of the physical venues, curtailing not only public performances but also rehearsals, many performing arts institutions attempted to adapt by offering new (or newly expanded) digital services. In particular this resulted in the free online streaming of previously recorded performances of many companies – especially orchestral performances and plays – lists of which were collated by journalists as well as bespoke crowdsourcing projects.

== Cancellations and closures ==
=== Live music and theatre ===
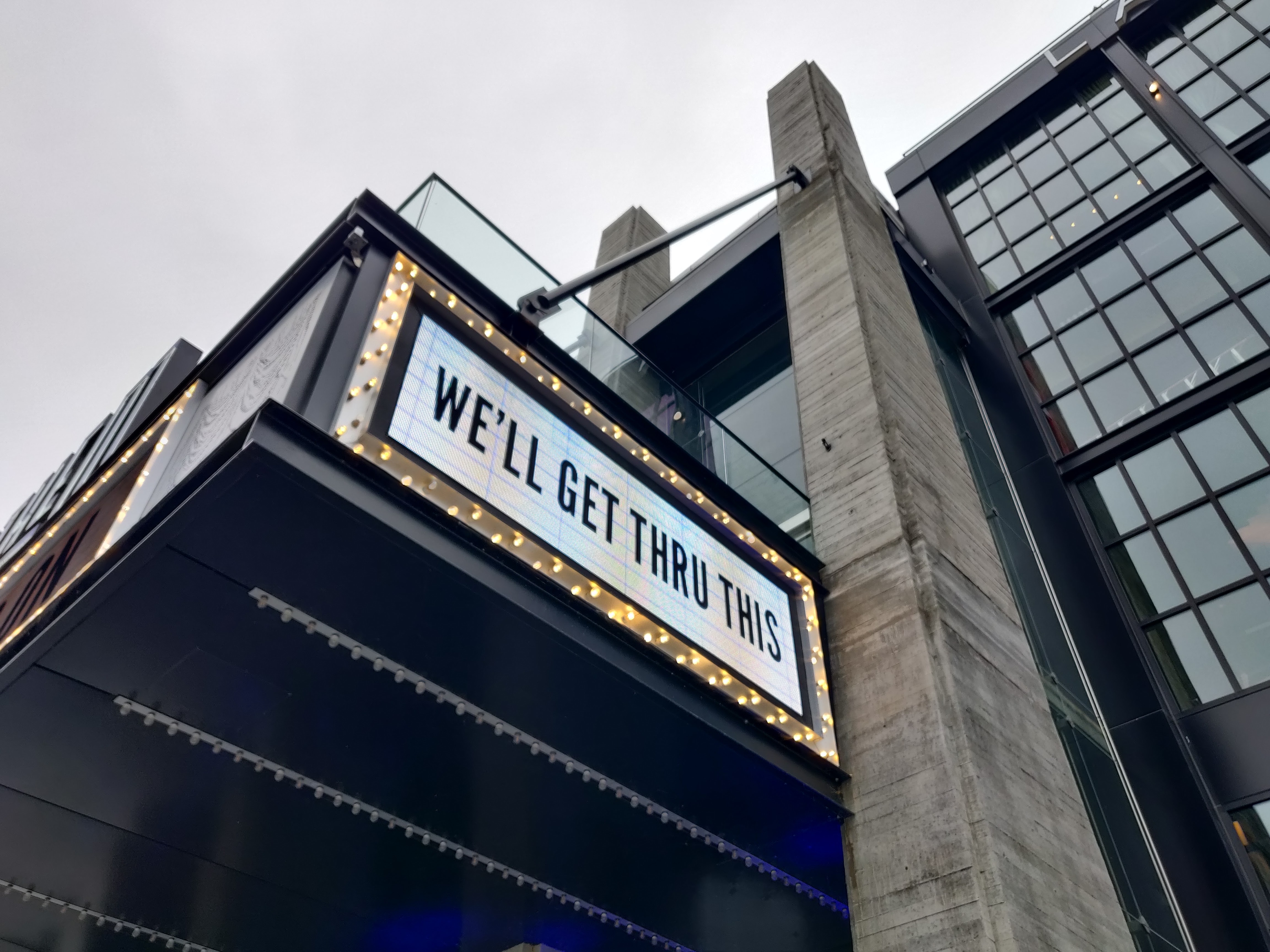
Marquee at The Anthem, a music venue in Washington, D.C., that ceased operations during the pandemic

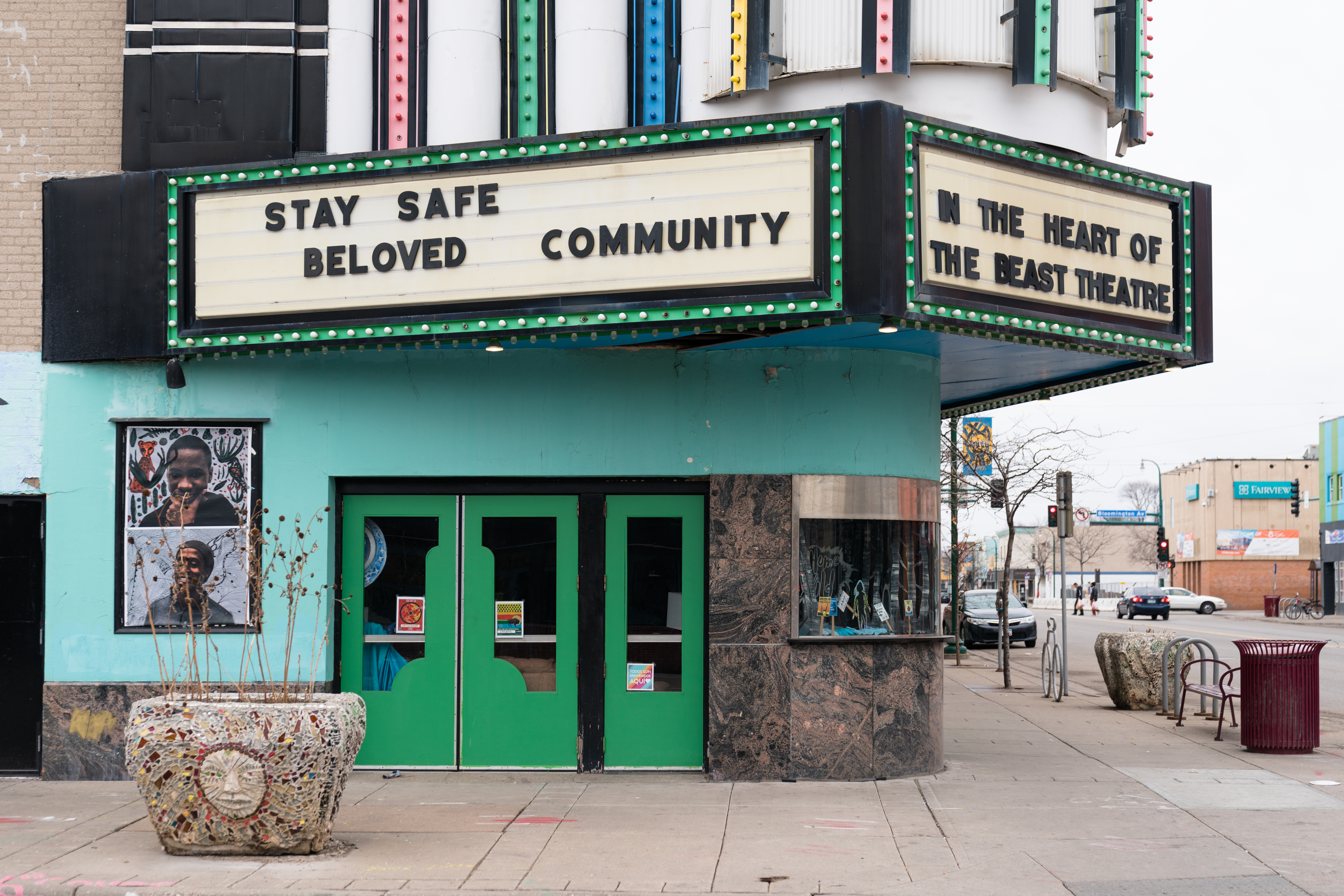
Marquee of In the Heart of the Beast Theatre in Minneapolis

Live musical performances in indoor spaces were cancelled. Theatre performances were cancelled or delayed. All Broadway theatres in New York were closed as well as West End theatres in London. Waitress on West End and Frozen on Broadway announced they would close permanently. 9 to 5: The Musical on West End, Beetlejuice, The Inheritance, and Thriller – Live on Broadway and the Endgame and Rough for Theatre II double bill at The Old Vic were already scheduled to end, but were forced to close earlier than expected. Both Hangmen and revival of Who's Afraid of Virginia Woolf? on Broadway cancelled their entire run, though they had a few preview performances prior to the Broadway shut down. Mean Girls announced on January 7, 2021, that it would not be reopening post pandemic, though it intended to resume its tour and the film adaptation of the musical remained in the works. The Secret of My Success, mid-run in its world premiere and pre-Broadway tryout at the Paramount Theatre, was shut down March 13. Shakespeare's Globe called for urgent funding in order to avoid insolvency.

Premieres and openings postponed included the world premieres of 101 Dalmatians and Identical, Broadway openings as revival of American Buffalo, Caroline, or Change, Diana, Flying Over Sunset, revival of How I Learned to Drive, The Lehman Trilogy, Mrs. Doubtfire, revival of Plaza Suite, Sing Street, Six, and revival of Take Me Out; West End openings including Blithe Spirit, Cinderella, revival of The Seagull and revival of Sunday in the Park with George; Local Hero and 4000 Miles at the Old Vic. Hairspray at the London Coliseum, and What's New Pussycat? at the Leeds Playhouse.

The 2020 Laurence Olivier Awards ceremony was cancelled, with the awards issued in an alternate manner. The 74th Tony Awards was postponed. The 2020 announcement of the Pulitzer Prize for Drama was postponed to May 4 via live stream on the prize's official website.

Throughout 2021, spikes in the pandemic caused some closures even after markets reopened.

=== Dance ===
Most dance companies have cancelled their remainders of the 2019–2020 season, and several companies have cancelled the entire spring season. For example, the American Ballet Theatre 80th Anniversary Season at the Metropolitan Opera House was cancelled, along with New York Premiere of Of Love and Rage and several dancers' debuts.

At the start of the pandemic in March 2020, all Broadway shows were stopped. This included ceasing the show Riverdance, which was doing a run in Radio City Music Hall for their 25th anniversary tour throughout North America.

In June 2020, the New York City Ballet announced the remaining performance in 2020 are canceled, including the annual George Balanchine's The Nutcracker performances in December, the first time since the ballet premiered in 1954. Some companies had to reschedule their future performances and premieres. For example, National Ballet of Canada had to revise their 2020/21 season, with the world premieres of MADDADDAM postponed to fall 2020, Karen Kain's Swan Lake postponed to 2021, and the North American premiere of Victoria postponed to 2022 to make way for Swan Lake.

The performance cancellations had also impacted several dancers' retirement, such as Eleonora Abbagnato of the Paris Opera Ballet, whose departure was already delayed due to a dancers' strike, and is now postponed to autumn 2020. The respective farewells of American Ballet Theatre's Stella Abrera and Alvin Ailey American Dance Theater's Hope Boykin were not rescheduled.

=== Orchestra ===
Most orchestra performances have been cancelled or postponed. For example, the Boston Symphony Orchestra cancelled their Asian tour, Orchestre de Paris had also cancelled their concerts.

=== Opera ===
Most opera productions have been cancelled or postponed, by companies such as the Canadian Opera Company, Metropolitan Opera and The Royal Opera. The world premiere of Ritratto, which was commissioned by the Dutch National Opera, was also postponed.

In response to the cancellation of many of its planned productions, Finnish National Opera commissioned, created, and produced Covid fan tutte, a comic opera about life during the pandemic using music from Mozart's Cosi fan tutte, starring a Finnish cast and premiering 28 August 2020 with small audiences and social distancing restrictions.

=== Festivals ===
Many performing arts festivals are cancelled, including the 2020 Edinburgh Fringe Festival, cancelled for the first time in 60 years. The 2020 edition of Hong Kong Arts Festival and Oerol Festival are also cancelled, though the Holland Festival is attempting to convert to online event.

=== Comedy ===
Live stand-up comedy ended early in the pandemic, comedians managed to adjust their performance around COVID-19. Many used Instagram Live to reach audiences; front-facing camera comedy became the dominant form during the pandemic, replacing the comedy special.

== Adaptations ==
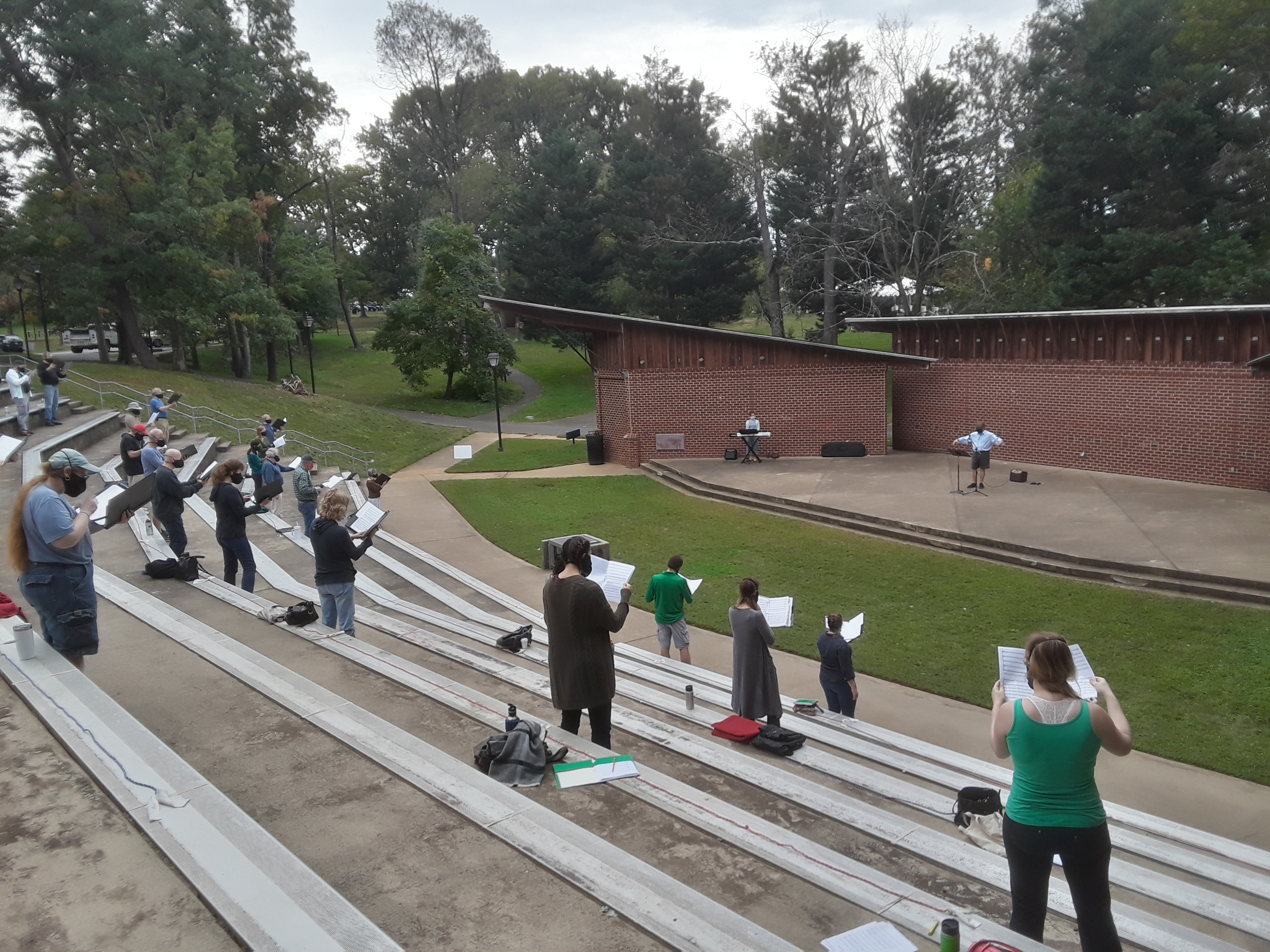
Members of the Capitol Hill Chorale participate in a socially-distanced outdoor rehearsal, wearing singers' masks, in Alexandria, Virginia on October 10, 2020

=== Socially distanced performances ===
Individual actors, such as Patrick Stewart and Sam Neill, entertained from isolation in order to "...be in this together and that this has to take the form of being apart", as Neill described his contribution of comedic relief. Stewart, a trained Shakespearian actor, broadcast himself reading one sonnet each day via Instagram, readings described as "more than light entertainment, they're moments of connection". The Sydney Theatre Company commissioned actors to film themselves at home discussing, then performing, a monologue from one of the characters they had previously played on stage.

The original West End cast of Mamma Mia!, reunited via a group video call, sang "Thank You for the Music" in tribute to NHS and a cast member with coronavirus. Lin-Manuel Miranda and the cast of the musical Hamilton (including original performers Leslie Odom Jr., Anthony Ramos and Renée Elise Goldsberry) reunited on John Krasinski's Some Good News to surprise a nine-year-old girl named Aubrey who was a "superfan" of Hamilton but was unable to see the show due to the coronavirus. They also sang "Alexander Hamilton" for Aubrey.

Kathy Lette presented a Zoom performance of The One Day of the Year with five actors performing from their homes.

The Old Vic have announced a socially distanced performance of Lungs by Duncan Macmillan starring Claire Foy and Matt Smith to be performed live from the Old Vic stage and relayed on-line to a ticketed audience of the same size as Old Vic's usual capacity.

The Royal Opera House had its first performance on 13 June, which was broadcast via YouTube and BBC Radio 3. The performance included classical music and a new dance by Wayne McGregor.

Many ballet companies ran classes via Zoom to their dancers which were also broadcast. Ballet dancers, including principal dancer with the American Ballet Theatre, James B. Whiteside and Isabella Boylston, as well as the artistic director and a lead principal dancer of the English National Ballet Tamara Rojo, offered live classes on social media.

Musicians had performed at-home concerts during quarantine.

The Maltings Theatre, St Albans performed an interactive production of Twelfth Night with both cast and audience being Zoom participants.

The Original Theatre Company announced a performance of Birdsong using live performance and video tech as a fundraiser for The Royal British Legion directed by Alastair Whatley.

The Lockdown Theatre Festival is a BBC radio festival comprising a debate about the future of theatre and four radio plays that had either had curtailed runs or failed to start due to COVID-19: Lyric Hammersmith Theatre's Love Love Love by Mike Bartlett, Manchester Royal Exchange's Rockets And Blue Lights by Winsome Pinnock (this had no performances, and was to have been a world premiere), Orange Tree Theatre's The Mikvah Project by Josh Azouz, and Royal Court Theatre's Shoe Lady by E.V. Crowe.

Considering how to host to audiences at internal venues, the Kings Theatre, Southsea has that announced its 2020 pantomime will be performed for a reduced audience of 400 (compared to its usual 1400) capacity, who will have their seats allocated by the venue, be directed to specific entrances and arrival time, and will have to pre-book refreshments.

In June, Gran Teatre del Liceu reopened, though the performances were live-streamed and the audience was filled with plants.

In June, the musical Six announced that their West End and UK touring casts will perform drive-in performances in 12 open spaces across the UK, making them the first West End musical to resume performances. However, in July, the tour was cancelled due to local lockdowns in the UK.

In August, the musical Diana announced that the Broadway production will be recorded with no audience to be released on Netflix on October 1, 2021, ahead of its newly scheduled opening on December 1, 2021.

The 2020 Royal Variety Performance was held in Blackpool at the Opera House within the Winter Gardens, on the evening of 29 November. As a consequence of the pandemic, the show that has been attended by royalty since 1912 was performed to an empty auditorium. The audience was invited to make a donation to the Royal Variety Charity instead of buying tickets. Screens placed on the auditorium seats allowed performers to see the faces of their virtual audience. The recorded show was broadcast in iTV on 8 December.

In late 2020, users of the social media app TikTok crowdsourced the creation of a musical based on the 2007 Disney/Pixar film Ratatouille. Beginning when one TikTok user created a short comedic song in tribute to Remy, the main character of the film, users then remixed and added to each other's videos to envision a full musical, including scenic design, choreography, and more songs. A virtual concert presentation of it, produced by Seaview Productions, streamed for 72 hours on TodayTix beginning January 1, 2021 to benefit The Actors Fund. It was directed by Six co-creator and co-director Lucy Moss from a script adaptation by Michael Breslin and Patrick Foley, both of whom co-executive produced the concert with Jeremy O. Harris. The cast included Kevin Chamberlin as Gusteau, Andrew Barth Feldman as Linguini, Titus Burgess as Remy, Adam Lambert as Emile, Wayne Brady as Django, Priscilla Lopez as Mabel, Ashley Park as Colette, André De Shields as Anton Ego, Owen Tabaka as Young Anton Ego and Mary Testa as Skinner. The concert raised $1 million for The Actors Fund.

In February 2021, the planned narrative film adaptation of the musical Come from Away was cancelled in favor of recording the Broadway production with its cast reprising their roles. It was filmed that May with invited frontline workers and survivors of the September 11 attacks in the audience and was released on September 10, 2021, a day before the 20th anniversary of the 9/11 attacks.

=== Personal protective equipment ===
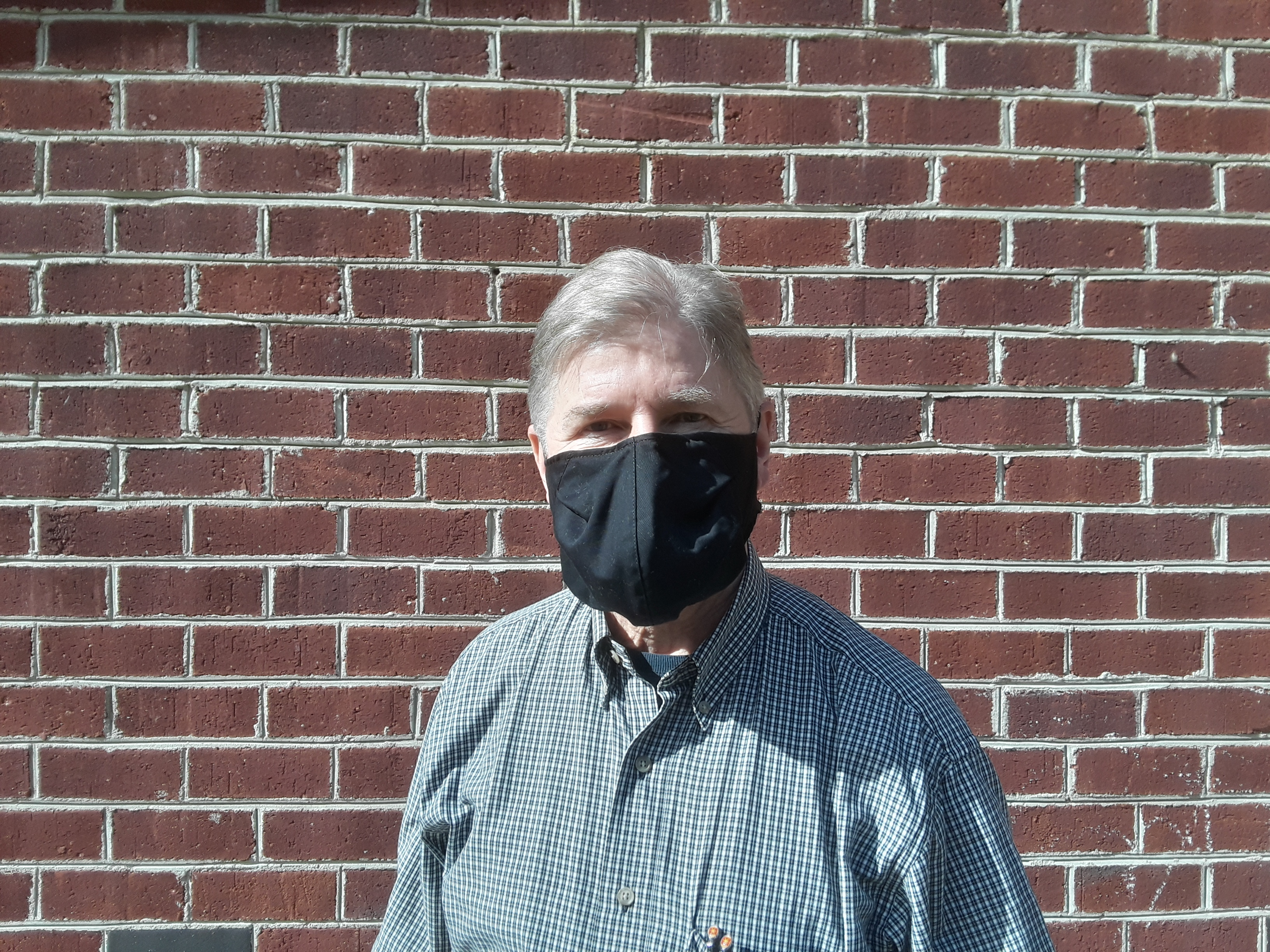
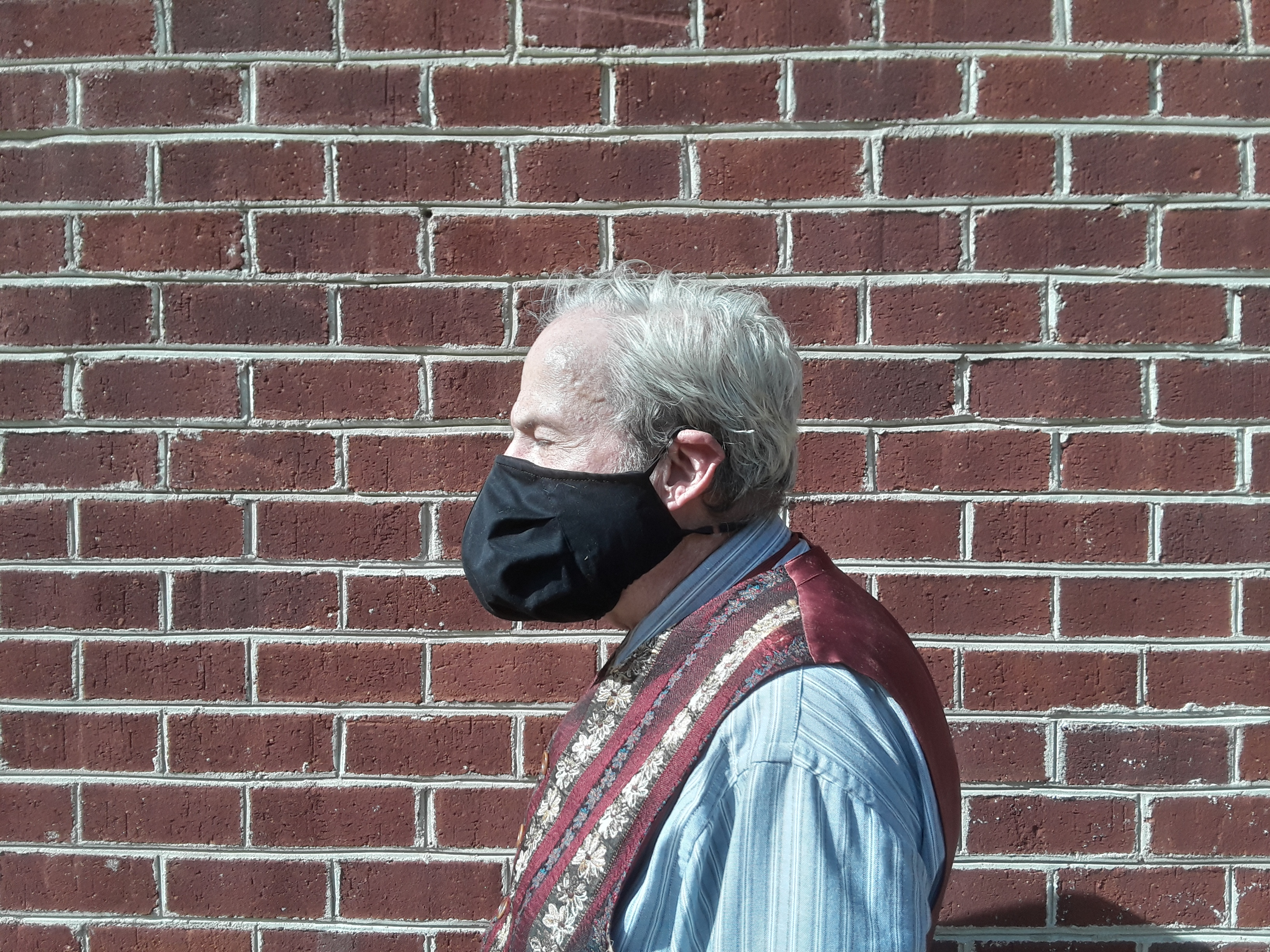
Front and side views of a singers' mask, which extends further away from the face than a traditional cloth mask

To allow performers to begin performing publicly again during the pandemic, a variety of organizations have begun to develop and market specialized personal protective equipment. A variety of specialized masks for singers have been created; traditional cloth masks can be sucked into the mouth while performing and muffle performers' voices, so singers' masks contain an interior superstructure that provides a resonant space while keeping cloth further away from the face. Proceeds from the sale of some masks are designated for charity. Other masks for woodwind and brass players, including components to cover the bells of instruments as needed, have also been produced, and are being sold through standard equipment retailers. Sound and virus shields, including portable examples meant to be attached to a music stand in various configurations, also exist.

Some musicians have designed themed face masks to raise money for charity. Conductor Iván Fischer designed a mask with plastic cups attached at the ears to enhance the acoustics of a live performance as experienced by the wearer.

Numerous music schools have devised protocols regarding the use of personal protective equipment as part of their return to on-campus studies and live performance.

=== Alternative activities ===
Due to the closure of productions and the simultaneous shortage of personal protective equipment (PPE) several theatre costume departments – including that of the Berlin State Opera – converted to creating face masks. The English National Opera produced face masks and scrubs for distribution to workers at the National Health Service.

=== Previously recorded performances ===
The filmed version of the stage musical Hamilton, originally scheduled for an October 15, 2021 theatrical release, but was later moved up to July 3, 2020, exclusively on Disney+, as announced by the show's creator Lin-Manuel Miranda on May 12, 2020. This push-up can also be seen as allowing the film to be watched in observance of a more relevant holiday from Halloween to Independence Day, as Act I of the musical is set during the American Revolutionary War—which Independence Day commemorates—and the play has Founding Fathers as characters.

Some professional performing arts companies have released previously recorded productions. For example, Andrew Lloyd Webber released recordings of his musicals on YouTube; the Royal Opera House released performances of the Royal Ballet and the Royal Opera; and Cirque du Soleil released one hour specials on YouTube each week. Actress Phoebe Waller-Bridge made the video of her play Fleabag available online for donations of at least £4.

== Impacts ==
=== Budgets and employment ===
Due to the closures, reductions in revenues for cultural organisations reliant on ticket sales were expected to cause devastating effects on organisational staffing, and on independent artists and professionals, partly due to the fact that the arts and culture is an economic sector characterised by a particularly high proportion of self-employment. For example, by March 20, Cirque du Soleil had laid off 95% of its workforce and closed traveling circus performances operating in seven countries. Performing arts festivals such as the Hong Kong Arts Festival were cancelled.

Opera Australia – Australia's largest performing arts company – temporarily stood down nearly all its staff amid speculation it would also need to sell major assets in order to avoid bankruptcy. By March 23, 255,000 cultural events had been cancelled, with an estimated revenue loss of $A280 million, self-reported through the crowdsourced website ILostMyGig.net.au.

In the United States, as the pandemic spread and closures became the standard rather than the exception, institutions started publishing expected revenue shortfall calculations. For example, by the end of March, the Metropolitan Opera expected to lose US$60 million in revenue.

In parallel to museum sector layoffs, staff began to unionise, even though social distancing orders prevented the in-person meetings required to sign the cards required to file for union elections. Meanwhile, on 18 March and in response to the rapid rise of online performances during the closures of performance spaces, the Actors' Equity Association announced a new "streaming media agreement" available to productions in areas with physical distancing regulations in force, for "select producers to capture and make a performance available online for one-time viewing to ticket buyers". A planned performance of 'Tis Pity She's a Whore via videoconferencing software was cancelled at the last minute due to a dispute between the theatre producers and the union. The AEA argued that during a time when almost everyone in the arts is going without a regular pay cheque and is worried about their health care, "it's deeply sad to see that some employers will still ask Equity actors to work without the protections of a contract." The theatre producers argued that "cyberspace" is not within the AEA's jurisdiction nor "...should free online-only experience, in which actors participate from the safety and comfort of their own home on teleconference, without rehearsal or admission price," be subject to the Off-Broadway agreement.

On 11 January 2021, it was announced that Indonesian–Japanese idol group JKT48 will forcibly mass-remove 26 of its 59 remaining members due to crisis caused by the COVID-19 pandemic and government-imposed large-scale social restrictions. They will officially leave the group mid-March 2021.

=== Financial aid ===
With the extensive financial disruption across all areas of the economy, many governments announced fiscal stimulus and economic bailout packages which included specific resources for the arts and cultural sectors. Equally, various charities and industry bodies raised funds to support their sector.

Arts and culture sector financial stimulus packages from individual countries included:

Australia: In March, a petition of over 50 arts and culture organisations (including peak bodies from the music, dance, visual arts, museums, writers' and indigenous arts groups) requested a financial aid package "...to a value of 2% of the $111.7 billion [cultural and creative] industry". Furthermore, it requesting the Prime Minister "...issue a public statement recognising the value of our industry to all Australians" and noting that the industry had not yet recovered from the impact of the 2019–20 Australian bushfire season. Separately, Live Performance Australia, which represents the live performing industry, had requested $850 million for its sector.

Instead of the $2.2billion requested in the petition, In early April the federal government announced a package of $27million in specific Arts funding – $7 million for the Indigenous Visual Arts Industry Support program, $10 million for Regional Arts Australia's regional arts fund, and $10 million for Support Act,"the charity that provides financial support and counselling to people in the music industry". It also expanded unemployment assistance in response to the pandemic – dubbed JobKeeper – however it specifically excluded "freelancers and casuals on short-term contracts, or who have worked for a series of employers in the last year". Given arts sector's high reliance on short-term contracts, a large proportion of arts and cultural sector professionals were ineligible for the scheme.

United Kingdom: Arts Council England announced £160 million would be made available for arts organisations, including £50 million for organisations it does not usually fund and £20 million for individual and freelance artists.

United States: In late March the United States federal government announced a $2 trillion economic stimulus package in the Coronavirus Aid, Relief, and Economic Security Act. It included: "$75 million for the National Endowment for the Arts and $75 million for the National Endowment for the Humanities, which can pass on the money to institutions that need it. Another $50 million was designated to the Institute of Museum and Library Services, which distributes funds to museums and libraries. Some Republicans criticized US$25 million in relief funding that was allocated for the Kennedy Center as wasteful spending.

=== Post-Covid ===
The arts have struggled for several years since the shutdown; West End and then Broadway audiences and grosses mostly recovered, but regional and local theatres, together with much of the arts industry, has continued to face challenges as costs rose and attendance remained low.
