= Grand Army of the Republic Hall (Aurora, Illinois) =

- GAR Memorial Building
- U.S. National Register of Historic Places
- U.S. Historic district – Contributing property
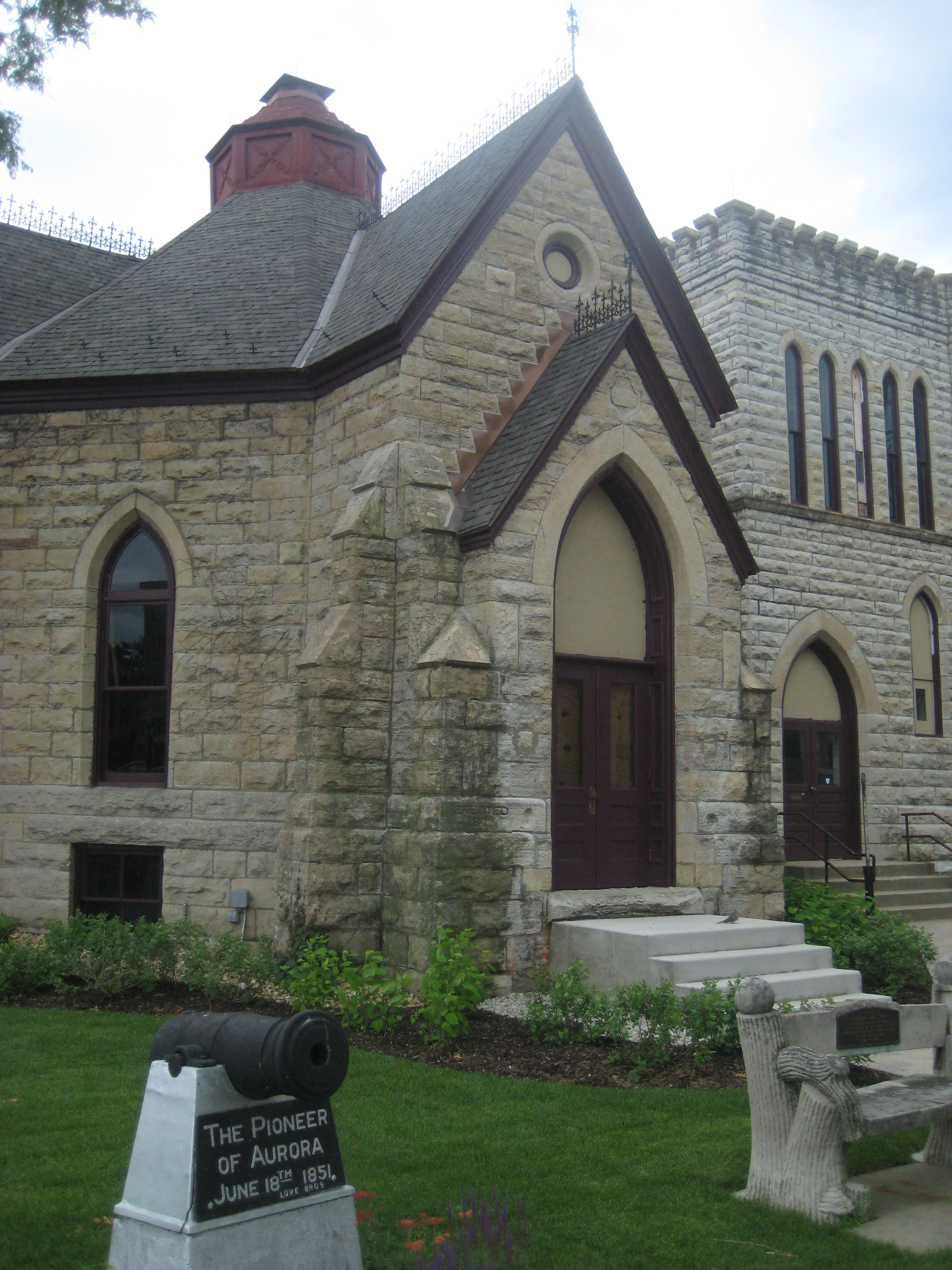
- Location: 23 East Downer Place; Aurora, Illinois
- Coordinates: 41.75667°N 88.31577°W
- Built: 1877
- Architect: Joseph Mulvey
- Architectural style: Gothic Revival
- NRHP reference No.: 84001130
- Added to NRHP: August 23, 1984

The Grand Army of the Republic Hall is an historic building located at 23 East Downer Place on Stolp Island in Aurora, Illinois, in the United States.

== History ==
The Soldier's Monument Association formed in Aurora in 1869 with the intent of raising funds to construct a monument to veterans of the U.S. Civil War. The group was very successful, and secretary Fred O. White proposed that a building should be erected in honor of the soldiers instead. White was inspired by a recent visit to Memorial Hall in Foxborough, Massachusetts, and noted that that structure was a useful meeting place and library. The Aurora building was intended to be almost identical to the Foxborough building, though the builders decided not to replicate the granite roof and stained glass. Joseph Mulvey was hired to design the building; no other Mulvey-designed structures have yet been identified.

The building was constructed on Stolp Island, a small piece of land considered to be "neutral territory" between the east and west sides of Aurora. Stolp Island was a popular spot for public buildings due to increasingly strained relations between the two sides of the river. The GAR Hall was the only public library in Aurora until a Carnegie library opened across the street in 1903. The hall was the meeting place of the Aurora G.A.R. Post No. 20, which was one of 779 posts in the Department of Illinois. Any honorably discharged Union veteran of the war could join the group. The group was formally recognized until the death of its last member, Daniel Augustus Wedge, in 1947.

The Grand Army of the Republic Hall was slated for demolition in the 1960s. Public outcry forced the city to change its plans, and a 1963 fundraising campaign provided financial support to rehabilitate the building. It was added to the National Register of Historic Places in 1984 and was part of the Stolp Island Historic District when it was separately listed in 1986. Renovations were partially completed in 2016, and the hall was opened to the public as "The Grand Army of the Republic Memorial Museum." The G.A.R. Memorial Museum is open every Saturday afternoon, Noon to 4 p.m.

The octagonally-shaped building was built with locally quarried limestone. The standing Gothic Revival structure is one and a half stories and features a small lot outside of the building with an 1851 cannon, a bench, and a flagpole. An addition was constructed in 1884 on the south wing, but was demolished during the 1963 restoration.

== See also ==
- Grand Army of the Republic
- Grand Army of the Republic Hall (disambiguation)
- List of Registered Historic Places in Illinois
- Sons of Union Veterans of the Civil War
