= Hotel Aurora (Aurora, Illinois) =

- U.S. National Register of Historic Places
- U.S. Historic district – Contributing property
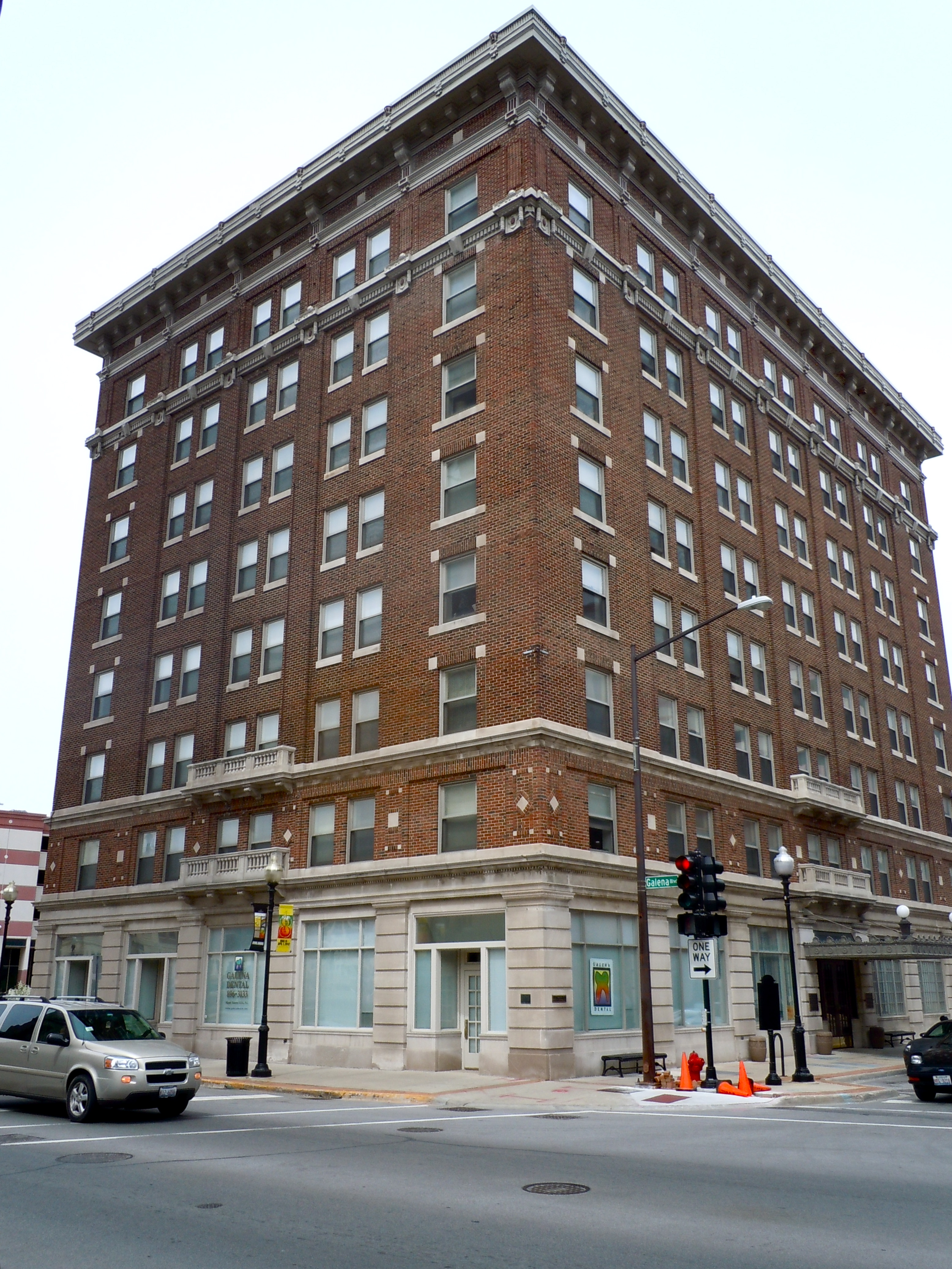

- Location within Illinois Location within the United States
- Location: 2 N. Stolp Ave., Aurora, Illinois
- Coordinates: 41°45′30″N 88°18′54″W
- Area: 0.2 acres (0.081 ha)
- Built: 1917
- Architect: Dietz, H. Ziegler
- NRHP reference No.: 82002544
- Added to NRHP: June 3, 1982

The Hotel Aurora, also known as Aurora Hotel, is a hotel built in 1917 on Stolp Island in Aurora, Illinois, United States.

It was listed on the National Register of Historic Places in 1982.

== History ==
In 1915, a group of businessmen in Aurora, Illinois determined that the city required a first-class hotel. They formed the Aurora Island Hotel Corporation to oversee the project as a branch of the Aurora Island Development Corporation. The site chosen was previously a mill race and swimming hole. Construction on the eight-story building began in 1916. It was the first skyscraper on Stolp Island, Aurora's downtown. The 135-room hotel was opened for business on July 14, 1917. Edwin C. Faber, the general manager of the Chicago Aurora and Elgin Railroad, was the president of the hotel. The structure was designed by H. Ziegler Dietz and built by George W. Caldwell of Caldwell & Marshall. Harry H. Dunbar took over operations in 1919. In 1928, he sold it to William O. Gosselin, who was in the process of building the Leland Hotel on the island. On June 3, 1982, it was listed on the National Register of Historic Places by the National Park Service. On September 10, 1986, it was listed as a contributing property to the Stolp Island Historic District.

== Architecture ==
The hotel is rectangular in shape. The exterior is brick and Indiana limestone. There is a light court in the west facade, creating an indentation. The building is roughly 70 by 100 feet (21 m × 30 m). The first floor is a limestone piano nobile, while the other floor exteriors are mostly brick. A stone course above the second story separates it from the other floors. The east and west facade feature five bays of windows (three are doubled), while the north and south feature seven (five doubled). On the west facade, which faces the Fox River, a two-story porch is cantilevered over the river. Entrances on Galena Boulevard and Stolp Avenue feature double cut limestone balconies with stone balustrades. The Stolp Avenue entrance leads to the main lobby. Inside, the lobby features a pink Tennessee marble floor with a Tennessee dark timber base. Fluted columns are made of black walnut. A grand staircase leads to a second floor mezzanine. The building is supported by reinforced concrete columns with flat slab construction.

== North Island Apartments ==
After falling into disrepair, a community effort led to its renovation in 1996 as apartments for senior citizens, and the building's name was changed to the North Island Apartments.
