= Aurora Elks Lodge No. 705 =

- U.S. National Register of Historic Places
- U.S. Historic district – Contributing property
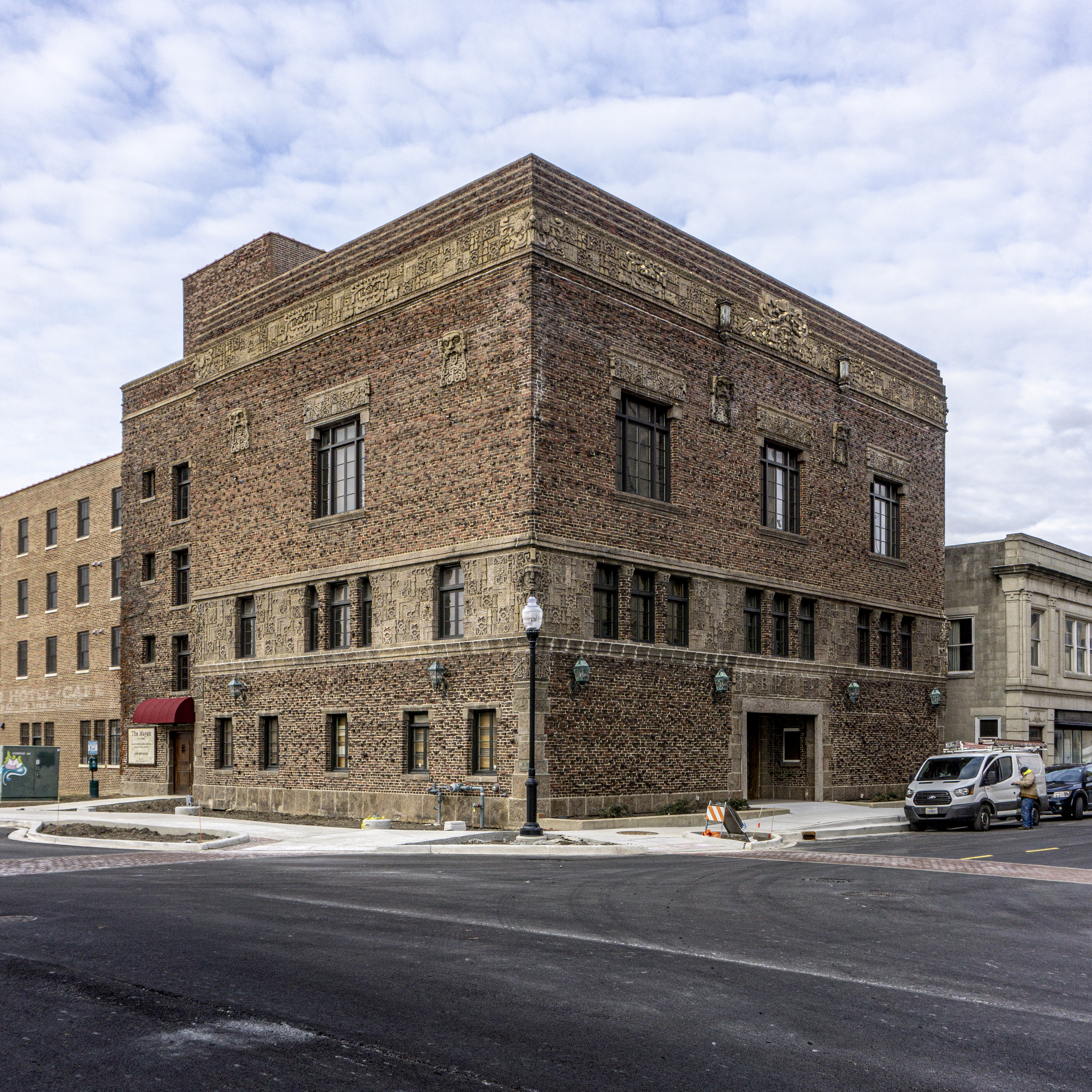

- Location within Illinois Location within the United States
- Location: 77 S. Stolp Ave., Aurora, Illinois
- Coordinates: 41°45′23″N 88°19′2″W
- Area: less than one acre
- Built: 1926
- Architect: Saxe & Zimmerman; Zimmerman, W.C.
- Architectural style: Mayan Revival
- NRHP reference No.: 80001369
- Added to NRHP: March 31, 1980

The Aurora Elks Lodge No. 705 is a Mayan style building on Stolp Island in Aurora, Illinois. It is included in the Stolp Island Historic District. The building was built in 1926 and was listed on the National Register of Historic Places in 1980.

== History ==
The Aurora, Illinois building for the Benevolent and Protective Order of Elks was built in 1926 by Chicago architectural firm Zimmerman, Saxe & Zimmerman. The building's designs were heavily influenced by the archaeological discoveries being widely reported in the 1920s in Mesoamerica. According to members of the lodge, William Carbys Zimmerman spent some time at some of the Late Classic Mayan sites to gather influence for his designs. Specifically, Carbys' designs reflect the Late Classic and early Postclassic Eras. Details include Mayan deities, symbols, and architectural placements. The building is a rare example of a Mayan motif applied to a Prairie School design. It is uncertain why this type of design was chosen, as Mayan symbols do not have any special significance in the Elks community.

This property was purchased in January 2015 by Karademas Management, who will be developing it into residential property consisting of 29 upscale units scheduled to open in the summer of 2015. Plans for a first floor restaurant are also in the works.

== Architecture ==
The building consists of two rectangular sections, one that is three stories tall and one that is four stories. The steel-framed, concrete reinforced structure has a flat roof. The main exterior facade, on the south and east, features horizontal bands of twisted red-brown brick and beige terra-cotta with Mayan glyphs. The three-story section was used as the main lobby, dining rooms, meeting rooms, club offices, ballroom, bars, and lounge. The four-story section was the main dining room and also housed the kitchen, a bar, forty-six rooms for traveling members, and a basement bowling alley.
