= Stolp Woolen Mill Store =

- U.S. National Register of Historic Places
- U.S. Historic district – Contributing property
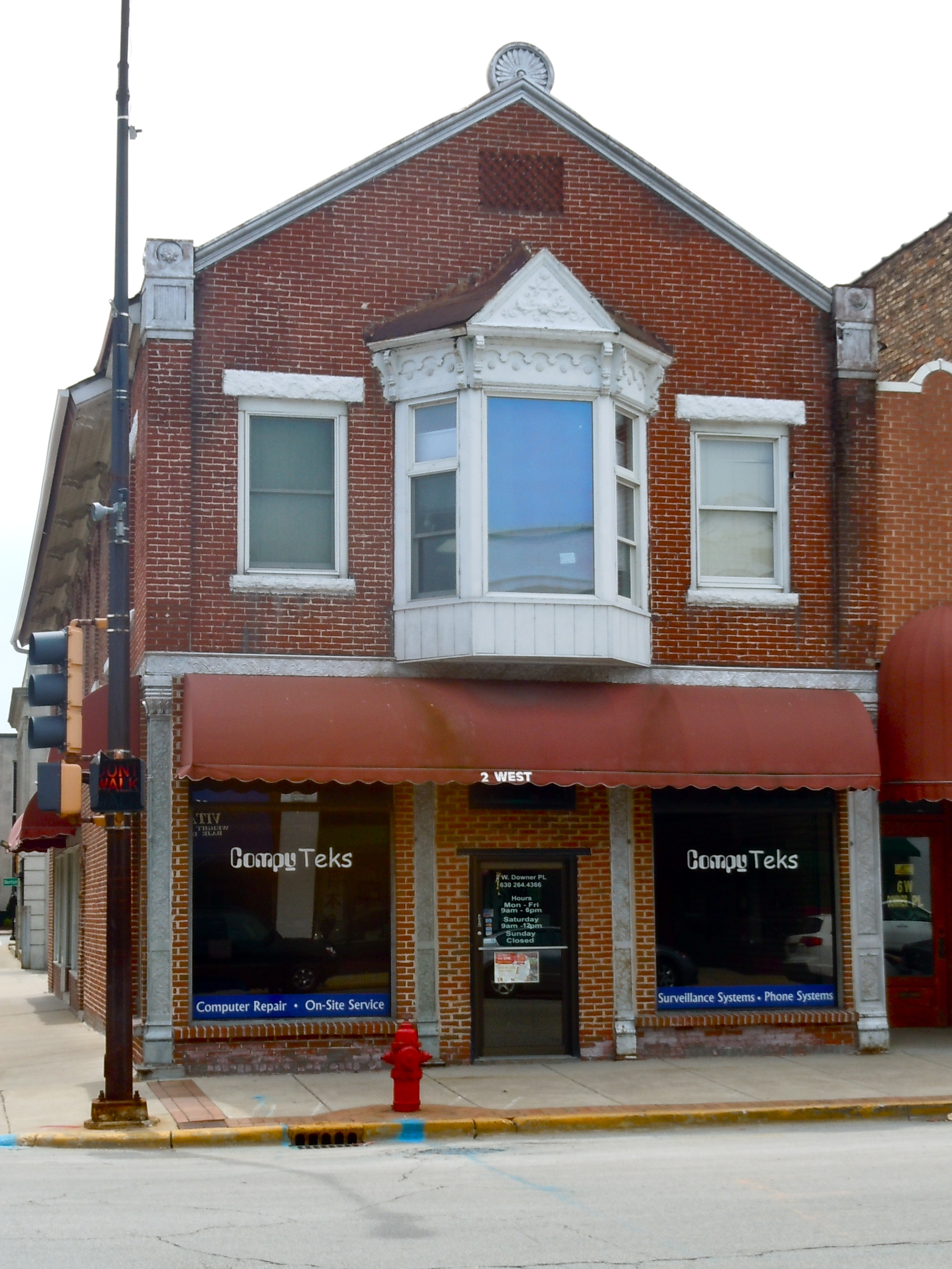
- Stolp Woolen Mill Store in 2011

- Location within Illinois Location within the United States
- Location: 2 W. Downer Pl., Aurora, Illinois
- Coordinates: 41°45′25″N 88°18′59″W
- Area: less than one acre
- Built: 1860
- Architect: Briggs, E. D.
- NRHP reference No.: 83000319
- Added to NRHP: September 01, 1983

The Stolp Woolen Mill Store was built in 1860. It is located on Stolp Island in Aurora, Illinois. It was listed on the National Register of Historic Places in 1983. It is also a contributing building in the Stolp Island Historic District.

== History ==
Joseph G. Stolp built the Stolp Woolen Mill Store in 1861. Stolp was one of the first settlers of Aurora, Illinois and operated a wool carding business. Stolp had previously worked in wool manufacturing in Marcellus, New York. His first office was built in 1837 in a small frame building on Stolp Island. He bought a brick mill in 1849 and continued to grow the business. By the 1860s, he needed a new place to sell his goods outside of the mill. The growth of the railroad industry dramatically increased competition against Stolp's business, and he had to shut down the mill in 1887. The mill store was rented to C. C. Hinckley & Co., a local producer of watchmaking tools, and J. D. Rice & Sons, a painting and decoration company. In 1889, Stolp improved the building by rehabilitating the interior and adding an extension on the east. The mill store is the oldest building still standing on Stolp Island today. The building was recognized as a Historic Place by the National Park Service on September 1, 1983 and was listed as part of the Stolp Island Historic District when it was created three years later.

== Architecture ==
The mill store building is 80 by 25 feet (24.4 m × 7.6 m) on the southwest corner of Downer Place and Stolp Avenue. The main entrance on the north was built during Stolp's 1889 renovation. Since then, the facade has been updated with modern wood and glass, but the design has not changed. An oriel window projects from the second floor with a flat window on either side. The bay window has a shallow cornice above the windows, with an ornamented pediment above the central window. A palmette design adorns the top of the gable at the apex. The first floor on the north side was updated to a modern glass storefront. piers can be found on either side of the facade, detailed at the time with limestone fluting. The only other exposed elevation is the eastern facade. The northernmost window remains from the 1889 addition with a limestone lintel.
