= Memorial Hall (Foxborough, Massachusetts) =

- U.S. National Register of Historic Places
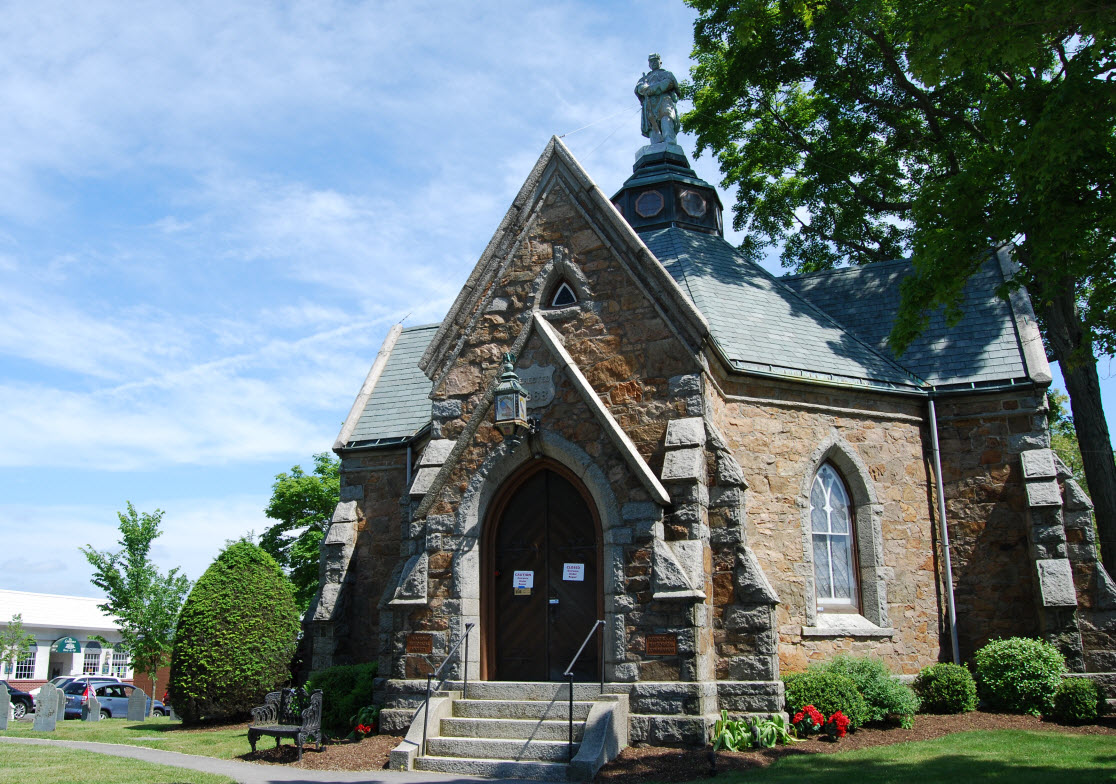

- Location within Massachusetts Location within the United States
- Location: Foxborough, Massachusetts
- Coordinates: 42°3′50″N 71°15′2″W
- Built: 1868
- Architect: John Stevens
- Architectural style: Gothic
- NRHP reference No.: 83000597
- Added to NRHP: April 21, 1983

Memorial Hall is a historic Grand Army of the Republic hall at 22 South Street in Foxborough, Massachusetts, United States. It is a single-story granite Gothic Revival structure, octagonal in shape, with four projecting wings and a turret capped by a statue of a Union Army soldier (carved in wood by noted sculptor by Charles H. Pizzano).

The hall was built in 1868, and for many years housed Foxborough's public library.

The building was listed on the National Register of Historic Places in 1983. The Grand Army of the Republic Hall in Aurora, Illinois is very closely based on this structure.

== See also ==
- National Register of Historic Places listings in Norfolk County, Massachusetts
