= Graham Building (Aurora, Illinois) =

- U.S. National Register of Historic Places
- U.S. Historic district – Contributing property
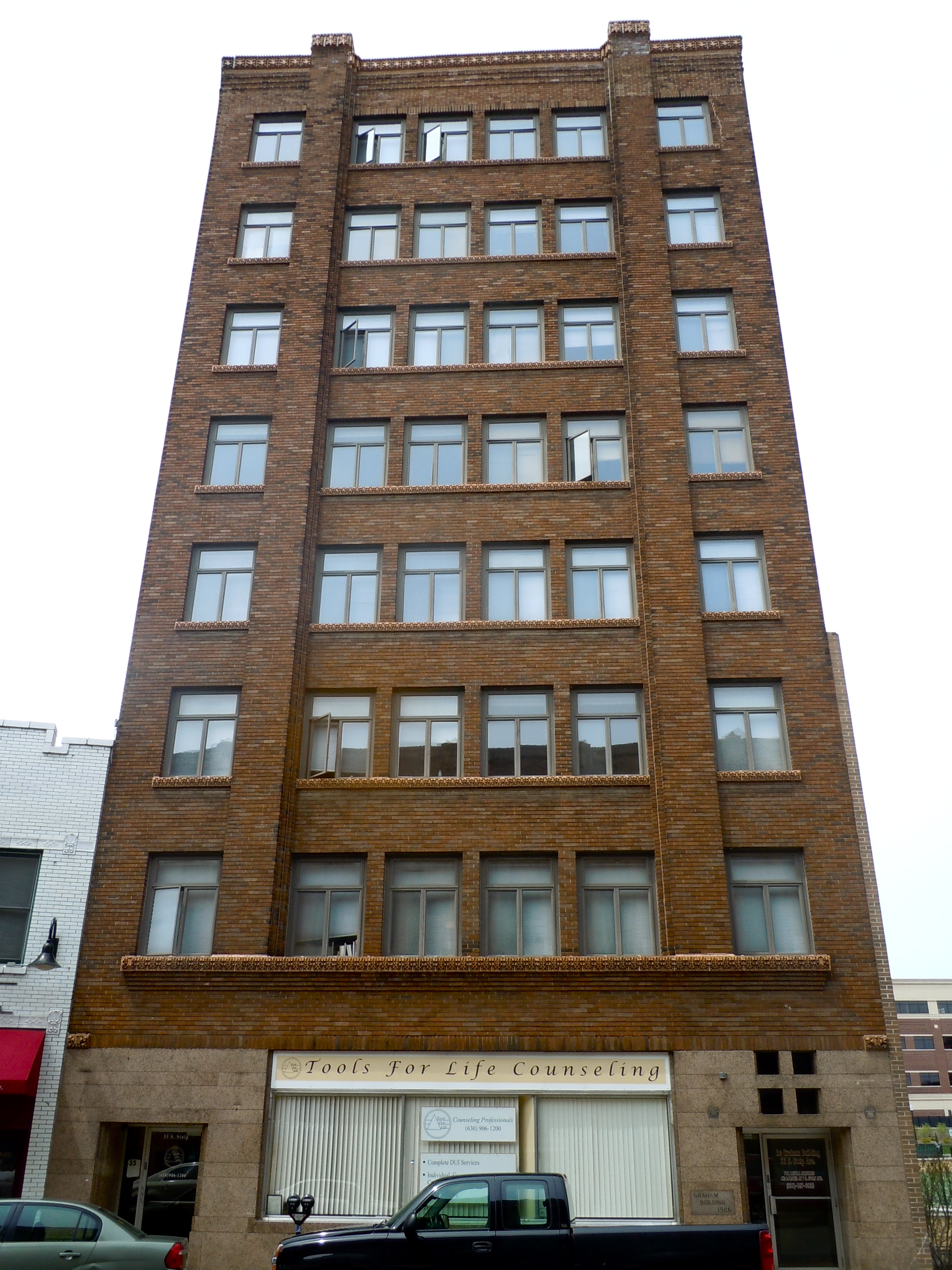
- Graham Building in 2011

- Location within Illinois Location within the United States
- Location: 33 S. Stolp Ave., Aurora, Illinois
- Coordinates: 41°45′26″N 88°18′57″W
- Area: 0.1 acres (0.040 ha)
- Built: 1926
- Architect: Elmslie, George G.; Gramham, William
- Architectural style: Prairie School
- NRHP reference No.: 82002543
- Added to NRHP: March 19, 1982

The Graham Building is a 1926 Prairie style building on Stolp Island in Aurora, Illinois. It was individually listed on the National Register of Historic Places in 1982. Also, it is a contributing property in a historic district.

== History ==
The Graham Building was designed by George Grant Elmslie, a leading student of Louis Sullivan. It was one of five buildings Elmslie designed in Aurora, Illinois. The Graham Building is the tallest of the buildings he designed for the city. William Graham was a contractor who commissioned the building. He immigrated from Nova Scotia, Canada in the 1890s. He owned this building until his death in the 1950s. The National Park Service listed it on the National Register of Historic Places on March 19, 1982. On September 10, 1986, it was listed as a contributing property to the Stolp Island Historic District.

== Architecture ==
The eight-story building was designed the Prairie School architectural style. It is trapezoidal in shape, and is built with steel-reinforced concrete. The exterior is brick in a stretcher bond, with a polished granite first floor street facade. Casement windows with transoms are wood-framed. Windows on the side façades are standard double-hung units. Little attention was given to these elevations, as it was anticipated that adjacent office buildings would soon be constructed. The entry doors are recessed 4 feet (1.2 m) from the edge of the openings. The main facades at Stolp Avenue and the Fox River feature decorative terracotta and brick coursing designs below the second story windows.
