= All-Steel Equipment Company =

Allsteel
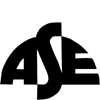
- Type: Public company
- Founded: 1912
- Headquarters: Aurora, Illinois USA
- Key people: John Knell, President Charles Lembcke, General Manager
- Products: Office furniture, chairs, filing cabinets, workstations, tables, desks
- Website: www.allsteeloffice.com

Allsteel was founded in 1912 as Allsteelequip Company and started out manufacturing custom metal objects, especially electrical equipment. The name was changed in 1929 to All-Steel-Equip Company. In the 1920s, the company began to branch out and started producing kitchen cabinets and refrigerated food lockers. Requests for metal file cabinets were becoming common, so the company bought out a supplier, the Aurora Metal Cabinet Company, in 1936 to enter this market.

== History ==
After World War II, All-Steel-Equip began manufacturing desks, starting in 1947. It introduced bookcases, telephone stands and credenzas soon afterward. Also in 1947, the company's Los Angeles showroom appeared in Miracle on 34th Street. To complete its line of office furniture, All-Steel-Equip bought the Shepherd Chair Company of Melrose Park, Illinois and redesigned their products. All-Steel's line of office furniture was wildly successful and by 1966 it was the third-largest producer of steel office furniture worldwide. Its products are known for durability, and many are still in use while others have been restored by antique furniture dealers.

The company was acquired in 1966 by C.I.T. Financial, a holding group, and was merged with B.K. Johl, a Canadian manufacturer of office furniture. All-Steel-Equip pioneered the lateral file in 1967, with production beginning in 1969, and it became a huge commercial success. The company restructured after the merger with B.K. Johl, and in 1973 renamed its furniture divisions All-Steel Inc. and All-Steel Canada Ltd., both of which reduced to Allsteel in 1986. Allsteel was bought and sold by a number of different holding companies and finally merged into HNI Corporation in 1998. Its archives are held by Past Present Future (a furniture restoration store) in Minneapolis.

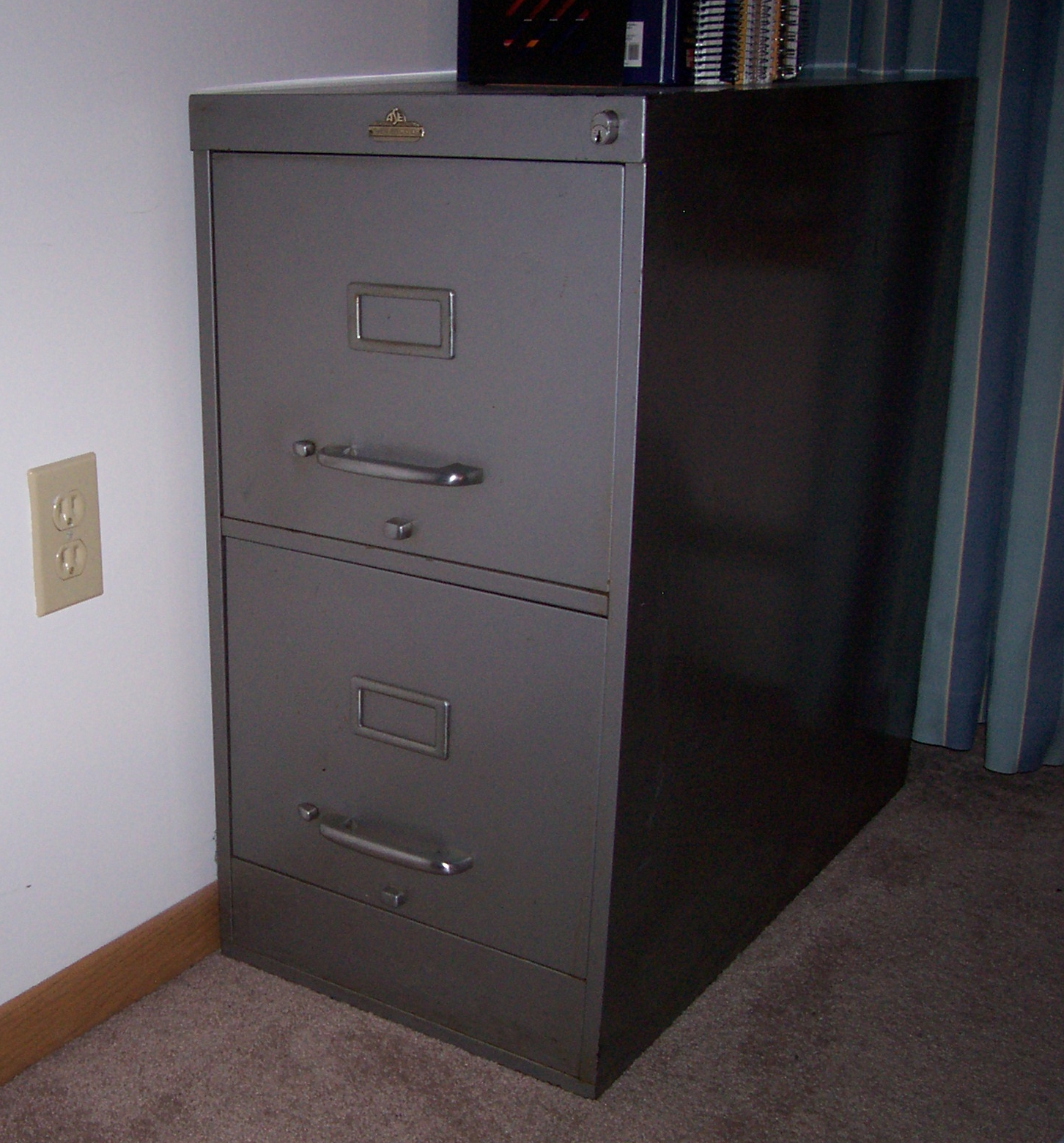
A file cabinet by All-Steel Equipment
