= Leland Tower =

- U.S. Historic district – Contributing property
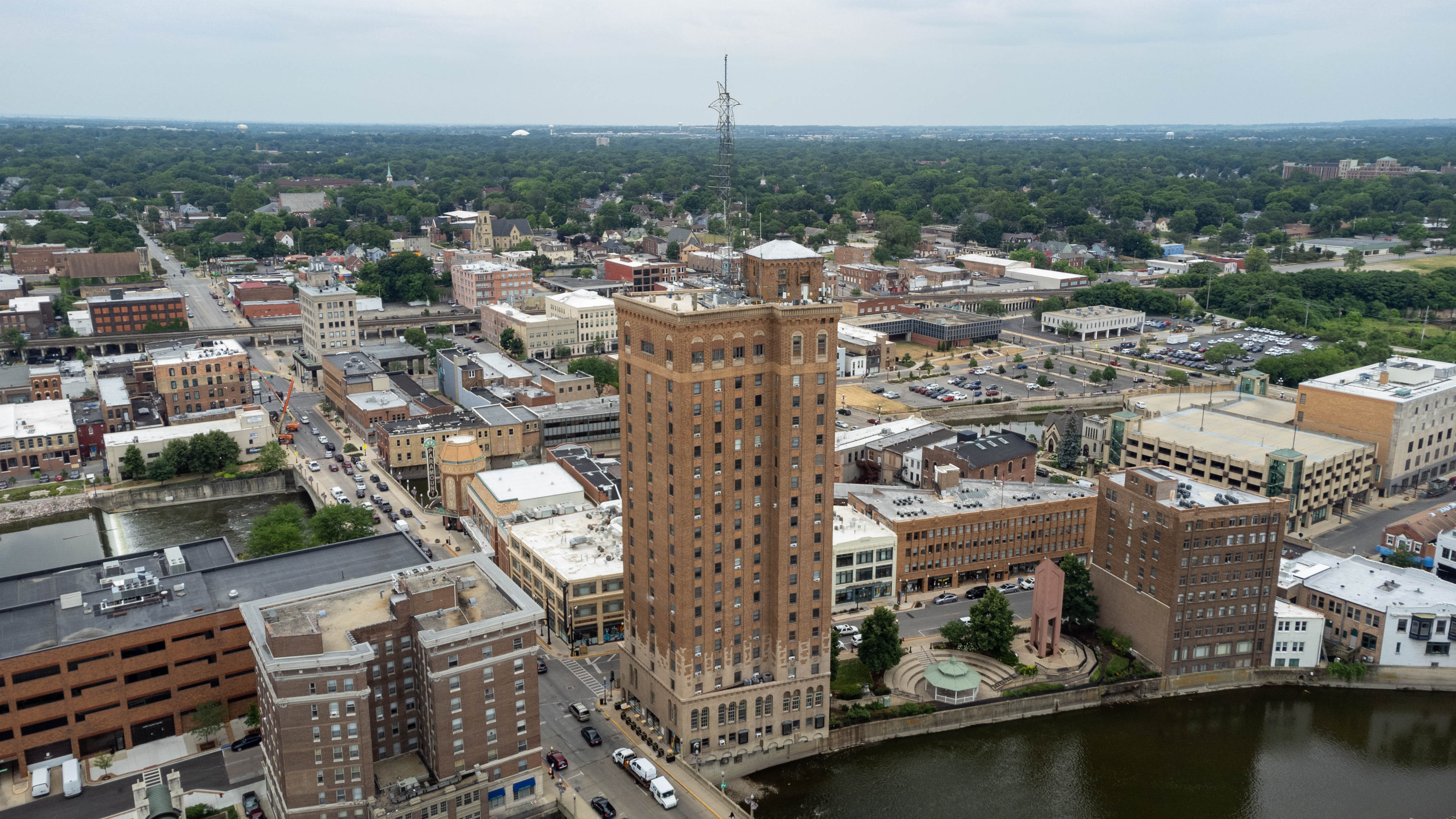
- Location: Aurora, Illinois, USA
- Coordinates: 41°45′29″N 88°18′55″W
- Built: 1928
- Part of: Stolp Island Historic District (ID86001487)
- Added to NRHP: September 10, 1986

Leland Tower is a twenty-two-story building on Stolp Island in Aurora, Illinois. Leland Tower was at one point the tallest building in Illinois outside of Chicago. Stolp Island is recognized as a Historical District by the National Register of Historic Places.

Leland Tower was built initially as a hotel. The Leland Hotel project was conceived in 1926 and was one of the most ambitious projects in the city's history. The project was announced by an organization known as the Aurora Building Corporation through Herbert P. Heiss of the First Illinois Company. Mr. Heiss had located and purchased the site for the proposed hotel. The building contract was awarded to the H.G. Christman Company, general contractors of South Bend, Indiana and Detroit, Michigan. Anker Sveere Graven and Arthur Guy Mayger were chosen to design the hotel.

The Aurora-Leland Hotel had all the amenities of the time, including telephones in every room. Topping this skyscraper was the Sky Club, a dinner and dancing club. The views from the Sky Club made it a place to see and be seen by local socialites. "Swanks" from Chicago thought the Sky Club a fun place to take their dates. Philip K. Wrigley, fan dancer Sally Rand, and the singing cowboy Gene Autry are some of the famous names seen there. Recordings were made there by blues musicians as John Lee "Sonny Boy" Williamson.

In the 1960s, the times and the economy caused the hotel once known as "The Aurora-Leland Hotel", the "Illinois Hotel" and the "Leland Hotel" to stop operations. The tower subsequently housed microwave transmitter link of defunct WLXT-TV Channel 60, an Aurora TV station which signed on in 1969. It was on the air afternoons, evenings and weekends. It also served as the transmitter site of 107.9 WAUR-FM.

Leland Tower is also known locally for its elaborate holiday decorations, including an 8-story tall shooting star and Christmas tree on the roof.

== Images ==
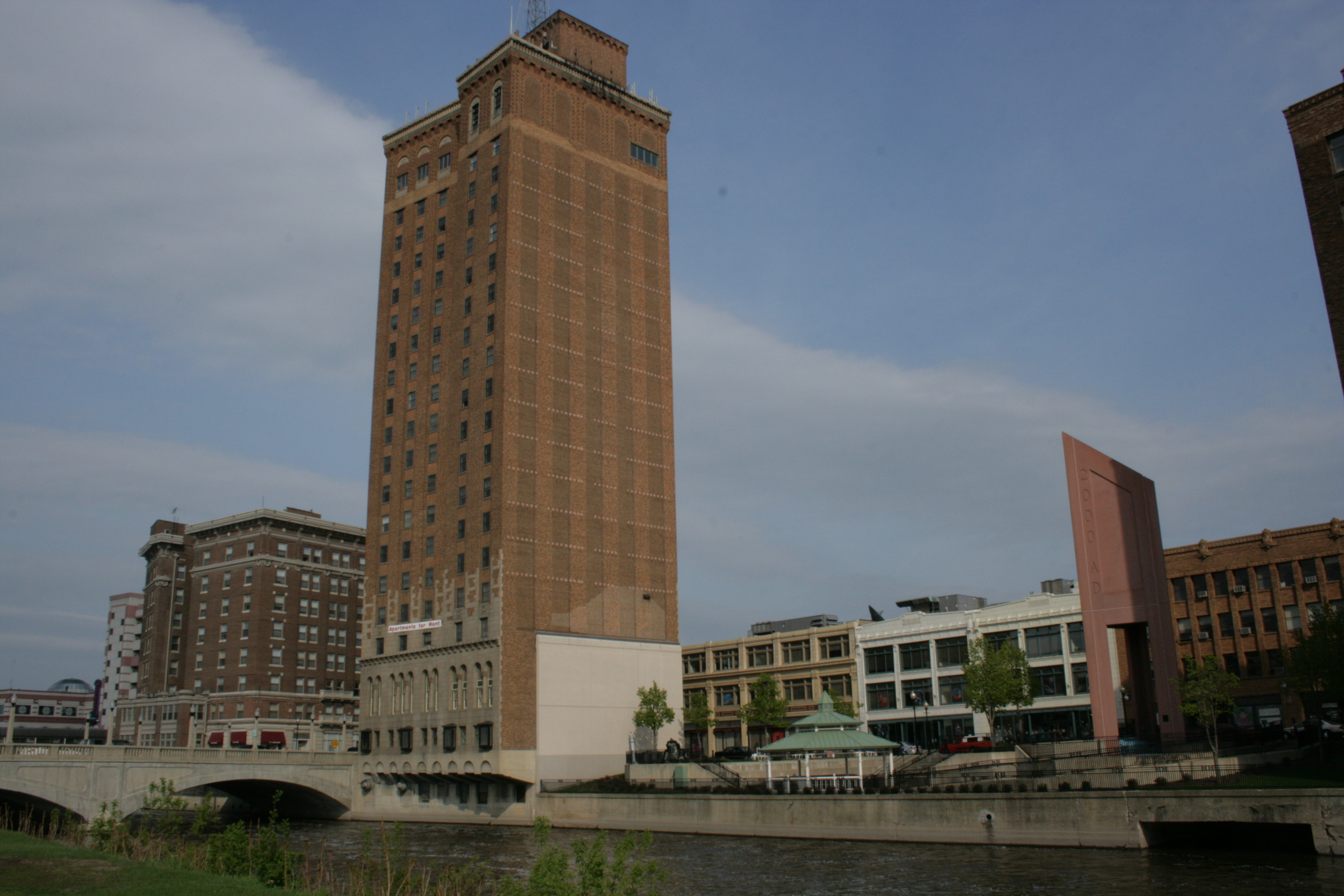
View from the West side

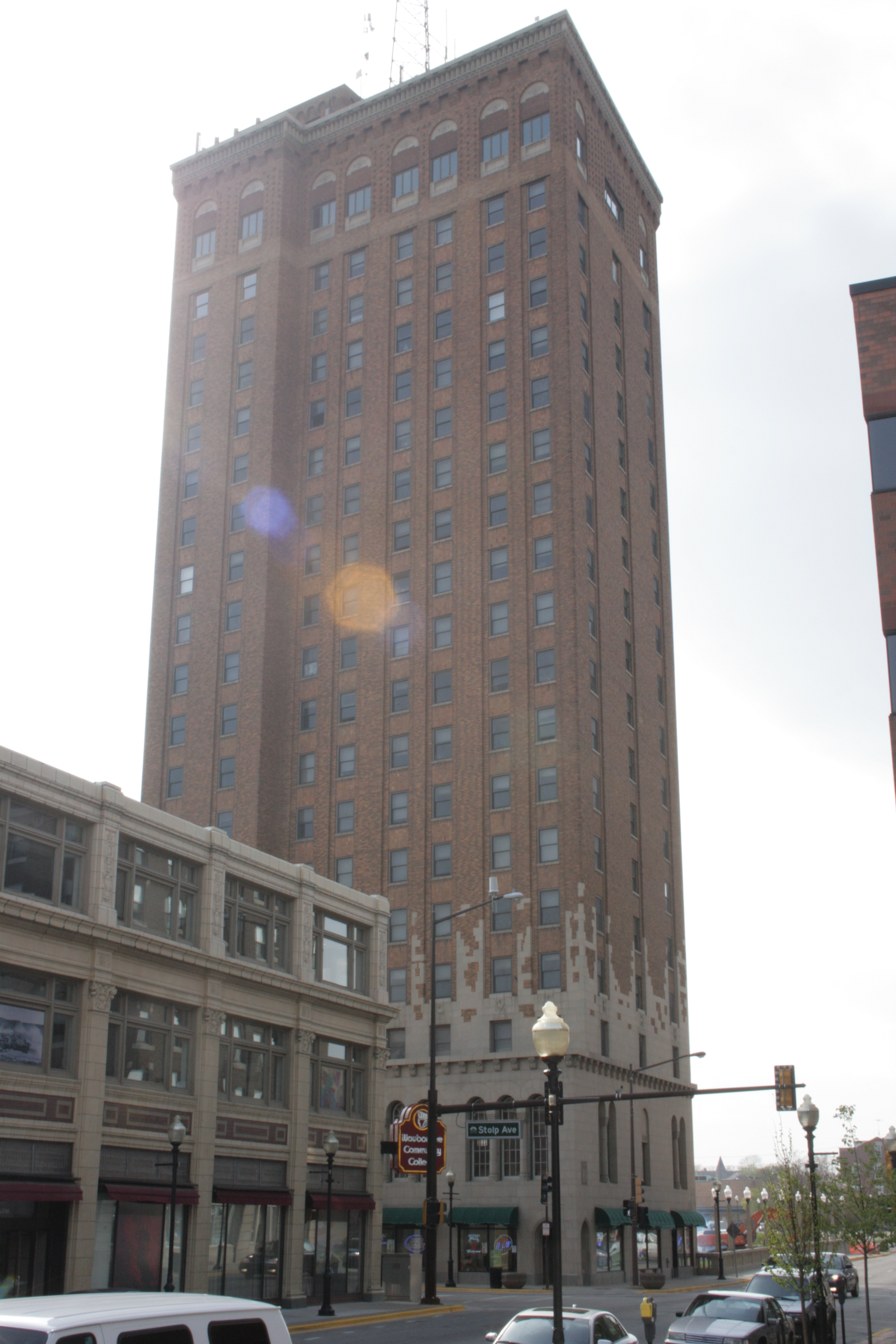
View from the East side
