= Tryout (theatre) =

Out-of-town staging in anticipation of a New York or London premiere

A tryout is the staging of performances of a theatrical production (i.e., a play or musical) at an out-of-town venue for evaluation and possible revision before the production premieres on Broadway or in the West End (i.e., the highest level of live theater in the English-speaking world). A tryout is similar to a workshop production in that the point is to identify and eliminate embarrassing flaws before the production is put on before highly demanding New York or London audiences.

Unlike a workshop, a tryout is usually much more developed, less rough, and closer to the intended final product. If a tryout goes well and irons out the last few bugs, then that assures the project's investors of its eventual success on Broadway or in the West End, it will already be polished, more likely to receive favorable reviews and play to strong houses for a long run, so they can recoup their investment. Conversely, tryouts enable theatrical audiences in less prestigious markets to preview potential future hits and get bragging rights that they saw those works first.

== Popular tryout locations ==
Some regional theaters and off-Broadway theatres have been particularly successful in sending shows, including eventual Tony Award winners to Broadway. U.S. cities where successful tryouts led to Broadway productions include:

- New Haven, Connecticut: Oklahoma!, The King and I, My Fair Lady, 1776
- Philadelphia: Street Scene, Kiss Me, Kate, A Raisin in the Sun
- Boston: Porgy and Bess, Follies, La Cage aux Folles, High Fidelity (musical), Moulin Rouge! (musical)
- Detroit: Hello, Dolly!, Sweet Charity, Seesaw
- Washington, D.C.: Show Boat, West Side Story, 42nd Street
- San Diego: Rumors, Thoroughly Modern Millie, Jersey Boys
- Los Angeles: Peter Pan, The Happy Time, Brighton Beach Memoirs
- Seattle: Hairspray, The Light in the Piazza, Catch Me If You Can
- Atlanta: Bring It On: The Musical, Tuck Everlasting (musical), The Prom (musical)
- San Francisco: Wicked, Legally Blonde, A Chorus Line (2006 revival), Beautiful: The Carole King Musical
