= Tri-Cities (Illinois) =

Coordinates: 41°50′N 88°18′W

- Region
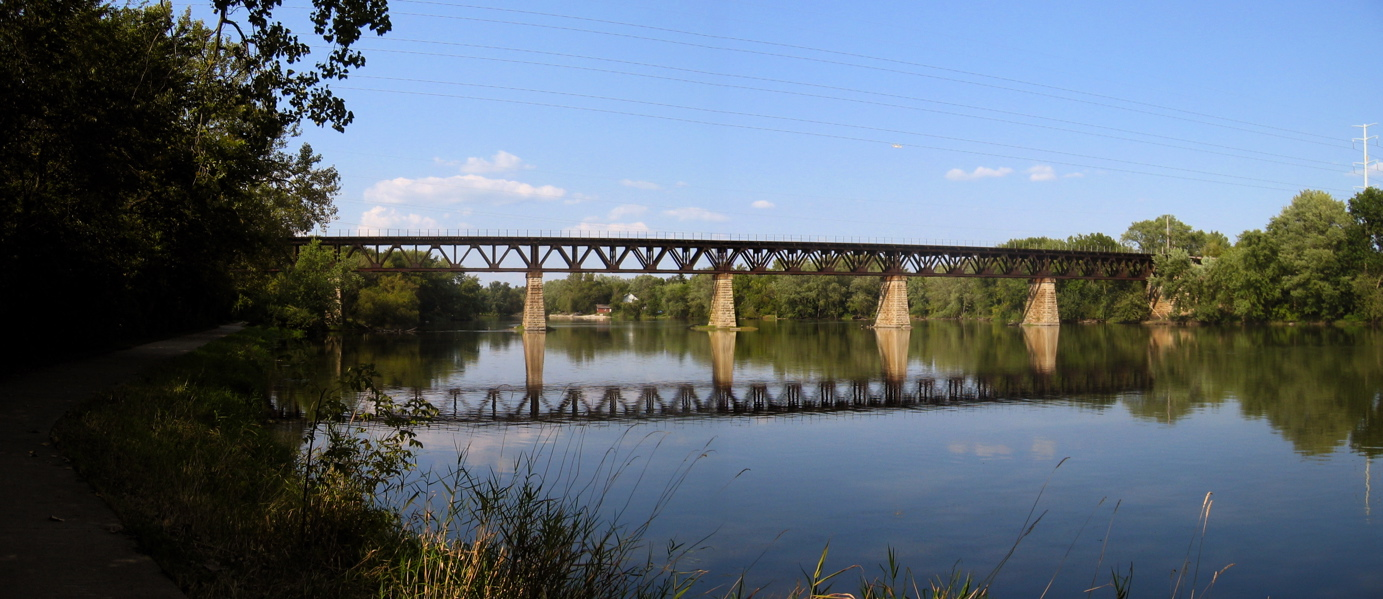
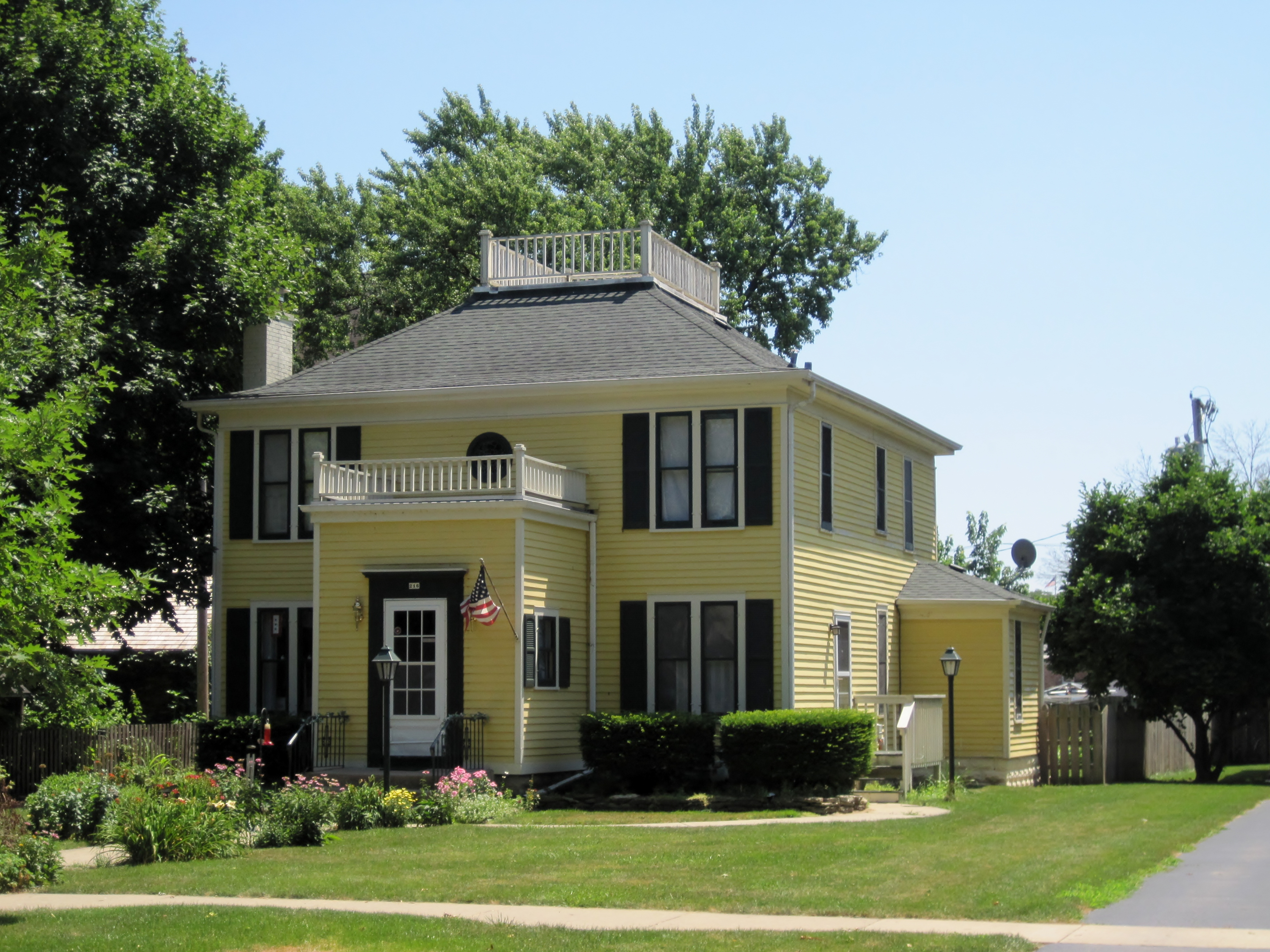
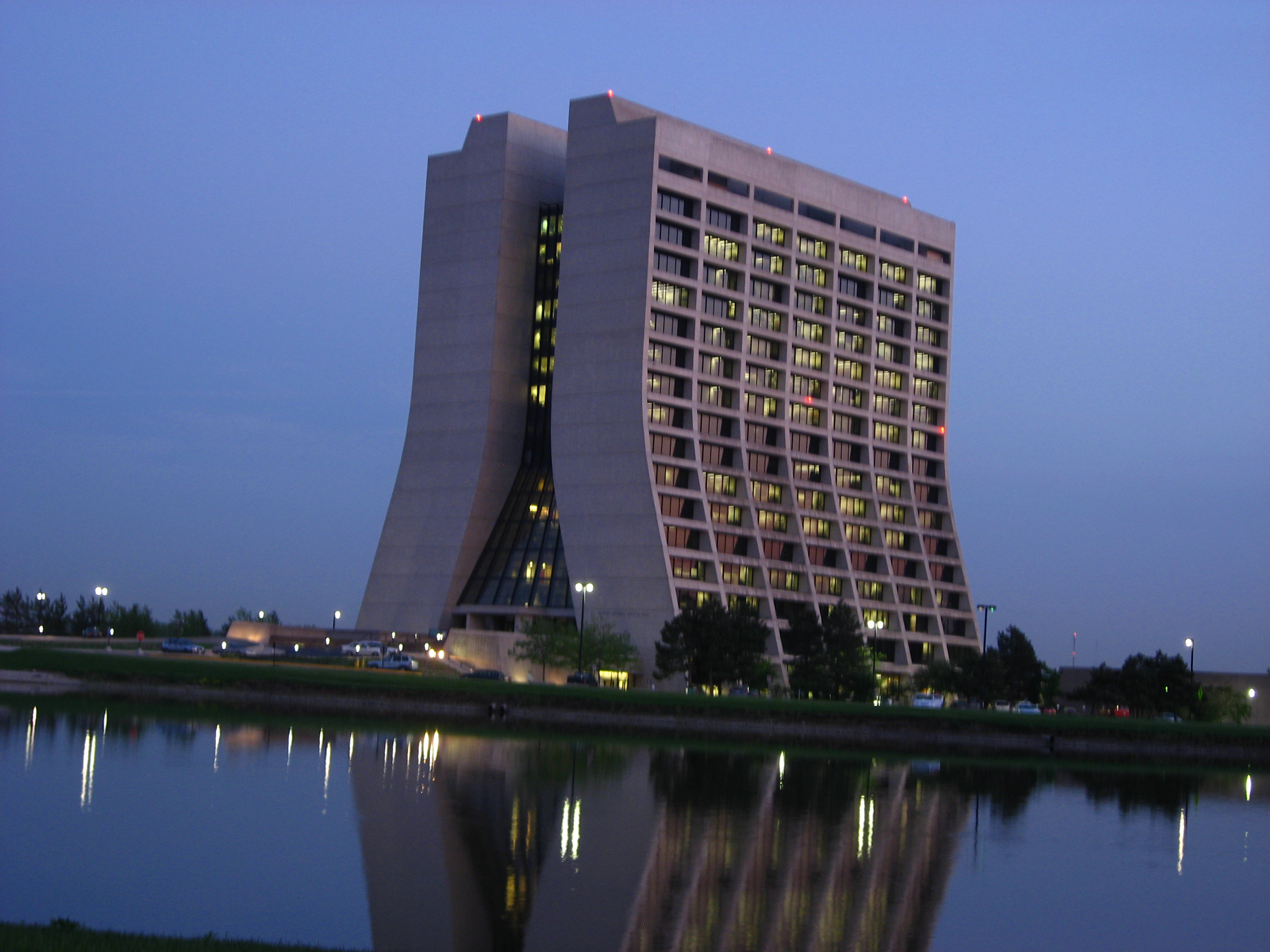
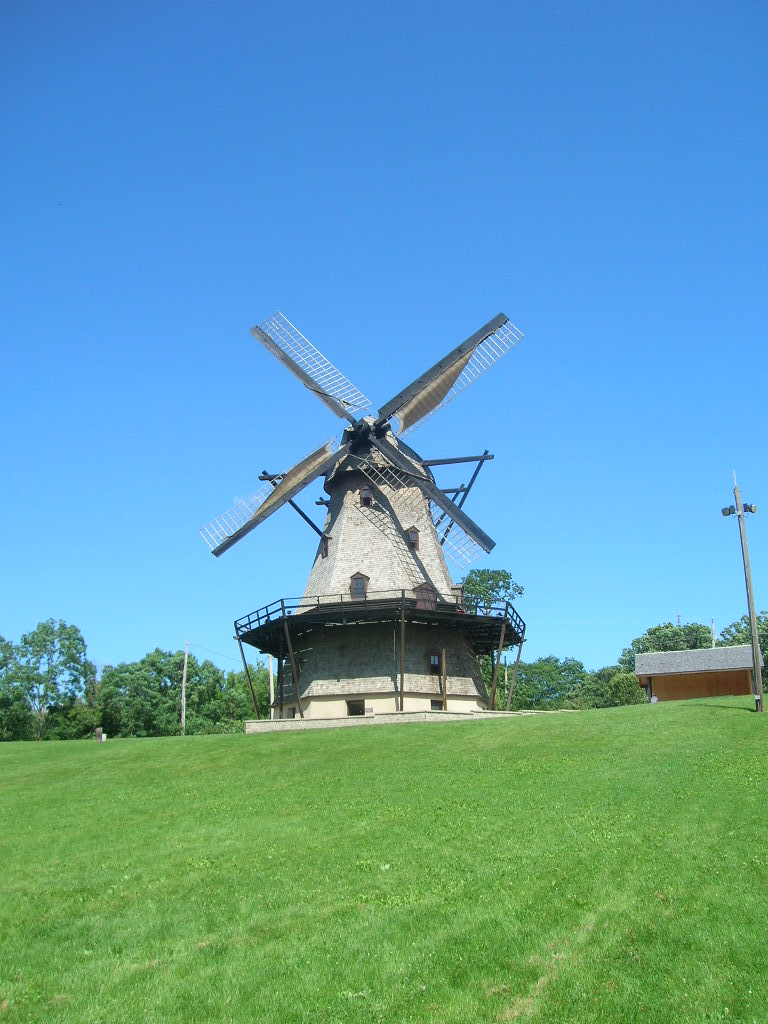
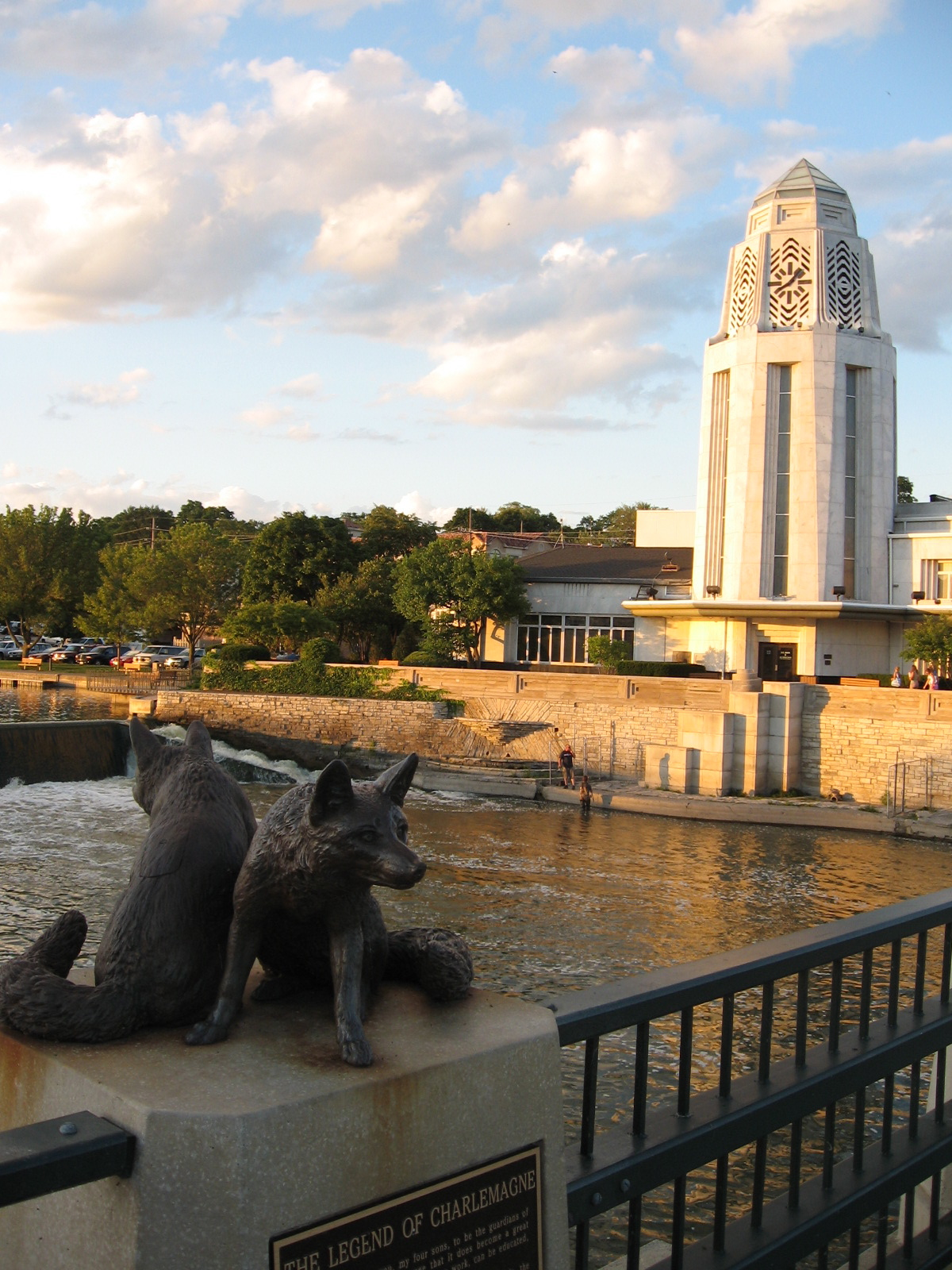
- Clockwise from top: Fox River, Fermi National Accelerator Laboratory, St. Charles Municipal Building, Dutch Mill in Batavia, Central Geneva Historic District
- Interactive map of Tri-Cities
- Country: United States of America
- State: Illinois
- County: Kane, DuPage
- Founded: 1833-1835
- Townships: List of townships: Batavia; Geneva; St. Charles; Wayne (DuPage); Winfield (DuPage)

Government
  - Mayor of Batavia: Jeffery D. Schielke
  - Mayor of Geneva: Kevin Burns
  - Mayor of St. Charles: Lora Vitek

Population (2014)
  - Total: 81,532 (est.)
- Time zone: UTC-6 (CST)
- ZIP codes: 60510, 60134, 60174, 60175
- Area codes: 630

The Tri-Cities, or Tri-City area, is a vernacular region that is situated between the large cities of Aurora and Elgin, Illinois, and encompasses the cities of Batavia, Geneva, and St. Charles.

The Tri-City area is primarily located in Kane County, though Batavia and St. Charles include parcels in DuPage County. The three communities are often grouped together due to their shared history, close proximity on the Fox River, relative socioeconomic condition, and similar population sizes. They are among the oldest in Kane County as well as the state.

== History of the name ==
The earliest known use of "Tri-City" to refer to the region came in 1910, with the publication of the first edition of the Tri-City Directory: Batavia, Geneva, St. Charles, by the Evans Directory Service of Elgin, Illinois. There were ten editions of the Tri-City Directory published from 1910 to 1943. During this same period, the local telephone directories served all three cities, as well.

There are other origin stories. In 2011, Batavia Mayor Jeffery D. Schielke has theorized that the Tri-City moniker originated in the early 20th century from the deviation of the railroad track between Aurora and Elgin to the three cities, which conductors nicknamed the Tri-Cities. Former St. Charles mayor Norris has theorized that the nickname grew in popularity during the 1940s and 1950s, when the area experienced a relative population boom and the boundaries of the cities began to move closer and closer together. Nowadays, the Tri-City area is bonded by retail and industrial corridors on Kirk and Randall Roads, joint policy decisions, area organizations, and the Fox River.

== Historic places ==
- The Fabyan Windmill located in Geneva
- The Fabyan Villa in Geneva
- The Arcada Theater in St. Charles
- The Hotel Baker in downtown St. Charles.
- The Batavia Depot Museum in downtown Batavia.
- The Batavia Institute in Batavia, a former sanitarium where Mary Todd Lincoln stayed.
- The historic Campana Factory in Batavia.

== Points of interest ==
- Fermi National Accelerator Laboratory in Batavia
- The Illinois Prairie Path and the Fox River Trail
- The historic downtowns of Batavia, Geneva and St. Charles

== Demographics ==
The following demographics represent an average of the three cities.

There were approximately 31,477 housing units in the Tri-City Area. The racial makeup of the area, on average, was 91.83% White, 1.80% Black or African American, 0.17% Native American, 2.40% Asian, 0.00% Pacific Islander, and 1.39% from two or more races. On average, Hispanic or Latino of any race were 7.30% of the population.

There were 30,666 households in the area. The average household size was 2.66.

In the city, the population was spread out, with 26.47% under the age of 18, and 11.63% who were 65 years of age or older. The Tri-Cities are split fairly evenly between males and females, with a female population of 50.7%.

The average per capita income for the area was $42,575. About 5.1% of the population was below the poverty line.

According to the 2008 U.S. Census Bureau estimate, the average median income for a household in the area was $87,861, the average median income for a family was $107,108 and the median home value was $290,567.

== Education ==
=== Colleges ===
There are no four-year institutions located in any of the Tri-Cities. Batavia had bid on being the host of Illinois State University but ultimately lost to Normal. The University of Illinois has a satellite office in St. Charles.

Nearby colleges include:

- Aurora University in Aurora
- Judson University in Elgin
- Wheaton College in Wheaton
- Northern Illinois University in DeKalb

=== Community colleges ===
Batavia and Geneva are both served by Waubonsee Community College. St. Charles is served by Elgin Community College.

=== Secondary schools ===
- Batavia High School
- Geneva Community High School
- St. Charles North High School
- St. Charles East High School
- West Aurora High School - serves the extreme southwestern side of Batavia

== Neighboring communities ==
- Aurora, Illinois
- Elgin, Illinois
- West Chicago, Illinois
- Wayne, Illinois
- Warrenville, Illinois
- Bartlett, Illinois
- North Aurora, Illinois
- South Elgin, Illinois
- Campton Hills, Illinois
- Kaneland (Sugar Grove, Elburn, Kaneville, LaFox, Lily Lake, Maple Park)

== Transportation ==
=== Transit ===
- Bus transportation serviced by Pace
- Nearest Metra train stations are located in Geneva, Aurora, and Elgin.

=== Major roads ===
- Illinois Route 64
- Illinois Route 38
- Illinois Route 25
- Illinois Route 31
- Randall Road

== See also ==
- Batavia, Illinois
- Geneva, Illinois
- St. Charles, Illinois
- List of cities in Illinois
- National Register of Historic Places listings in Kane County, Illinois
