= Wolfgang Hoffmann =

Austrian-American architect and designer (1900–1969)

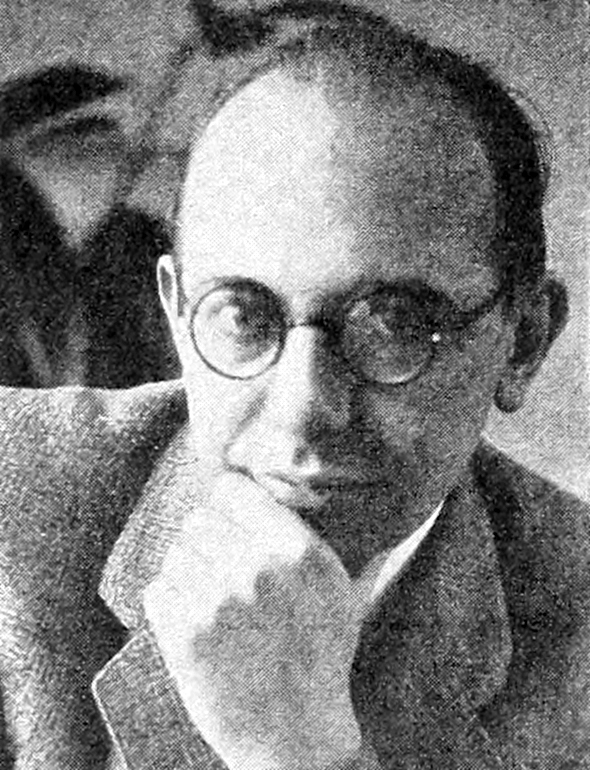
- Hoffmann in 1929
- Born: 21 October 1900; Klosterneuburg, Wien-Umgebung District, Austria-Hungary
- Died: 16 February 1969 (aged 68); Geneva, Illinois, U.S.
- Occupations: Architect, furniture and interior designer, photographer
- Spouses: Pola Stout (m. 1925–1932); Ann Hoffmann
- Children: 1
- Parent(s): Josef Hoffmann, father
- Design: American modernism

Wolfgang Hoffmann (October 21, 1900 – February 16, 1969) was an Austrian-American architect and designer active in the American modernism movement between 1926 and 1942. His reputation was overshadowed by that of his father, the architect and designer Josef Hoffmann, and ex-wife, Josefine Pola Weinbach Hoffmann, better known as Pola Stout.

== Early life and education ==
Hoffmann was born in Klosterneuburg, near Vienna, Austria in 1900, the son of the architect, pedagogue and Wiener Werkstatte co-founder Josef Hoffmann. Following eight years at the Realschule, he spent another three years at a special architectural school. Graduating from the Kunstgewerbeschule (University of Applied Arts, Vienna), where he studied under Oskar Strnad and Josef Frank, he spent a year-and-a-half gaining practical experience in an architect's office before joining his father's firm for two years.

=== Marriage and emigration to U.S. ===
In 1925 the architect Joseph Urban, working in New York, wrote to Josef Hoffmann asking him to recommend an assistant. Hoffmann recommended his son Wolfgang, and Urban sent him a first-class passage ticket to join him in the United States.

While studying at the Kunstgewerbeschule Wolfgang met his father's student Pola Weinbach, who had come from Stryi to study in Vienna. Following Urban's invitation to America, Wolfgang and Pola were married in Vienna. Wolfgang converted his first class ticket to two steerage tickets, and the two set sail. The couple arrived in New York in December 1925. The Hoffmanns were among the immigrants who made significant contributions to the development of American modernism and the American Modern design aesthetic in the early 20th century. They were among those who established the American Union of Decorative Artists and Craftsmen (AUDAC), the most ambitious professional design group of the era.

== New York ==
The Hoffmanns worked for Urban for nine months, and then set up their own design firm with an office on Madison Avenue in Manhattan. They created design for stores, theaters and private residences throughout the late 1920s and early 1930s. Their custom furniture appeared in the February 1929 issue of House & Garden magazine.

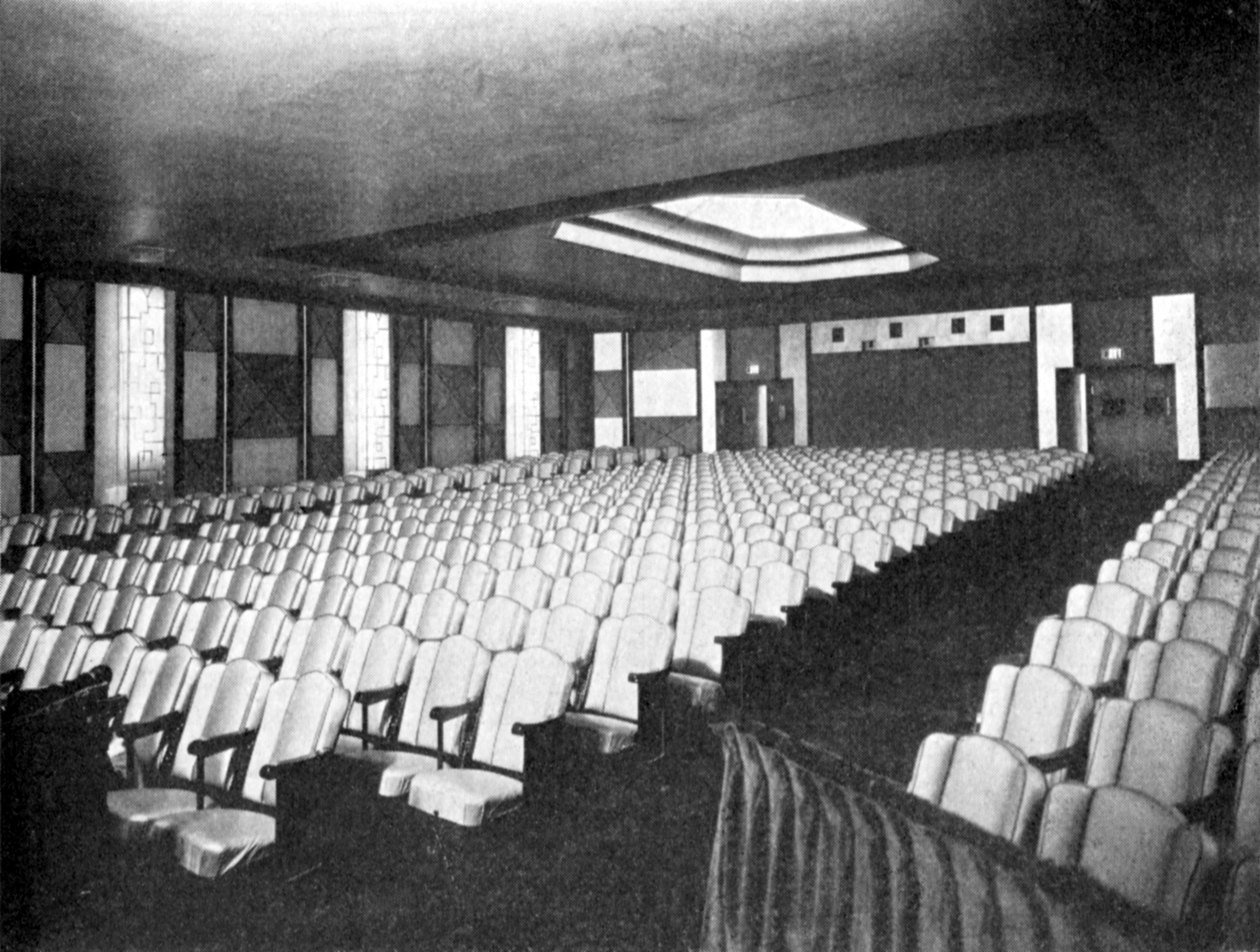
Auditorium of the Little Carnegie Playhouse by Wolfgang and Pola Hoffmann, architects (1928)

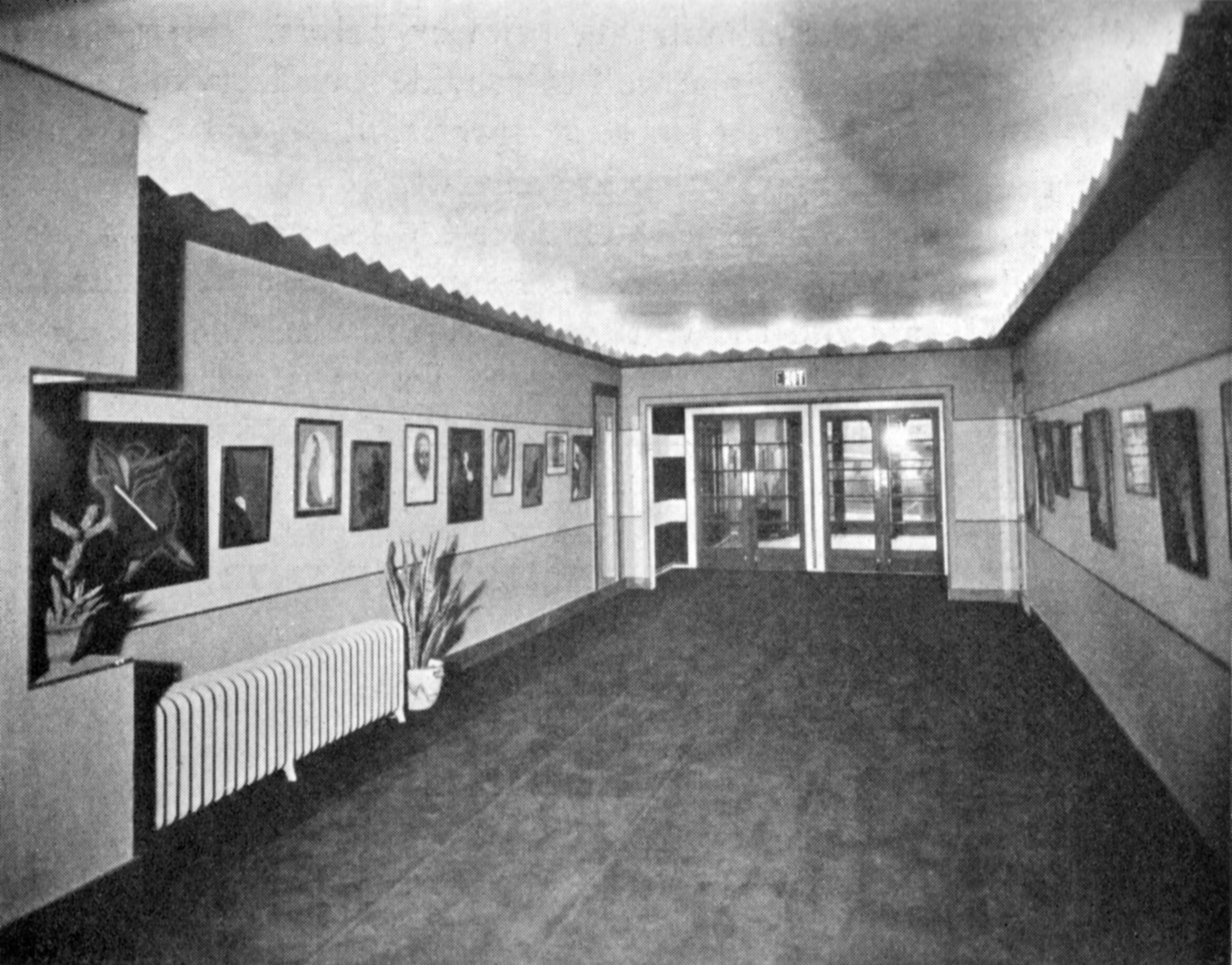
Art gallery in the Little Carnegie Playhouse (1928)

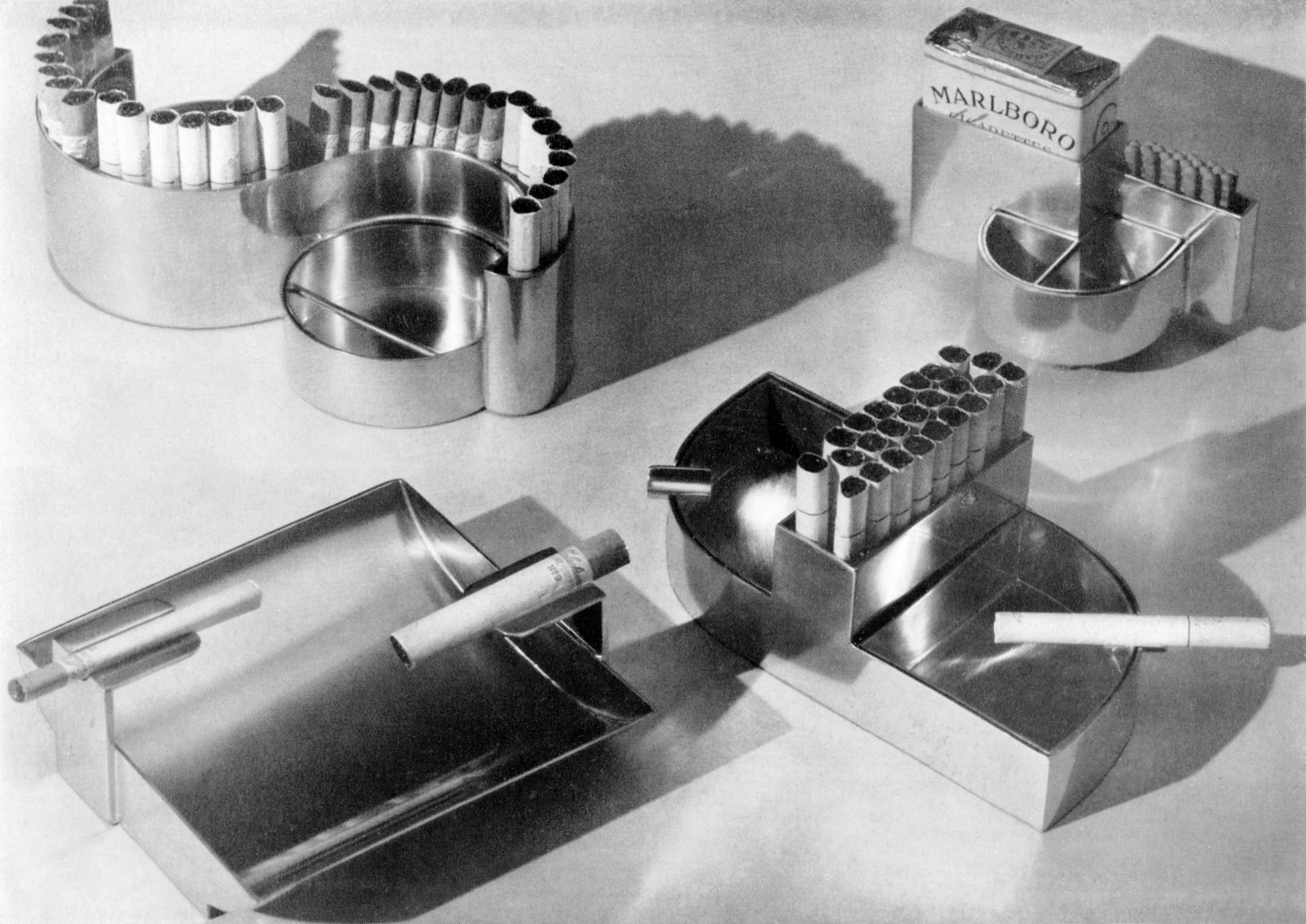
Light pewter cigarette and ash trays by Wolfgang and Pola Hoffmann (1930)

=== American Designers' Gallery ===
The American Designers' Gallery, established in the fall of 1928, included the Hoffmanns and Urban, ceramist Henry Varnum Poor, architect Raymond Hood, artist designer Winold Reiss, graphic designer Lucien Bernhard, decorator Donald Deskey, and architect Ely Jacques Kahn. The space was "devoted exclusively to showing objects and interiors for practical use... by fourteen American architects and designers". The Hoffmanns' works were featured in the expositions of the Gallery in 1928 and 1929. The 1929 exhibition featured Wolfgang's bench, dinette table and two chairs in American walnut, and Pola's rug. Design historian Marilyn F. Friedman wrote that the exhibition catalog promised "a coherent vision of modern design... from forms developed in [Europe]... characterized by affordability, simplicity and practicality, as well as appropriateness for use in traditional interiors as well as modern ones". The Hoffmanns also collaborated with Lucian Bernhard's Contempora gallery and decorating service.

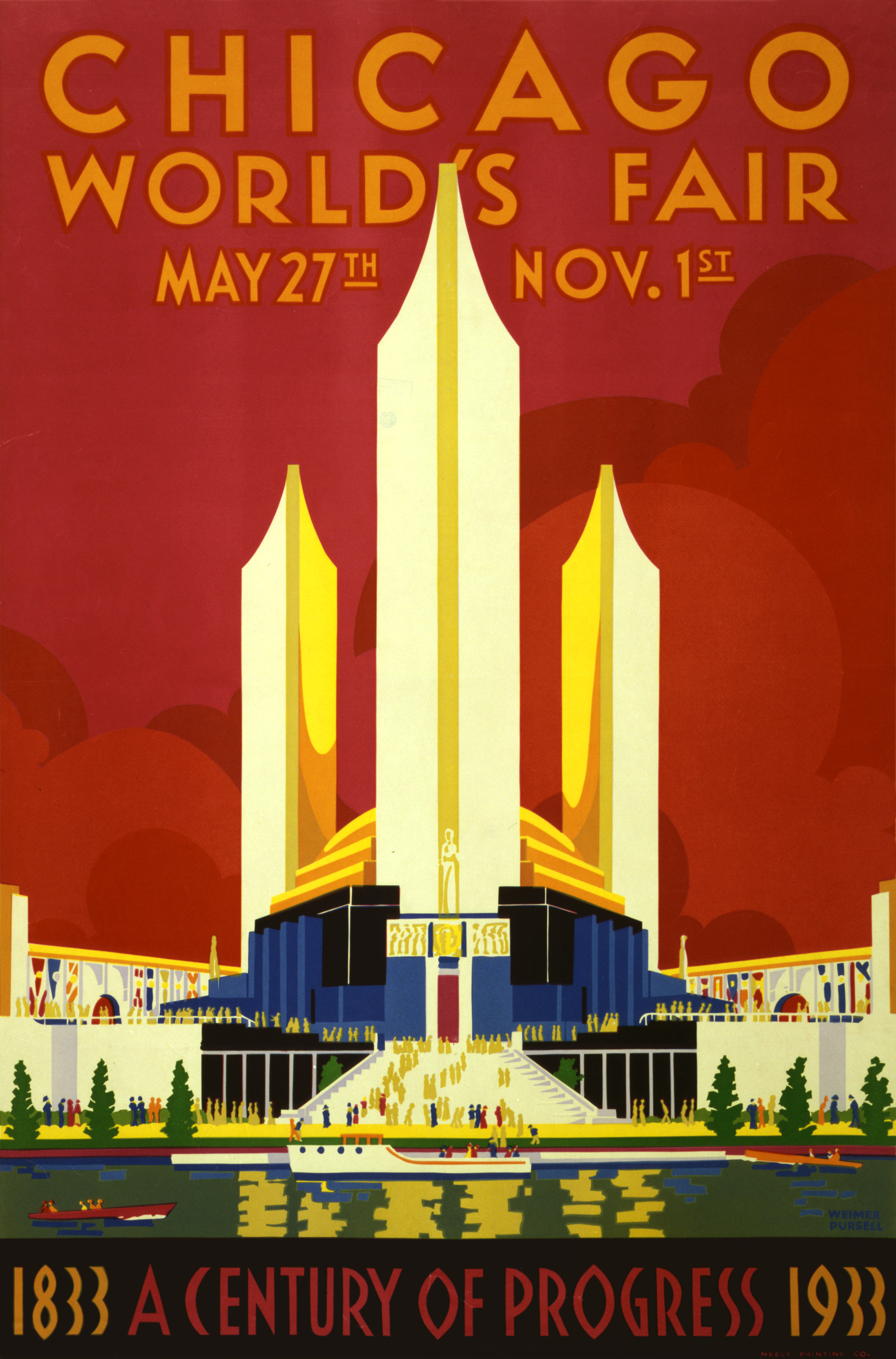
A Century of Progress poster

In 1931, Wolfgang's work was exhibited at New York's Museum of Modern Art. The same year he and Kem Weber organized an exhibition titled Modern Industrial and Decorative Arts at the Brooklyn Museum, a show that included work by both Wolfgang and Pola Hoffmann.

The Hoffmanns divorced in 1932, and dissolved their business partnership. Pola married writer Rex Stout and moved to Danbury, Connecticut.

=== Chicago World's Fair ===
In 1932 Hoffmann was asked to assist Urban in developing the "Rainbow City" color scheme for the 1933–1934 Chicago World's Fair, A Century of Progress.

He also designed the interiors and furniture for the fair's Lumber Industries house which included suites for a living room, dining room, master bedroom and guest room. The exhibition's eight-page booklet The Sunlight House, Interiors Designed by Wolfgang Hoffmann described and pictured innovative features such as an expanding dinner table, combination desk-bookcase, and chairs designed to comfortably accommodate different body types, as well as a list of the five manufacturers who collaborated with Hoffmann.

In 1934, Donald Deskey asked Hoffmann to design birchwood furniture for Helena Rubinstein's Park Avenue apartment.

== "Chromsteel" ==
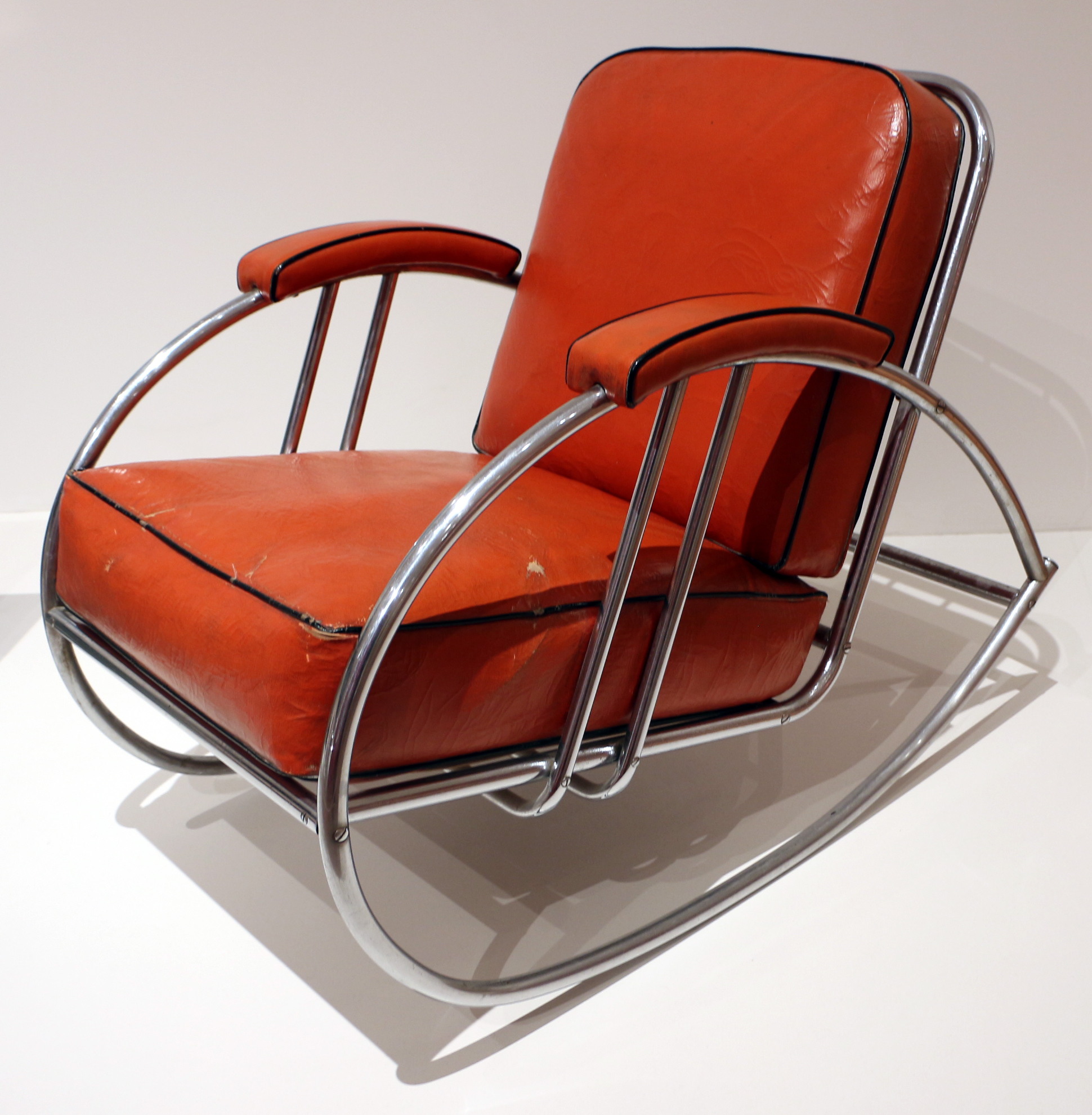
A Hoffmann design for W. H. Howell

Hoffmann moved to Illinois when the W. H. Howell Company of Geneva, Illinois (later of St. Charles, also in the Tri-City) hired him in 1934. Between 1934 and 1942 he created a large number of furniture designs in "Chromsteel". Howell's 1938 sales catalogue featured a photo of Hoffmann, captioned:

Mr. Wolfgang Hoffmann, internationally recognized as an authority in the development of authentic modern furniture ... designs for Howell exclusively.

Hoffmann's designs featured tubular or flat chromium-plated steel, which he incorporated into chairs, desks and tables to provide a "fluid and graceful appearance."

Hoffmann left the company in 1942 when it converted to war production. He became a professional photographer in Chicago.

== Photographer ==
Hoffmann and his second wife Ann, living in the Tri-City community of Batavia, opened an up-to-date photography studio in the Unity Building in Geneva, Illinois, on October 1, 1944. The business continued for nearly 25 years, with Hoffmann working as a commercial and industrial photographer and as staff photographer for Community Hospital in Geneva.

== Death ==
Though ailing for several months, Hoffmann continued working almost up until his death at Community Hospital in Geneva, Illinois, on February 16, 1969. A requiem mass was said for him at St. Peter's Catholic Church on February 24.
