= Winfield Township, Illinois =

Winfield Township
- Township
- Flag Logo

- Location in DuPage County

- DuPage County's location in Illinois
- Coordinates: 41°51′23″N 88°12′15″W
- Country: United States
- State: Illinois
- County: DuPage
- Settled: November 6, 1849

Government
  - Type: Illinois Township
  - Supervisor: Nicole Prater

Area
  - Total: 36.14 sq mi (93.6 km^{2})
  - Land: 34.77 sq mi (90.1 km^{2})
  - Water: 1.36 sq mi (3.5 km^{2}) 3.77%
- Elevation: 709 ft (216 m)

Population (2020)
  - Total: 45,836
  - Density: 1,318/sq mi (509.0/km^{2})
- Time zone: UTC-6 (CST)
  - Summer (DST): UTC-5 (CDT)
- ZIP codes: 60185, 60187, 60190, 60504, 60510, 60555, 60563
- FIPS code: 17-043-82413
- Website: winfieldtownship.com

Winfield Township is one of nine townships in DuPage County, Illinois, United States. As of the 2020 census, its population was 45,836 and it contained 16,445 housing units. It is the least populous township in DuPage County.

== Geography ==
According to the 2021 census gazetteer files, Winfield Township has a total area of 36.14 square miles (93.60 km^{2}), of which 34.77 square miles (90.05 km^{2}) (96.23%) is land and 1.36 square miles (3.52 km^{2}) (3.77%) is water.

=== Cities, towns, villages ===
- Aurora (northeast edge)
- Batavia (partial)
- Naperville (partial)
- Warrenville (northwest three-quarters)
- West Chicago (partial)
- Wheaton (partial)
- Winfield (partial)

=== Unincorporated towns ===
- Geneva Road at 41.888084°N 88.151459°W
- High Lake at 41.882206°N 88.184772°W
- Northwoods at 41.898979°N 88.166695°W
- Warrenhurst at 41.822807°N 88.214237°W

(This list is based on USGS data and may include former settlements.)

=== Ghost town ===
- Weston at 41.844825°N 88.2235°W

=== Adjoining townships ===
- Wayne Township (north)
- Bloomingdale Township (northeast)
- Milton Township (east)
- Lisle Township (southeast)
- Naperville Township (south)
- Aurora Township, Kane County (southwest)
- Geneva Township, Kane County (west)
- Batavia Township, Kane County (west)
- St. Charles Township, Kane County (northwest)

=== Cemeteries ===
The township contains these seven cemeteries: Assumption, Big Woods, Calvary, Glen Oak, Oakwood, Pioneer, and Warrenville.

=== Major highways ===
- Illinois Route 38
- Illinois Route 56
- Illinois Route 59

=== Airports and landing strips ===
- Central DuPage Heliport
- DuPage Airport (south quarter)

=== Lakes ===
- High Lake
- Lake Law
- Loveless Lake
- Silver Lake
- Spring Lake
- Timber Lake

=== Landmarks ===
- Kline Creek Farm (DuPage County Forest Preserve)
- Roy C. Blackwell Forest Preserve
- Fermi National Accelerator Laboratory (western portion)
- Illinois Youth Center Warrenville (northern portion)

== Demographics ==
Historical population
Census	Pop.	Note	%±
1930	6,077		—
1940	6,857		12.8%
1950	9,561		39.4%
1960	16,437		71.9%
1970	23,001		39.9%
1980	28,940		25.8%
1990	37,969		31.2%
2000	45,155		18.9%
2010	46,233		2.4%
2020	45,836		−0.9%
U.S. Decennial Census

As of the 2020 census, there were 45,836 people, 15,540 households, and 10,979 families residing in the township. The population density was 1,268.40 inhabitants per square mile (489.73/km^{2}). There were 16,445 housing units at an average density of 455.07 per square mile (175.70/km^{2}). The racial makeup of the township was 57.26% White, 2.62% African American, 1.60% Native American, 3.79% Asian, 0.02% Pacific Islander, 19.94% from other races, and 14.76% from two or more races. Hispanic or Latino of any race were 38.18% of the population.

== Education ==
- Community High School District 94
- Winfield Elementary School District 34
- West Chicago Elementary School District 33
- Community Unit School District 200
- Indian Prairie Community Unit School District 204

== Political districts ==
- Illinois's 14th congressional district
- Illinois's 6th congressional district
- State House District 95
- State House District 96
- State Senate District 48

== Notable people ==
- Donald Hensel (1926–2012), Illinois state representative; born in Winfield Township.
