= North Geneva Historic District =

Historic district in Illinois, United States

- U.S. National Register of Historic Places
- U.S. Historic district
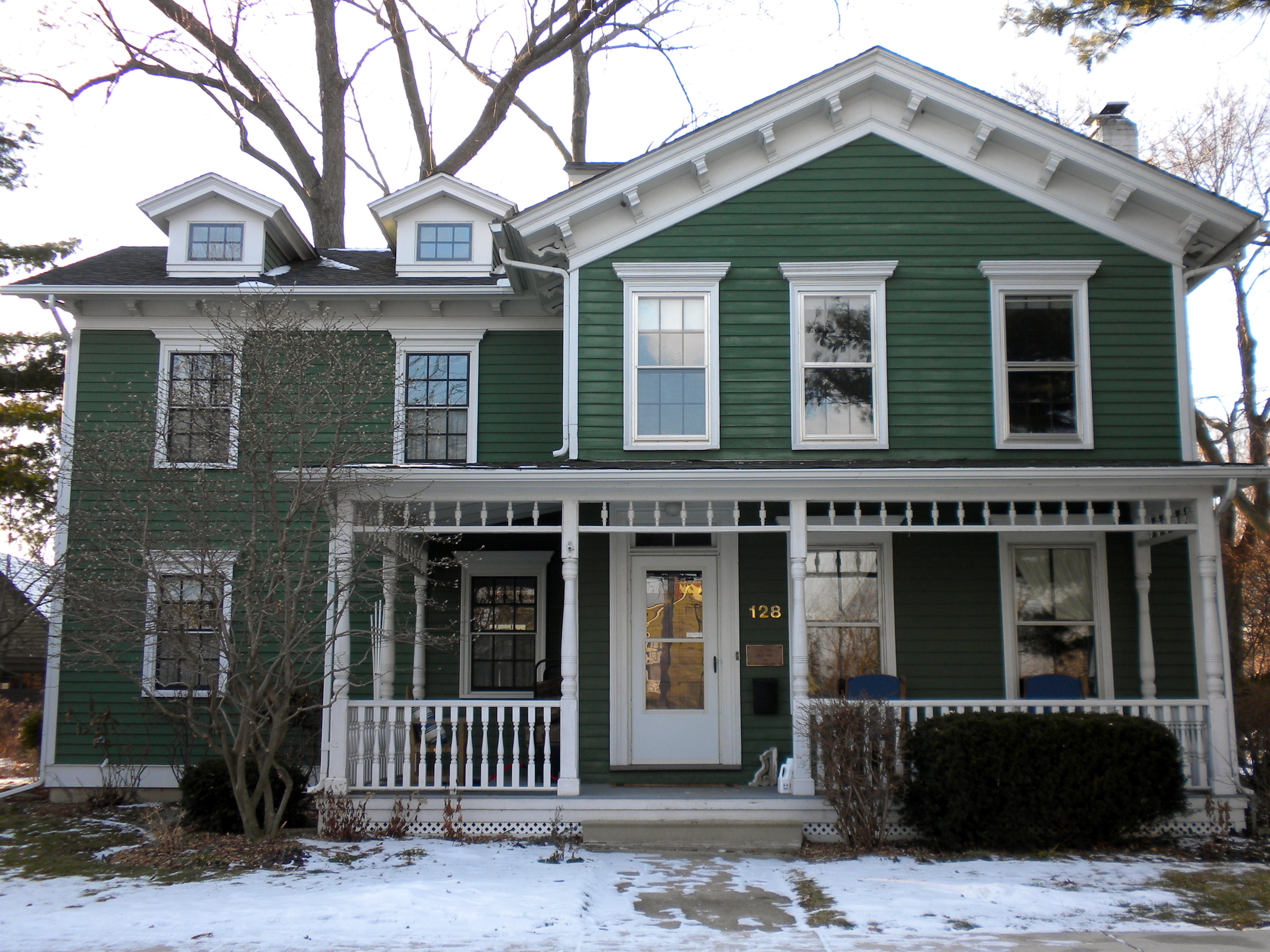
- A house in the North Geneva Historic District

- Location within Illinois Location within the United States
- Location: Roughly bounded by railroad tracks, Fox River, Stevens and W. State Sts., Geneva, Illinois
- Coordinates: 41°53′23″N 88°18′30″W
- Area: 72 acres (29 ha)
- Architectural style: Greek Revival, Italianate, Prairie School
- NRHP reference No.: 82002549 (original); 16000898 (increase)

Significant dates
- Added to NRHP: August 1, 1979
- Boundary increase: July 10, 2017

The North Geneva Historic District is a set of 161 buildings and structures in Geneva, Illinois. Of those, 150 contribute to the district's historical integrity. The district was added to the National Register of Historic Places in 1979, and was slightly enlarged in 2017.

== History ==
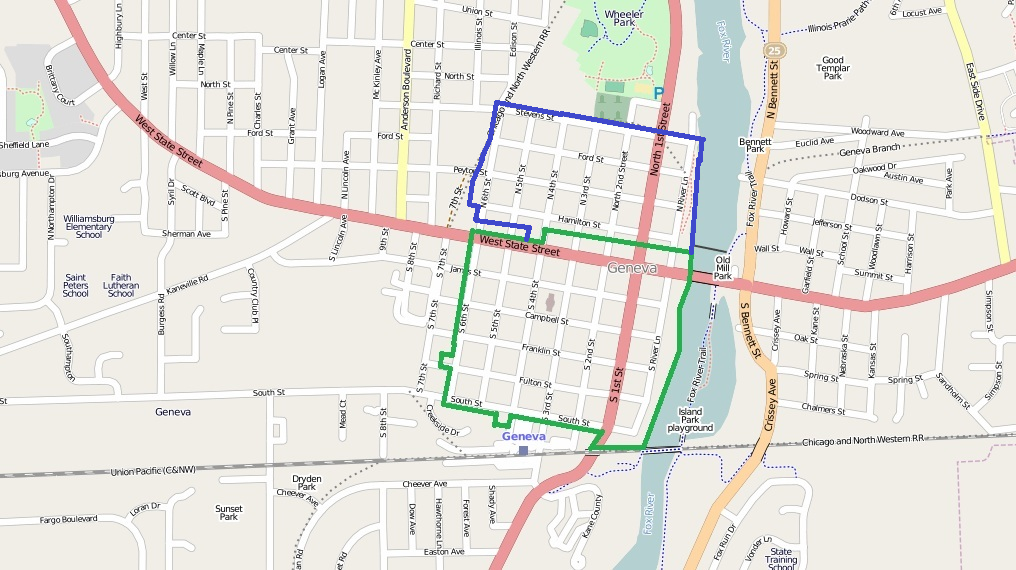
Location of the North Geneva Historic District (blue outline) within Geneva. The adjacent Central Geneva Historic District is outlined in green to the south, partially sharing a border north of W. State St.

The North Geneva Historic District reflects the northern portion of the original settlement, which was home to many prominent early Geneva businessmen as well as the working class. It consists of the area known as the First Ward, roughly bounded by Stevens Street, the (modern day) Union Pacific Railroad on the west, W. State Street to the south, and the Fox River to the east. The west and east sides of the district exhibit architectural similarities. The district is representative of the socioeconomic status of the original settlers. The First Ward was platted in a gridiron pattern with blocks of 300 square feet (28 m^{2}), divided into ten lots of 60 by 100 feet (18 m × 30 m). Lots along the Fox River differ in shape and size. Working-class homes are moderately-sized and stylistically conservative. Most are of frame construction. Oscar and August Wilson were among the more prominent local architects, who admired Frank Lloyd Wright and incorporated Prairie School elements into their otherwise vernacular buildings. 62 of the 150 notable structures are considered to have particular historical or architectural significance. Three of Geneva's first five churches are located in the district. The district was added to the National Register of Historic Places on August 1, 1979.

== Notable properties ==
The nomination form for the historic district singles out several properties that are particularly representative of mid- to late- 19th century architectural styles.

- Hubbard–Wrate House, built c. 1848, Italianate
- DeGrout House, built c. 1856, Greek Revival
- 202 N. Fourth Street, built c. 1915, residence for August Wilson, Prairie School
- 228 N. Fourth Street, built c. 1916, residence for Oscar Wilson, Prairie School
- United Methodist Church, built 1874 (tower completed 1893), Romanesque Revival
- Westgrath–Crary House, built 1849, built with riverstone
