= Winfield S. Hall =

American physiologist and writer

Winfield Scott Hall
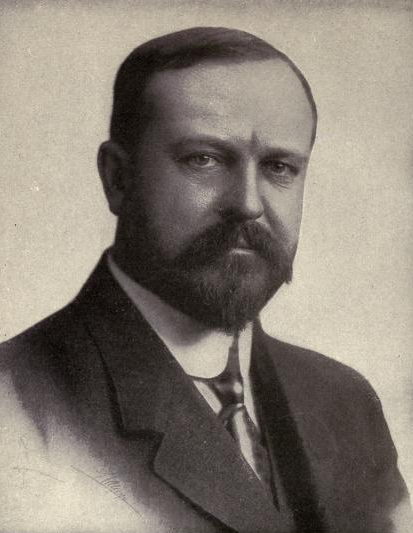
- Born: January 5, 1861; Batavia, Illinois, U.S.
- Died: October 2, 1942 (aged 81); Berwyn, Illinois, U.S.
- Occupations: Physiologist, writer

Signature
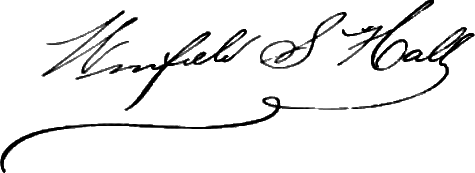

Winfield Scott Hall (January 5, 1861 – October 2, 1942) was an American physiologist and writer.

== Career ==
Hall was born in Batavia, Illinois. He attended Northwestern University where he obtained his B.S. in 1887, M.D. in 1888 and M.S. in 1889. He studied physiology at Leipzig University where he obtained his PhD in 1895.

Hall was instructor in biology at Haverford College (1889–1893) and Professor of Physiology at Northwestern University Medical School (1895–1919). He was a member of the American Physiological Society, Chairman of the American Medical Association in 1905 and President of the American Academy of Medicine from 1902 to 1910.

Hall authored works on dietetics, physiology and sex hygiene. He was described as a pioneer in the field of sex education. In 1911, it was reported that Hall had visited 51 educational institutions to teach sex education. He married Jeannette Winter in 1888, they had four children.

== Anti-smoking ==
Hall was a smoker for many years but gave it up, criticized smoking as a drug habit and warned the public about its health dangers. Hall was cited by Henry Ford in his anti-smoking book The Case Against the Little White Slaver, published in 1914.

== Selected publications ==
- A Laboratory Guide in Physiology (1897)
- A Textbook of Physiology (1899)
- The Cigarette: Why It is Especially Objectionable (1900)
- What Is A Food? (1900)
- Nutrition and Dietetics (1910)
- The Biology, Physiology and Sociology of Reproduction (1911)
- Sex Training in the Home (1914)
- Sexual Knowledge (1916)
