= Donald Hensel =

American politician

Donald N. Hensel (October 20, 1926 – February 26, 2012) was an American politician.

Hensel was born in Winfield Township, DuPage County, Illinois. He served in the United States Air Force during World War II and the Korean War. Hensel went to Cornell College in Iowa. He worked at the United States Post Office in West Chicago, Illinois. Hensel was also in the aluminium business in purchasing and inventory control. Hensel served as a Winfield Township trustee from 1973 to 1977 and as the Winfield Township clerk from 1977 to 1985. Hensel served in the Illinois House of Representatives from 1983 to 1993 and was a Republican. Hensel also served as a director of the Illinois International Port District. Hensel died in Winfield, Illinois. Hensel's death was honored with a resolution from the Illinois General Assembly for whom he had served.
