= Batavia Township, Illinois =

Batavia Township
- Township
- Location in Kane County

- Kane County's location in Illinois
- Coordinates: 41°49′59″N 088°18′59″W
- Country: United States
- State: Illinois
- County: Kane
- Established: November 6, 1849

Area
  - Total: 18.69 sq mi (48.4 km^{2})
  - Land: 18.30 sq mi (47.4 km^{2})
  - Water: 0.39 sq mi (1.0 km^{2}) 2.08%
- Elevation: 692 ft (211 m)

Population (2020)
  - Total: 35,363
  - Density: 1,932/sq mi (746.1/km^{2})
- FIPS code: 17-089-04091
- GNIS feature ID: 0428640
- Website: www.bataviatownship.com

Batavia Township is in Kane County, Illinois. It is divided by the Fox River. As of the 2020 census, its population was 35,363 and it contained 13,446 housing units. The western part of the United States Department of Energy's Fermilab is at the township's eastern edge (formerly in the village of Weston), although most of the facility is in neighboring Winfield Township in DuPage County.

== Geography ==
Unlike the prototypical Midwestern township, which is a six mile by six mile square, Batavia splits such a 6-mile (9.7 km) square with Geneva Township. According to the 2021 census gazetteer files, Batavia Township has a total area of 18.69 square miles (48.41 km^{2}), of which 18.30 square miles (47.40 km^{2}) (or 97.92%) is land and 0.39 square miles (1.01 km^{2}) (or 2.08%) is water.

=== Cities and towns ===
- Aurora (small part)
- Batavia (vast majority)
- North Aurora (northern half)

=== Unincorporated towns ===
- Mooseheart at 41.82407°N 88.33467°W
- Woodland Hills at 41.849472°N 88.281464°W

=== Adjacent townships ===
- Geneva Township (north)
- Winfield Township (east)
- Blackberry Township (west)
- Aurora Township (south)
- Naperville Township (southeast)
- Sugar Grove Township (southwest)

=== School districts ===
- Batavia Public School District 101
- West Aurora Public School District 129

=== Cemeteries ===
The township contains Westside, Eastside, and River Hills cemeteries.

=== Major highways ===
- Illinois State Route 56
- Illinois State Route 31
- Illinois State Route 25

== Demographics ==
As of the 2020 census there were 35,363 people, 12,993 households, and 9,739 families residing in the township. The population density was 1,892.28 inhabitants per square mile (730.61/km^{2}). There were 13,446 housing units at an average density of 719.50 per square mile (277.80/km^{2}). The racial makeup of the township was 79.81% White, 3.83% African American, 0.36% Native American, 3.30% Asian, 0.02% Pacific Islander, 4.30% from other races, and 8.38% from two or more races. Hispanic or Latino of any race were 11.63% of the population.

There were 12,993 households, out of which 35.80% had children under the age of 18 living with them, 65.53% were married couples living together, 7.83% had a female householder with no spouse present, and 25.04% were non-families. 19.80% of all households were made up of individuals, and 8.50% had someone living alone who was 65 years of age or older. The average household size was 2.74 and the average family size was 3.22.

The township's age distribution consisted of 25.0% under the age of 18, 5.9% from 18 to 24, 25.2% from 25 to 44, 31.3% from 45 to 64, and 12.6% who were 65 years of age or older. The median age was 40.1 years. For every 100 females, there were 94.1 males. For every 100 females age 18 and over, there were 95.5 males.

The median income for a household in the township was $105,642, and the median income for a family was $122,162. Males had a median income of $69,215 versus $40,888 for females. The per capita income for the township was $45,955. About 3.0% of families and 5.2% of the population were below the poverty line, including 7.7% of those under age 18 and 5.8% of those age 65 or over.

Historical population
Census	Pop.	Note	%±
2000	30,137		—
2010	35,221		16.9%
2020	35,363		0.4%
U.S. Decennial Census
