= Batavia Depot Museum =

Train Museum in Illinois, United States

Batavia
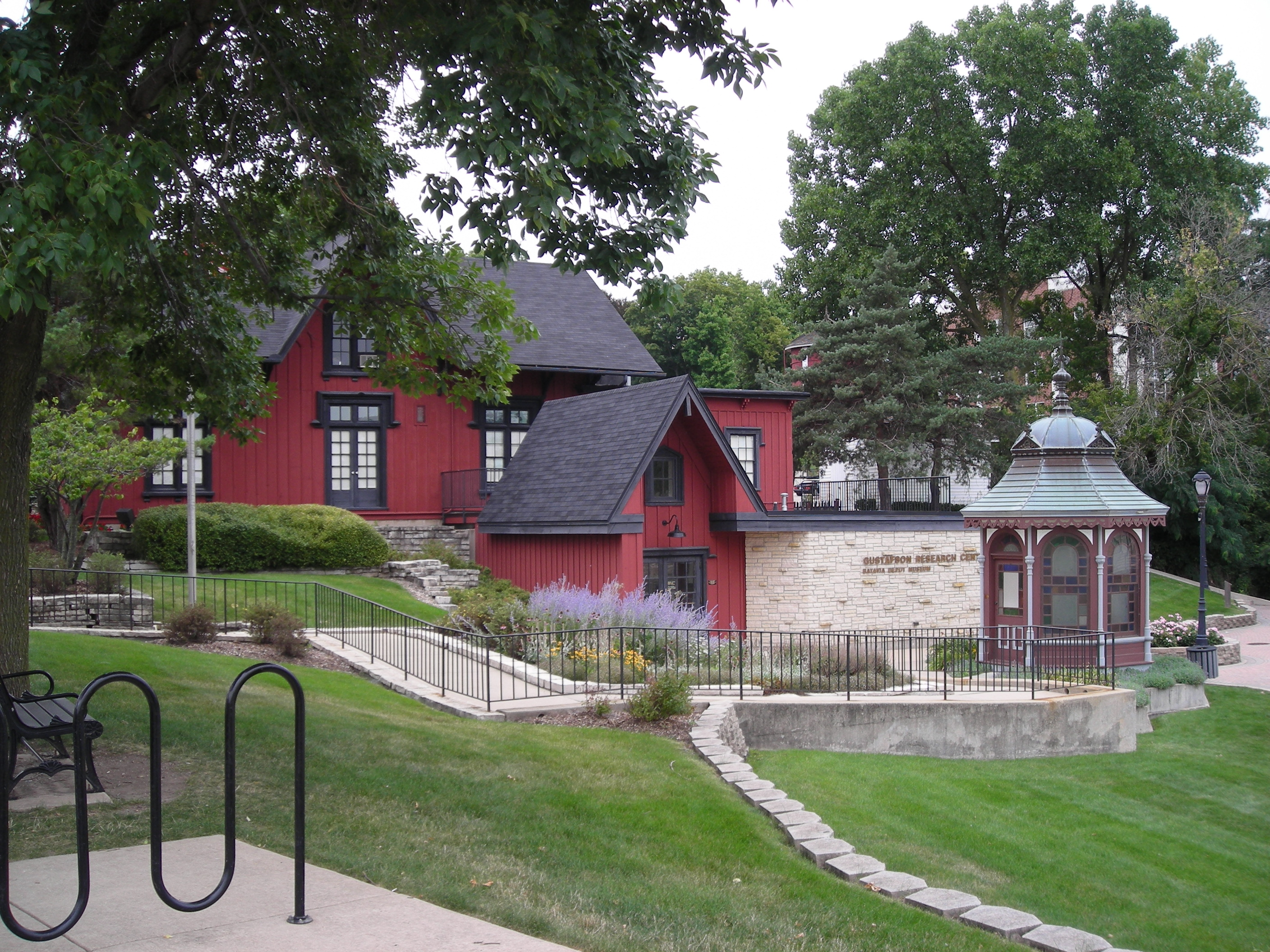
- Batavia station in August 2007.

General information
- Location: 155 Houston Street, Batavia, Illinois 60510
- System: Former Burlington Route passenger station

History
- Opened: 1854
- Chicago, Burlington, and Quincy Railroad Depot
- U.S. National Register of Historic Places
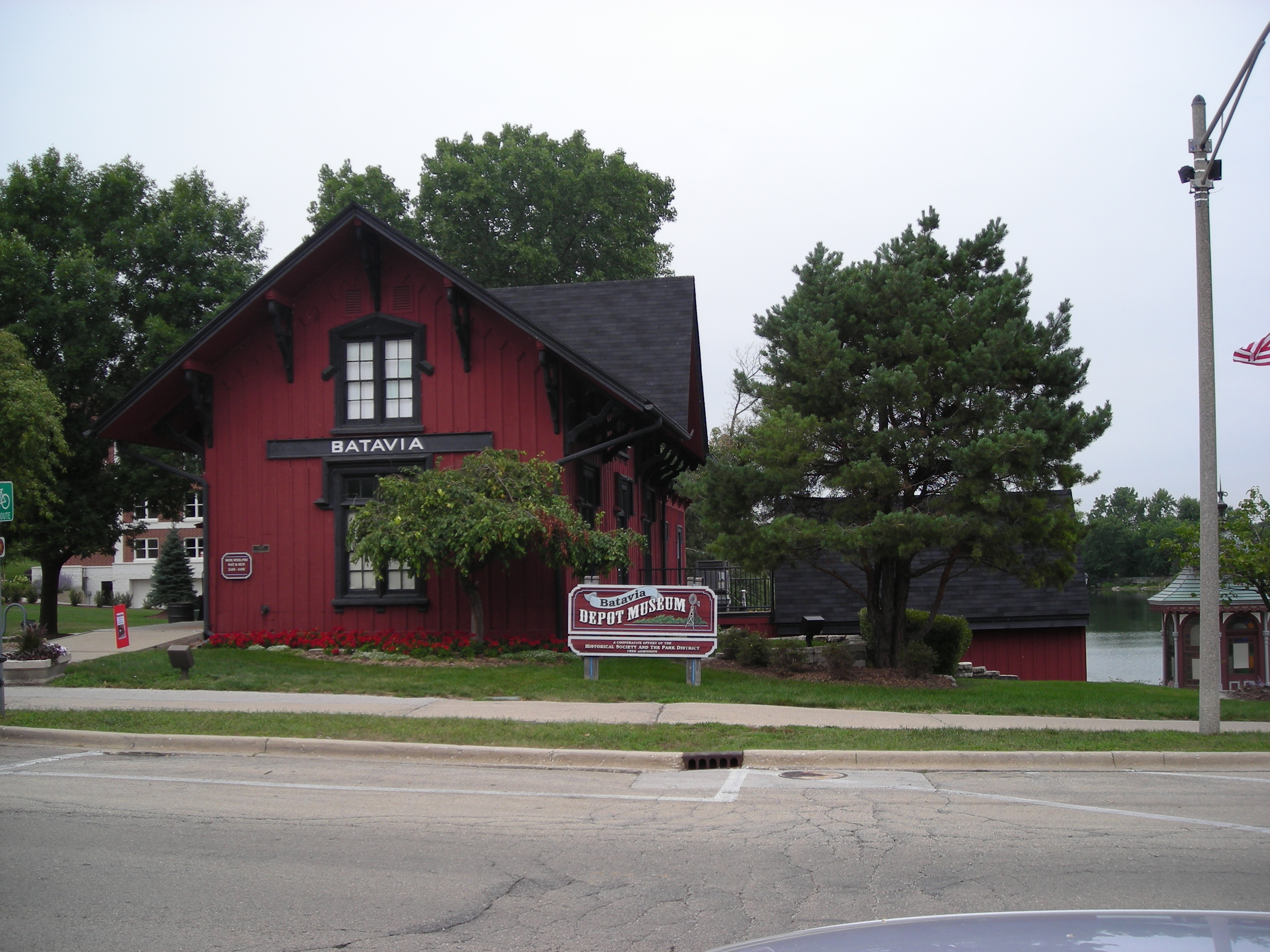

- Location within Chicago metropolitan area Location within Illinois Location within the United States
- Location: Batavia, Kane County, Illinois, United States
- Coordinates: 41°51′5.22″N 88°18′37.43″W
- Built: 1854
- Architectural style: Gothic Revival
- NRHP reference No.: 79000842
- Added to NRHP: June 6, 1979
Location

The Batavia Depot Museum is a museum in Batavia, Illinois that was once the town's primary train station. It was the first of many depots built by the Chicago, Burlington and Quincy Railroad. It was listed on the National Register of Historic Places in 1979 as the Chicago, Burlington, and Quincy Railroad Depot.

== History ==
The Chicago, Burlington, and Quincy Railroad (CB&Q) was established in the 1850s to rival the Galena and Chicago Union Railroad (C&GU). The new railroad was constructed due to growing concern that the cities of Batavia and Aurora would have an economic downfall since the C&GU bypassed both settlements. The railroad station in Batavia was the first constructed by the CB&Q, and as such, the company took extra care to make it stand out architecturally.

The wood structure stands two stories tall with red, vertical panels. Originally 22 by 45 feet (6.7 by 13.7 m), a four-room extension was added to the ground floor in 1868. The main structure has a gable roof with Gothic brackets while the extension has a flat roof. The station was later abandoned by the CB&Q, who preferred to maintain only a direct route through Aurora. The station was moved to its current location in 1973 in an effort to preserve it. Renovations were made to restore the building to its 1919 appearance (which was likely very similar to the original). The building was placed on a new cinder block foundation. The new lot also had a basement for a furnace to keep the building open during the winter. The Fox River now lies to the building's east. The building was listed on the National Register of Historic Places on June 6, 1979.

== Notes ==
Preceding station	Burlington Route	Following station
North Aurora toward Aurora	Aurora – West Chicago	West Chicago Terminus
