= Batavia Institute =

- U.S. National Register of Historic Places
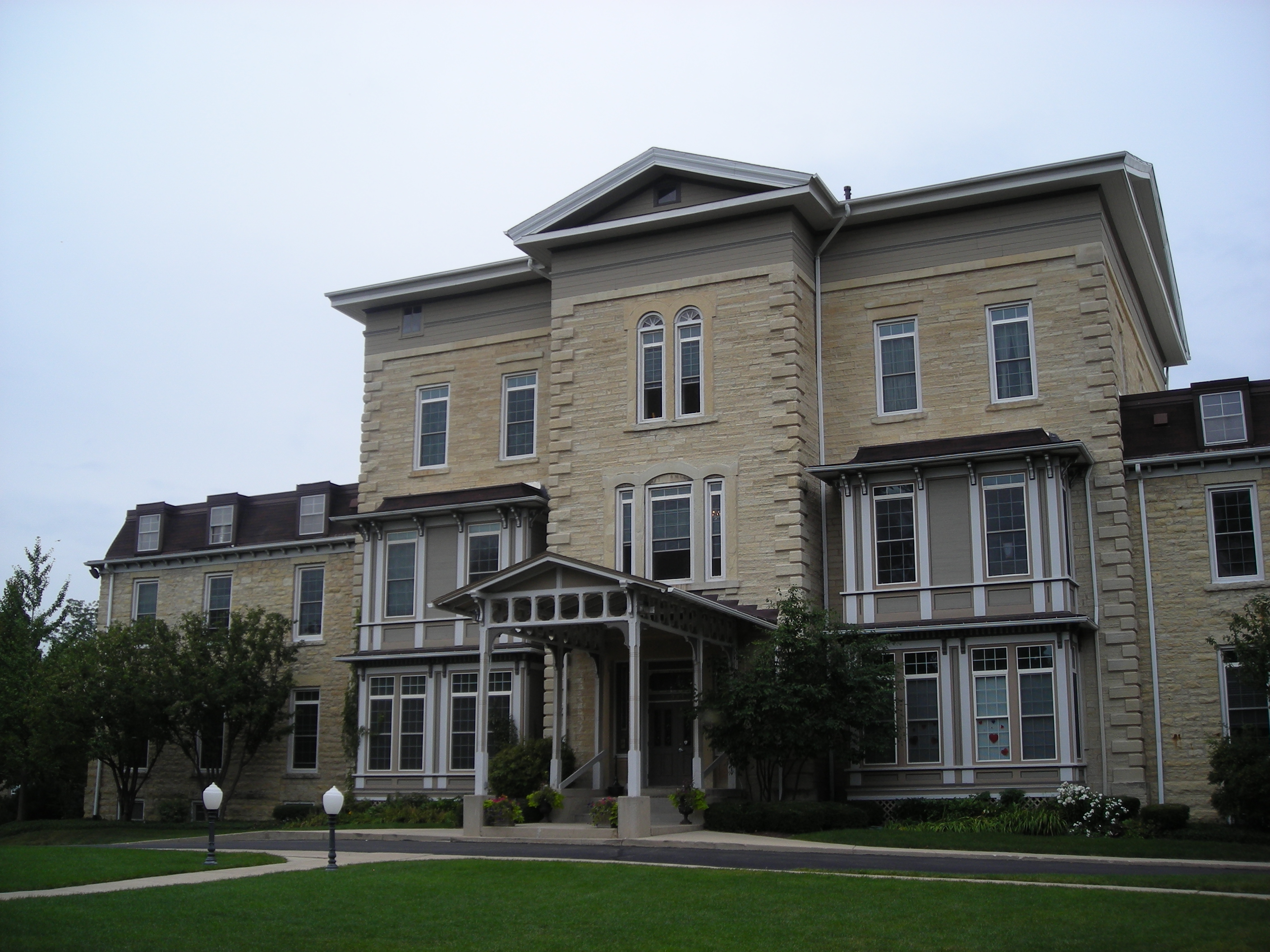
- Location: Batavia, Kane County, Illinois, United States
- Coordinates: 41°50′40.49″N 88°18′58.6″W
- Built: 1853
- Architect: Town, Elijah Shumway
- Architectural style: Greek Revival
- NRHP reference No.: 76000712
- Added to NRHP: August 13, 1976

The Batavia Institute (currently recognized name) also known as Bellevue Place Sanitarium is a Registered Historic Place in Batavia, Illinois, US.

== Batavia Institute ==
Batavia Institute, a private academy, was chartered on February 12, 1853 by 13 men, including Rev. Stephen Peet, the Congregational minister, Elijah Shumway Town, Joel McKee, John Van Nortwick, Dennison K. Town, who settled in Batavia in 1839 as its first physician, and Isaac G. Wilson.

The original building, which still stands in Batavia at 333 South Jefferson Street, at Union Avenue, was constructed in 1853–1854 of locally quarried limestone at a cost of $20,000 (equivalent to $774,000 in 2025). The architect Elijah Shumway Town designed the building in a Greek Revival style.

=== Mary Todd Lincoln ===
In 1875, ten years following the death of Abraham Lincoln, the 16th President of the United States, Mary Todd Lincoln was committed to Bellevue Place Sanitarium, formerly known as the Batavia Institute. A Chicago court deemed that Mrs. Lincoln behaved "irrationally" and ordered her to be placed in a mental hospital. Mrs. Lincoln stayed for less than four months at the Bellevue Place prior to being released to her sister, Elizabeth where she assumed her care in Springfield.

== Today ==
In the 1960s, the building was converted to a residential facility for unwed mothers named the 'Fox Hill Home', which operated until the 1970s. In the mid 80s, the building was once again named Bellevue Place and converted into apartments which are lived in as of today. The building is not publicly accessible.

The building was listed in the National Register of Historic Places on August 13, 1976.
