= Vernacular geography =

Common linguistic sense of place

Vernacular geography is the sense of place that is revealed in ordinary people's language. Current research by the Ordnance Survey is attempting to understand the landmarks, streets, open spaces, water bodies, landforms, fields, woods, and many other topological features. These commonly used descriptive terms do not necessarily use the official or current names for features; and often these concepts of places don't have clear, rigid boundaries. For example, sometimes the same name may refer to more than one feature, and sometimes people in a locality use more than one name for the same feature. When people refer to geographical regions in a vernacular form they are commonly referred to as imprecise regions. Regions can include large areas of a country such as the American Midwest, the British Midlands, the Swiss Alps, the south east of England and southern California; or smaller areas such as Silicon Valley in northern California. Commonly used descriptions of areas of cities such as a city's downtown district, New York's Upper East Side, London's square mile or the Latin Quarter of Paris can also be viewed as imprecise regions.

== Vernacular region ==
Beyond "vernacular geography," a "vernacular region" is a distinctive area where the inhabitants collectively consider themselves interconnected by a shared history, mutual interests, and a common identity. Such regions are "intellectual inventions" and a form of shorthand to identify things, people, and places. Vernacular regions reflect a "sense of place," but rarely coincide with established jurisdictional borders.

Examples of vernacular regions in the United States include Tidewater, also known as Hampton Roads, Siouxland, and the Tri-City area of Batavia, Geneva, and St. Charles, Illinois. Another can be the American South, since it can be non-officially considered as the Confederate States of the U.S. Civil War, where the climate is warm and has limited snow, or by being below a certain latitude. Other vernacular regions include the DFW Metroplex, Southern California, the Tri-Cities of Tennessee, the Piedmont Triad, Metrolina and the Research Triangle of North Carolina, the High Desert and Inland Empire in California, the Emerald Coast and the Gold Coast of Florida, and the Twin Cities.

== Research ==
The World Wide Web is a major source of geographical information submitted by non-specialists. The British Ordnance Survey is sponsoring research at the Universities of Cardiff and Sheffield, the aim of which is to study the use of vernacular geography, and to investigate how information mined from the Web can be used to generate an approximate spatial boundary for an imprecise region. The existing technology for accessing geographical data is not well adapted to the unstructured, largely text-based resources of the Web. Spatial information on the Web can be categorized geographically according to the textual content, but a major problem for GIS developers wanting to use this resource is the vague and imprecise nature of place names that are commonly employed within web documents.

In pursuit of delineating vernacular regions, trigger phrases are used by researchers to capture regular linguistic patterns, which identify relationships between geographic locations. For example, the trigger phrase “X is located in Y” can be "Birmingham is located in *" or "* is located in Birmingham". The completed trigger phrase is then submitted to a search engine. For each search, up to 100 results are retrieved. Duplicate results are then removed based on the URL, and snippet text and the search result is used to find candidate region members.

From these results, geo-references are extracted and assigned spatial coordinates. A bounding box is then applied and the bounding box is used to find coordinates of other regions and points, apparently lying outside the candidate region. Thus it is possible to compute a boundary for the imprecise region using the points inside and outside.

=== Public participation tool ===
Cardiff University launched a web questionnaire together with mapping tools to capture people's perception of Vernacular Geography in Great Britain.
