= Central Geneva Historic District =

Historic district in Illinois, United States

- U.S. National Register of Historic Places
- U.S. Historic district
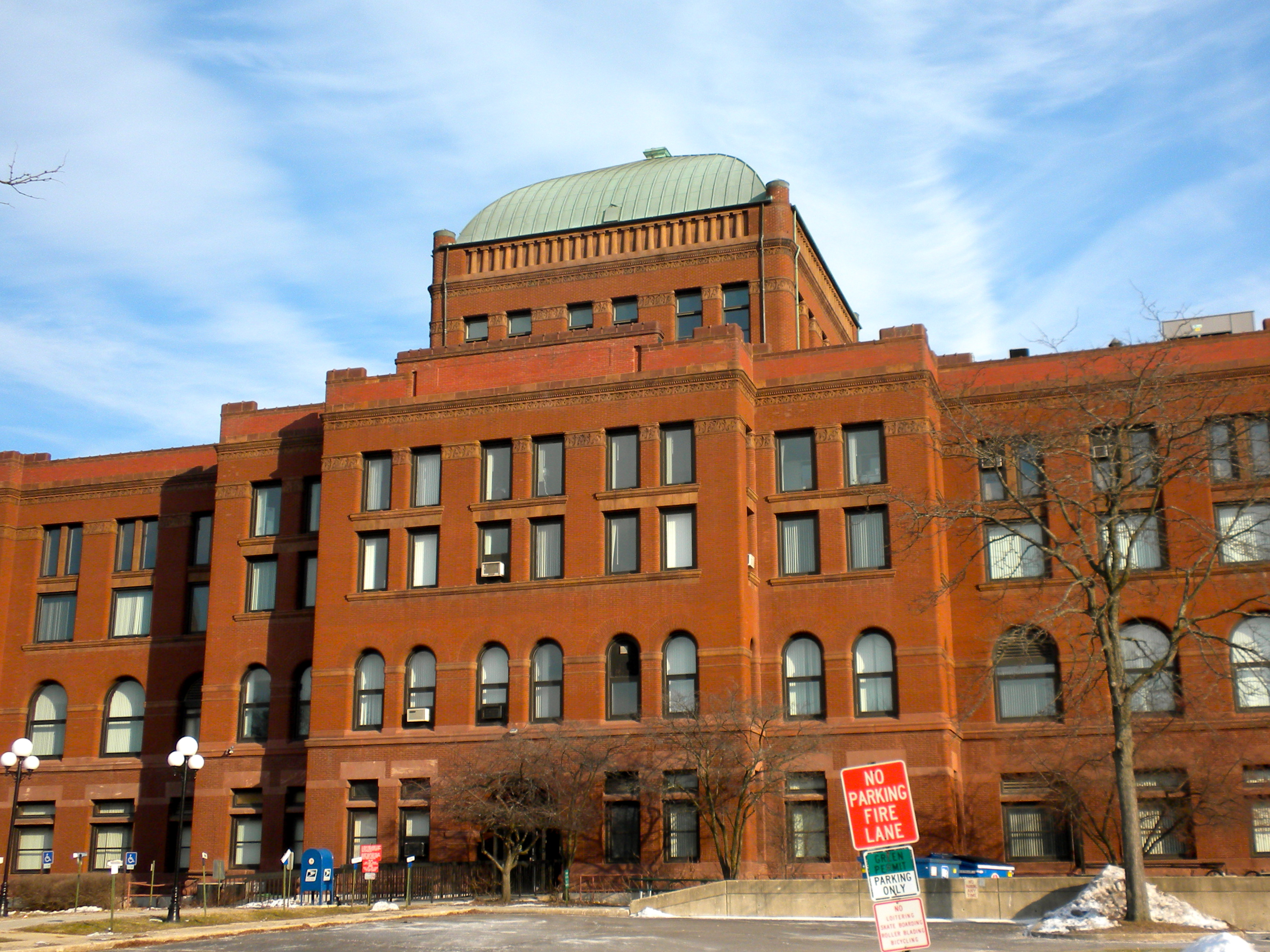
- Kane County Courthouse in the district

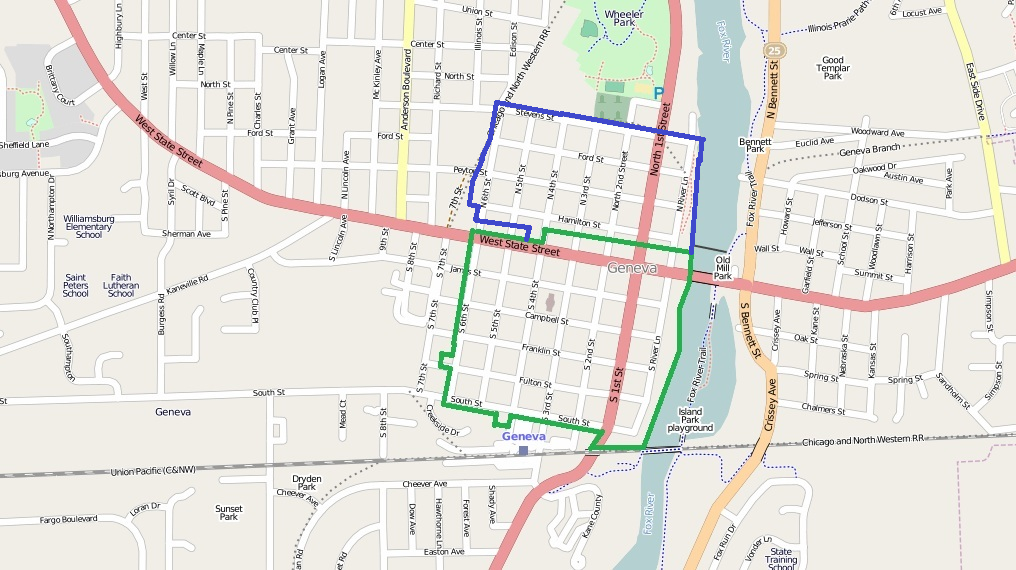
- Location of the Central Geneva Historic District (green outline) within Geneva. The adjacent North Geneva Historic District is outlined in blue to the north.
- Location: Roughly bounded by Fox River, South, 6th and W. State Sts., Geneva, Illinois
- Coordinates: 41°53′8″N 88°18′30″W
- Area: 67 acres (27 ha)
- Architectural style: Greek Revival, Italianate, Classical Revival
- NRHP reference No.: 79000845 (original); 16000897 (increase)

Significant dates
- Added to NRHP: September 10, 1979
- Boundary increase: July 10, 2017

The Central Geneva Historic District is a set of 102 buildings and structures in Geneva, Illinois. Of those, 68 contribute to the district's historical integrity. The district is representative of southern Geneva, south of Illinois Route 38. Among the noted buildings is the Kane County Courthouse and the Frank Lloyd Wright-designed P. D. Hoyt House. The district was added to the National Register of Historic Places in 1979, and was enlarged in 2017.

== History ==
The Central Geneva Historic District principally consists of land from the original platted settlement, now the southern half of the town. It is primarily residential, but does have a commercial sector lining W. State Street (Illinois Route 38). Among the public buildings are a public library, city hall, and county courthouse. The only other major road intersecting the district is S. First Street (Illinois Route 31). Most houses are two-story frame residences built between 1840 and 1900, principally from a vernacular style. Geneva's later identification as a scenic shopping area encouraged the city to invest in the restoration of several structures. The district was added to the National Register of Historic Places on September 10, 1979.

== Notable properties ==
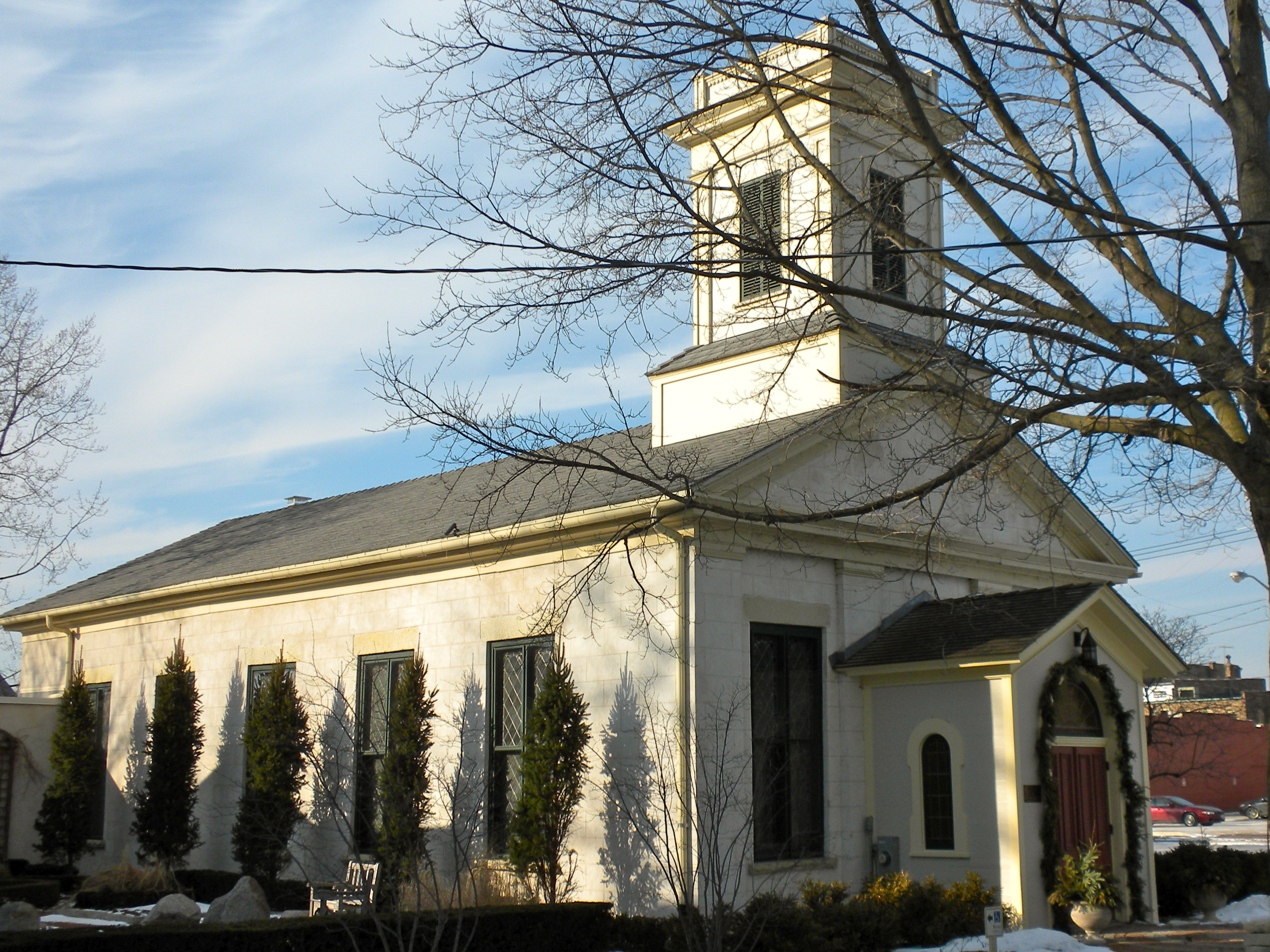
Geneva Unitarian Church, cited as an excellent example of Greek Revival architecture.

The nomination form for the historic district singles out several properties that are particularly representative of mid- to late- 19th century architectural styles

- Unitarian Church, built in 1843, Greek Revival
- Loveday House, built c. 1869, Gothic Revival
- Augustus Herrington House, built c. 1851, Italianate
- Moore House #2, built in 1864, Italianate
- Plato House, built in 1857, Italianate
- Charles B. Wells House, built in 1850, Neoclassical
- George Patten House, built in 1857, Federal Revival
- Isaac Wilson House #1, built c. 1852, Federal Revival
- P. D. Hoyt House, built in 1906, designed by Frank Lloyd Wright, Prairie School
- Eben Conant House, built c. 1844, vernacular
- Walter House, built c. 1855, vernacular
- Benjamin Wilson house, built c. 1848
