= Batavia, Illinois =

City in the United States

- City
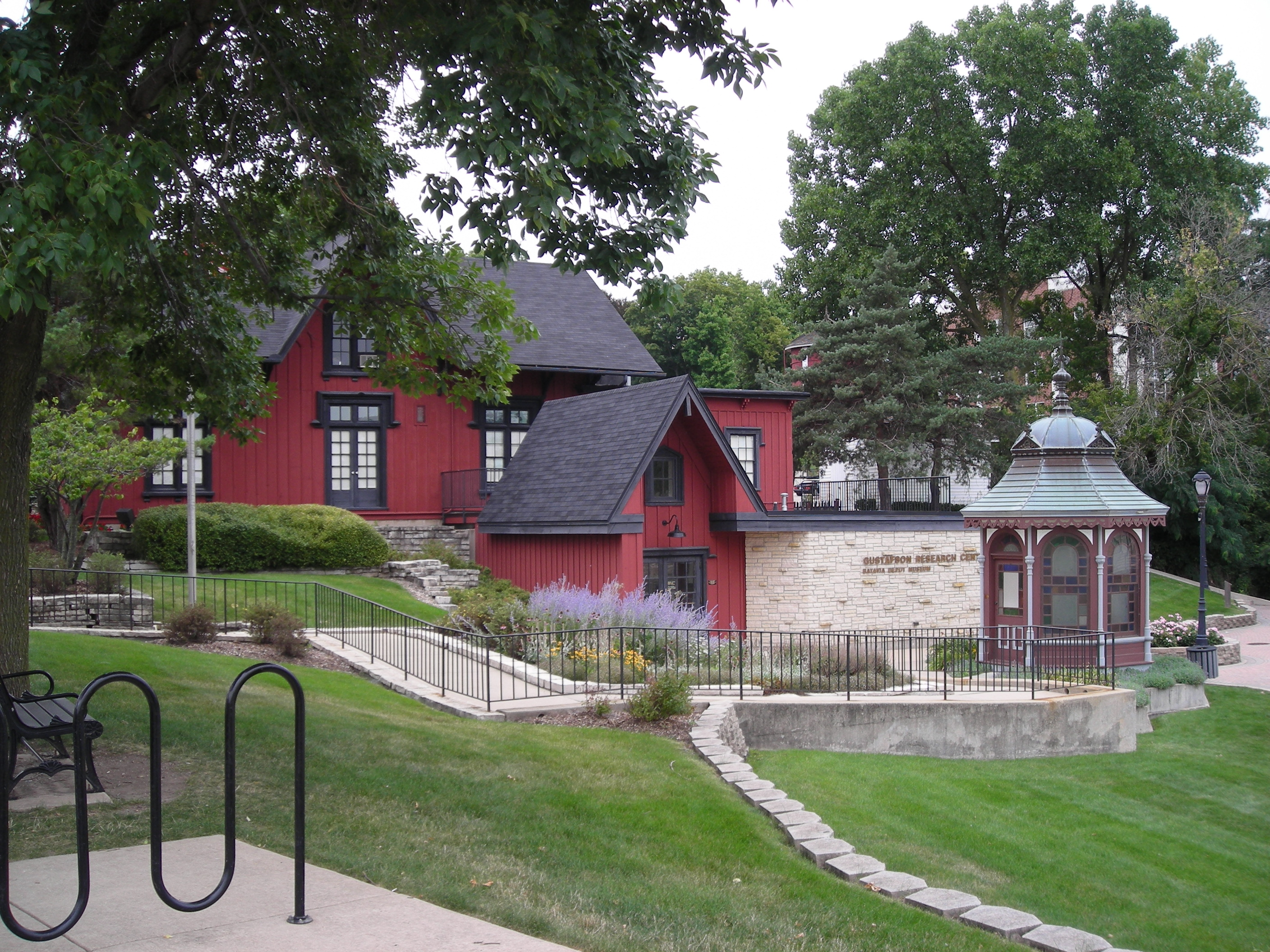
- Batavia Depot Museum

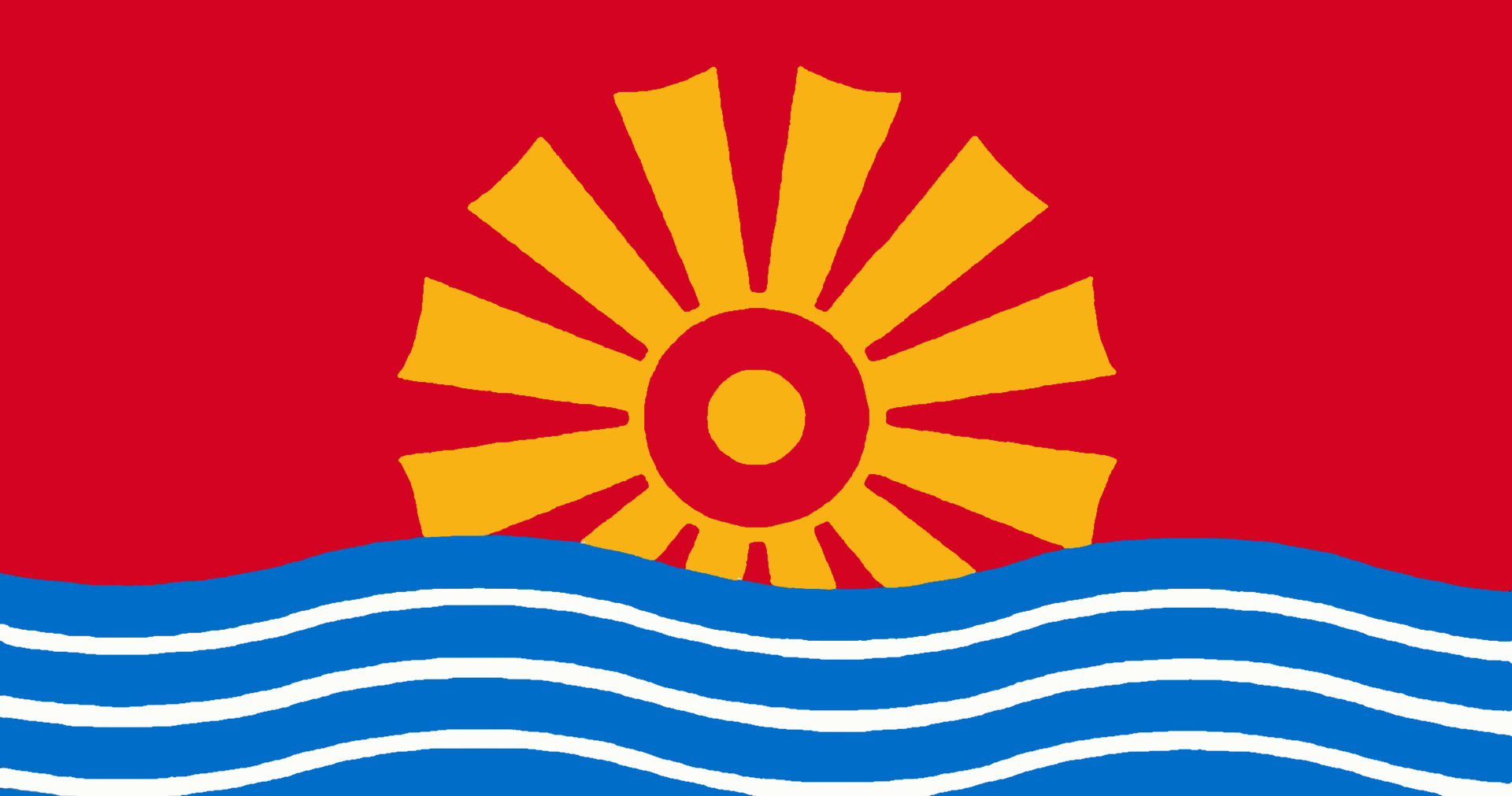
- Flag Logo
- Nicknames: The Windmill City, City of Energy
- Motto: "Where Tradition and Vision Meet"
- Location of Batavia in Kane and DuPage Counties within Illinois.
- Coordinates: 41°50′52″N 88°18′40″W
- Country: United States
- State: Illinois
- Counties: Kane, DuPage
- Townships: Aurora (Kane), Batavia (Kane), Blackberry (Kane), Geneva (Kane), Winfield (DuPage)
- Settled: 1833
- Incorporated: July 27, 1872

Government
  - Type: Council–manager

Area
  - Total: 10.83 sq mi (28.06 km^{2})
  - Land: 10.65 sq mi (27.58 km^{2})
  - Water: 0.19 sq mi (0.48 km^{2})
- Elevation: 715 ft (218 m)

Population (2020)
  - Total: 26,098
  - Density: 2,450.5/sq mi (946.15/km^{2})
- Time zone: UTC-6 (CST)
  - Summer (DST): UTC-5 (CDT)
- ZIP codes: 60510 and 60539
- Area code(s): 630 and 331
- FIPS code: 17-04078
- GNIS feature ID: 2394077
- Website: bataviail.gov

Batavia (/bəˈteɪviə/) is a city mainly in Kane County and partly in DuPage County in the U.S. state of Illinois. Located in the Chicago metropolitan area, it was founded in 1833 and is the oldest city in Kane County. Per the 2020 census, the population was 26,098.

During the latter part of the 19th century, Batavia, home to six American-style windmill manufacturing companies, became known as "The Windmill City". Fermi National Accelerator Laboratory, a federal government-sponsored high-energy physics laboratory, where both the bottom quark and the top quark were first detected, is located just east of the city limits.

Batavia is part of a vernacular region known as the Tri-City area, along with St. Charles and Geneva, all western suburbs of similar size and relative socioeconomic condition.

== History ==
Batavia was settled in 1833 by Christopher Payne and his family. Originally called Big Woods for the wild growth throughout the settlement, the town was renamed by local judge and former Congressman Isaac Wilson in 1840 after his former home of Batavia, New York, which was in turn named after the Batavian Republic, a short-lived republic that existed from 1795 to 1806 in the present-day Netherlands. Because Judge Wilson owned the majority of the town, he was given permission to rename it.

Batavia's settlement was delayed one year by the Black Hawk War, in which Abraham Lincoln was a citizen soldier, and Zachary Taylor and Jefferson Davis were Army officers. Although there is no direct evidence that Lincoln, Taylor, or Davis visited the future site of Batavia, there are writings by Lincoln that refer to "Head of the Big Woods", Batavia's original name. The city was incorporated on July 27, 1872.

After the death of her husband, Mary Todd Lincoln was an involuntary resident of the Batavia Institute on May 20, 1875. At the time the institute was known as Bellevue Place, a sanitarium for women. Mrs. Lincoln was released four months later on September 11, 1875. In the late 19th century, Batavia was a major manufacturer of the Conestoga wagons used in the country's westward expansion. Into the early 20th century, most of the windmill operated water pumps in use by America's farms were made at one of three windmill manufacturing companies in Batavia. Many of the limestone buildings of these factories remain in use as government and commercial offices, and storefronts. The Aurora Elgin and Chicago Railway constructed a power plant in southern Batavia and added a branch to the city in 1902. The Campana Factory was built in 1936 to manufacture cosmetics for The Campana Company, particularly Italian Balm, the nation's best-selling hand lotion at the time.

== Geography ==
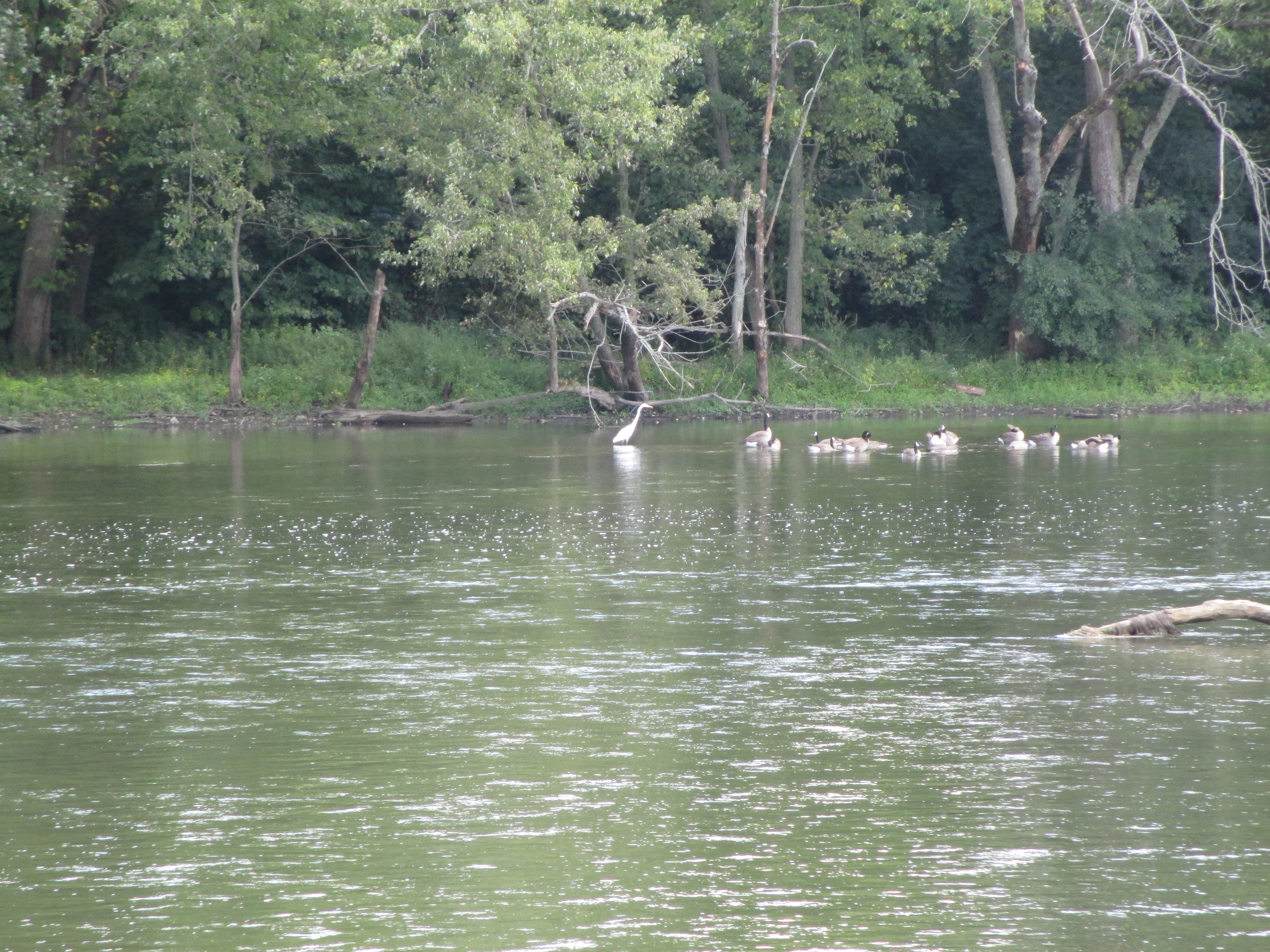
The Fox River has been of central significance to settlement and life in Batavia.

Batavia is located on the Fox River.

According to the 2021 census gazetteer files, Batavia has a total area of 10.84 square miles (28.08 km^{2}), of which 10.65 square miles (27.58 km^{2}) (or 98.28%) is land and 0.19 square miles (0.49 km^{2}) (or 1.72%) is water.

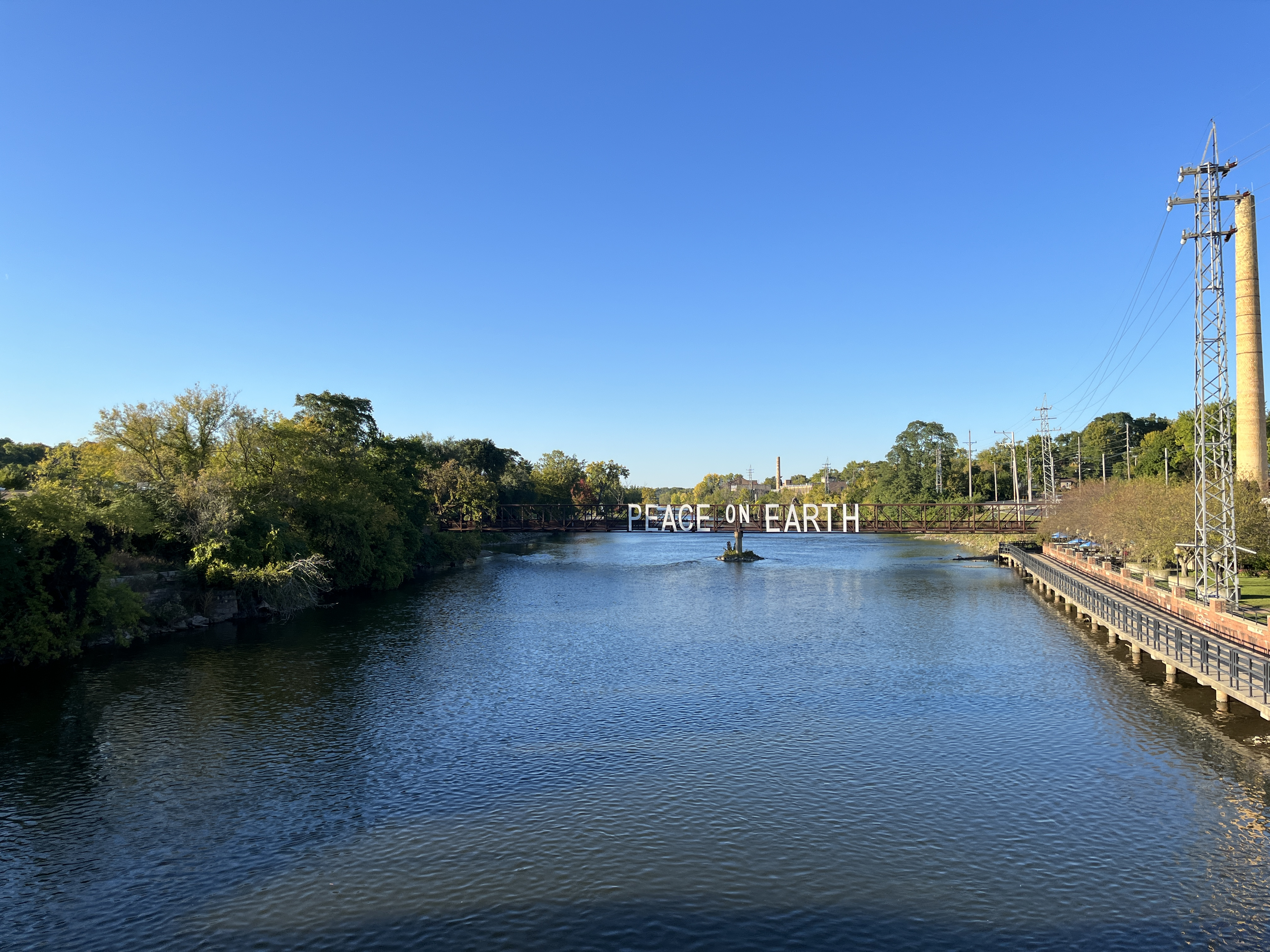
The Peace Bridge on the Fox River in Downtown Batavia

== Demographics ==
Historical population
Census	Pop.	Note	%±
1860	1,622		—
1880	2,639		—
1890	3,543		34.3%
1900	3,871		9.3%
1910	4,436		14.6%
1920	4,395		−0.9%
1930	5,045		14.8%
1940	5,101		1.1%
1950	5,838		14.4%
1960	7,496		28.4%
1970	9,060		20.9%
1980	12,574		38.8%
1990	17,076		35.8%
2000	23,866		39.8%
2010	26,045		9.1%
2020	26,098		0.2%
U.S. Decennial Census; 2010 2020

=== Racial and ethnic composition ===
Batavia city, Illinois – Racial and ethnic composition Note: the US Census treats Hispanic/Latino as an ethnic category. This table excludes Latinos from the racial categories and assigns them to a separate category. Hispanics/Latinos may be of any race.
Race / Ethnicity (NH = Non-Hispanic)	Pop 2000	Pop 2010	Pop 2020	% 2000	% 2010	% 2020
White alone (NH)	21,504	22,840	21,479	90.10%	87.69%	82.30%
Black or African American alone (NH)	540	611	608	2.26%	2.35%	2.33%
Native American or Alaska Native alone (NH)	16	38	11	0.07%	0.15%	0.04%
Asian alone (NH)	319	469	583	1.34%	1.80%	2.23%
Pacific Islander alone (NH)	1	3	2	0.00%	0.01%	0.01%
Other race alone (NH)	16	18	77	0.07%	0.07%	0.30%
Mixed race or Multiracial (NH)	213	291	944	0.89%	1.12%	3.62%
Hispanic or Latino (any race)	1,257	1,775	2,394	5.27%	6.82%	9.17%
Total	23,866	26,045	26,098	100.00%	100.00%	100.00%

=== 2020 census ===
As of the 2020 census, Batavia had a population of 26,098 and 9,970 households, of which 6,947 were families. The population density was 2,408.45 inhabitants per square mile (929.91/km^{2}).

The median age was 41.6 years. 24.2% of residents were under the age of 18 and 17.1% of residents were 65 years of age or older. For every 100 females there were 95.5 males, and for every 100 females age 18 and over there were 91.5 males age 18 and over.

100.0% of residents lived in urban areas, while 0.0% lived in rural areas.

Of the 9,970 households, 34.0% had children under the age of 18 living in them. Of all households, 58.9% were married-couple households, 13.0% were households with a male householder and no spouse or partner present, and 23.8% were households with a female householder and no spouse or partner present. About 24.8% of all households were made up of individuals and 12.8% had someone living alone who was 65 years of age or older.

There were 10,381 housing units at an average density of 958.01 per square mile (369.89/km^{2}), of which 4.0% were vacant. The homeowner vacancy rate was 0.9% and the rental vacancy rate was 6.2%.

Racial composition as of the 2020 census
Race	Number	Percent
White	21,982	84.2%
Black or African American	646	2.5%
American Indian and Alaska Native	63	0.2%
Asian	594	2.3%
Native Hawaiian and Other Pacific Islander	5	0.0%
Some other race	849	3.3%
Two or more races	1,959	7.5%
Hispanic or Latino (of any race)	2,394	9.2%

=== Income and poverty ===
The median income for a household in the city was $97,995, and the median income for a family was $123,247. Males had a median income of $69,895 versus $39,602 for females. The per capita income for the city was $46,134. About 3.6% of families and 5.9% of the population were below the poverty line, including 9.0% of those under age 18 and 5.5% of those age 65 or over.

== Economy ==
Aldi, Inc., the U.S. subsidiary of Aldi Süd, has its headquarters in Batavia.

Fermilab is located just outside the town borders and serves as employment for many of the town's residents.

According to the city's 2017 Comprehensive Annual Financial Report, the top employers in the city are:

#	Employer	# of employees
1	Fermi Forward Discovery Group, LLC.	1,700
2	Suncast Corporation	800
3	Aldi, Inc.	700
4	AGCO Corporation	365
5	Power Packaging	300
6	HOBI International	225
7	VWR Scientific	221
8	Batavia Container	160
9	Flinn Scientific Inc.	150
10	DS Containers, Inc.	140

== Arts and culture ==
Batavia is served by Batavia Public Library District, which was founded in April 1881 as a township library; the first Board of Library Trustees was elected in April 1882. It converted to a district library in June 1975. The library serves most of Batavia Township, Kane County, Illinois and portions of Winfield Township, DuPage County, Illinois, Geneva Township, Kane County, Illinois, and Blackberry Township, Kane County, Illinois. Its current facility opened in January 2002.

== Government ==
Batavia is a part of Illinois' 11th Congressional District, represented by Democrat Bill Foster. From 2013 to 2023, it was part of the 14th Congressional District, which was represented by Randy Hultgren and later Lauren Underwood.

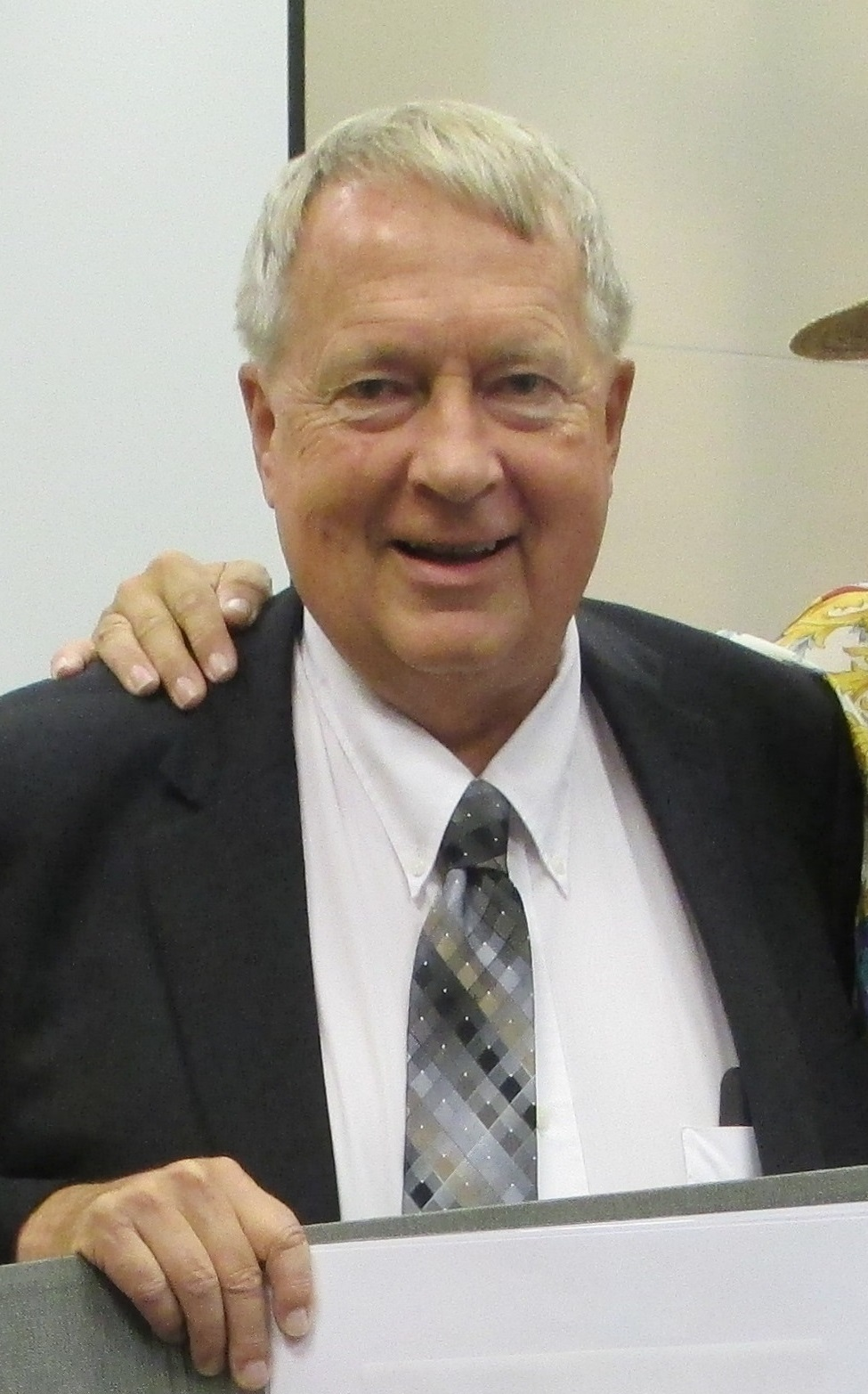
Mayor Schielke in 2016 (receiving a song about Batavia by local composer Birgit Ridderstedt)

Linda Holmes, Karina Villa, Barbara Hernandez, Matt Hanson, and Maura Hirschauer—all Democrats—represent parts of Batavia in the Illinois General Assembly.

Batavia is governed by a 14-member city council. There are seven wards in the city, and each ward elects two aldermen. The mayor chairs the city council and is elected citywide every four years.

Jeffery Schielke has been Mayor of Batavia since 1981.

== Education ==
Batavia is served by Batavia Public School District No. 101. The district currently consists of six K–5 elementary schools, one 6–8 middle school, and Batavia High School. Small pockets of the city are served by Geneva Community Unit School District 304 and West Aurora Public School District 129.

== Infrastructure ==
=== Transportation ===
Some bus transportation is serviced by Pace. The Geneva and Aurora Metra train stations are nearby. Paths for biking and walking exist along the Fox River. The Chicago & North Western Aurora Branch and the Burlington Route West Chicago line directly served Batavia until 1943.

Batavia is considered car-dependent and somewhat bikeable.

Major streets include:

- Batavia Avenue (IL-31)
- Main Street (Route 10)
- Randall Road
- Washington Street/River Street (IL-25)
- Wilson Street

== Notable people ==
- Ken Anderson, quarterback with the Cincinnati Bengals; grew up in Batavia
- Pat Branson, 9th mayor of Kodiak, Alaska
- Charlie Briggs, second baseman with the Chicago Browns
- Bernard J. Cigrand, father of Flag Day; lived in Batavia
- Jackie DeShannon, 1960s singer-songwriter; attended Batavia High School
- J. W. Eddy, 19th-century politician, lawyer and railway engineer, acquaintance of Abraham Lincoln; lived in Batavia
- Bill Foster, U.S. Congressman; lived in Batavia and worked at Fermilab
- Winfield S. Hall, physiologist and writer
- Dan Issel, power forward and coach in the Basketball Hall of Fame
- Mary Todd Lincoln, President Abraham Lincoln's wife; committed by her son to the Bellevue Place psychiatric hospital in Batavia (1875)
- Samuel D. Lockwood, politician and judge
- Meredith Mallory, former US Congressman
- Lyle Oberwise (b.1908 Batavia - 1993), noted photographer
- John F. Petit, businessman and politician; lived in Batavia
- Birgit Ridderstedt, folk singer and producer
- Craig Sager, sportscaster for TNT and TBS; born in Batavia
- Timothy Schmitz, former Illinois State Legislator; lives in Batavia and was a Batavia Firefighter
- Isaac Wilson, former US Congressman

== See also ==
- List of municipalities in Illinois
- National Register of Historic Places listings in Kane County, Illinois
