= Weston, DuPage County, Illinois =

Weston, Illinois
- Village (defunct)
- Location of Weston within Illinois
- Coordinates: 41°50′41.37″N 88°13′24.6″W
- Country: United States
- State: Illinois
- County: Dupage County
- Time zone: UTC-6 (CST)
  - Summer (DST): UTC-5 (CDT)
- Website: http://history.fnal.gov/

Weston was a community in DuPage County, Illinois, United States, near Batavia and Warrenville. It was voted out of existence by its village board in order to provide a site for the National Accelerator Laboratory (Fermilab), which was selected by the U.S. Atomic Energy Commission on December 16, 1966.

== History ==
Weston was predated by a 100 home subdivision named West Field, which was on the verge of growing in size due to a proposed development for 50,000 people. However, DuPage County sued developer William Riley in order to prevent the town from incorporating, basing their challenge upon a technicality, and further stated that as it had not properly incorporated that the town had no legal right to annex land for development. In April 1964, four months after the town's initial unveiling, the project had collapsed and the developer had filed for bankruptcy, blaming the county's lawsuit. Had construction proceeded as planned, the town would have contained the largest mall in North America, with some 2,000 stores within it. The town also was to have an airport, more than 11,000 homes, an athletics fields, a town center, and even large man-made lakes.

The subdivision was taken over by DuPage County, allowing the few existing residents to remain. The residents then worked again to incorporate as a town in an attempt to free themselves from DuPage County control, eventually seeking help from the Federal Government through the US Atomic Energy Commission. The National Academy of Sciences also made a visit to the site of the community, and in 1966, after much controversy from within both the community and the surrounding county, the community was chosen as the site for the new National Accelerator Laboratory. Shortly after, it was revealed that the town would be contained within the laboratory's boundaries, meaning that the community's residents had to sell their homes to the State of Illinois, and the community of Weston ceased to exist.

== Current use ==
The former residences are currently being used as offices and residences for the international collaborators with Fermilab who are based with an academic institution. Most of the houses are still an "academic village", and are still in use to this day.
