= Geneva Township, Illinois =

Geneva Township
- Township
- Location in Kane County

- Kane County's location in Illinois
- Coordinates: 41°52′34″N 088°19′19″W
- Country: United States
- State: Illinois
- County: Kane

Area
  - Total: 16.37 sq mi (42.4 km^{2})
  - Land: 16.09 sq mi (41.7 km^{2})
  - Water: 0.28 sq mi (0.73 km^{2}) 1.69%
- Elevation: 735 ft (224 m)

Population (2020)
  - Total: 26,396
  - Density: 1,641/sq mi (633.4/km^{2})
- FIPS code: 17-089-28885
- GNIS feature ID: 0429046
- Website: www.genevatownship.com

Geneva Township is in Kane County, Illinois. As of the 2020 census, its population was 26,396 and it contained 10,601 housing units.

== Geography ==
Unlike the prototypical Midwestern township, which is a six-mile (9.7 km) square, Geneva Township splits a six-mile square with Batavia Township. According to the 2021 census gazetteer files, Geneva Township has a total area of 16.37 square miles (42.40 km^{2}), of which 16.09 square miles (41.67 km^{2}) (or 98.31%) is land and 0.28 square miles (0.73 km^{2}) (or 1.69%) is water. It is divided by the Fox River.

== Cities, Towns, Villages ==
- Batavia (northern segment)
- Geneva (vast majority)

== Unincorporated Town ==
- Wenmoth Acres at 41.850307°N 88.365356°W

== Demographics ==
As of the 2020 census there were 26,396 people, 9,853 households, and 7,287 families residing in the township. The population density was 1,612.86 inhabitants per square mile (622.73/km^{2}). There were 10,601 housing units at an average density of 647.75 per square mile (250.10/km^{2}). The racial makeup of the township was 87.58% White, 0.78% African American, 0.25% Native American, 2.35% Asian, 0.01% Pacific Islander, 2.08% from other races, and 6.95% from two or more races. Hispanic or Latino of any race were 7.29% of the population.

There were 9,853 households, out of which 35.70% had children under the age of 18 living with them, 61.32% were married couples living together, 9.53% had a female householder with no spouse present, and 26.04% were non-families. 22.00% of all households were made up of individuals, and 13.90% had someone living alone who was 65 years of age or older. The average household size was 2.71 and the average family size was 3.15.

The township's age distribution consisted of 24.7% under the age of 18, 7.1% from 18 to 24, 23.3% from 25 to 44, 28.5% from 45 to 64, and 16.4% who were 65 years of age or older. The median age was 41.2 years. For every 100 females, there were 89.5 males. For every 100 females age 18 and over, there were 86.7 males.

The median income for a household in the township was $115,836, and the median income for a family was $135,329. Males had a median income of $81,161 versus $44,099 for females. The per capita income for the township was $51,874. About 2.7% of families and 3.4% of the population were below the poverty line, including 4.5% of those under age 18 and 2.9% of those age 65 or over.

Historical population
Census	Pop.	Note	%±
2000	23,267		—
2010	26,552		14.1%
2020	26,396		−0.6%
U.S. Decennial Census
