= Plainfield North High School =

Public school in Illinois, United States

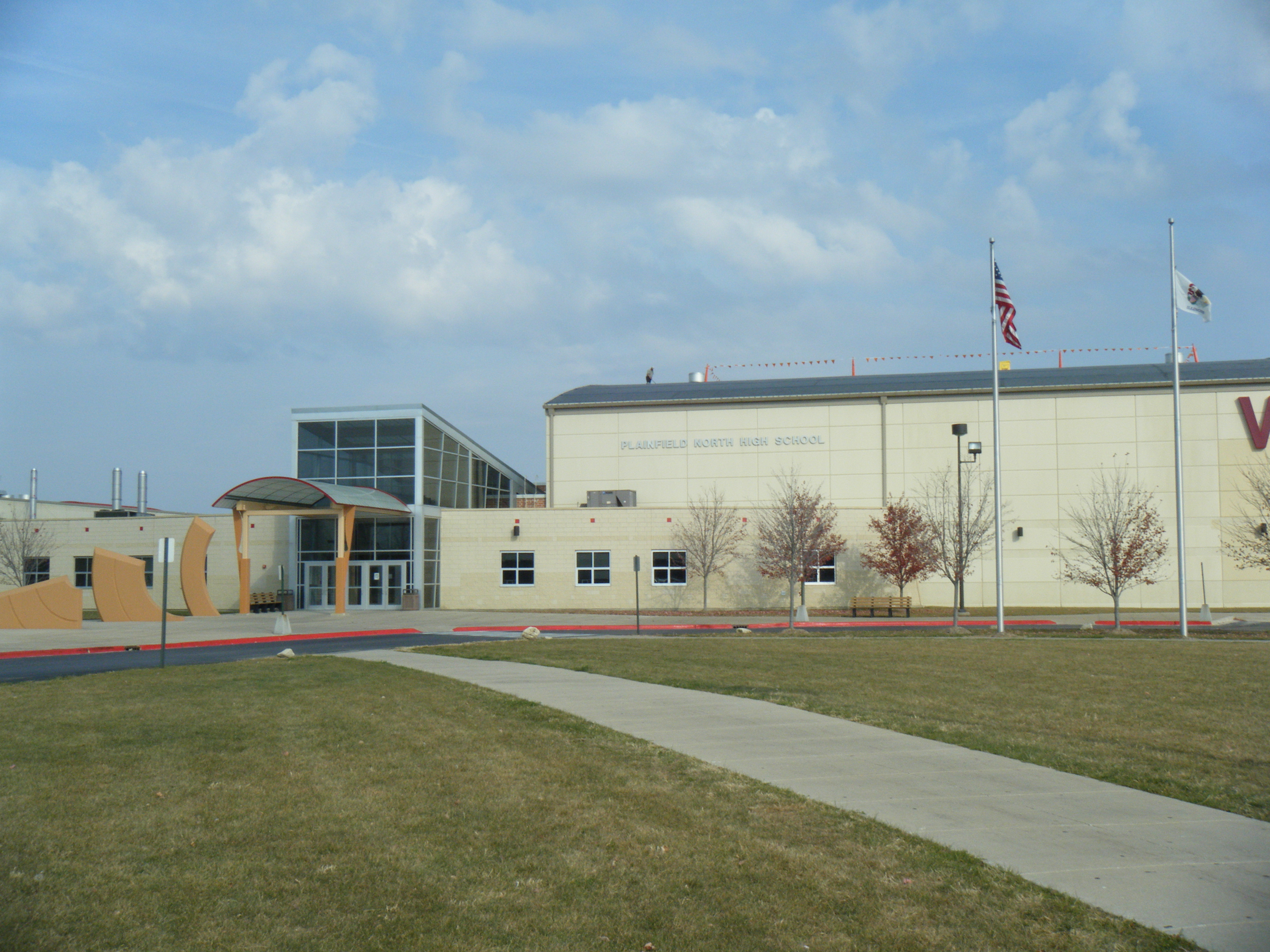

Location
- 12005 S. 248th Avenue; Plainfield, Illinois 60585; United States; 41°39′43.9″N 88°13′15.4″W

Information
- School type: Public
- Motto: "Keep roaring, Tigers"
- Established: 2005
- School district: Plainfield Community Consolidated School District 202
- Principal: Ross Draper
- Teaching staff: 135.80 (FTE)
- Grades: 9–12
- Gender: Coed
- Enrollment: 2,365 (2023–2024)
- Average class size: 23
- Student to teacher ratio: 17.42
- Campus type: Suburban
- Colors: Crimson; White
- Athletics conference: Southwest Prairie Conference
- Team name: Tigers
- Newspaper: The Prowler
- Website: pnhs.psd202.org

Plainfield North High School (PNHS) is a four-year public high school located in Plainfield, Illinois, a southwest suburb of Chicago, in the United States. Founded in August 2005, it is one of four high schools in the Plainfield Community Consolidated School District 202. As of October 2021, it serves students who live in northern Plainfield, parts Plainfield, Wheatland, and Na-Au-Say Townships, and a small portion of southern Naperville.

== History ==
Due to a rapidly growing population, PNHS was established to ease student overflow in Plainfield's other schools, Plainfield South High School and Plainfield Central High School. It opened in the beginning of the 2005-06 school year for incoming freshmen and sophomores only. As the years went on and classes progressed into the upper classes of juniors and seniors, additional classes were added in their place with the school becoming a full-fledged four year high school in the 2007-2008 academic year. During the 2008-2009 academic year, a small portion of PNHS students were re-zoned to the newly opened Plainfield East High School. Most students who were transferred lived in the Bolingbrook, Illinois area.

== Academics ==
=== Testing ===
Plainfield North began ACT testing in April 2007 and graduated its first class in 2008 with 512 students. As of the 2010-2011 academic year, PNHS's mean ACT score is 22.1 and the mean PSAE score is 160. Based on PNHS's test performance, SchoolDigger ranks PNHS 104th of 667 Illinois public high schools.

=== Achievements ===
For the 2011-2012 academic year, 40 PNHS students were named AP Scholars and four students were named AP Scholars with Honor. In the same year, four PNHS students were also earned National Merit Commended Status through the PSAT/NMSQT, the most from any other District 202 high schools that year.

== Athletics ==
Plainfield North competes in the Southwest Prairie Conference and Illinois High School Association, and its mascot is the Tiger. Girls Volleyball, Boys Track, as well as the girls' track team, won conference in their first year with seniors. The girls' team was also undefeated. In the 2007-2008 season, girls' bowling won both conference and sectional titles and advanced to the state competition where they placed 13th. The Plainfield North girls volleyball team made Plainfield North history by being the first team to win a Sectional championship at Plainfield North in the 2014-2015 season. They have won 3 Regional championships and 3 conference championship titles in a row also. In October 2010, then PNHS running back Kapri Bibbs broke the 24-year-old state record for most rushing yards in one game during a game against Oswego High School, achieving 520 yards along with seven touchdowns. In 2010, the PNHS marching band finished at 8th place at the Illinois State University competition, marking the highest finish for any District 202 marching band since 1998. In 2013, the marching band placed 3rd at ISU, attracting considerable attention from the band community and made history for the Plainfield high schools. The marching band has seen continued success, winning local competitions and competing in BOA regionals. Most recently the marching tigers placed 10th in finals at ISMBC in 2022. In 2016, the football team finished second in Class 7A, falling to East St. Louis in the title game. In 2018, the baseball team won the 4A state championship.

== Controversies ==
In 2006, PNHS's football program was found to be in violation of multiple Illinois High School Association rules, mainly stemming from illegal recruitment of players. As a result, the PNHS football team was barred from competing in the state playoffs for the next two years and the head coach of the football program, Dan Darlington, was suspended for the remainder of the 2006-2007 season. Dr. Peter Pasteris, the school's inaugural principal, was also barred from acting as the school's official representative to the IHSA, later being dismissed as the school's principal after a vote by the school board.

During the 2010-2011 school year, there have been 2 separate incidents involving inappropriate teacher/student relationships. A former dance teacher was allegedly caught by police having sex with a male 16-year-old student in the parking lot of a Kohl's at around 6:00 p.m. on a school night and was brought to trial for sexual abuse in 2011. Later in the year, the former Athletic director was pressured to resign after news of a questionable relationship with a former student emerged.

On July 10, 2013, the business teacher and wrestling coach was arrested and held on $300,000 bail on child pornography charges. He was a non-tenured teacher who passed all background checks when he was hired. He later resigned from his teaching post.

== Notable alumni ==
- Kapri Bibbs, former NFL running back
- Justin Yeager, professional baseball player
- Marcellus Moore, professional sprinter
