= 1990 Plainfield tornado =

Deadly tornado in Illinois

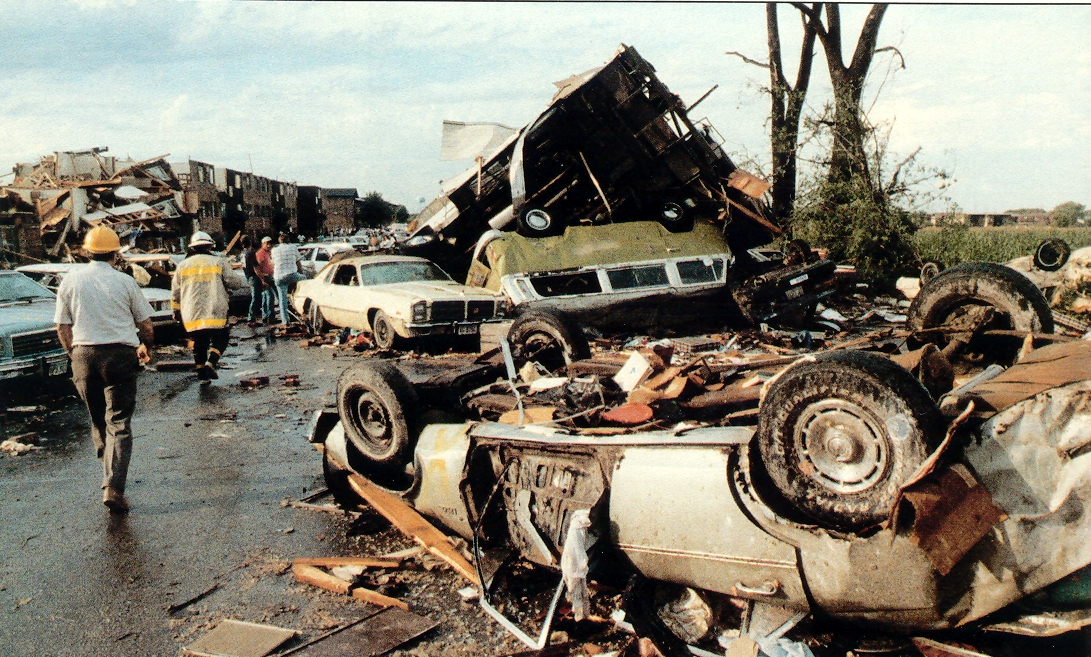
- Multiple cars flipped over, and multiple homes and buildings destroyed in Plainfield by the tornado.

Meteorological history
- Formed: August 28, 1990 3:15 p.m. CDT
- Dissipated: August 28, 1990 3:45 p.m. CDT
- Duration: 30 minutes

F5 tornado
- on the Fujita scale
- Highest winds: >261 mph (420 km/h)

Overall effects
- Fatalities: 29
- Injuries: 353
- Damage: $165 million $380 million (2024 USD)
- Areas affected: Oswego, Plainfield, Crest Hill, and Joliet
- Part of the tornado outbreaks of 1990

The 1990 Plainfield tornado was a devastating tornado that struck Plainfield, Illinois in the Chicago metropolitan area during the afternoon of August 28, 1990. The violent tornado killed 29 people and injured 353. It is the only F5/EF5 rated tornado officially recorded in August in the United States (the 1883 Rochester, Minnesota tornado is unofficially considered an F5), and the only F5 tornado to strike the Chicago area. There are no known videos or photographs of the tornado itself; however, in 2011, a video surfaced online showing the supercell that spawned the tornado. The Plainfield tornado was part of a small outbreak that produced several tornadoes in the Northern United States, specifically Kansas, and the Canadian province of Ontario.

The tornado was relatively abnormal, moving southeast instead of the conventional northeast motion of violent tornadoes. The event, as well as its poor warning time, drove advancements in radar technology and forecasting systems to adequately warn residents.

== Meteorological synopsis ==
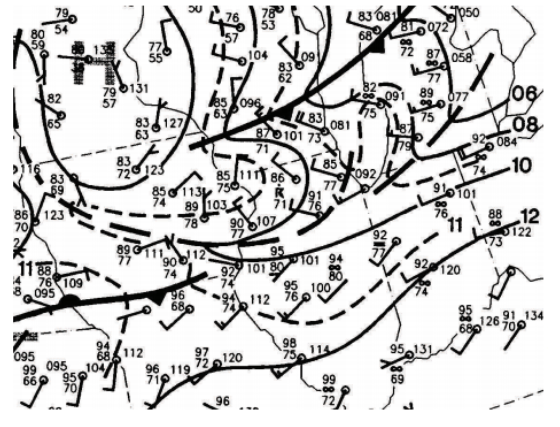
August 28 surface map showing the hot and moist air mass in place with a cold front pushing in.

For late August standards, August 28 was a particularly warm and humid day. Temperatures reached into the low 90s °F (32–34 °C; about 11 °F or 6 °C warmer than the normal of 79 °F – 26 °C), but dew points soared into the upper 70s °F (25–27 °C). The presence of such a high dew point did not necessarily predict a severe thunderstorm outbreak; the prior day, similar conditions existed in northern Illinois with the exception of a warmer mid level troposphere. A warmer atmosphere inhibits the rising of surface air through the atmosphere; a requirement for convective precipitation (precipitation resulting from humid surface air ascending to condense in a cooler atmosphere above) to occur. This warmer air aloft can describe either (or both) weak lapse rates, thus weak instability or a capping inversion.

The atmosphere on August 28 was significantly more unstable as the approach of a low-pressure system from the northwest cooled the mid levels (and also caused dynamic lifting) as instability continued to build in the capped, muggy environment, although the wind fields (strong, but out of the west-northwest and unidirectional) were not suitable for significant tornadic development. As a result of the very high low-level temperature and dew point, convective available potential energy (CAPE) values were in excess of 8,000 J/kg; generally, values of 1,500 J/kg are considered to be moderately unstable, whereas values of more than 4,000 J/kg are considered "extreme". The lifted index (LI), the dominant estimate of instability used at the time, was also extreme. Generally, an LI value of −6 °C or below readily supports severe thunderstorm development, but during the day the LI value ranged from −12 °C to −14 °C. Such extreme instability can lead to explosive thunderstorm development, very strong updrafts, and modulation of the updraft to better enable tornadogenesis.

Conditions were ripe for severe thunderstorm development, and with both low level and high level steering winds from the west-northwest, the National Severe Storms Forecast Center issued a Severe Thunderstorm Watch for northern Illinois valid 1:30 p.m. through 8:00 p.m. CDT that night. The NSSFC predicted a derecho-type event for later that night as rapidly developing thunderstorms along a cold front in Wisconsin would be carried by the steering flow into the Chicago area. One of these storms developed supercellular characteristics south of Rockford, steering 30 to 40 degrees to the right of prevailing steering winds. By now, mid-level steering winds had begun to veer, causing a wind profile slightly more favorable for tornadic development. This helped develop a high precipitation supercell.

The "HP" supercell produced multiple funnel sightings, hail damage, and damaging winds south of Rockford before heading southeast toward Will County and dropped a rain wrapped tornado. This is why many in the path did not see the actual tornado but more of a wall of water and dark clouds coming toward them. As the storm continued south it produced a 16-mile (26 km) swath of damage ranging from F1 to F5 intensity. The National Weather Service in Rosemont, Illinois, serving all of Central and Northern Illinois at the time, did not issue a Tornado Warning until 10 minutes after the tornado had hit Plainfield. Despite radar technology being less developed than now, the storm had a well defined hook echo on radar imagery, a signature often correlated with tornadic supercells.

== Tornado summary ==
The supercell that would produce the Plainfield tornado, seen at 2:45 p.m. from DeKalb, Illinois

Loop of radar data from the Plainfield supercell.

The tornado formed from a supercell thunderstorm, which initially formed in the vicinity of Janesville in south central Wisconsin, shortly after 12 p.m. CDT. It produced a tornado near Pecatonica, Illinois in Winnebago County, about 15 mi (24 km) west of Rockford, that touched down at about 1:42 p.m. That tornado did not last long; however, the storm continued to move southeast towards the Aurora area, and spawned four short-lived, predecessor tornadoes in southwestern Kane County, between 2:45 p.m. and 3:15 p.m. Within that time period, the storm also struck the Aurora Municipal Airport in Sugar Grove at about 3:05 p.m., lasting until 3:10 p.m., where propeller planes were flipped, and the control tower was evacuated, but no injuries were reported.

Continuing to move to the southeast, starting at about 3:15 p.m., the supercell spawned the principal tornado, touching down near Oswego in Kendall County, and rapidly strengthening into a F2 and F3 tornado as it approached Will County. The tornado traveled southeast into Wheatland Township, Will County, near the Wheatland Plains subdivision, northwest of Plainfield. At 3:25 p.m. in Wheatland Township, the tornado damaged nearly all of the homes in the Wheatland Plains subdivision where there were several injuries, including one child who had to be airlifted to Loyola University Hospital in Maywood and later died of injuries. Twelve homes were destroyed in Wheatland Plains.

Past Wheatland Plains, the tornado continued to strengthen as it tore across open farmland, and reached F5 intensity in this area. A narrow swath of very intense ground scouring was observed, as mature corn crop was completely stripped from the ground, leaving nothing but bare soil behind. Several inches of topsoil were removed as well. As the tornado crossed US-30, a 20-ton tractor-trailer was thrown more than half a mile from the road, killing the driver. Three other motorists were killed in this area as their vehicles were thrown from the road. Some cars were picked up and carried considerable distances through the air. It was determined that the tornado reached its peak strength in this area, and the F5 rating was based on the extreme ground scouring that occurred. Beyond this point, the ground scouring became less pronounced as the tornado weakened slightly as it approached Plainfield at high-end F4 intensity.

The tornado struck Plainfield, Illinois, around 3:28 p.m. Around 3:30 p.m. the tornado directly struck the Plainfield High School, killing a science teacher and two maintenance workers. Students who had been out practicing for the fall football programs ran into the high school to take shelter a few minutes before the storm hit. After an alarm was pulled by a dean in the main office, the volleyball players preparing for a game in the gymnasium rushed to the nearest door and took shelter in the hallway. It has been reported that as soon as the last player was through the door, a coach quickly closed it, only for it to be immediately ripped back off by the storm. The gymnasium proceeded to fall apart and crash down, which filled the gap in the doorway. They took shelter in the same hallway as the football team, and once the tornado had passed, that was the only hallway left standing in the building.

The tornado then demolished the Plainfield School District Administration building, where the wife of a custodian was killed. The tornado crossed Route 59 (Division Street) and ripped into St. Mary Immaculate Church and school, claiming an additional 3 lives; the principal of the school, a music teacher, and the son of the cook at the rectory. Fifty-five homes were destroyed in Plainfield itself, a few of which were swept away. A grocery store east of the high school was badly damaged. Gravestones in the nearby cemetery were toppled, and a metal dumpster was found wrapped around the top of a partially debarked tree. Damage in Plainfield was rated as high-end F4.

The storm then worked its way southeast towards the large city of Joliet, damaging homes in the Crystal Lawns, Lily Cache and Warwick subdivisions and killing five more people: one in the Lily Cache subdivision of Plainfield, and two each in the Crystal Lawns and Warwick subdivisions; an additional three people would later succumb from injuries sustained during the storm. The tornado ripped through the Grand Prairie Elementary School (Plainfield School District), causing significant damage. Observers watched from the doors at the Louis Joliet Mall, as the tornado passed just southwest of them. Sixty-nine homes were destroyed in Crystal Lawns, 75 homes were destroyed in Peerless Estates, 55 homes were destroyed in Lily Cache, and 50 homes were destroyed in Warwick. Most of the homes in Peerless Estates and Warwick were newly built.

The tornado then moved towards Crest Hill. At 3:38 p.m. the storm ripped through the Crest Hill Lakes Apartment complex, where it caused F3 damage and claimed another eight lives, destroying one apartment building and half of another apartment building. Neither have been rebuilt. The tornado also ripped through the Colony West subdivision, destroying 12 townhomes, none of which have been rebuilt either. A married couple died while in their car on Cedarwood Drive outside the apartment complex. The tornado then destroyed three apartment buildings on Elizabeth Court. Three more homes were destroyed in Bridalwreath, southeast of Elizabeth Court. Homes were damaged on Arden Place, and two high tension wire structures were destroyed at Douglas Street and Palladium Drive West.

Further southeast, the tornado continued to lose strength and lifted near Woodlawn Avenue and Campbell Street in Joliet. The parent thunderstorm continued until it crossed over the Indiana border, where it dissipated around 4:30 p.m.

The Plainfield Tornado caused over $165 million worth of damage. As the storm tore through Plainfield, nine people were killed (one additional victim would die afterward, from carbon monoxide poisoning, while guarding his home after the storm). The remaining victims were from Joliet and Crest Hill. In all, a total of 29 people would die because of the tornado. A total of 353 people were also injured in storm. This was the deadliest tornado event in the region since the 1967 Oak Lawn tornado.

== Aftermath ==
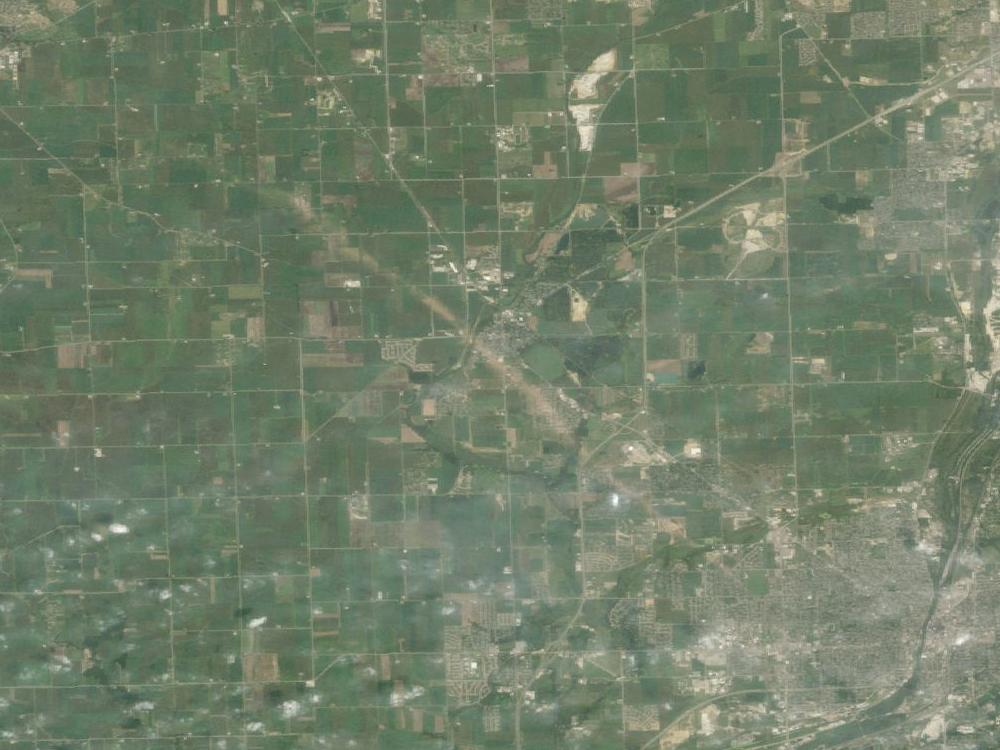
The scar from the tornado, taken the following month

=== Tornado preparedness ===
The Plainfield Tornado challenged both meteorologists and citizens in terms of tornado preparedness. Substantial safety measures have been enacted in the years following the tornado; among the improvements are frequent and regular tornado drills performed in schools.

After the tornado, meteorologists studying tornadic patterns in the area found that a major tornado (F3 or higher) strikes Will County about every 12 to 15 years. There have been no major tornadoes in the county since 1990. However, an F1 tornado swept through the historic Cathedral Area in the near west side of Joliet on April 20, 2004. The most recent major tornado to strike the Chicago metropolitan area was an EF3 tornado that struck just north of the county line with DuPage county on June 20, 2021.

=== Deployment of NEXRAD ===
The development of NEXRAD (Next Generation Radar) has contributed greatly to the ability of meteorologists to recognize tornadic activity. Whereas previous generations of radar could show only reflectivity data and no direct information on air flows, although tornadic supercells and tornadic signatures such as the hook echo and bounded weak echo region (BWER) were identifiable, NEXRAD contained the ability to detect the wind speed and direction inside the storm. The ability to see rotation inside a storm on both the microscale (tornadic) and mesoscale (supercellular) measurements has allowed forecasters to issue severe thunderstorm and tornado warnings in more timely fashion and with a higher probability of detection.

=== Forecast criticism ===
In the months following the tornado, the National Weather Service was heavily criticized for providing no warning of the approaching tornado. The NOAA Disaster Survey Report was highly critical of the forecast process within the Chicago office as well as coordination with local spotter networks and the preparedness of these groups. Prior to 1990, the National Weather Service in Chicago was responsible for providing forecasts for the entire state of Illinois.

As the Chicago office was overwhelmed with its workload, no warnings were issued by the office until 2:32 p.m.; nearly an hour after the first tornado was sighted southeast of Rockford. A second severe thunderstorm warning was issued almost an hour later at 3:23 p.m., but this provided no indication that a tornado was on the ground and did not mention the area where the tornado had tracked. No tornado warning was issued until after the tornado lifted. Even though the Chicago office had an "add-on" Doppler improvement that was developed in 1974, that device had been disabled by a lightning strike before the August 28 storm.

As a result of the lack of a warning, many meteorologists today refer to the "Plainfield Syndrome" as the idea that it's better to issue too many warnings and be wrong, than to miss one critical warning, as was the case for the Plainfield Tornado.

After the 1990 tornado, the National Weather Service reduced the Chicago office's workload by creating an office in Romeoville, Illinois in 1993, as well as in Lincoln, Illinois in 1995, and allowing offices in the Quad Cities, St. Louis, Missouri, Indianapolis, Indiana and Paducah, Kentucky to issue forecasts for their respective areas.

=== Memorial Site ===
In the years following the disaster, a permanent Tornado Plainfield Victim Memorial located in Plainfield, Illinois was erected, thanking those who aided in its recovery. A dedication ceremony is held at this location where hundreds gather every year, including both survivors and victims' family members. The 30th anniversary memorial was held at this location on August 28, 2020, as church bells rang at exactly 3:28 PM.

== See also ==
- List of F5, EF5, and IF5 tornadoes
- Tornadoes in Chicago
- Jarrell tornado, another poorly predicted tornado traveling an unusual direction
- 1967 Belvidere tornado, another unwarned tornado in Illinois; warning was not issued until thirteen minutes after striking Belvidere
- June 2022 Chicago supercell, an exceptionally powerful non-tornadic supercell following a similar motion vector
