= Valley View Community Unit School District 365U =

School district in Illinois, United States

Location
- Romeoville, Illinois United States

District information
- Type: Public School District
- Motto: Every Learner. Every Day.
- Grades: K-12
- Established: 1972
- Superintendent: Teresa Polson
- Schools: 21
- NCES District ID: 1740070
- District ID: 365U

Students and staff
- Students: 14,529
- Faculty: 2,400

Other information
- Website: www.vvsd.org

Valley View Community Unit School District 365U (VVSD) is located about 35 miles southwest of downtown Chicago, where Interstates 55 & 355 intersect. The district consists of nearly all of Bolingbrook and Romeoville, Illinois along with portions of Plainfield, Lockport, and Downers Grove. VVSD serves the educational needs of more than 14,500 students in 21 educational facilities. Valley View School District 365U is one of Will County's largest employers, with more than 2,400 full-time employees.

Voters have approved several referendum proposals in the past decade, including approval by more than a 67% margin in a $142.3 million referendum in March, 2002. No additional referendums have been requested since 2002. The Equalized Assessed Valuation of the district now stands at more than $2.1 billion. Standard & Poor's (AA−) and Moody's (A1) have both upgraded the district's bond rating in late 2005. This has resulted in a lower bond interest cost for taxpayers. The financial outlook for the next several years remains positive with additional retail and industrial property development, and slowing residential construction occurring in both communities within the district boundaries.

== History ==
Formed in 1972 as several smaller districts consolidated to meet the needs of a growing community, School District 365U was originally known as District 96. It took its present name when it became the first school district in the United States to implement the 45-15 plan, in which schools were occupied year round with 3/4 of the students in session at any one time. Students went to school for 9 weeks and then had 3 weeks off. Additionally, teachers were optionally allowed to work year-round. This practice is no longer in use.

== Schools ==
=== Early childhood ===
School's name	Location	Mascot	Principal
Dr. James Mitchem Early Childhood Center/Formerly Valley View Elementary School	Romeoville	Turtle	Tionia Williams
Debbie Sykora Early Childhood Center	Bolingbrook	Turtle	Tionia Williams

=== Elementary ===
School's name	Location	Mascot	Principal
Bernard J. Ward Elementary School	Bolingbrook	Wildcats	Kathleen Nigro
Beverly Skoff Elementary School	Romeoville	Titans	Michael Aguilar
Independence Elementary School	Bolingbrook	Eagles	Lizzeth Fausto
Irene King Elementary School/Formerly Ridge View Elementary School	Romeoville	Bears	April Vacik
Jamie McGee Elementary School	Bolingbrook	Shamrocks	Anthony Valenza
John R. Tibbott Elementary School/Formerly Brook View Elementary School	Bolingbrook	Tigers	Amanda Tucker
Jonas E. Salk Elementary School	Bolingbrook	Crusaders	Alyson Ewald
Kenneth L. Hermansen Elementary School	Romeoville	Huskies	Joshua Gage
Oak View Elementary School	Bolingbrook	Panthers	Jennifer Duffy
Pioneer Elementary School	Bolingbrook	Timberwolves	Robert Pinciak
Robert C. Hill Elementary School/Formerly Park View Elementary School	Romeoville	Tigers	Michael Romeo
Wood View Elementary School	Bolingbrook	Dragons	Loretta Furtute

=== Middle ===
School's name	Location	Mascot	Principal
A. Vito Martinez Middle School/Formerly West View Middle School	Romeoville	Vikings	Russell Normand
Brooks Middle School/Formerly Bolingbrook High School	Bolingbrook	Bulldogs	Patrick Meginniss
Hubert H. Humphrey Middle School	Bolingbrook	Warriors	Dan Laverty
Jane Addams Middle School	Bolingbrook	Mustangs	Sonia Ruiz
John J. Lukancic Middle School	Romeoville	Flames	Tricia Rollerson

=== High ===
School's name	Location	Mascot	Principal
Bolingbrook High School	Bolingbrook	Raiders	Jason Pascavage
Romeoville High School/Formerly Lockport West High School	Romeoville	Spartans	Derek Kinder

=== Alternative ===
School's name	Location	Mascot	Asst. Director of Student Services
Secondary Transition Experience Program (STEP)	Bolingbrook	Eagles	Marissa Trueblood-Seifert
