= Southwest Prairie Conference =

High school athletic conference in Illinois, USA

- Conference: IHSA
- No. of teams: 12
- Region: Northern Illinois & Southern Chicagoland

The Southwest Prairie Conference (SPC) is an American athletic and competitive activity conference consisting of twelve public high schools in Northern Illinois. These high schools are all members of the Illinois High School Association. The conference was founded prior to the 2006–2007 academic year with eight members, mostly from the Suburban Prairie Conference.

== History ==
The conference began competing during the 2006–2007 academic year, with Minooka Community High School, Morris Community High School, Oswego High School, Oswego East High School, Plainfield Central High School, Plainfield North High School, Plainfield South High School, and Romeoville High School as founding members. All but Romeoville, who came from the former South Inter-Conference Association North division, and Plainfield North, a newly established school, made up the South Division of the Suburban Prairie Conference. Morris left the SPC following the 2008–09 school year to join the North Central Illinois Conference, with newly established Plainfield East High School replacing them.

Joliet Central High School and Joliet West High School joined the conference from the Southwest Suburban Conference at the start of the 2016–2017 school year, following a 2014 decision. Both West Aurora High School, of the Upstate Eight Conference, and Yorkville High School, of the former Northern Illinois Big 12 Conference, were admitted to the SPC in 2018 and began conference play during the 2019–20 school year. In 2024, West Aurora High School departed for the Upstate Eight Conference, with Bolingbrook High School of the Southwest Suburban Conference replacing them.

== Member schools ==
Current locations of Southwest Prairie Conference Schools

=== East Division ===
| School name | Location | Team name | Colors |
|---|---|---|---|
| Joliet Central High School | Joliet | Steelmen & Steelwomen | |
| Joliet West High School | Joliet | Tigers | |
| Plainfield Central High School | Plainfield | Wildcats | |
| Plainfield East High School | Plainfield | Bengals | |
| Plainfield South High School | Plainfield | Cougars | |
| Romeoville High School | Romeoville | Spartans | |

=== West Division ===
| School name | Location | Team name | Colors |
|---|---|---|---|
| Bolingbrook High School | Bolingbrook | Raiders | |
| Minooka Community High School | Minooka | Indians | |
| Oswego High School | Oswego | Panthers | |
| Oswego East High School | Oswego | Wolves | |
| Plainfield North High School | Plainfield | Tigers | |
| Yorkville High School | Yorkville | Foxes | |
