= Tyler Lancaster =

American football player (born 1994)

Profile
- Position: Nose tackle

Personal information
- Born: November 4, 1994 (age 32); Naperville, Illinois, U.S.
- Listed height: 6 ft 4 in (1.93 m)
- Listed weight: 313 lb (142 kg)

Career information
- High school: Plainfield East (Plainfield, Illinois)
- College: Northwestern (2013–2017)
- NFL draft: 2018: undrafted

Career history
- Green Bay Packers (2018–2021); Las Vegas Raiders (2022)*; Denver Broncos (2023)
- * Offseason or practice squad member only

Career NFL statistics
- Total tackles: 113
- Sacks: 1.5
- Forced fumbles: 1
- Fumble recoveries: 1
- Pass deflections: 1
- Stats at Pro Football Reference

Tyler Coatney Lancaster (born November 4, 1994) is an American professional football nose tackle. He played college football at Northwestern, and was signed by the Green Bay Packers as an undrafted free agent in 2018.

== Early life ==
Lancaster was born in Naperville, Illinois and grew up in Romeoville, Illinois. He attended Plainfield East High School, where he played center. Lancaster did not surrender a sacks over the three years he played for the Bengals' varsity football team and was named first-team All-State by the Chicago Tribune. He was ranked the sixth-best center in his class by Rivals.com and tenth by Scout.com and a three star prospect by ESPN.com. Lancaster ultimately committed to play college football at Northwestern over offers from Bowling Green, Central Michigan, Eastern Michigan, and Western Michigan.

== College career ==
Lancaster redshirted his first year at Northwestern, during which he switched positions from the offensive line to defensive tackle. He became a three-year starter for the Wildcats, starting the last 39 games of his career, and accumulated 101 total tackles, 18.5 tackles for loss and 3.5 sacks. As a senior, Lancaster was named a team captain and set career highs in 40 tackles, 9.5 tackles for loss, and 2 sacks and was named honorable mention All-Big Ten.

== Professional career ==
Pre-draft measurables
Height	Weight	Arm length	Hand span	40-yard dash	10-yard split	20-yard split	20-yard shuttle	Three-cone drill	Vertical jump	Broad jump	Bench press
6 ft 3 1/2 in (1.92 m)	313 lb (142 kg)	32 7/8 in (0.84 m)	10 3/4 in (0.27 m)	5.01 s	1.87 s	2.88 s	4.60 s	7.46 s	27.0 in (0.69 m)	9 ft 5 in (2.87 m)	32 reps
All values from Pro Day

=== Green Bay Packers ===
Lancaster signed with the Green Bay Packers as an undrafted free agent on April 28, 2018. He was cut by the Packers at the end of training camp and then subsequently re-signed to the team's practice squad. Lancaster was signed to the Packers' active roster on October 6, 2018, and made his NFL debut the following day in a 31–23 loss to the Detroit Lions, appearing on special teams. Lancaster made his first career start on November 25, 2018, recording one tackle in a 24–17 loss to the Minnesota Vikings. In his rookie season, Lancaster appeared in 12 games (5 starts) and made 25 tackles, including one for loss.

In week 8 of the 2019 season against the Kansas City Chiefs, Lancaster forced a fumble on running back LeSean McCoy and recovered the ball in the 31–24 win. In 2019 he played in all 16 games with 10 starts for the Packers during the regular season and recorded 30 tackles, 1.5 sacks, a forced fumble and a fumble recovery and started both of the team's playoff games. On April 25, 2020, the Packers re-signed Lancaster to a one-year contract as an exclusive-rights free agent.

Lancaster re-signed with the Packers on March 30, 2021. He was placed on the reserve/COVID-19 list on September 28, 2021. He was activated on October 9, 2021.

=== Las Vegas Raiders ===
Lancaster signed as free agent with the Las Vegas Raiders on May 25, 2022. On August 28, 2022, Lancaster was placed on injured reserve. He was released on September 5, 2022.

=== Denver Broncos ===
On May 23, 2023, Lancaster signed with the Denver Broncos. He was released on August 29, 2023, and re-signed to the practice squad. He was not signed to a reserve/future contract and thus became a free agent at the end of the season.

== NFL career statistics ==
=== Regular season ===
Year	Team	Games		Tackles				Interceptions				Fumbles			
Year	Team	GP	GS	Total	Solo	Ast	Sck	PD	Int	Yds	TD	FF	FR	Yds	TD
2018	GB	12	5	26	19	7	0.0	0	0	0	0	0	0	0	0
2019	GB	16	10	30	17	13	1.5	0	0	0	0	1	1	0	0
2020	GB	15	3	23	8	15	0.0	1	0	0	0	0	0	0	0
2021	GB	16	3	31	15	16	0.0	0	0	0	0	0	0	0	0
Total		59	21	110	59	51	1.5	1	0	0	0	1	1	0	0
Source: pro-football-reference.com

=== Postseason ===
Year	Team	Games		Tackles				Interceptions				Fumbles			
Year	Team	GP	GS	Total	Solo	Ast	Sck	PD	Int	Yds	TD	FF	FR	Yds	TD
2019	GB	2	2	4	3	1	0.0	0	0	0	0	0	0	0	0
2020	GB	2	1	3	1	2	0.0	0	0	0	0	0	0	0	0
2021	GB	1	1	1	1	0	0.0	0	0	0	0	0	0	0	0
Total		5	4	8	5	3	0.0	0	0	0	0	0	0	0	0
Source: pro-football-reference.com
