= Plainfield Public Library District =

Coordinates: 41°36′32.8″N 88°12′12.2″W

Plainfield Library

The Plainfield Public Library District serves residents and businesses of the village of Plainfield, Illinois, United States, and surrounding area. The library district's current population is in excess of 60,000 residents. The library is located at 15025 S. Illinois Street, Plainfield, IL 60544 near crossings of Lincoln Highway and U.S. Route 66

== History ==
In 1925, Ebanezer & Celeste Nimmons left a $25,000 estate to either the Village of Plainfield or to Plainfield Township for the establishment of a tax supported public library. On June 9, 1925 the residents of the Village of Plainfield held a special election to vote on the establishment of a tax supported public library. The Nimmons Village of Plainfield Free Public Library, commonly referred to as the Village Library, creating a tax supported endowed library. The first elected Board of Directors was: Stephen Wylie, Clinton Hartong, Robert Wolfe, Clyde Wolf, Grace Jones-Smith, and Eugenia Hadlock.

The Village Library opened its doors to the public in April 1926, with 784 books. Mrs. Hadlock, who had resigned from the Board of Directors, became the first librarian. For 16 years Nimmons Village of Plainfield Free Public Library was located in a small frame building on a lot on the south side of Lockport Street and consisted of a room approximately 25 x 30 feet divided into a children's corner, a non-fiction corner, and a fiction corner, with study tables in another section.

In 1940, the Library Board purchased a 50' x 132' lot from the Plainfield Congregational Church at 705 N. Illinois Street. The McClester-Nimmons Village of Plainfield Free Public Library opened its doors to the public on June 1, 1941. Mary Pierce Quilhot was the first librarian of the new facility. In 1954, Mrs. Jessie Klett tendered her resignation as the library's second librarian. Miss Thyra Hartong was named the new librarian by the Board in October of that year.

The Library's Board of Trustees, concerned for the growth of the Library, purchased the residence at 709 N. Illinois Street for in 1978. On February 18, 1980, the Board of Trustees purchased the residence at 707 N. Illinois Street.

On August 28, 1990 a tornado struck the Plainfield/Crest Hill area killing 29 people and causing millions of dollars of damage. The tornado destroyed the Grand Prairie Elementary School, the location of the Library District's branch library. Over 10,500 items at the branch library suffered water damage. Volunteers boxed damaged books that were then shipped to Atlanta for drying and preservation. Over 600 boxes of books returned a month later to be stored until the District's building expansion was complete. The boxes were stored at a warehouse in Minooka, Illinois until moved to a storage facility in Plainfield. Following the tornado, the Library District increased its service hours to help the community deal with the loss of two school media centers and the branch library.

After nearly a year, the District was able to settle its August 28, 1990 tornado claim of $84,599.75 with Maryland Casualty Insurance Company. Over 700 books and other items were destroyed. Maryland Casualty compensated the District $20,463.75 for damaged and destroyed materials. M.F. Bank Restoration Company received $64,900 from Maryland Casualty for salvage of 10,500 books. The Library District received $196 from F.E.M.A Federal Emergency Management Agency. The official dedication and grand opening of the District's newly expanded and remodeled Library was held on Sunday, December 8, 1991.

In April 1999, the Library Board began negotiations to purchase the property at 706 N. Division Street. The Library will have the right to purchase the property in August 2010.

In 2000, Plainfield Public Library District Administrative Librarian Barbara Pitney announced her retirement. The Library Board named Sharon Smith, former director of the Coal City Public Library District, Interim Administrator effective June 17, 2000. The Board of Trustees hired Julie M. Milavec as the new Administrative Librarian. Ms. Milavec began her work with the Plainfield Public Library District on November 1, 2000.

Census 2000 figures for the Library District, with official census population certified at 41, 843. New card registrations for 2001 averaged over 300 a month.

In October 2002, the Plainfield Public Library District exercised the right of first refusal for Mrs. Edna Gray's property at 708 N. Division Street. The property was purchased and the existing home on the property was razed. Plans to expand the existing library will not be feasible until the Library acquires the parking lot at 706 N. Division Street in 2010.

== Notes ==
Board of Trustees, Nimmons Library By-Laws of the Board of Trustees of the Nimmons Library June 15, 1925
Pitney, Barbara History of the Plainfield Public Library Plainfield Public Library, Local History Files.
Beaird, Tina Black Sky: Plainfield Tornado August 23, 1990 Illinois, 2005
Collected newspaper clippings Plainfield Enterprise
Plainfield Historical Society A History of Plainfield Then and Now Plainfield, Illinois 1977
