= Flanders House (Plainfield, Illinois) =

Historic house in Illinois, United States

- U.S. National Register of Historic Places
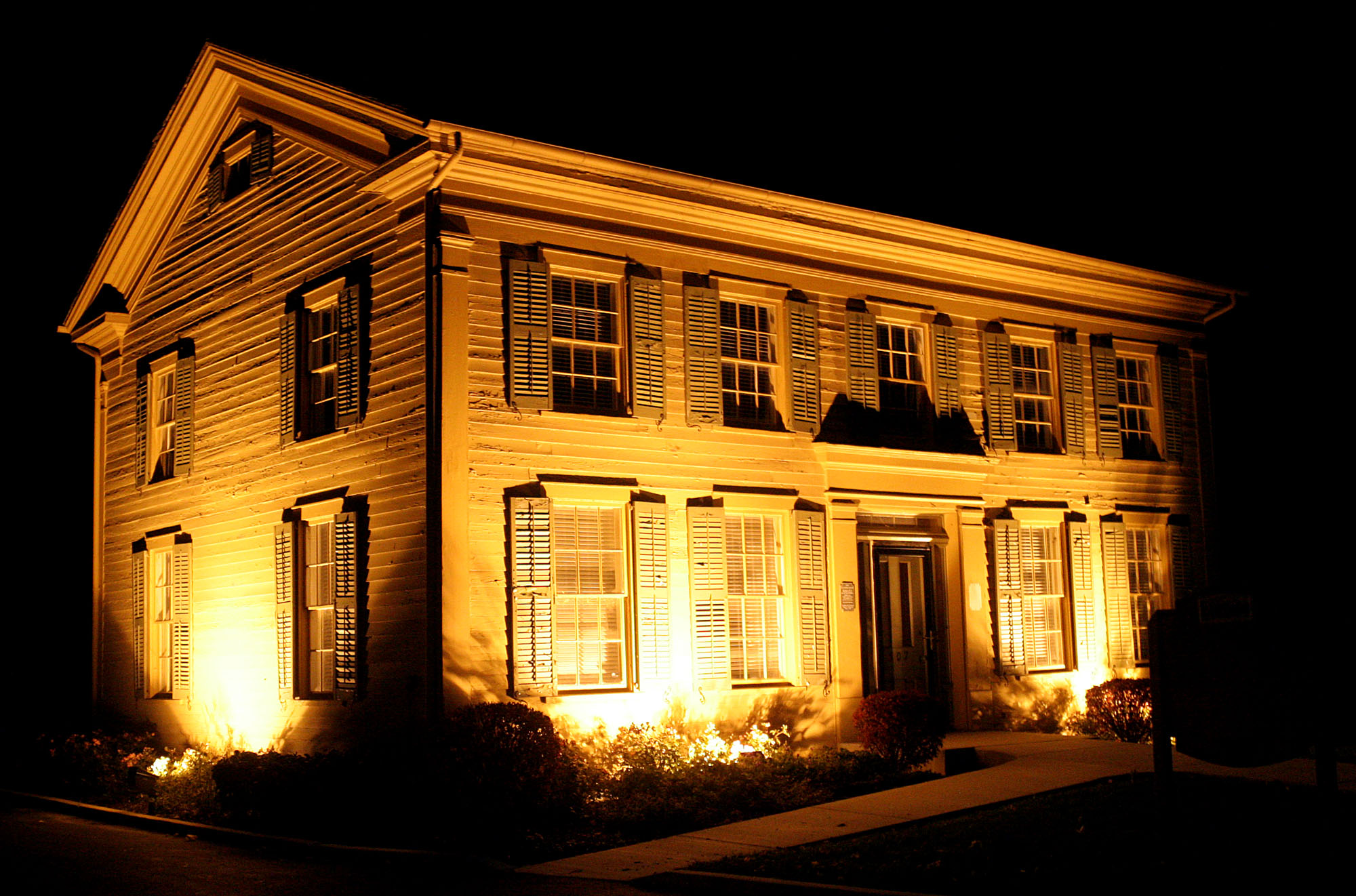

- Location within Illinois Location within the United States
- Location: 405 West Main Street; Plainfield, Will County, Illinois, U.S.
- Coordinates: 41°36′45″N 88°12′10″W
- Built: 1841
- Architectural style: Federal Style & Greek Revival
- NRHP reference No.: 91001688
- Added to NRHP: November 14, 1991

The Flanders House is a historic residence in Plainfield, Illinois.

== History ==
Plainfield was first settled by James Walker in 1829, who later contributed to a sawmill on the DuPage River. This mill brought new settlers to the region, creating Will County's first permanent community. The new settlement was also halfway down the Chicago to Ottawa stagecoach line, stimulating commercial development. Jason R. Flanders immigrated from Boston, Massachusetts to Troy Township. He farmed his land for eight years before moving to Plainfield in 1840. Flanders was apparently active in the local lumber trade and provided timber for the construction of frame buildings in town.

There is no record of the house ever being used for any non-residential purpose, but it may have served travelers in a manner similar to the nearby Plainfield Halfway House. It would have been odd for a building the size of the Flanders House to not take advantage of the stagecoach line. Little is known about Flanders, other than that he was the first constable of Plainfield. By the time of his death, he had amassed a 300-acre (120 ha) land holding. The three surviving Flanders children received a one-third share in the building.

Only two buildings remain in Plainfield that were constructed before the Flanders House. The house was sold to the Peace Lutheran Church in 1974 and converted to a parsonage. The church sold in 1990 and restored to its 1841 appearance. The house was listed on the National Register of Historic Places on November 14, 1991.
