= Plainfield Central High School =

Plainfield High School - Central Campus
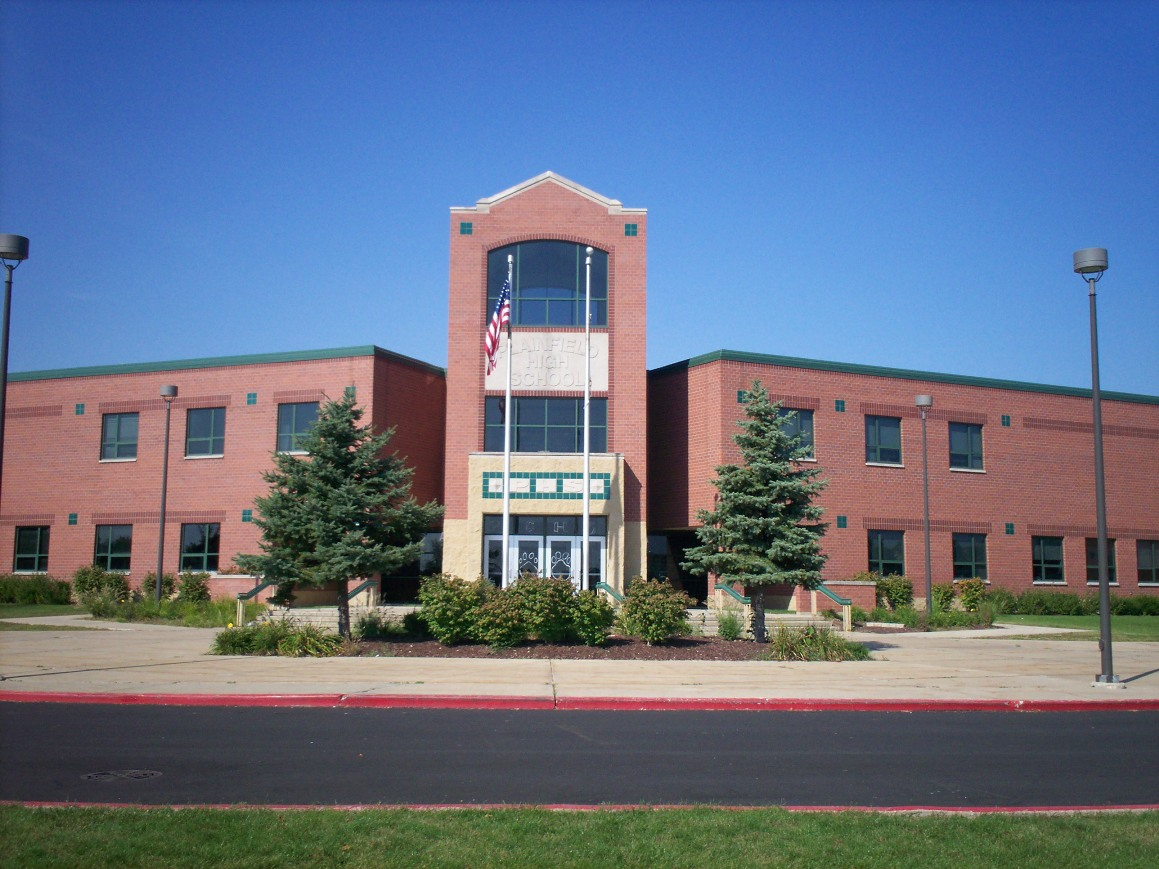

Location
- 24120 West Fort Beggs Drive; Plainfield, Illinois 60544; United States
- 41°36′08″N 88°12′23″W

Information
- School type: Public High School
- Established: 1959
- School district: Plainfield Community Consolidated School District 202
- Superintendent: Glenn Wood
- Principal: Chris Chlebek
- Teaching staff: 122.90 (FTE)
- Grades: 9–12
- Gender: Coed
- Enrollment: 1,986 (2022-23)
- Average class size: 23
- Student to teacher ratio: 16.16
- Campus type: Suburban
- Colors: Forest green White
- Song: Alma Mater
- Fight song: "When the Cats Begin to Fight"
- Athletics conference: Southwest Prairie Conference
- Mascot: Willy
- Team name: Wildcats Lady Wildcats
- Newspaper: The Fielder
- Yearbook: The Plainsman
- Website: pchs.psd202.org/o/pchs

Plainfield High School - Central Campus, or PHS-CC, is a four-year public high school in Plainfield, Illinois, a southwest suburb of Chicago, Illinois, in the United States. It is part of Plainfield Community Consolidated School District 202, which also includes three other high schools: Plainfield South High School, Plainfield North High School and Plainfield East High School.

== Campus history ==
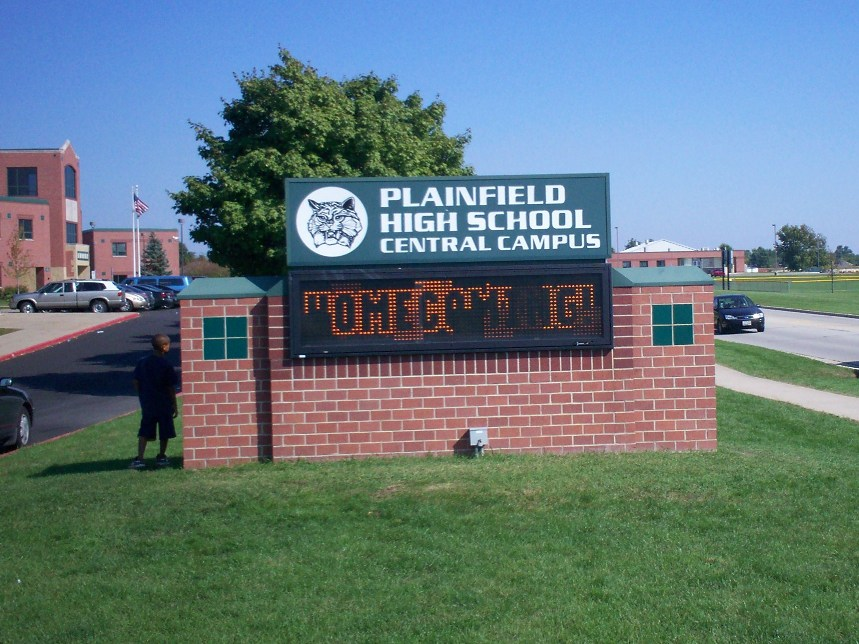
PHSCC Welcome Sign

The original building was destroyed by one of the worst tornadoes in Illinois history. The Plainfield Tornado, which was rated an F5, struck the town on August 28, 1990, one day before classes were scheduled to begin. Three faculty and staff members lost their lives during this storm. Had school been in session, casualties could have been even more grave, as the tornado hit the school directly. In the middle of the 1992–1993 school year students moved into the new PHS building. At the time, it was one of the most technically advanced high schools in the state of Illinois, complete with its own observatory.

In 1998, the school added a "Freshman Center" with its own gymnasium and cafeteria. The new freshman center has three floors and is connected to the main building by an enclosed catwalk. At the start of the 2024-2025 school year, it was renamed the "North Building".

In 2005, the school constructed a new snack building and restrooms on the south end of the football–track stadium. In 2007, a new home grandstand was constructed, replacing the visitors' seating on the west side of the football field, and the former home grandstand was converted into visitor seating. The new home grandstand was built using only steel, contrasting with the former home seating which was constructed of brick and concrete. The grandstand opening had been planned for the pre-season 'Green and White Night' event, but construction set-backs led to its opening about one month late.

With the addition of a larger home grandstand, shot put and discus fields were relocated further west, behind the new grandstand.

Also in 2007, the faculty installed over 300 high-resolution wireless cameras to monitor the campus. New computer security measures were implemented which block some internet proxy servers, game-related sites, and other sites that the school district felt distracted their students from the educational process.

The school replaced all its computers and monitors with Dell computers with LCD screens. In the 2008-2009 school year, classroom projectors that could display what was on the current teacher's computer were installed.

On June 9, 2008, severe weather resulted in damage to the tennis court fences and school roof. Although this occurred during a prolonged tornado outbreak throughout the United States, there were no confirmed reports of a tornado.

== Athletics & Activities ==
=== Athletics ===
Plainfield Central competes in the Southwest Prairie Conference and is a member of the Illinois High School Association. The school fields teams in the following sports during the following seasons.

- Fall: Boys & Girls Cross Country, Boys Football, Boys & Girls Golf, Boys Soccer, Girls Swimming & Diving, Girls Tennis, Girls Volleyball
- Winter: Boys & Girls Basketball, Boys & Girls Bowling, Boys Swimming & Diving, Boys Wrestling, Competitive Cheerleading, Competitive Dance, Hockey
- Spring: Boys Baseball, Boys Tennis, Boys Track & Field, Boys Volleyball, Girls Badminton, Girls Softball, Girls Soccer, Girls Track & Field, Boys and Girls Lacrosse

Despite being able to trace its existence back to 1891, Plainfield Central has never won a team state championship.

==== Hall of Fame ====
In the spring of 1998, the high school established its athletic hall of fame to honor athletes, coaches, boosters, and fans who have made significant contributions to the athletic programs. The first class was inducted in 1999.

Year	Inductee	Contribution
1999	Tom Baker	Coach
1999	Kathy Kazmar	Coach
1999	Karen Roppa	Coach
1999	Clyde Avery	Athlete
1999	Scott Davis	Athlete
1999	John Ivlow	Athlete
1999	Mike Miller	Athlete
1999	Dave Needham	Athlete
1999	Carol Markwell	Volunteer
1999	James Ciarlette	Athlete
1937 Football Team
2000	Kathy Cartwright	Coach
2000	Chuck Harris	Administration
2000	Ben Bates	Athlete
2000	Laurie Watters	Athlete
2001	Chris Priest	Athlete
2001	Jenny (Larson) Smeets	Athlete
2002	Carol Bragg	Athlete
2003	Michael Zbacnik	Coach
2004	Gene Fassiotto	Fan/Booster
2004	Don Martin	Coach
2004	Laura Nier	Athlete
2005	1982 Girls Volleyball Team	
2006	Nate Fox	Athlete
2006	Cody Salter	Athlete
2007	Steve Riederer	Coach
2007	Dave Cassetto	Athlete
2007	Teresa Coccaro-Keniley	Athlete
2007	Chris Traversa	Athlete
2007	1953 Football Team	
2008	1983 Softball Team	
2009	Dave Stephens	Coach
2010	2000 Football team	
