= Romeoville High School =

Location
- 100 N Independence Blvd. Romeoville, Illinois; United States; 41.62765°N 88.08255°W

Information
- Type: Public Secondary
- Established: 1963
- School district: Valley View Community Unit School District 365U
- Superintendent: Teresa Polson
- Principal: Derek Kinder
- Faculty: 198
- Teaching staff: 143.90 (FTE)
- Grades: 9th through 12th
- Gender: Coed
- Enrollment: 1,850 (2023-2024)
- Student to teacher ratio: 12.86
- Campus type: Suburban
- Colors: Navy Blue, White, Orange
- Athletics conference: Southwest Prairie Conference
- Mascot: Spartan
- Nickname: Spartans
- Accreditation: Illinois State Board of Education
- Newspaper: The Spartus
- Website: Romeoville High School

Romeoville High School, or The Ville, is a public four-year high school located in Romeoville, Illinois, a southwest suburb of Chicago, Illinois, in the United States. Romeoville High School is one of two high schools in the Valley View Community Unit School District 365U.

Romeoville High School is located in northern Will County, Illinois, about 30 miles southwest of downtown Chicago and about seven miles north of Joliet, Illinois, along Illinois Routes 7, 53, and 171. The Des Plaines River runs through the community, as part of the Illinois-Michigan Canal.

== History ==
The high school opened in 1963 as Lockport West High School allowing students to attend locally instead of traveling to Lockport Township High School. Lockport West's school colors were navy blue and white. Orange was added when the school renamed to Romeoville High School in 1971.

== Athletics ==
Romeoville competes in the Southwest Prairie Conference (SPC) and is a member of the Illinois High School Association (IHSA); the organization which governs most sports and competitive activities for high schools in the state. Teams are stylized as the Spartans.

Athletics at Romeoville High School include badminton, baseball, basketball, bowling, cheerleading, cross country, football, golf, gymnastics, pom poms, soccer, softball, tennis, track and field, volleyball, wrestling, marching band, competition choir, scholastic bowl, and color guard. The school is part of a boys hockey club that is a combination of high schools in Lockport, Lemont, and Bolingbrook.

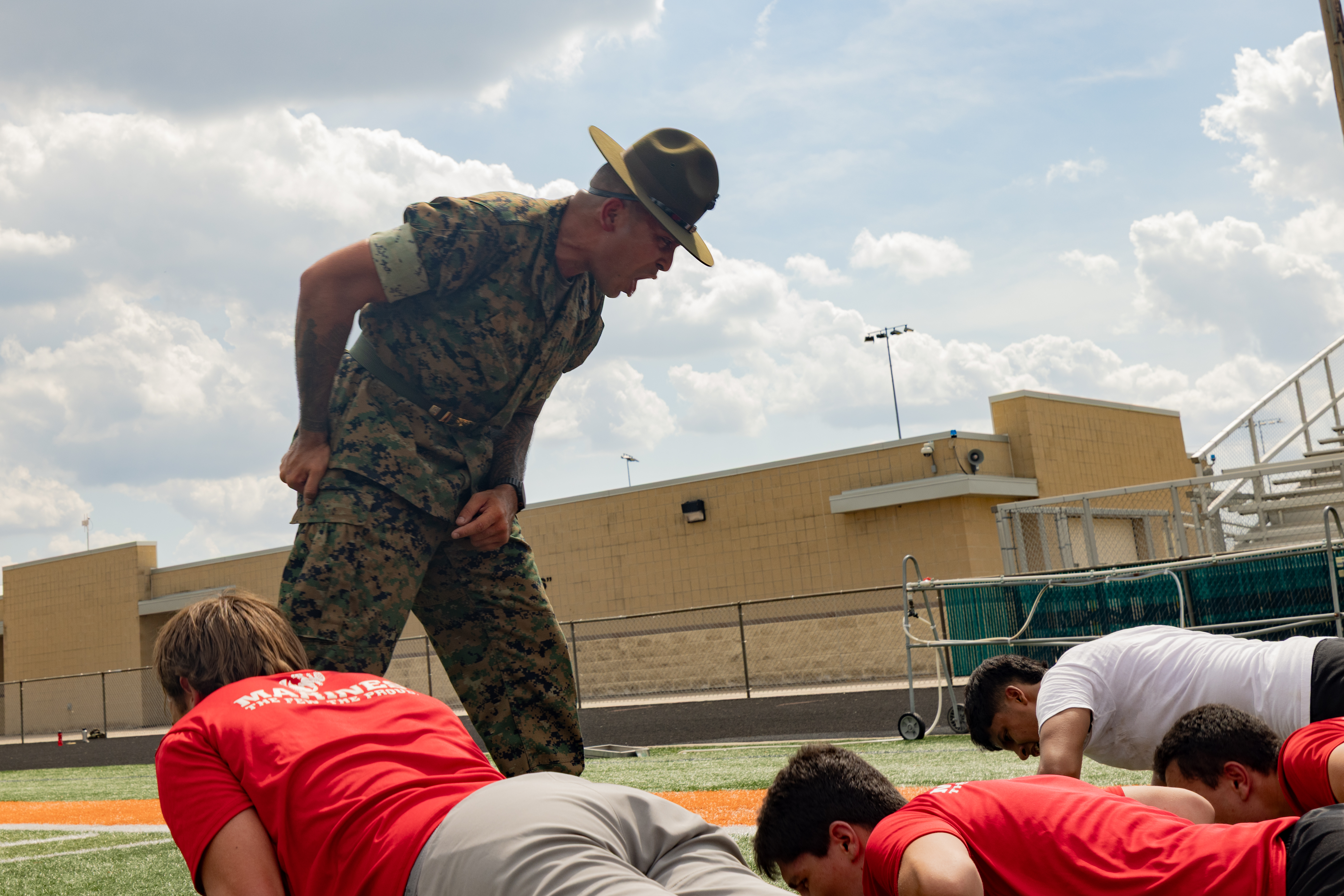
U.S. Marine Corps Sgt. Rasheed Awyan instructs poolees at Romeoville High School during Marine Week Chicago, July 10, 2025, in celebration of the Corps’ 250th anniversary.
