= Bolingbrook High School =

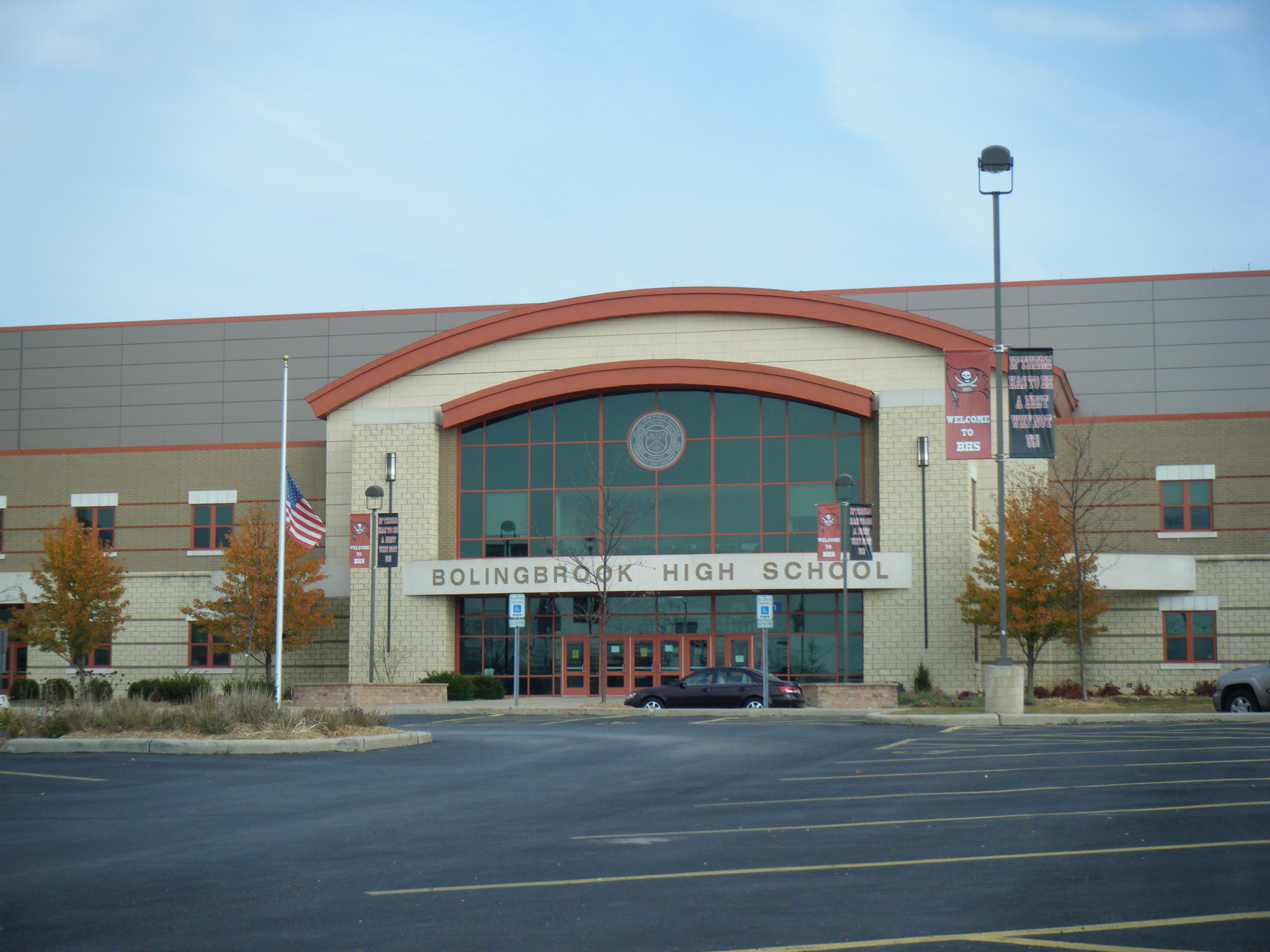

Location
- 365 Raider Way; Bolingbrook, Illinois 60440; United States; 41°41′19.7592″N 88°5′21.7673″W

Information
- Type: Public Secondary
- Motto: Honor Bolingbrook. Honor the Raiders.
- Established: 1974; 52 years ago
- School district: Valley View Community Unit School District 365U
- Superintendent: Teresa Polson
- Principal: Jason Pascavage
- Faculty: 394
- Teaching staff: 246.60 (FTE)
- Grades: 9-12
- Gender: Coed
- Enrollment: 3,298 (2024-2025)
- Student to teacher ratio: 13.37
- Campus type: Suburban
- Color: Red Black White
- Athletics conference: Southwest Prairie Conference
- Nickname: Raiders
- Accreditation: Illinois State Board of Education
- Newspaper: Raider Review
- Website: bhs.vvsd.org

Bolingbrook High School or The Brook is a public four-year high school located in Bolingbrook, Illinois, a southwest suburb of Chicago, Illinois, in the United States. Bolingbrook High School is one of two high schools in the Valley View Community Unit School District 365U.

Bolingbrook High School is located in northern Will County, Illinois, about 30 miles southwest of downtown Chicago and approximately 15 miles north of Joliet, Illinois, along major highways including I-55, I-355, and Illinois Route 53. The DuPage River runs through the community, as part of the Illinois-Michigan Canal.

== History ==
The original Bolingbrook High School campus, which opened in 1974, was located on Lee Lane and Blair Lane within the village. The former campus is now known as Brooks Middle School. Continued community growth prompted the passage of an April 2002 referendum for a new high school located at Schmidt Road and Lily Cache Lane, which opened in August 2004.

== Academics ==
Bolingbrook was ranked as "recognized" nationally and 92 in Illinois in the U.S. News & World Report 2017 best high school rankings.

== Demographics ==
The demographic breakdown of the 3,298 students enrolled for the 2024-2025 school year was:

- Male - 51.3%
- Female - 48.7%
- Native American/Alaskan - 0.1%
- Asian/Pacific Islander - 7.2%
- Black - 24.7%
- Hispanic - 47.9%
- White - 14.0%
- Two or More Races - 5.6%

53.2% of students were eligible for free or reduced-price lunch. This is a Title I school.

== Athletics ==
The Bolingbrook Raiders are members of the Southwest Prairie Conference (SPC). The school colors are red, black and white. The following Illinois High School Association (IHSA) sanctioned sports are offered:

- Badminton (girls)
- Baseball (boys)
- Basketball (girls and boys)
  - Girls state champion - 2006, 2009, 2010, 2011
  - 3rd Place - 2020
- Bowling (girls and boys)
- Competitive cheerleading - (girls)
- Competitive dance (girls)
- Cross country (girls and boys)
- Football (boys)
  - State champions - 2011
- Flag Football (girls)
- Golf (girls and boys)
- Gymnastics (girls)
- Soccer (girls and boys)
- Softball (girls)
- Swimming and diving (girls and boys)
- Tennis (girls and boys)
- Track and field (girls and boys)
- Volleyball (girls and boys)
- Wrestling (boys)

== Notable alumni ==
- Dagmara Avelar, current Illinois State Representative for Illinois’ 85th District
- Kenneth Boatright, former NFL defensive end
- Tuf Borland, former NFL linebacker, assistant coach for Wisconsin
- Troy Doris - Olympic triple jumper; competed at 2016 Summer Olympics in Rio
- Robert Farmer - former NFL running back
- J.J. Furmaniak - former MLB infielder
- Anthony Herron - former NFL defensive end, current football analyst for Big Ten Network
- Cameron Mitchell - NFL cornerback for the Indianapolis Colts
- Dashaun Mallory - former NFL defensive tackle
- Ariel Massengale - assistant coach for SIU Edwardsville Cougars women's basketball
- Susana Mendoza - current Illinois Comptroller
- Tyler Mitchem – volleyball player on the United States men's national volleyball team.
- Ben Moore - professional basketball player in Turkey
- Antonio Morrison - former NFL linebacker
- Brodric Thomas - shooting guard for Ontario Clippers of the NBA G League
- Morgan Tuck - former WNBA player, general manager of WNBA’s Houston Comets
- Greg Williams - assistant coach for NFL's Green Bay Packers
- John Williams - NFL offensive lineman for the Green Bay Packers
- Steve Williams - former NFL defensive end
