= Steve Williams (defensive lineman, born 1981) =

American gridiron football player (born 1981)

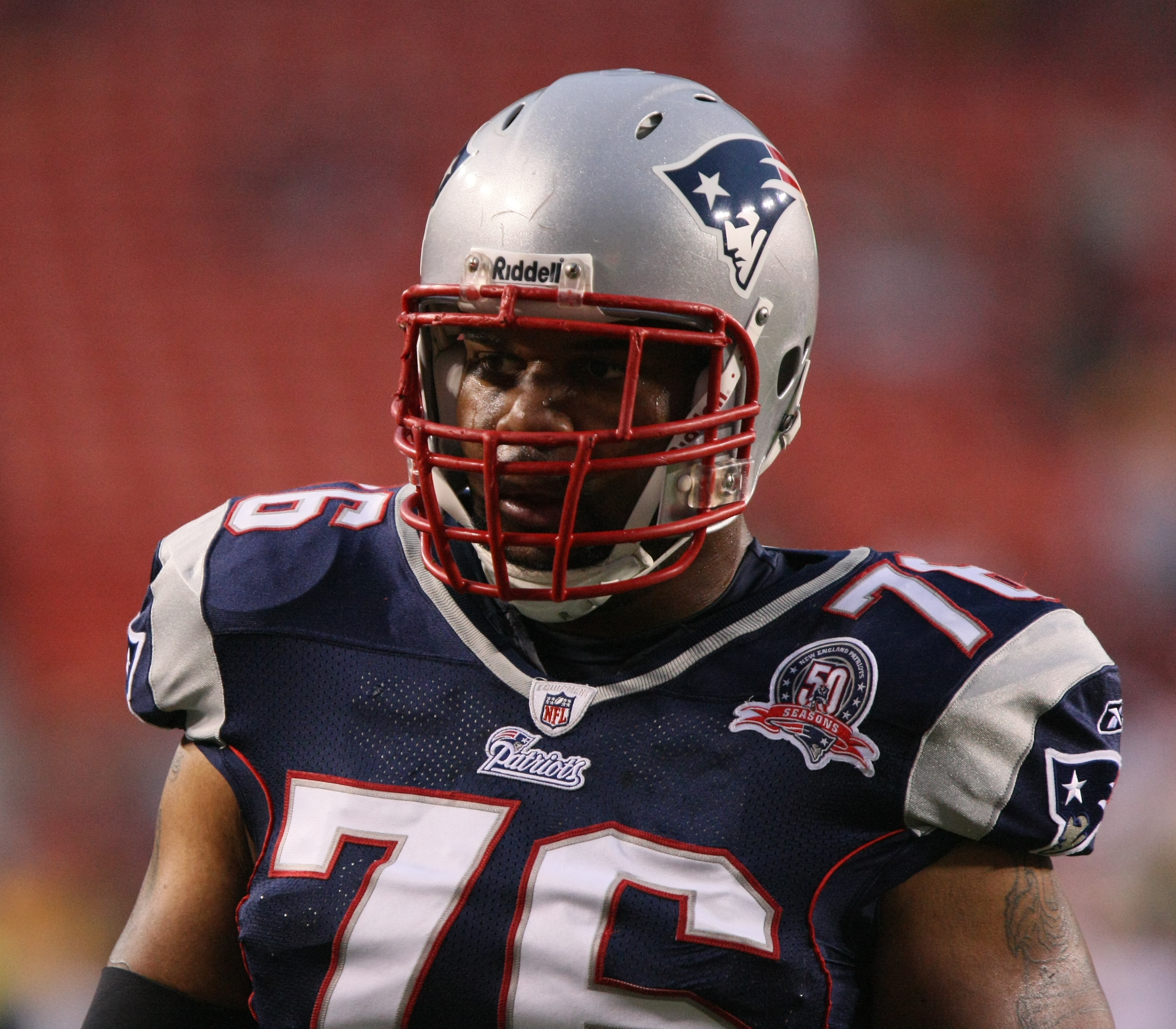
- Williams during an August 28, 2009 preseason game against the Washington Redskins.

No. 70, 93
- Positions: Defensive end, defensive tackle

Personal information
- Born: September 21, 1981 (age 45); Oak Park, Illinois, U.S.
- Listed height: 6 ft 2 in (1.88 m)
- Listed weight: 300 lb (136 kg)

Career information
- High school: Bolingbrook (Bolingbrook, Illinois)
- College: Northwest Missouri State
- NFL draft: 2006: undrafted

Career history
- Kansas City Chiefs (2006); Carolina Panthers (2007–2008)*; New England Patriots (2009)*; BC Lions (2009–2010); New England Patriots (2011)*
- * Offseason or practice squad member only

Career NFL statistics
- Tackles: 4
- Stats at Pro Football Reference

Stephen Cabot Williams (born September 21, 1981) is a former professional gridiron football defensive end. He was signed by the Kansas City Chiefs as an undrafted free agent in 2006. He played college football at Northwest Missouri State.

Williams has also been a member of the Carolina Panthers, New England Patriots, and BC Lions.

== Early life ==
Williams attended Bolingbrook High School in Bolingbrook, Illinois, where he earned all-state honors in football and was a state champion in wrestling.

== College career ==
After graduating from Bolingbrook High School, Williams attended Indiana University, where he played in 10 games as a freshman in 2000, recording 10 tackles. In his 2001 sophomore season, Williams had one sack and 17 tackles in 11 games played. He transferred to Northern Illinois University in 2002 but did not play. He returned to play football in 2004 with Northwest Missouri State University, where he was a first-team All-MIAA selection with 52 tackles. In 2005, he appeared in five games and recorded 31 tackles.

== Professional career ==
=== Kansas City Chiefs ===
After going undrafted in the 2006 NFL draft, Williams signed with the Kansas City Chiefs on May 17, 2006. He was released by the Chiefs following final cuts on September 2 and re-signed to their practice squad two days later. He was promoted to the Chiefs' 53-man roster on September 28 and released from it on November 16. He returned to the practice squad on November 20 and to the 53-man roster on November 28, where he spent the remainder of the season. He finished the 2006 season with four tackles in 11 games played. He was released by the Chiefs on February 21, 2007.

=== Carolina Panthers ===
Williams was signed by the Carolina Panthers on March 16, 2007. He was placed on the team's injured reserve list on September 1, and released from it five days later with an injury settlement. He was re-signed by the Panthers following the season on April 7, 2008. He was again released by the team on August 30, 2008.

=== New England Patriots ===
After spending the 2008 season out of football, Williams was signed by the New England Patriots on May 4, 2009. He was waived on September 4, 2009.

=== BC Lions ===
Williams signed with the BC Lions of the Canadian Football League on September 22, 2009. After spending parts of two seasons with the club, he was released on January 28, 2011.

=== Return to New England ===
The Patriots re-signed Williams on July 29, 2011. He was waived on August 13.
