= John Ivlow =

American football player (born 1970)

Profile
- Position: Running back

Personal information
- Born: January 26, 1970 (age 56); Joliet, Illinois, U.S.
- Listed height: 5 ft 11 in (1.80 m)
- Listed weight: 226 lb (103 kg)

Career information
- High school: Plainfield
- College: Colorado State
- NFL draft: 1993: undrafted

Career history
- Chicago Bears (1993); San Francisco 49ers (1993-1994)*; Denver Broncos (1995)*
- * Offseason or practice squad member only

Awards and highlights
- Super Bowl champion (XXIX)
- Stats at Pro Football Reference

John Ivlow (born January 26, 1970, in Joliet, Illinois) is an American former professional football player who was a running back in the National Football League (NFL). He played college football for the Northwestern Wildcats and Colorado State Rams, and played in NFL two games for the Chicago Bears in 1993. Ivlow had also played with the Denver Broncos and San Francisco 49ers. Ivlow went on to win the Super Bowl with the 49ers. Ivlow was the head football coach of the Bolingbrook High School Raiders compiling a 159-64 Record (.713%) in 21 seasons. Ivlow and the Raiders went on to win the class 8A state championship in 2011. Ivlow was inducted into the Illinois HS football Coaches Association hall of fame in 2023. Ivlow is currently retired from coaching and a retired local law enforcement agent (Bolingbrook).

== Career Record by Year ==
Year Head Coach Record

- 2022 J. Ivlow 7-3-0
- 2021 J. Ivlow 7-3-0
- 2020 J. Ivlow 4-2-0 *Shortened Covid Season in IL
- 2019 J. Ivlow 8-4-0
- 2018 J. Ivlow 7-3-0 Conference Champion
- 2017 J. Ivlow 7-3-0
- 2016 J. Ivlow 4-5-0
- 2015 J. Ivlow 5-5-0
- 2014 J. Ivlow 8-4-0
- 2013 J. Ivlow 10-1-0 Conference Champions
- 2012 J. Ivlow 8-3-0
- 2011 J. Ivlow 13-1-0 State Champions
- 2010 J. Ivlow 5-5-0
- 2009 J. Ivlow 9-2-0 Conference Champions
- 2008 J. Ivlow 10-1-0 Conference Champions
- 2007 J. Ivlow 8-3-0 Conference Champions
- 2006 J. Ivlow 9-3-0
- 2005 J. Ivlow 9-3-0
- 2004 J. Ivlow 5-5-0
- 2003 J. Ivlow 9-2-0
- 2002 J. Ivlow 7-3-0
