= Plainfield East High School =

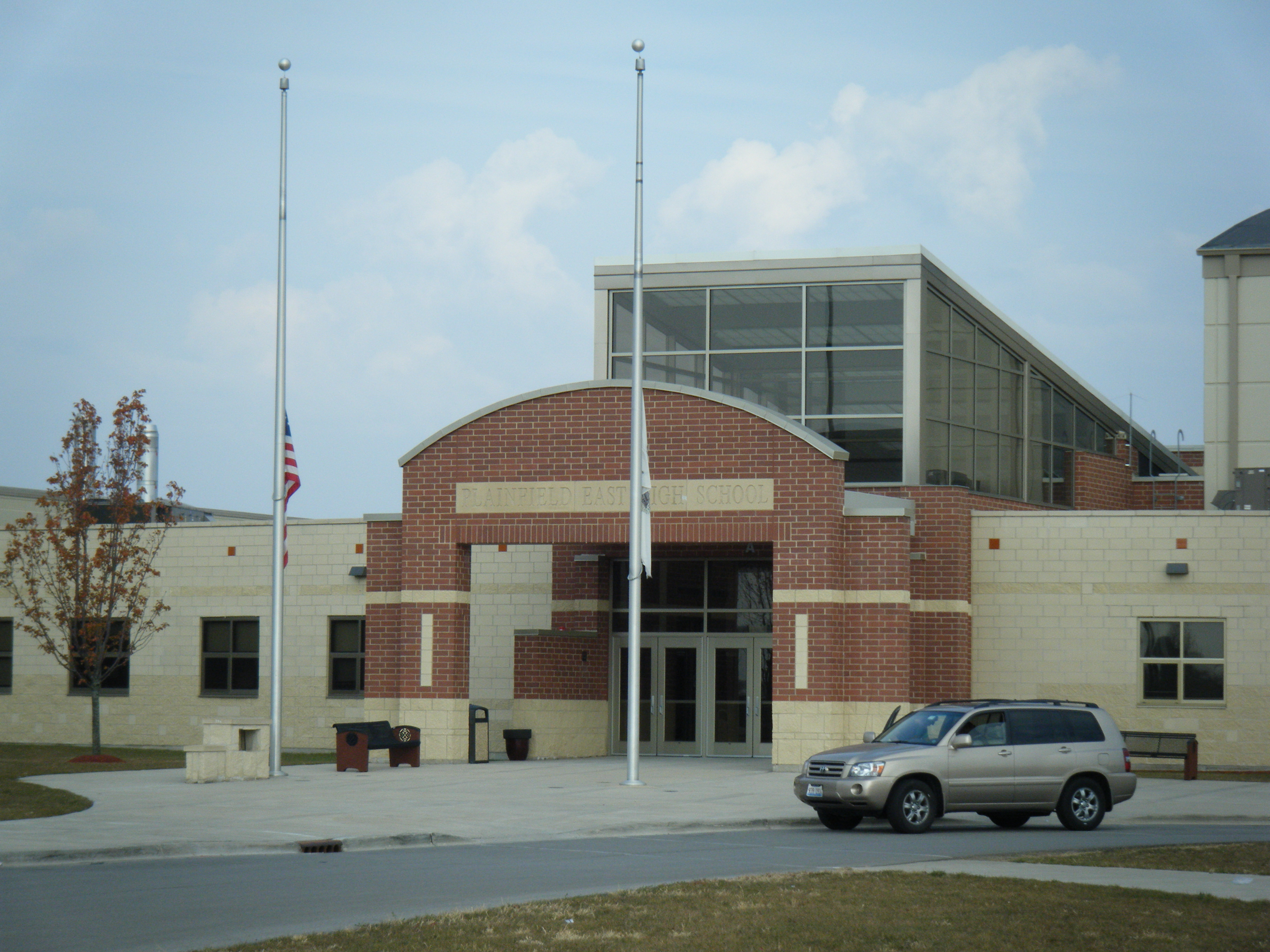

Location
- 12001 S. Naperville Road; Plainfield, Illinois 60585; United States; 41°39′44.189″N 88°10′29.131″W

Information
- School type: Public Secondary
- Motto: It's Best To Be A Bengal and Have a Great Bengal Day, Roar!
- Established: 2008
- School district: Plainfield Community Consolidated School District 202
- Superintendent: Glenn Wood
- Principal: Joseph O'Brien
- Teaching staff: 113.20 (on an FTE basis)
- Grades: 9–12
- Gender: Coed
- Enrollment: 1,868 (2023-2024)
- Average class size: 22
- Student to teacher ratio: 16.50
- Campus type: Suburban
- Colors: Orange; Green
- Slogan: Have A Great Bengal Day
- Athletics conference: Southwest Prairie Conference
- Team name: Bengals
- Website: pehs.psd202.org

Plainfield East High School, or PEHS is a four-year public high school located in Plainfield, Illinois, a southwest suburb of Chicago, Illinois, in the United States. It is part of the Plainfield Community Consolidated School District 202, which also includes three other high schools: Plainfield Central High School, Plainfield South High School, and Plainfield North High School.

== History ==
The fourth high school in the Plainfield Community Consolidated School District 202 opened its doors for the very first time for the 2008-2009 academic school year on August 21, 2008. The school's first year only contained freshmen and sophomores. Each year, the school added another grade level. By the 2010-2011 school year, the school was finally operating with all four years (freshmen-seniors).

== Athletics & activities ==
=== Athletics ===
Plainfield East competes in the Southwest Prairie Conference and is a member of the Illinois High School Association. The school fields teams in the following sports during the following seasons.

- Fall: Boys & Girls Cross Country, Boys Football, Boys & Girls Golf, Boys Soccer, Girls Swimming & Diving, Girls Tennis, Girls Volleyball
- Winter: Boys & Girls Basketball, Boys & Girls Bowling, Boys Swimming & Diving, Boys Wrestling, Competitive Cheerleading, Competitive Dance
- Spring: Boys Baseball, Boys Tennis, Boys Track & Field, Boys Volleyball, Girls Badminton, Girls Softball, Girls Soccer, Girls Track & Field

The baseball team won the IHSA State Championship in 2020–21.

=== Band ===
The band has many types of bands including standard concert band, marching band, jazz band, pep band, madrigal brass and recorders, percussion ensemble, and musical pit in the spring.

==== Marching Band ====
Since its inception, the marching band has always been semi-competitive, attending competitions which included Pontiac Indian Showdown, Wheaton North, Chicagoland Marching Band Festival, Providence Catholic Marching Band Invitational, and Victor J. Andrew High School Marching Band Invitational. During the preseason of the 2015 season, it was decided that the marching band was to be split into a competitive and a curricular band, with the competitive band going to compete at Amos Alonzo Stagg High School and Downers Grove South High School annual preliminary marching competition making finals in the latter. The 2017-2018 year had become a curricular requirement for being in marching band.

== Notable alumni ==
- Andrew Hoffmann, MLB pitcher for the Kansas City Royals
- Tyler Lancaster, NFL player
