= Kapri Bibbs =

American football player (born 1993)

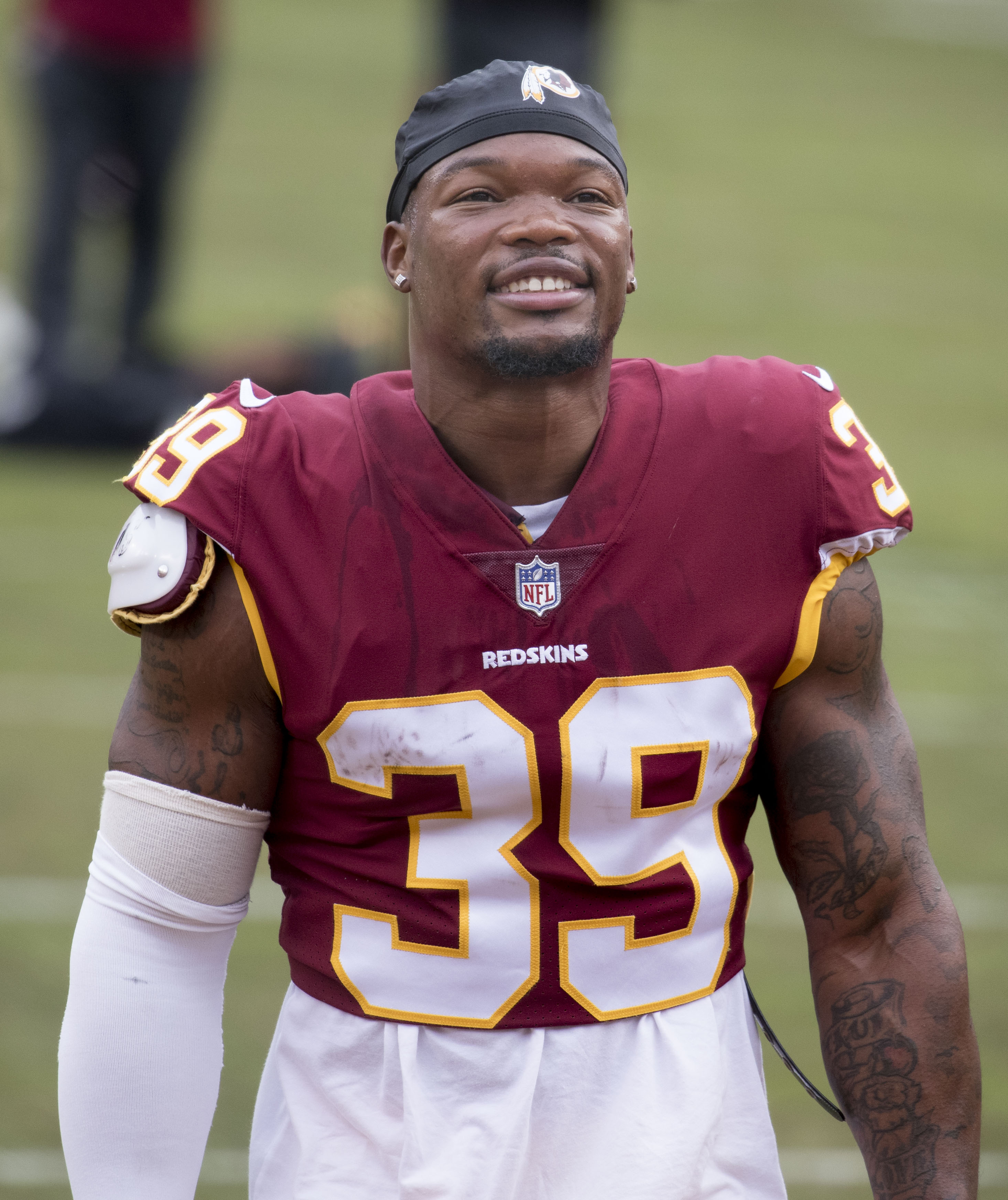
- Bibbs with the Washington Redskins in 2017

No. 35, 39, 46, 22
- Position: Running back

Personal information
- Born: January 10, 1993 (age 33); Harvey, Illinois, U.S.
- Listed height: 5 ft 10 in (1.78 m)
- Listed weight: 203 lb (92 kg)

Career information
- High school: Plainfield North (Plainfield, Illinois)
- College: Snow (2011); Colorado State (2013)
- NFL draft: 2014: undrafted

Career history
- Denver Broncos (2014–2016); San Francisco 49ers (2017)*; Washington Redskins (2017–2018); Green Bay Packers (2018)
- * Offseason or practice squad member only

Awards and highlights
- Super Bowl champion (50)

Career NFL statistics
- Rushing yards: 511
- Rushing touchdowns: 7
- Receptions: 32
- Receiving yards: 318
- Receiving touchdowns: 3
- Stats at Pro Football Reference

Kapri Lashaw Bibbs (born January 10, 1993) is an American former professional football player who was a running back in the National Football League (NFL). He played college football for the Colorado State Rams, and was signed by the Denver Broncos as an undrafted free agent in 2014. He was also a member of the San Francisco 49ers, Washington Redskins, and Green Bay Packers.

== Early life ==
Bibbs attended and played high school football at Plainfield North High School (IL) for the Tigers.

== College career ==
Bibbs attended Snow College in 2011 and Front Range Community College in 2012. Before the 2013 season, he transferred to Colorado State. In his only season with the school, he rushed for a school record 1,741 yards and joined Barry Sanders and Montee Ball as the only players in NCAA history to rush for 30 touchdowns in a season. His 2013 season garnered him among the leaders in various rushing categories in the Mountain West Conference.

Bibbs entered the 2014 NFL draft after his sophomore season.

== Professional career ==
Pre-draft measurables
Height	Weight	Arm length	Hand span	40-yard dash	10-yard split	20-yard split	20-yard shuttle	Three-cone drill	Vertical jump	Broad jump	Bench press
5 ft 9 3/8 in (1.76 m)	212 lb (96 kg)	31 3/8 in (0.80 m)	8 1/2 in (0.22 m)	4.54 s	1.53 s	2.62 s	4.61 s	7.50 s	29.0 in (0.74 m)	8 ft 10 in (2.69 m)	24 reps

=== Denver Broncos ===
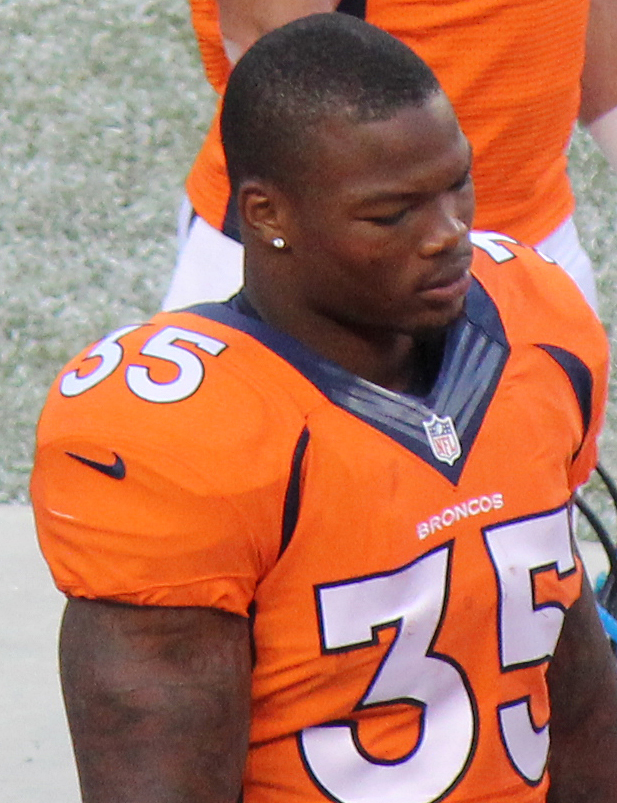
Bibbs in 2014

Bibbs was not selected in the 2014 NFL Draft, but was signed by the Denver Broncos as a free agent. He was signed to the team's practice squad for the 2014 season. He was released in November and tried out with the Arizona Cardinals, but was ultimately re-signed to the Broncos' practice squad.

Bibbs was once again placed on the practice squad by the Broncos prior to the 2015 season. He was promoted to the active roster in October following an injury to Juwan Thompson. He was active for the game against the Cleveland Browns, but did not receive any carries. The day after the game, he was once again released; however, he was re-signed to the practice squad two days later.

On February 7, 2016, Bibbs was part of the Broncos team that won Super Bowl 50, defeating the Carolina Panthers 24–10.

On November 6, 2016, on Sunday Night Football, Bibbs made a 69-yard catch and ran for his first career touchdown against their AFC West rival Oakland Raiders. He suffered a high ankle sprain in Week 13 and was placed on injured reserve on December 5, 2016. Overall, he finished the 2016 season with 129 rushing yards to go along with two receptions for 75 yards and a touchdown.

=== San Francisco 49ers ===
On April 29, 2017, the Broncos traded Bibbs and a 2017 fifth round draft pick to the San Francisco 49ers for a fourth round draft pick in 2018. He was waived on September 1, 2017.

=== Washington Redskins ===
On November 24, 2017, Bibbs was signed to the Washington Redskins' practice squad. He was promoted on the active roster on December 12, 2017. In his first game as a Redskin, he caught a screen pass from Kirk Cousins then scrambled for a 36-yard touchdown against the Arizona Cardinals. He finished the 2017 season with 79 rushing yards to go along with 14 receptions for 128 yards and a receiving touchdown.

On September 1, 2018, Bibbs was waived for final roster cuts before the start of the regular season, but signed to the team's practice squad the following day. He was promoted to the active roster on September 22, 2018. In Week 5, against the New Orleans Saints, he scored his first rushing touchdown as a Redskin. He was waived on December 15, 2018.

=== Green Bay Packers ===
On December 17, 2018, Bibbs was claimed off waivers by the Green Bay Packers following a knee injury suffered by Aaron Jones. He played in two games with the Packers to end the season. He finished the 2018 season with career totals of 103 rushing yards, three rushing touchdowns, 16 receptions, 115 receiving yards, and one receiving touchdown.

On June 14, 2019, Bibbs was released by the Packers. He was suspended one week by the NFL on November 8, 2019. He was reinstated from suspension on November 12.

== NFL career statistics ==
Regular season statistics
Year	Team	Games		Rushing					Receiving					Fumbles	
Year	Team	GP	GS	Att	Yds	Avg	Lng	TD	Rec	Yds	Avg	Lng	TD	Fum	Lost
2016	DEN	12	0	29	129	4.4	24	0	2	75	37.5	69	1	0	0
2017	WAS	3	0	21	79	3.8	16	0	14	128	9.1	36	1	0	0
2018	WAS	10	0	20	101	5.1	15	3	13	102	7.8	23	1	1	0
2018	GB	2	0	1	2	2.0	2	0	3	13	4.3	5	0	0	0
Total		27	0	71	311	4.4	24	3	32	318	9.9	69	3	1	0

== See also ==
- List of NCAA major college football yearly rushing leaders
- List of NCAA major college football yearly scoring leaders
