= Plainfield Halfway House =

- U.S. National Register of Historic Places
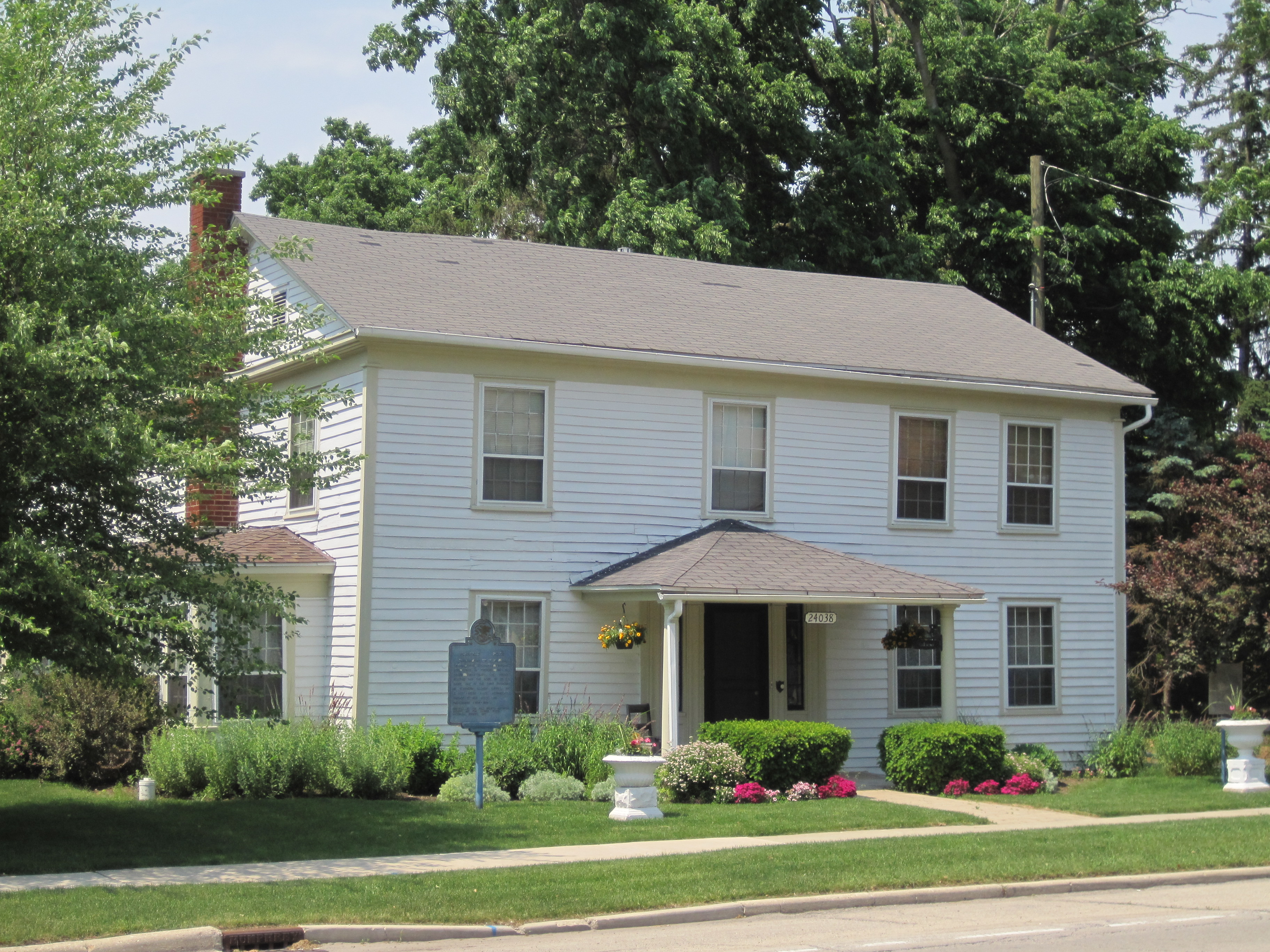
- Plainfield Halfway House in 2011

- Location within Illinois Location within the United States
- Location: 24044 W Main St; Plainfield, Will County, Illinois, United States
- Coordinates: 41°36′41″N 88°12′15″W
- NRHP reference No.: 80001421
- Added to NRHP: September 29, 1980

The Plainfield Halfway House is a historic building in Plainfield, Illinois. Plainfield was first settled in the 1820s by a group seeking to convert the local Pottawatomie to Christianity. Squire L. F. Arnold, the first postmaster of Plainfield, owned the tract of land on which the building stands. In 1834, he built a small building to serve as a post office and a stop for stagecoaches. The property was sold in 1836, and a two-story building was constructed adjacent to the original structure. This new structure operated as a tavern and inn. The inn earned its name by being halfway on the stagecoach line between Chicago and Ottawa. A year later, Dr. Erastus Wight became manager of the establishment, running it until his death in 1845. His son, Dr. Roderick Wight, took over from his father and purchased the building in 1850. He added a one-story addition to the back of the inn later that year.

The inn's large size made it an ideal site to conduct town affairs. It was used as a meeting hall in its early years and became the main location for Plainfield social events. The Plainfield Light Artillery used the building as a headquarters from 1856 until the Civil War. The building ceased to function as an inn starting in 1886, and was converted into a private residence. It was home to the descendants of the Wight family until 1956. The original building that served stagecoach passengers was demolished in the 1940s. The remaining building was added to the National Register of Historic Places on September 29, 1980.
