= Plainfield Community Consolidated School District 202 =

School district in Illinois, United States

Location
- Plainfield, Illinois

District information
- Type: K-12
- Established: 1959
- Superintendent: Glenn Wood

Other information
- Website: www.psd202.org

Plainfield Community Consolidated School District 202 is a public school district located in Illinois. There are four high schools, seven middle schools, seventeen elementary schools, one early learning center, and one alternative school in the district.

The 64-square-mile (170 km^{2}) district is zoned to serve the towns of: Plainfield, Joliet, Crest Hill, Lockport, Bolingbrook, and Romeoville, as well as various parts of unincorporated Will County and Kendall County.

== Early learning center ==
- Bonnie McBeth Early Learning Center

== Elementary schools ==
- Central Elementary School
- Charles Reed Elementary School
- Creekside Elementary School
- Crystal Lawn Elementary School
- Eagle Pointe Elementary School
- Elizabeth Eichelberger Elementary School
- Freedom Elementary School
- Grand Prairie Elementary School
- Lakewood Falls Elementary School
- Liberty Elementary School
- Lincoln Elementary School
- Meadow View Elementary School
- Ridge Elementary School
- River View Elementary School
- Thomas Jefferson Elementary School
- Walkers Grove Elementary School
- Wallin Oaks Elementary School
- Wesmere Elementary School

== Middle schools ==
- Aux Sable Middle School
- Drauden Point Middle School
- Heritage Grove Middle School
- Indian Trail Middle School
- Ira Jones Middle School
- John F. Kennedy Middle School
- Timber Ridge Middle School

== High schools ==
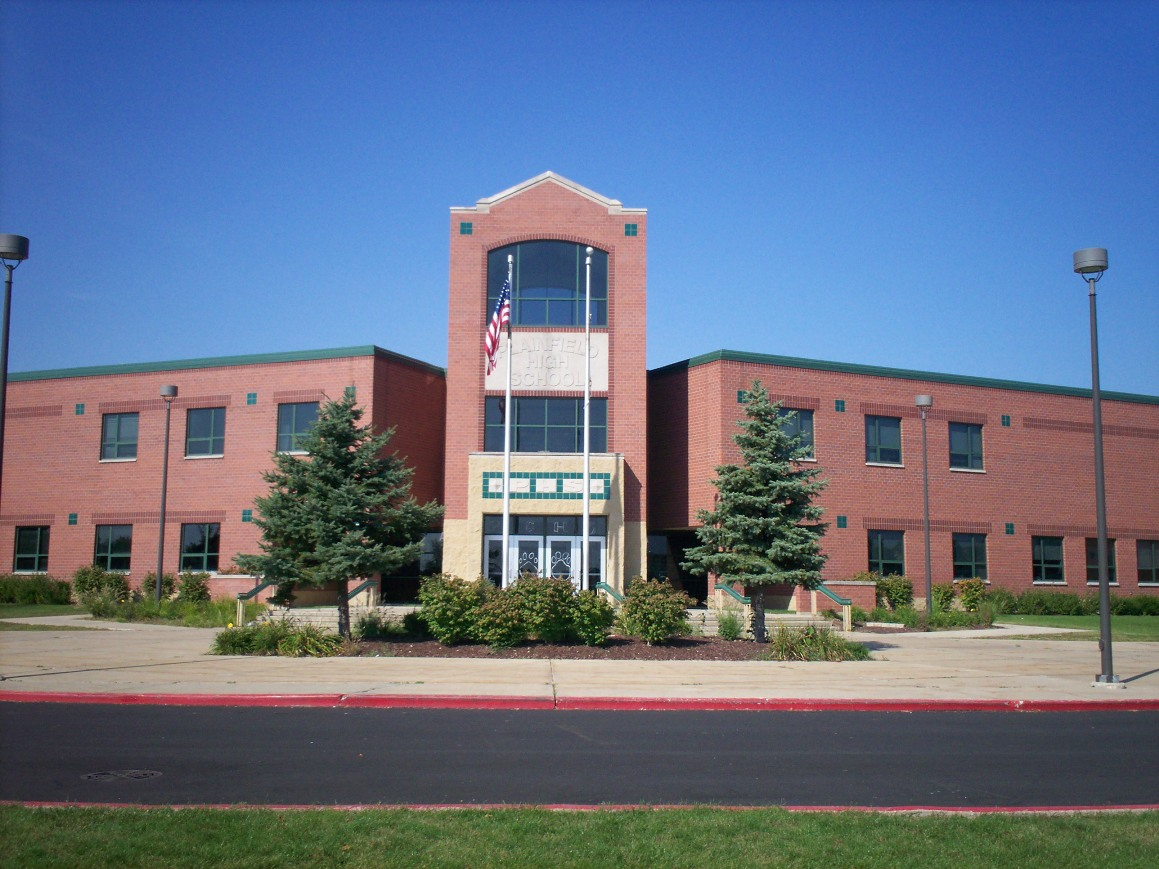
Plainfield High School Central Campus

- Plainfield Central High School
- Plainfield North High School
- Plainfield South High School
- Plainfield East High School
