= Na-Au-Say Township, Illinois =

Na-Au-Say Township
- Township
- Location in Kendall County

- Kendall County's location in Illinois
- Coordinates: 41°35′25″N 088°18′45″W
- Country: United States
- State: Illinois
- County: Kendall

Area
  - Total: 34.25 sq mi (88.7 km^{2})
  - Land: 34.25 sq mi (88.7 km^{2})
  - Water: 0 sq mi (0 km^{2}) 0%
- Elevation: 610 ft (186 m)

Population (2020)
  - Total: 10,771
  - Density: 314.5/sq mi (121.4/km^{2})
- FIPS code: 17-093-51531
- GNIS feature ID: 0429416

Na-Au-Say Township occupies the 6 mile square on the eastern edge of Kendall County, Illinois. As of the 2020 census, its population was 10,771 and it contained 3,266 housing units.

== History ==
The township's name was chosen by popular vote and came from the Native American village on the Aux Sable Creek (a branch of which flows through the township), which was named for a Potawatomi leader.

== Geography ==
According to the 2021 census gazetteer files, Na-Au-Say Township has a total area of 34.25 square miles (88.71 km^{2}), of which 34.25 square miles (88.71 km^{2}) (or 100.00%) is land and 0.00 square miles (0.00 km^{2}) (or 0.00%) is water.

== Demographics ==
Historical population
Census	Pop.	Note	%±
2000	1,672		—
2010	8,145		387.1%
2020	10,771		32.2%
U.S. Decennial Census

As of the 2020 census there were 10,771 people, 2,709 households, and 2,154 families residing in the township. The population density was 314.53 inhabitants per square mile (121.44/km^{2}). There were 3,266 housing units at an average density of 95.37 per square mile (36.82/km^{2}). The racial makeup of the township was 63.06% White, 12.32% African American, 0.65% Native American, 3.90% Asian, 0.00% Pacific Islander, 8.13% from other races, and 11.94% from two or more races. Hispanic or Latino of any race were 21.09% of the population.

There were 2,709 households, out of which 53.60% had children under the age of 18 living with them, 57.70% were married couples living together, 16.76% had a female householder with no spouse present, and 20.49% were non-families. 13.90% of all households were made up of individuals, and 3.90% had someone living alone who was 65 years of age or older. The average household size was 3.26 and the average family size was 3.68.

The township's age distribution consisted of 30.6% under the age of 18, 8.8% from 18 to 24, 28.6% from 25 to 44, 20.8% from 45 to 64, and 11.2% who were 65 years of age or older. The median age was 32.3 years. For every 100 females, there were 99.1 males. For every 100 females age 18 and over, there were 90.6 males.

The median income for a household in the township was $110,455, and the median income for a family was $115,541. Males had a median income of $72,000 versus $46,523 for females. The per capita income for the township was $42,463. About 11.6% of families and 9.1% of the population were below the poverty line, including 15.4% of those under age 18 and 7.3% of those age 65 or over.

== Government ==
The township is governed by an elected Town Board of a Supervisor and four Trustees. The Township does not have an elected Assessor specific to the Township; rather they are part of a multi-township assessment district with Seward and Lisbon Townships.

The current elected township officials are:

- Township Supervisor: Eric E. Bernacki
- Township Clerk: Rebecca Wheeler
- Township Highway Commissioner: David Wheeler
- Township Trustee: Pamela George
- Township Trustee: Stephen Shreve
- Township Trustee: Daniel Hill
- Township Trustee: Austin Nakaerts
