= Wheatland Township, Will County, Illinois =

Wheatland Township
- Township
- Location in Will County
- Coordinates: 41°40′45″N 88°12′40″W
- Country: United States
- State: Illinois
- County: Will
- Established: November 6, 1849

Area
  - Total: 35.82 sq mi (92.8 km^{2})
  - Land: 35.49 sq mi (91.9 km^{2})
  - Water: 0.33 sq mi (0.85 km^{2}) 0.92%

Population (2010)
  - Estimate (2016): 84,602
  - Density: 2,295.9/sq mi (886.5/km^{2})
- Time zone: UTC-6 (CST)
  - Summer (DST): UTC-5 (CDT)
- FIPS code: 17-197-81035
- Website: wheatlandtownship.com

Wheatland Township is located in Will County, Illinois, United States. As of the 2010 census, its population was 81,472 and it contained 25,075 housing units.

As of 2008, Wheatland Township had over 27,000 parcels located within its boundaries. It ranked third in Will County for land parcels and the highest in EAV (Equalized Assessed Value).

It covers parts of Aurora, Bolingbrook, Plainfield, and Naperville (where the Wheatland Township administrative offices are located).

== History ==
Most of Wheatland Township was still owned by the Potawatomi, a Native American tribe, until 1833. The 1833 Treaty of Chicago obtained this land and officially made it available for settlement. Growth was slow during the 1830s, due to a lack of significant wooded lands. Farmers depended on wood for building and a source of fuel. They also believed if the land could not grow trees then it would not be beneficial for farming.

Wheatland Township was surveyed between 1837-1839 and opened up for sale in 1841. The earliest settlers in this area were predominantly Scottish and English immigrants. Early farming families included: Stewart (1832), Colegrove (1839), Brockway (pre 1842), Boardman (1830–32), Boughton (pre 1842), Foster (1837), Wightman (1838), Mather (Pre 19842), Davis (1843), Findlay (1844) Stewart (1850), McLaren (1848) McMicken (1842), Gilmour (1852), King (1852) Royce (1832), Brown (1862), Kinley (1843), Clow (1844), Catchpole (1844), Cotton (1843), Patterson(1844). Other pre-1850 arrivals include Birkett, Varley, Lantz, Fry, Rathbun, Dundore, Mussey among many others. Many of these families are buried in either the Wheatland Presbyterian Church Cemetery or the Wheatland Township Cemetery where their origin of birth can be seen on the historic tombstones. Nearby and bordering Townships were populated by German and Swedish families bonded by their respective cultural heritages.

As adjacent townships grew, small settlements developed around rural crossroads, schools, churches and post offices. These centers offered goods and services and were determined by the distance the area farmers could complete a round trip in one-half day's time. Vermont Settlement, in the northwest corner of the township in sections 5–8, was the first settlement; established circa 1843 with the arrival of the Davis, Blanchard and Rice families of Vermont. Later arrivals to the settlement included the Kinley, Leppert, Piedlau and Schoger families. Tamarack crossroads was named in 1852 upon the arrival of Thomas Burnet who brought with him 4 tamarack trees from Detroit Michigan that were planted roughly a quarter-mile apart along 127th Street (originally Chaplins' Road). The crossroads included a post office that was in operation from 1858 to 1902, a general store offering hardware supplies, jewelry and watch repair, operated by Thomas Muir of Glasgow Scotland, a blacksmiths shop run by William Nairn, and a school (Tamarack School District 34) which opened in the fall of 1866 and disbanded during the Wheatland School District consolidations. Later crossroads were created along the Joliet, Elgin and Eastern Railroad. Normantown (1886–1903) and Wolf's Crossing (in Oswego Township, Kendall County 1890–1900) provided markets for farmers to weigh, sell and ship their produce. Other centers included East Wheatland Post Office originally on the Frank Boardman farm, Hoddam Post Office on the William Patterson farm, and the Tokio Post Office on the John Clow farm.

Wheatland Presbyterian Church is a church in the township and known locally as The Scotch Church, in recognition of the numerous Scottish families that had settled the area; it is in section 19. The church was founded in the home of Stephen Findlay on May 20, 1848. Rev. William Oburn was the first Reverend. The first church was built in 1856 and sat in what would currently be the parking lot for the current church constructed in 1906. The original church closed its doors on October 8, 1906, and the current church opened with special services on October 21, 1906.

Across the road on the south side of Ferguson Road, known today as 119th Street, was a one-room schoolhouse called the Wheatland Presbyterian School (District 38). The school house originally served eight grades within a single room in preparation for transfer to high school at either Plainfield, Aurora, or Oswego Illinois. The earliest school records housed at the Little White School Museum in Oswego, Illinois date back to the 1870s. The schoolhouse closed when the Wheatland Township schools consolidated into Wheatland Consolidated School District 40-C in the early 1950s. Other churches in the east Wheatland neighborhood included the Zion Lutheran Church at 103rd Street and Book Road, DuPage Presbyterian Church near Weber Road and Boughton Road.

There were numerous one room schools in Wheatland Township. West Wheatland had Tamarack school, Wheatland Presbyterian School, Lumbard School, Johnson School, and Pilcher School. East Wheatland had White School, Lantz School, Spaulding School, Dannenburg School, and the Red School.

Throughout the early 20th century, the churches created recreational leagues, among themselves, for various competitions including baseball. The most important annual activity within Wheatland Township was the Wheatland Plowing Matches. The plowing competition which began with horses and evolved into tractors measured the quality and accuracy of tilling the soil on various Township farmlands. In later years, the winner of the competition was rewarded with a trip to Scotland, where he could compete with his former countrymen. Farming was the primary industry of the township in the late 19th century and first half of the 20th century. The once magnificently beautiful farmland consisting of thousands of acres within the Township has been reduced to approximately six (6) family-owned farms with over 80 acres (320,000 m^{2}).

Some of the original farmhouses are still in existence today and can be seen throughout the township. For example, the Boughton family farmhouse is located on Plainfield-Naperville Road. The Clow farmhouse and barn have been preserved by the Forest Preserve District of Will County and is located near 111th Street and Book Road.

Wheatland Township has grown from 1,098 population in 1880 to over 81,472 according to the 2010 census.

== Geography ==
According to the 2010 census, the township has a total area of 35.82 square miles (92.8 km^{2}), of which 35.49 square miles (91.9 km^{2}) (or 99.08%) is land and 0.33 square miles (0.85 km^{2}) (or 0.92%) is water.

=== Cities, Towns, Villages ===
- Aurora (small portion)
- Bolingbrook (partial)
- Naperville (southwest quarter)
- Oswego (small portion)
- Plainfield (partial)
- Romeoville (small portion)

=== Unincorporated Towns ===
- Normantown at 41.654751°N 88.232292°W
- Tamarack at 41.650864°N 88.252846°W

== Demographics ==
Historical population
Census	Pop.	Note	%±
2016 (est.)	84,602
U.S. Decennial Census

== Facilities ==
The Wheatland Athletic Association (WAA) is a non-profit parent volunteer organization which provides Youth Athletic Programs to all residents of the District 204 school community (Naperville/Aurora, Illinois) and surrounding areas. WAA was founded in 1977 to provide T-Ball for 60 children. Today they have over 15,000 participants for children age 2 - 18 as well as adult programs.
