= Plainfield, Illinois =

- Village
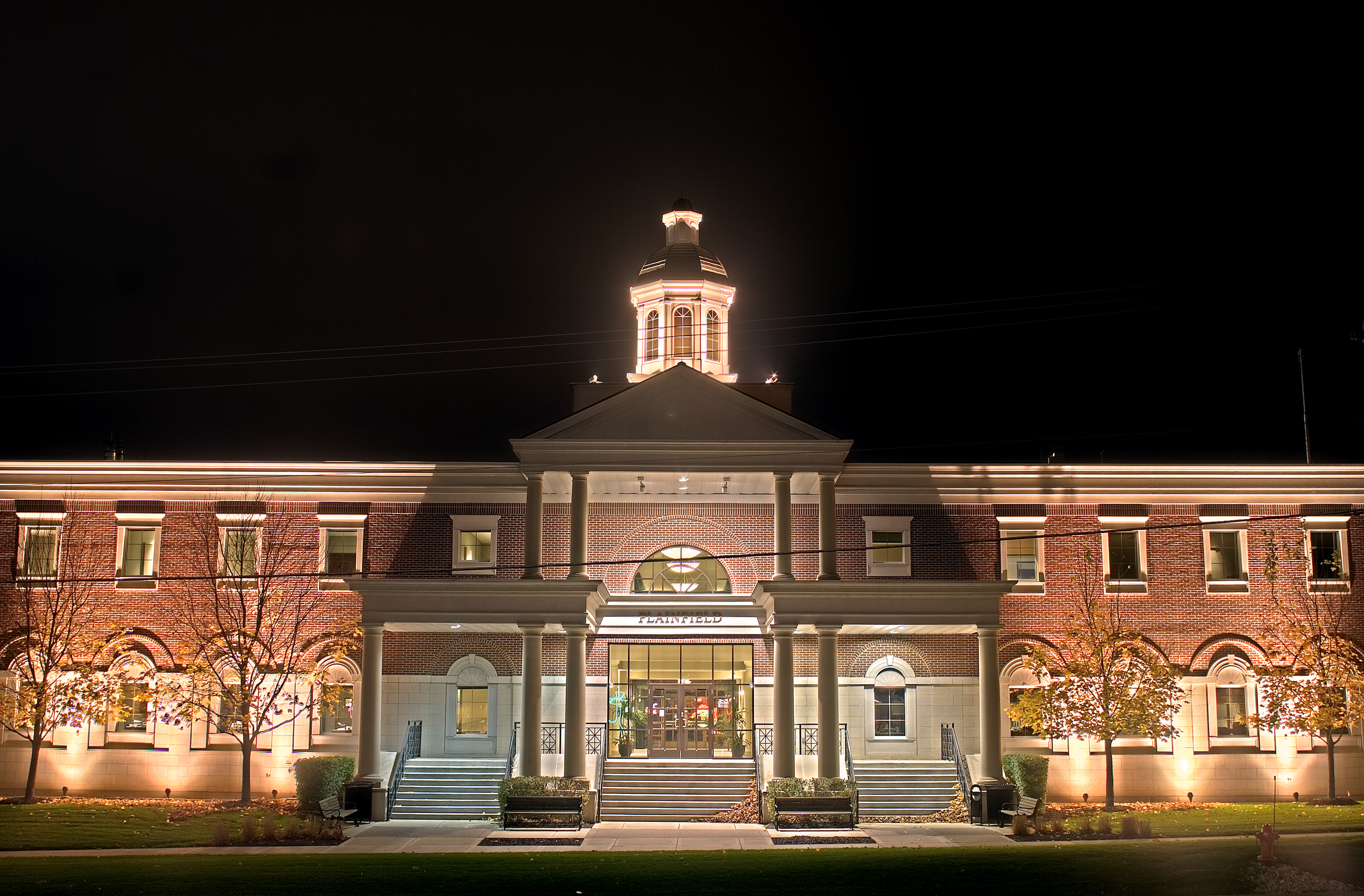
- Village Hall in Plainfield, Illinois

- Location of Plainfield in Will County, Illinois

- Location within Chicago metropolitan area Location within Illinois Location within the United States
- Coordinates: 41°37′02″N 88°14′00″W
- Country: United States
- State: Illinois
- Counties: Will, Kendall
- Townships: Plainfield (Will Co.); Wheatland (Will Co.); Na-Au-Say (Kendall Co.); Oswego (Kendall Co.)

Government
  - Mayor: John F. Argoudelis

Area
  - Total: 25.75 sq mi (66.68 km^{2})
  - Land: 24.71 sq mi (64.00 km^{2})
  - Water: 1.03 sq mi (2.68 km^{2})
- Elevation: 610 ft (190 m)

Population (2020)
  - Total: 44,762
  - Density: 1,811.4/sq mi (699.38/km^{2})
- Time zone: UTC−6 (CST)
  - Summer (DST): UTC−5 (CDT)
- ZIP codes: 60544, 60585, 60586
- Area codes: 331/630 and 779/815
- FIPS code: 17-60287
- GNIS feature ID: 2399684
- Wikimedia Commons: Plainfield, Illinois
- Website: www.plainfieldil.gov

Plainfield is a village in Will and Kendall counties in the U.S. state of Illinois. The population was 44,762 at the 2020 census.

The village includes land in Will County's Plainfield and Wheatland townships, as well as Na-Au-Say and Oswego townships in Kendall County. With the growth in the Chicago suburbs in the 1990s and 2000s, the village has seen a population increase from 4,500 in 1990 to nearly 45,000 in 2020. It is midway between the cities of Naperville and Joliet in Chicago's collar counties.

The village has established a community Preservation Commission and historic preservation ordinance. It is the home of the Lake Renwick Preserve, a county forest preserve used for birdwatching and other activities. Located south of Village Hall is Settlers' Park, which includes a lake, war monument, open space, and more. The park presents outdoor concerts to the public in the summer.

== History ==
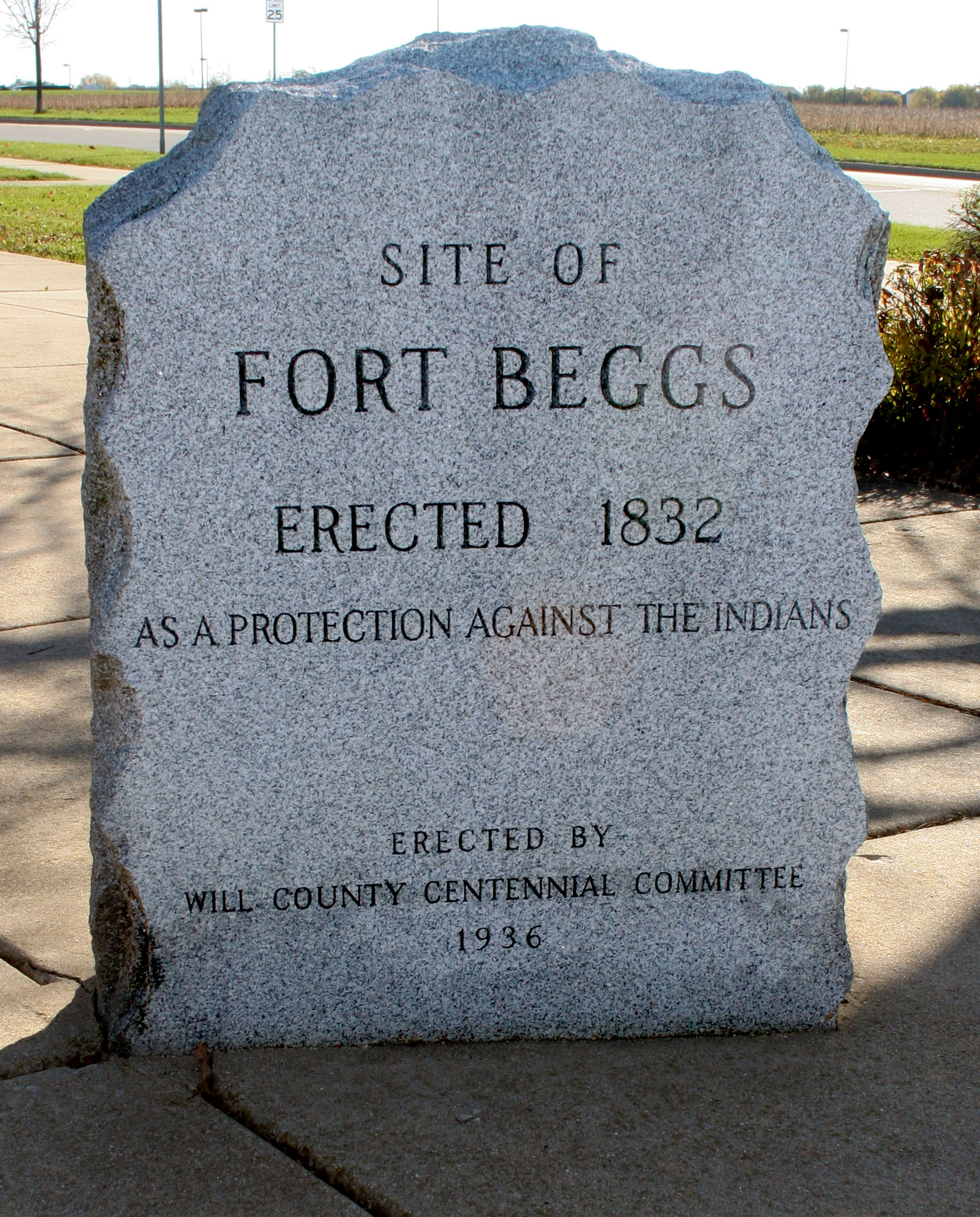
The monument marking the location and date of Fort Beggs

The area was called "Walkers' Grove" until it was platted as "Plainfield" in 1841. It was originally settled by a large community of Potawatomi people, and the land was later bequeathed to the United States as part of the Treaty of St. Louis (1816) with the Council of the Three Fires. Indian Boundary Road aligns with the western border of the tract of land originally ceded.

The earliest Europeans in the area were French fur traders. The first European-American settler in the area was James Walker, who with his father-in-law, Methodist minister Jessie Walker, traveled here in 1826 where he established a small mission for the Potawatomi people. James Walker, Jesse Walker's son-in-law, traveled with him and became the first European-American to claim land in the area in 1828.

In 1828, James Walker, in the company of several men, erected a sawmill around which the settlement of Walkers' Grove developed.

Plainfield is identified as the oldest community in Will County because the earliest settlement of Walkers' Grove was established on the banks of the DuPage River by 1828. However, the actual village of Plainfield was platted immediately north of Walkers' Grove in 1834 by Chester Ingersoll. The separate community of East Plainfield was platted in June 1836 by James Mathers, who began selling lots in July 1836. He also constructed a gristmill and a mill race west of Water Street, which would later become Plainfield-Naperville Road. Ingersoll's "Planefield" which comprised lots in Section 16, along with Mather's East Plainfield lots in Section 10 and Levi Arnold's plat of Section 9, all became joined to create the present-day village after the death of Levi Arnolds in 1845.

Walkers' Grove flourished because of the DuPage River and established routes to Fort Dearborn in Chicago, as well as to Ottawa to the west. Reuben Flagg hauled lumber from Walker's mill to Chicago in order to erect the first two frame structures in the city (the P.F.W. Peck House and the George Dole Forwarding House). Chicago also depended upon the settlement for mail and supplies.

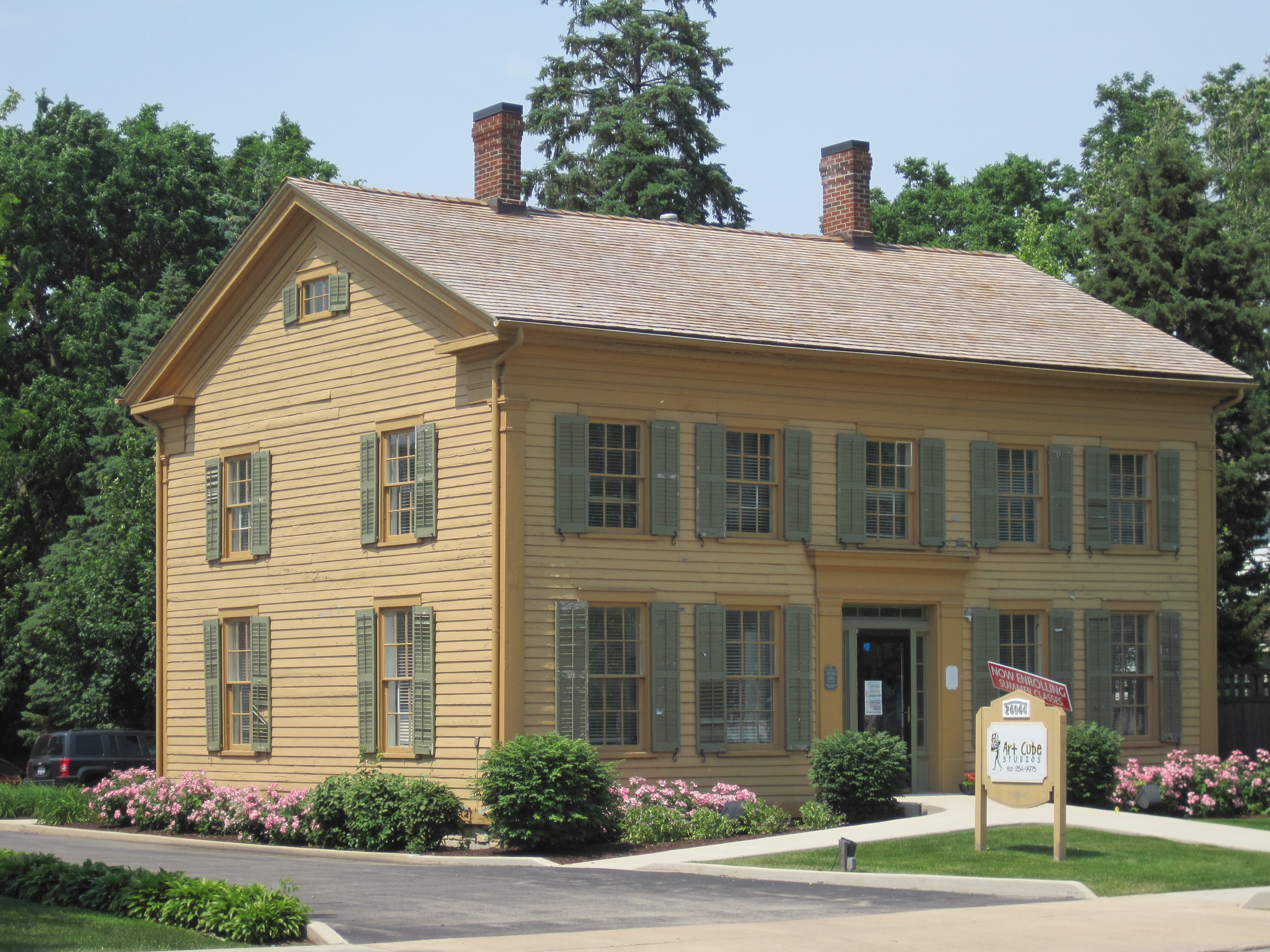
The Flanders House in Plainfield

The community's early prosperity was stunted when the Illinois and Michigan Canal opened in 1848, because the village was not located along the canal. Located within the village are numerous Greek Revival, Upright and Wing cottages, a school built in 1847, and a number of early-19th-century homes. Plainfield currently has three buildings listed on the National Register of Historic Places: Plainfield Halfway House, Flanders House, and a 1928 Standard Oil gas station.

As Illinois was dominated by abolitionists and was a free state, Plainfield abolitionists offered food and shelter to runaway slaves following the Underground Railroad.

North Central College was founded in the village in 1861 as Plainfield College.

The Plainfield Public Library District was founded in the village in 1925 as the Nimmons Village of Plainfield Free Public Library.

Plainfield is the birthplace of Eddie Gardner, one of the pilots credited with establishing the transcontinental air mail routes for the United States Postal Service. The earliest architects associated with buildings in Plainfield are J.E. Minott of Aurora; G. Julian Barnes & John H. Barnes of Joliet; and Herbert Cowell of Joliet and Plainfield.

Certain older parts of Plainfield once suffered from extreme traffic congestion. Before Interstate 55 was built just east of the village in the late 1950s, U.S. Route 30 (the Lincoln Highway) and U.S. Route 66 (sometimes referred to as "The Mother Road") merged into one street for three blocks in the center of town on what is now Illinois Route 59. The merge was between Plainfield/Joliet Road on the south to Lockport Street on the north but continues to be an area of heavy traffic congestion even outside heavy commuting periods. At one time, the two longest paved highways in the world (Lincoln Highway and U.S. Route 66) crossed within Plainfield. The highways only crossed each other twice and both locations are in Will County. The other location is in neighboring Joliet.

=== 1990 tornado ===
On August 28, 1990 at about 3:28 p.m., an F5 tornado ran its course through Plainfield. The tornado killed 29 people, 24 of whom were killed instantly and 5 that died later from injuries; 353 were injured. More than 1,100 homes were damaged and destroyed. The tornado made it across more than 16 miles (26 km) in 30 minutes. It destroyed the only Plainfield high school at the time, now called Plainfield Central High School. A warning sounded only after the tornado had passed through the town. A population boom started to take place at the end of the 20th century after the tornado, with a large number of new home subdivisions. Before this, Plainfield was primarily an agricultural town.

== Geography ==
Plainfield is located in northwestern Will County. The village limits extend west into the eastern part of Kendall County. Plainfield is bordered to the south by the city of Joliet, to the east by the village of Romeoville, to the northeast by the village of Bolingbrook, and to the north by the city of Naperville. Farmland in Kendall County is to the west.

Interstate 55 runs along the eastern edge of the village, with access from two exits. I-55 leads northeast 34 miles (55 km) to the center of Chicago and southwest 100 miles (160 km) to Bloomington. U.S. Route 30 passes through the center of Plainfield, leading northwest 13 miles (21 km) to Montgomery and southeast 9 miles (14 km) to Joliet. Illinois Route 126 crosses US-30 in the center of Plainfield, leading northeast 2.5 miles (4.0 km) to I-55 and west 14 miles (23 km) to Yorkville. Illinois Route 59 runs through the center of Plainfield with US-30 but leads north 9 miles (14 km) to the west side of Naperville and south 6 miles (10 km) to Shorewood.

According to the 2021 census gazetteer files, Plainfield has a total area of 25.75 square miles (66.69 km^{2}), of which 24.71 square miles (64.00 km^{2}) (or 95.98%) is land and 1.03 square miles (2.67 km^{2}) (or 4.02%) is water. The DuPage River flows through the village center, running south towards the Des Plaines River in the Illinois River watershed.

Like its namesake, Plainfield's topography is generally flat. Thousands of years ago, land in greater Plainfield used to be part of the bed of proglacial Lake Wauponsee. However, the lake did not hold up long, and eventually drained into the Illinois River valley. The lake left behind a very flat landscape. Much of downtown Plainfield has an elevation of around 600–625 feet (183–191 m) above sea level, with some areas in the western and northwestern portions of the village's outskirts exceeding 700 feet (210 m). This rise in elevation was created by terminal moraines that were formed during the Wisconsin Episode of the last ice age's last glacial period that has been recorded.

== Demographics ==
Historical population
Census	Pop.	Note	%±
1870	723		—
1880	686		−5.1%
1890	852		24.2%
1900	920		8.0%
1910	1,019		10.8%
1920	1,147		12.6%
1930	1,428		24.5%
1940	1,485		4.0%
1950	1,764		18.8%
1960	2,183		23.8%
1970	2,928		34.1%
1980	3,777		29.0%
1990	4,557		20.7%
2000	13,038		186.1%
2010	39,581		203.6%
2020	44,762		13.1%
U.S. Decennial Census

=== Racial and ethnic composition ===
Plainfield village, Illinois – Racial and ethnic composition Note: the US Census treats Hispanic/Latino as an ethnic category. This table excludes Latinos from the racial categories and assigns them to a separate category. Hispanics/Latinos may be of any race.
Race / Ethnicity (NH = Non-Hispanic)	Pop 2000	Pop 2010	Pop 2020	% 2000	% 2010	% 2020
White alone (NH)	12,444	29,415	30,435	93.14%	74.32%	67.99%
Black or African American alone (NH)	109	2,155	3,048	0.84%	5.44%	6.81%
Native American or Alaska Native alone (NH)	7	46	51	0.05%	0.12%	0.11%
Asian alone (NH)	163	2,993	4,299	1.25%	7.56%	9.60%
Native Hawaiian or Pacific Islander alone (NH)	1	12	10	0.01%	0.03%	0.02%
Other race alone (NH)	16	62	140	0.12%	0.16%	0.31%
Mixed race or Multiracial (NH)	94	651	1,668	0.72%	1.64%	3.73%
Hispanic or Latino (any race)	504	4,247	5,111	3.87%	10.73%	11.42%
Total	13,038	39,581	44,762	100.00%	100.00%	100.00%

=== 2020 census ===
As of the 2020 census, Plainfield had a population of 44,762, with 13,707 households and 11,399 families residing in the village. The median age was 37.3 years. 29.1% of residents were under the age of 18 and 9.8% of residents were 65 years of age or older. For every 100 females there were 97.4 males, and for every 100 females age 18 and over there were 95.2 males age 18 and over.

99.5% of residents lived in urban areas, while 0.5% lived in rural areas.

Of the village's 13,707 households, 50.3% had children under the age of 18 living in them. Of all households, 70.5% were married-couple households, 9.4% were households with a male householder and no spouse or partner present, and 15.6% were households with a female householder and no spouse or partner present. About 12.5% of all households were made up of individuals and 4.6% had someone living alone who was 65 years of age or older.

The population density was 1,738.60 inhabitants per square mile (671.28/km^{2}). There were 14,027 housing units at an average density of 544.82 per square mile (210.36/km^{2}); 2.3% were vacant. The homeowner vacancy rate was 0.9% and the rental vacancy rate was 6.1%.

=== Demographic estimates ===
An estimate reported that 14.71% of households were non-families. The average household size was 3.66 and the average family size was 3.35.

An estimate reported that 8.2% of residents were from 18 to 24, 24.5% were from 25 to 44, and 27.6% were from 45 to 64.

=== Income and poverty ===
The median income for a household in the village was $131,241, and the median income for a family was $141,664. Males had a median income of $76,366 versus $50,053 for females. The per capita income for the village was $45,365. About 1.2% of families and 1.8% of the population were below the poverty line, including 2.5% of those under age 18 and 4.3% of those age 65 or over.

== Arts and culture ==
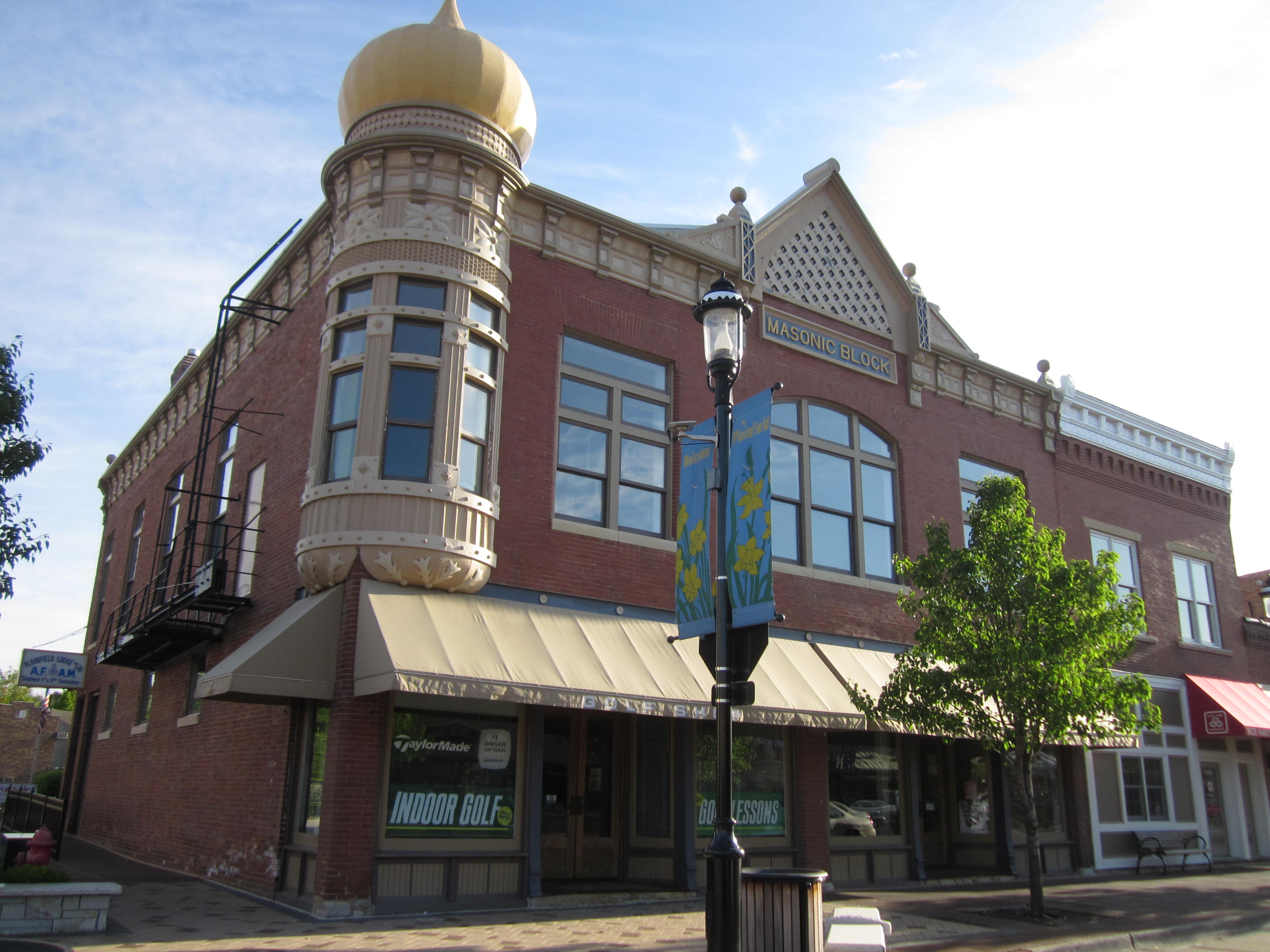
Masonic Block Building, Downtown Plainfield

In the mid-1800s, the business district of Plainfield consisted of wood-framed buildings of all shapes and sizes, yet between 1-2 stories high, and commonly had projecting awnings of wood and metal, along with either false fronted, horizontal wood cornices or large display windows. There were wood plank sidewalks that were elevated 2 ft above the dirt roads on a limestone foundation. The last wood-framed building constructed on Lockport St. was in 1869, and the first masonry buildings constructed along Lockport St. were in 1865, and the post 1870 masonry buildings introduced a new commercial look where common design themes began to integrate the buildings together; including: identical floor and roof lines, cast iron storefronts with larger windows, operable canvas awnings, stamped metal cornices, etc.

=== Churches ===
The early church buildings of Plainfield were wood-framed and imposed Greek Revival and Gothic Revival edifices along the dirt roads. In the 1850s, four different congregations built churches along Lockport street, including the Methodists, Congregationalists, the Baptists, and the Evangelicals.

In 1836 the Methodists built a wood-framed church (located on present-day Lockport street), and in 1868 they built another church much larger and of limestone (located on present-day Illinois street in downtown Plainfield). The original church built in 1836 was later converted into a business on the first floor and a social hall on the second floor.

In 1850 the Congregational Church (located at present-day Lockport and Illinois streets) was built and cost $2,200. The east wing of the church was added in 1907.

In 1836 the Baptist church erected their first church, sized at 26 ft by 36 ft, and cost of $2,500. This church was later turned into a blacksmith shop in 1857 following the construction of a new church that costed $4,500-$5,000, and burned down in 1914, then rebuilt on the same site again (located at present-day Division and Lockport streets).

== Education ==
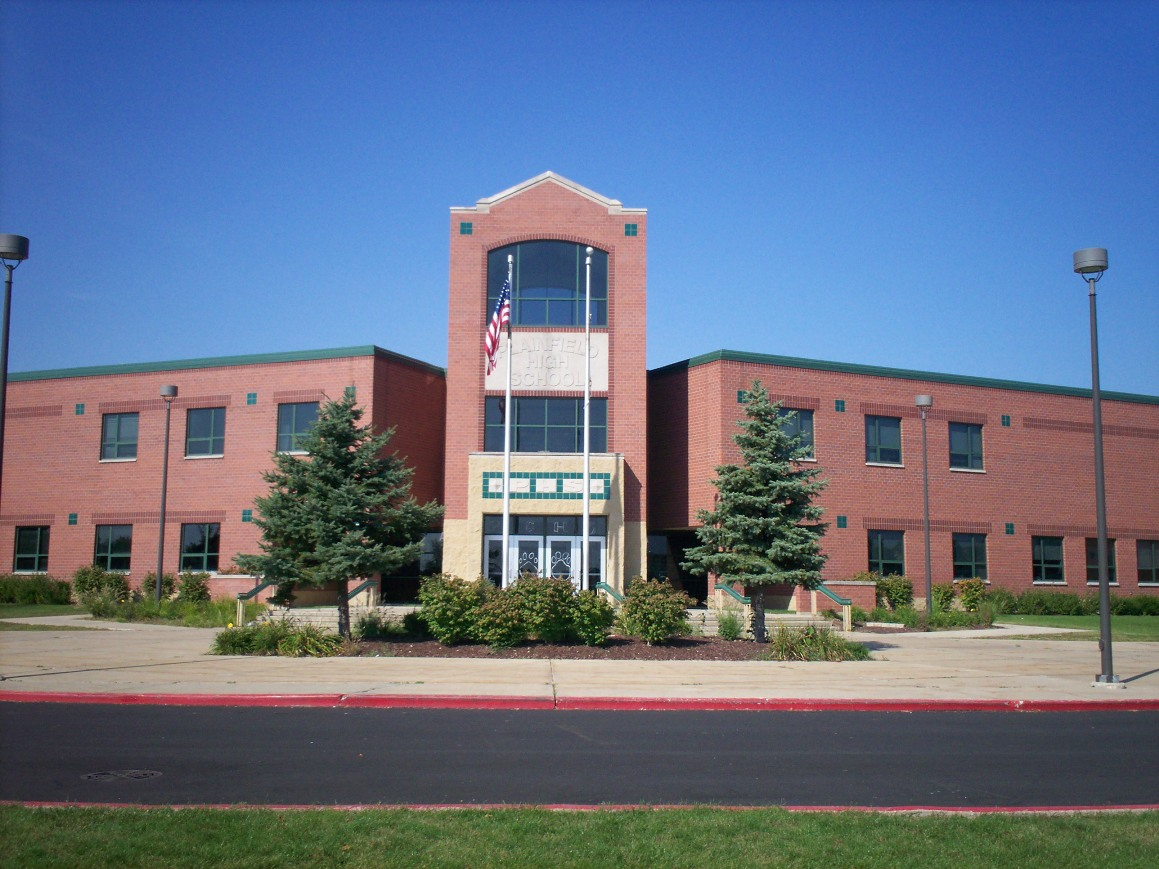
Plainfield Central High School

Within Will County, the majority of Plainfield is in Plainfield Community Consolidated School District 202, while portions are in Oswego Community Unit School District 308, and Indian Prairie Community Unit School District 204. In Kendall County, most of those parts of Plainfield are in the Owsego district, while some portions are in the Plainfield district.

Plainfield Community Consolidated School District 202 serves portions of Plainfield, Joliet, Crest Hill, Bolingbrook, Romeoville, and Plainfield Township in unincorporated parts of Will County.

Peak enrollment in the district took place in 2010–2011 at 29,254 students. The enrollment has been steadily declining since that time, and is currently declining at several hundred students per year. Current enrollment is 24,737 for the 2022–2023 school year.

Plainfield Area High Schools
High School	Established	School District	Location	County
Plainfield Central High School	1959	Plainfield Community Consolidated School District 202	24120 Fort Beggs Dr, Plainfield, IL 60544	Will
Plainfield South High School	2001	Plainfield Community Consolidated School District 202	7800 Caton Farm Rd, Plainfield, IL 60586	Kendall
Plainfield North High School	2005	Plainfield Community Consolidated School District 202	12005 S 248th Ave, Plainfield, IL 60585	Will
Plainfield East High School	2008	Plainfield Community Consolidated School District 202	12001 S Naperville Rd, Plainfield, IL 60585	Will

== Transportation ==
=== Highways ===
Major highways in Plainfield include:

Interstate Highways
Interstate 55

US Highways
US 30
US 66

Illinois Highways
Route 59
Route 126

=== Buses ===
The Pace bus system expanded two routes (755 and 855) to Plainfield beginning May 6, 2013. Both routes are "bi-directional, weekday rush hour service" from the Plainfield Village Center to Downtown Chicago. One route terminates in the Illinois Medical District and the other in Chicago's East Loop.

== Notable people ==
- Kapri Bibbs, NFL running back; raised in Plainfield and played for Plainfield North High School's varsity football team; won Super Bowl 50 with Denver Broncos
- Joel Kim Booster, comedian, actor, and writer. Born in Seoul, South Korea and raised in Plainfield
- Lisa Chesson, Olympic defenseman with U.S. women's ice hockey team; born in Plainfield and played on Plainfield Central High School's varsity hockey team
- Shea Couleé, a drag queen known for competing on RuPaul's Drag Race (season 9); RuPaul's Drag Race All Stars Season 5 winner; raised in Plainfield
- Nate Fox, power forward and center with several European teams
- John Henebry, US Air Force general; born in Plainfield
- Maurizio Iacono, Canadian-born recording artist and singer for heavy metal band Kataklysm
- Eric Johnson, NFL defensive tackle; raised in Plainfield and attended Plainfield South High School; drafted by the Indianapolis Colts
- Melissa McCarthy, actress; born in Plainfield
- Kahmari Montgomery, Professional track athlete for Nike.
- Kristopher Prather, professional ten-pin bowler and winner of the 2019 PBA Tour Playoffs; resides in Plainfield
- Alexander Ratiu, Romanian political prisoner; priest at St. Mary Immaculate Church (1975–1982)
- Warren L. Wood, Illinois politician; lived in Plainfield
- Dylan Gardner, singer-songwriter, producer, and musician; lead singer of the band Communicant; raised in Plainfield
