= 2014 SIU Edwardsville Cougars softball team =

American college softball season

2014 SIU Edwardsville Cougars softball

OVC West Division Champions OVC Tournament Champions

NCAA Tuscaloosa Regional
- Conference: Ohio Valley Conference
- West
- Record: 30–23 (19–5 OVC)
- Head coach: Sandy Montgomery (26th season)
- Assistant coaches: Jessica Jones; Alicia Abbott; Valerie McCoy
- Home stadium: Cougar Field; Capacity 800+

2014 Ohio Valley Conference softball standings
	Conf.				Overall
Team	W		L	PCT	W		L	PCT
East
Jacksonville State ‍‍‍	22	–	5	.815	40	–	15	.727
Eastern Kentucky ‍‍‍	15	–	10	.600	29	–	22	.569
Tennessee Tech ‍‍‍	15	–	15	.500	25	–	24	.510
Morehead State + ‍‍‍	9	–	16	.360	15	–	36	.294
Belmont ‍‍‍	7	–	19	.269	13	–	36	.265
Tennessee State ‍‍‍	6	–	20	.231	18	–	38	.321
West
SIU Edwardsville ‡ ‍‍‍	19	–	5	.792	30	–	23	.566
Eastern Illinois ‍‍‍	17	–	7	.708	38	–	17	.691
Murray State ‍‍‍	16	–	9	.640	32	–	23	.582
Tennessee–Martin + ‍‍‍	14	–	10	.583	27	–	27	.500
Austin Peay ‍‍‍	8	–	18	.308	20	–	32	.385
Southeast Missouri St. ‍‍‍	3	–	20	.130	11	–	34	.244
‡ – OVC Tournament champion As of May 17, 2014; Rankings from USA Today/NFCA Coaches; + = Also 1 non=conf. tie

The 2014 SIU Edwardsville Cougars softball team represented Southern Illinois University Edwardsville during the 2014 NCAA Division I softball season. The Cougars, led by twenty-sixth year head coach Sandy Montgomery, played their home games at Cougar Field as a member of the Ohio Valley Conference (OVC).

== Preseason ==
With twelve returning players from the 35–13 2013 squad, the Cougars were picked by the coaches and sports information directors of the Ohio Valley Conference to finish first in the West Division.

== Regular season ==
The season began with tournaments in Louisiana, Arizona, Mississippi, and Florida. Among the sixteen opponents in those tournaments were eight teams that would end their seasons in the NCAA Tournament, including defending national champion Oklahoma. Coach Sandy Montgomery's intent was to challenge her team early in preparation for the conference schedule. The Cougars started slowly, but showed improvement in each successive tournament; losing all four games at LSU, then winning one of five at Arizona State, two of five at Jackson State, and three of five at Central Florida.

After the tournaments, the Cougars had the full Ohio Valley Conference schedule, games versus three Missouri Valley Conference (MVC) schools, and home-and-home games with St. Louis; a scheduled game against SIU-Carbondale was cancelled due to thunderstorms. The Cougars lost to Missouri State and Northern Iowa, who both ended the season with winning records, but they defeated eventual MVC champion and NCAA tourney entry Bradley. SIUE and SLU split, each winning in the other's ballpark. In non-conference play, the Cougars earned an 8–16 record.

In the OVC, the Cougars were 10–2 against the East Division. They went 9–3 versus the West after hitting an unexpected bump in the road when losing both games at Murray State. The combined 19–5 conference record was good for first place in the West Division and the #2 seed in the OVC Tournament.

=== Highlights ===
Sophomore Haley Chambers pitched no-hit games against Tennessee Tech and Southeast Missouri State, the second and third of her SIUE career.

Coach Sandy Montgomery won her 900th game as the Cougars' head coach in the win over St. Louis.

Four Cougars were named to the All–Ohio Valley Conference teams:

- Haley Chambers, Chelsea Yankolovich, Allison Smiley, and Whitney Lanphier were named to the All–OVC second team.
- Allison Smiley and Whitney Lanphier were also named to the OVC All–Newcomer team.

Haley Chambers was named second team All-Mideast Region by the National Fastpitch Coaches Association.

== Postseason ==
The Cougars entered the double-elimination Ohio Valley Conference at Jacksonville State's University Field as the #2 seed.

After defeating Tennessee Tech and Eastern Illinois, the Cougars awaited an opponent for the finals. Continued thunderstorms eventually forced the conference to shorten the semifinals and finals to a single-elimination format. Murray State emerged from the loser's bracket, and the SIUE women dispatched them 12–1 in five innings, earning the OVC's entry in the NCAA national tournament.

Haley Chambers not only pitched all three games, striking out 27 in 20 innings, she also drove in the winning run in the Cougars' first game with a home run. She was named the tournament's MVP. Chambers, third baseman Alex McDavid, first baseman Kayla Riggs, and shortstop Chelsea Yankolovich also all selected to the All-Tournament team.

The Cougars were the first SIUE team to qualify for NCAA post-season play since the university made the transition to Division I.

Of the sixteen regional tournaments, only Tuscaloosa, Alabama had three of the top 25 ranked teams, and that was the Cougars' tournament destination, as the only unranked team.

SIUE was game versus host Alabama, 5th ranked and the #2 national seed, but fell to the eventual national runner-up Crimson Tide 13–4 in five innings. In the losers' bracket, the Cougars faced 22nd ranked South Alabama in a game that was close until the Jaguars claimed the victory with a three-run seventh-inning home run.

== Roster ==
Pink background indicates players returning from 2012–13.

2014 SIUE Cougars roster
#	Name	Position	Bats/Throws	Year	Hometown	High school
2	Haley Chambers	Pitcher	L/L	Sophomore	Coatesville, IN	Cascade HS
3	Alex McDavid	3rd Base	R/R	Junior	Suwanee, GA	North Gwinnett HS
4	Alexis Kohrs	Pitcher	R/R	Freshman	DuQuoin, IL	DuQuoin HS
5	Rebecca Gray	Outfielder	L/R	Junior	Crete, IL	Marian Catholic HS
6	Kelsey Hansen	Utility/Infield	R/R	Sophomore	East Peoria, IL	East Peoria Comm. HS
7	Chelsea Yankolovich	Shortstop	R/R	Senior	Phoenix, AZ	Sunnyslope HS
8	Kayla Riggs	1st Base/Outfield	R/R	Senior	Lincoln, IL	Lincoln Comm. HS
11	Whitney Lanphier	Outfielder	R/R	Freshman	Plainfield, IL	Plainfield South HS
12	Rachel Keller	Utility	R/R	Sophomore	Bethalto, IL	Civic Memorial HS
13	Allison Smiley	2nd Base	R/R	Freshman	Johnston City, IL	Johnston City HS
16	Rachel Coonrod	Catcher	R/R	Senior	Moro, IL	Edwardsville HS
17	Marissa Modglin	Utility/Infield	R/R	Freshman	Waterloo, IL	Waterloo HS
21	Jill Rackers	Outfielder	L/R	Senior	Jefferson City, MO	Helias Catholic HS
22	Amy Hunt	Catcher	R/R	Freshman	Troy, IL	Triad HS
23	Brittany Toney	Right Fielder	R/R	Junior	Hendersonville, TN	Goodpasture Christian School
24	Emily Hastings	Utility	R/R	Freshman	Riverside, IL	Riverside Brookfield HS
25	Christian Harryman	Utility	R/R	Sophomore	Kirksville, MO	Kirksville HS
26	Jordan LaFave	Outfielder	L/R	Sophomore	Valrico, FL	Durant HS
33	Erin Greenwalt	Pitcher	R/R	Senior	Glen Carbon, IL	Edwardsville HS

== Schedule ==
Date	Time	Opponent	Rank^{#}	Site	Result	Attendance	Winning Pitcher	Losing Pitcher
LSU Tiger Classic
February 7*	1:50 PM	Oklahoma State		Tiger Park • Baton Rouge, LA	L 1–2	1,168	Simone Freeman	Haley Chambers
February 7*	9:55 PM	#17 LSU		Tiger Park • Baton Rouge, LA	L 2–15 ^{5}	1,168	Ashley Czechner	Erin Greenwalt
February 8*	9:00 AM	Minnesota		Tiger Park • Baton Rouge, LA	L 0–5	1,628	Sara Moulton	Haley Chambers
February 8*	1:50 PM	Central Arkansas		Tiger Park • Baton Rouge, LA	L 1–2	1,628	Clara Clampitt	Haley Chambers
Arizona State Littlewood Classic
February 14*	1:30 PM	Michigan State		Farrington Stadium • Tempe, AZ	W 3–2	280	Haley Chambers	Valerie Kaff
February 14*	9:50 PM	#5 Arizona State		Farrington Stadium • Tempe, AZ	L 2–5	920	Mackenzie Popescue	Erin Greenwalt
February 15*	11:15 AM	#11 Oklahoma		Farrington Stadium • Tempe, AZ	L 2–7	262	Leslie Miller	Haley Chambers
February 15*	6:55 PM	#3 Washington		Farrington Stadium • Tempe, AZ	L 0–17 ^{5}	299	Bryana Walker	Haley Chambers
February 16*	9:00 AM	Illinois State		Farrington Stadium • Tempe, AZ	L 3–4 ^{8}	229	Regan Romshek	Haley Chambers
Jackson State Tournament
February 21*	11:00 AM	Kansas		JSU Softball Complex • Jackson, MS	L 3–4 ^{10}	69	Kelsey Kessler	Haley Chambers
February 21*	6:45 PM	Southeastern Louisiana		JSU Softball Complex • Jackson, MS	W 7–0	75	Erin Greenwalt	Rachael Hellyer
February 22*	12:00 Noon	Southeastern Louisiana		JSU Softball Complex • Jackson, MS	W 5–3	76	Haley Chambers	Hailey Weavers
February 22*	2:30 PM	Jackson State		JSU Softball Complex • Jackson, MS	L 3–4	76	Kelsey Townsend	Erin Greenwalt
February 23*	9:55 AM	Kansas		JSU Softball Complex • Jackson, MS	L 0–5	100	Kelsey Kessler	Erin Greenwalt
UCF Tournament
February 28*	10:00 AM	UCF		UCF Softball Complex • Orlando, FL	W 3–2 ^{8}	176	Erin Greenwalt	Mackenzie Audas
February 28*	2:50 PM	College of Charleston		UCF Softball Complex • Orlando, FL	L 1–4	105	Valerie Cassell	Haley Chambers
March 1*	6:00 PM	Stetson		UCF Softball Complex • Orlando, FL	W 6–5	87	Erin Greenwalt	Taylor Cochran
March 1*	9:25 PM	UCF		UCF Softball Complex • Orlando, FL	L 1–5	313	Shelby Turnier	Haley Chambers
March 2*	12:10 PM	Princeton		UCF Softball Complex • Orlando, FL	W 3–1	99	Haley Chambers	Meredith Brown
March 13*	4:00 PM	Missouri State		Killian Stadium • Springfield, MO	L 3–4	189	Chelsea Jones	Haley Chambers
March 15	1:05 PM	Austin Peay		Cougar Field • Edwardsville, Illinois	W 10–2 ^{6}	115	Erin Greenwalt	Lauren deCastro
March 15	3:30 PM	Austin Peay		Cougar Field • Edwardsville, Illinois	W 8–0 ^{6}	115	Haley Chambers	Brianna Bartuccio
March 18*	3:00 PM	Northern Iowa		Cougar Stadium • Edwardsville, Illinois	L 1–6	127	Jamie Fisher	Erin Greenwalt
March 22	12 Noon	Tennessee Tech		Tech Softball Field • Cookeville, Tennessee	W 8–2	175	Erin Greenwalt	Taylor Ketcham
March 22	2:30 PM	Tennessee Tech		Tech Softball Field • Cookeville, Tennessee	W 1–0	175	Haley Chambers	Hannah Weaver
March 23	1:30 PM	Jacksonville State		University Field • Jacksonville, Alabama	L 4–10	713	Tiffany Harbin	Erin Greenwalt
March 23	4:10 PM	Jacksonville State		University Field • Jacksonville, Alabama	W 5–1	713	Haley Chambers	Logan Green
March 30	12 Noon	Tennessee–Martin		Bettye Giles Field • Martin, Tennessee	W 7–2	102	Haley Chambers	Elizabeth Wiegand
March 30	2:15 PM	Tennessee–Martin		Bettye Giles Field • Martin, Tennessee	L 2–9	102	Casey Vincent	Erin Greenwalt
April 5	1:00 PM	Morehead State		Cougar Field • Edwardsville, Illinois	W 13–3 ^{5}	82	Haley Chambers	Tanna Seuferer
April 5	3:25 PM	Morehead State		Cougar Field • Edwardsville, Illinois	W 5–4	82	Erin Greenwalt	Megan Tymorek
April 6	1:00 PM	Eastern Kentucky		Cougar Field • Edwardsville, Illinois	W 2–0	106	Haley Chambers	Leanna Pittsenbarger
April 6	3:05 PM	Eastern Kentucky		Cougar Field • Edwardsville, Illinois	L 5–8	106	Alex Sallberg	Haley Chambers
April 9*	3:55 PM	St. Louis		Billiken Sports Center • St. Louis, Missouri	W 4–1	50	Erin Greenwalt	Brianna Lore
April 10*	4:00 PM	Bradley		Cougar Field • Edwardsville, Illinois	W 2–0	115	Haley Chambers	Lexi Cremeens
April 12	1:00 PM	Southeast Missouri State		Cougar Field • Edwardsville, Illinois	W 10–0 ^{5}	143	Haley Chambers	Hannah Durham
April 12	3:00 PM	Southeast Missouri State		Cougar Field • Edwardsville, Illinois	W 9–2	143	Erin Greenwalt	Keaira Schilling
April 13	1:00 PM	Southeast Missouri State		Cougar Field • Edwardsville, Illinois	W 3–0	136	Haley Chambers	Aubrey Denno
April 15*	4:00 PM	St. Louis		Cougar Field • Edwardsville, Illinois	L 1–2 ^{8}	163	Brianna Lore	Haley Chambers
April 18	1:10 PM	Tennessee State		Tiger Stadium • Nashville, Tennessee	W 4–2	154	Haley Chambers	Olivia Gamache
April 18	3:30 PM	Tennessee State		Tiger Stadium • Nashville, Tennessee	W 2–1	154	Alexis Kohrs	Hannah St. Clair
April 19	12:00 Noon	Belmont		E. S. Rose Park • Nashville, Tennessee	W 3–2	107	Haley Chambers	carolyn Snodgrass
April 19	2:00 PM	Belmont		E. S. Rose Park • Nashville, Tennessee	W 3–1	107	Erin Greenwalt	Taylor Moon
April 26	1:00 PM	Murray State		Racer Field • Murray, Kentucky	L 4–5 ^{8}	212	Mason Robinson	Haley Chambers
April 26	4:30 PM	Murray State		Racer Field • Murray, Kentucky	L 2–7	212	CheyAnne Gaskey	Erin Greenwalt
May 3	1:00 PM	Eastern Illinois		Cougar Field • Edwardsville, Illinois	W 2–0	208	Haley Chambers	Hannah Mennenga
May 3	3:00 PM	Eastern Illinois		Cougar Field • Edwardsville, Illinois	W 2–0	208	Erin Greenwalt	Stephanie Maday
May 4	1:00 PM	Eastern Illinois		Cougar Field • Edwardsville, Illinois	W 2–1	211	Erin Greenwalt	Stephanie Maday
Ohio Valley Conference Tournament
May 7	12:45 PM	Tennessee Tech		University Field • Jacksonville, Alabama	W 1–0	1419	Haley Chambers	Danielle Liberatore
May 8	12:45 PM	Eastern Illinois		University Field • Jacksonville, Alabama	W 4–2	919	Haley Chambers	Stephanie Maday
May 10	8:00 PM	Murray State		University Field • Jacksonville, Alabama	W 12–1 ^{6}	203	Haley Chambers	CheyAnne Gaskey
NCAA Tuscaloosa Regional Tournament
May 16*	6:45 PM	#5 Alabama		Rhoads Stadium • Tuscaloosa, Alabama	L 4–13 ^{5}	1987	Leslie Jury	Haley Chambers
May 17*	4:00 PM	#22 South Alabama		Rhoads Stadium • Tuscaloosa, Alabama	L 1–5	2093	Farish Beard	Haley Chambers
*Non-Conference Game. ^{#}Rankings from NFCA released prior to game.All times are in Central Time Zone.
