= 2017 SIU Edwardsville Cougars softball team =

American college softball season

2017 SIU Edwardsville Cougars softball
- Conference: Ohio Valley Conference
- Record: 41–13 (13–5 OVC)
- Head coach: Sandy Montgomery (29th season)
- Assistant coaches: Jessica Jones; Valerie McCoy; Cathy Weatherred; Kim Isenberg (Director of operations)
- Home stadium: Cougar Field; Capacity 800+

2017 Ohio Valley Conference softball standings
	Conf.				Overall
Team	W		L	PCT	W		L	PCT
Jacksonville State ‡ ‍‍‍	15	–	1	.938	40	–	10	.800
SIU Edwardsville ‍‍‍	13	–	5	.722	41	–	13	.759
UT Martin + ‍‍‍	13	–	5	.722	40	–	22	.645
Eastern Illinois ‍‍‍	10	–	5	.667	28	–	21	.571
Murray State + ‍‍‍	11	–	7	.611	36	–	20	.643
Eastern Kentucky ‍‍‍	11	–	9	.550	27	–	31	.466
Tennessee Tech ‍‍‍	8	–	8	.500	16	–	30	.348
Belmont ‍‍‍	10	–	12	.455	35	–	22	.614
Southeast Missouri State ‍‍‍	8	–	14	.364	23	–	27	.460
Morehead State ‍‍‍	6	–	12	.333	26	–	22	.542
Austin Peay ‍‍‍	5	–	15	.250	17	–	31	.354
Tennessee State ‍‍‍	2	–	19	.095	12	–	37	.245
‡ – OVC Tournament}] champion += to NICS; As of May 22, 2017; Rankings from USA Today/NFCA Coaches

The 2017 SIU Edwardsville Cougars softball team represented Southern Illinois University Edwardsville (SIUE) during the 2017 NCAA Division I softball season. The Cougars, led by twenty-ninth year head coach Sandy Montgomery, played their home games at Cougar Field on the SIUE campus as a member of the Ohio Valley Conference (OVC).

== Preseason ==
Twelve players returned from the 2016 squad that finished with a 28–26 overall record (15–11 in the OVC) and finished in 4th place in the regular season and as runners-up in the OVC championship tournament. They were joined by six incoming freshmen, a redshirted freshman, a transfer from another Division I program, and the return of Haley Chambers-Book, the three-time All-OVC First Team member and 2015 OVC Pitcher of the Year who did not play in 2016.

The Cougars were undefeated in six Fall contests against Saint Louis University and several community colleges.

The Cougars were picked by the coaches and sports information directors of the Ohio Valley Conference to finish second in the conference.

== Regular season ==
As usual, the 2017 season casts the Cougars in the role of road warriors, with only 17 home games on their 54-game regular-season schedule.

The schedule opened with tournaments in Louisiana, Alabama, Texas, and Florida and includes 38 schools from 17 states. Although the early season schedule is busy, the Cougars face only four teams that were in the 2016 NCAA tournament, including two that were ranked in the preseason Top 25.

The Cougars opened the season traveling to three weekend tournaments in the South.

They started by winning the "Mardi Gras Classic" at Louisiana-Monroe with a 5–0 record. In Game 4 of the tournament, Haley Chambers-Book struck out 14 opposing batters, raising her career total to 748 and breaking the previous SIUE record of 737, set by Erika Taylor during 2008–11

After picking up two wins and setting the SIUE career strikeout record, Haley Chambers-Book was named the season's first Ohio Valley Conference Pitcher of the Week.

The Cougars' first loss came in 2nd ranked Auburn's home opener, played before the start of their "Plainsman Invitational." In the tourney, the Cougars again lost to Auburn, beat Mercer twice, and beat Evansville to finish second in the tournament with a 3–1 record.

At the Baylor Tournament in Waco, Texas, the Cougars went 2–1 in the preliminary round-robin, defeating St. Francis (PA) and Massachusetts and falling to the 24th ranked hosts to earn the #2 seed. They beat St. Francis (PA) in the semifinals, but lost the championship to #24 Baylor 3–2.

The Cougars played three neutral site games prior to the "Under Armour Showcase". On their first day in Clearwater, they beat Penn 3–1 The next day, Haley Chambers-Book pitched an 11 strikeout one-hitter to South Dakota State before Emily Ingles and Ashley Koziol threw the first combined no-hitter (33rd overall) in school history against LaSalle.

On the first day of the "Under Armour Showcase", The Cougars defeated Holy Cross 4–2 and Providence 3–0. The come-from-behind victory over Holy Cross was the 1,000th win of coach Sandy Montgomery's 29-year career, making her only the 32nd head coach in all divisions to top the 1,000 win mark.

On Day 2 of the "Under Armour Showcase", The Cougars wore their hitting shoes, beating Fort Wayne 8–0 in six innings and St. Joseph's 11–2 in five.

The Cougars closed out the "Under Armour Showcase" and their Florida trip with a 4–3 win over South Dakota State, running their win streak to eight games. Of the twenty-one teams playing four to six games in the "Under Armour Showcase", only the Cougars (5–0) and Central Michigan (4–0) were undefeated.

After earning four wins during the week, including having the larger share of the combined no-hitter against LaSalle, freshman Emily Ingles was named the Ohio Valley Conference Pitcher of the Week.

On March 13, the Cougars debuted in the national rankings, receiving votes in both the USA Today/NFCA Coaches and the ESPN.com/USA Softball polls.

The Cougars hosted their first home tournament since 2008 and the first of the Division I era at Cougar Field. They beat Toledo and Northern Kentucky, but fell to tournament champions Ball State.

SIUE hosted unranked but highly touted Kansas of the Big 12 Conference in a mid-week game. Haley Chambers-Book had a perfect game going into the seventh inning before yielding two hits and a run in a 7–1 victory.

The double-header versus Tennessee State was an unexpected pair of pitchers' duels. In the first game, TSU's Lauren Powell threw a four-hitter at the Cougars, while Haley Chambers-Book countered with her fifth career no-hit game; two runs scored without a hit in the third inning brought the win to SIUE. In the second game, Lauren Woodard limited the Cougars to five hits while Emily Ingles held the Lady Tigers to only four; two of the Cougar hits came in the bottom of the ninth and scored the winning run.

Following her no-hitter versus Tennessee State and her one-hitter against Kansas, Haley Chambers-Book earned her second OVC Pitcher of the Week award of the year.

Belmont, one of the hottest-hitting teams in Division I, came to Cougar Field with a record of 24–7 against the Cougars' 24–5. Haley Chambers-Book held the Bruins to three hits and one run while striking out seven in winning Game 1 2–1. In Game 2, the Belmont bats came alive after the first time through the lineup, and the Bruins scored three in the 4th and five in the 5th to gain an 8–2 win.

For the third season in a row, the Cougars traveled to Carbondale to face the Salukis in the home stadium of their elder sister school. While Haley Chambers-Book struck out 11 in a four-hit shutout, the Cougars used three straight hits, a passed ball, and a two-base advance on a sacrifice fly to take a 3–0 lead in the third and added an insurance run in the seventh for the 4–0 victory.

UT Martin, the second of four OVC teams in the top 50 hitting teams in the NCAA, came into Cougar Field with a record of 24–8. Haley Chambers-Book threw a one-hit shutout at the Skyhawks in her 15th win, as the Cougars scored five runs on eight hits; the score was held down by UT Martin pulling off three double-plays. As Belmont had done in their second game, the Skyhawks got their vaunted hitting act underway in the second time through the batting order. UTM scored one in the 3rd, two in the 5th, and four in the 7th on twelve hits, while the Cougars only eked out three runs on four hits.

Her shutout wins over SIU and UTM gained Haley Chambers-Book consecutive OVC Pitcher of the Week awards---her third of the year.

The Cougars were rude hosts as they entertained the Bradley Braves. Haley Chambers-Book tossed a three-hitter in her sixth shutout of the season. The Cougars scored ten runs on twelve hits to shorten the game to five innings under the mercy rule.

In the first game of a four-game OVC road trip, the Cougars blew out Eastern Kentucky 11–0 in Game one of the first doubleheader as Haley Chambers-Book struck out thirteen in a two-hit game. In Game 2, the Cougars needed three pitchers and eight innings to gain the 7–5 win. Chambers-Book earned her 18th win in a two-inning relief appearance. Moving on to Morehead State, SIUE used two homers in the first game and three doubles in the second to sweep the Eagles 4–0 and 2–1.

With three complete-game shutouts and a win in relief, Haley Chambers-Book got her third consecutive OVC Pitcher of the Week award---her fourth of 2017. Hitting .412 with three runs, two doubles, two home runs and eight RBI for the week, Sarah Lopesilvero was named OVC Co-Player of the Week.

The Cougars took a mid-week trip to Urbana for their first-ever meeting with the Illinois Fighting Illini, who carried the NCAA's #25 RPI (versus SIUE's #41) and were ranked #27 in both national Top 25 polls. The Cougars took the lead in the top of the 3rd only to have the Illini tie the game in the bottom half of the inning. In the 4th, SIUE's nationally 6th-ranked defense faltered, committing two errors in allowing Illinois to score four runs; two unearned. Both teams had six hits, as Haley Chambers-Book pitched a complete game while the Illini used four pitchers in their 5–2 win.

Haley Chambers-Book earned the wins in both halves of the doubleheader with Southeast Missouri State, her 20th and 21st of the season. In Game 1, Chambers-Book and Emily Ingles held the Redhawks to three his in the Cougars' 13th shutout of the season. In Game 2, SEMO took a 1–0 lead in the top of the 5th and a 4–3 lead in the top of the 7th before SIUE would tie the game in the bottom of both innings. The Cougars won on a bases-loaded single by senior second baseman Allison Smiley in the bottom of the 10th inning.

Crossing the Mississippi to play at Saint Louis, the Cougars struck early, scoring 3 in the first. The Billikens tied the score in the second, but SIUE scored more runs in the 4th, 5th, and 6th innings to take win #35 of the season 7–3. The Cougars used three pitchers, with Haley Chambers-Book picking up another win in relief--- her 22nd.

For the first-ever meeting between two top 50 RPI teams from the OVC, the Cougars traveled to Alabama to face league-leading Jacksonville State. The Gamecocks used home runs to take both games. A walk-off homer won Game i 5–3 in 8 innings. A sixth-inning homer gave JSU a 2–1 lead that was preserved by a seventh-inning diving catch in center field and throw to first for a double play.

The Sunday double-header at Tennessee Tech was postponed due to inclement weather. Then, the scheduled game at Missouri State was cancelled because of poor field condition.

On April 24 Haley Chambers-Book was drafted by the Texas Charge as the 14th overall pick in the 2017 National Pro Fastpitch (NPF) College Draft.

The Saturday doubleheader versus the Austin Peay Governors was moved to Friday, but it was still delayed four hours in starting by thunderstorms. In Game 1, Haley Chambers-Book threw a 9 strikeout two-hitter in an 8–0 five inning rout. In Game 2, Emily Ingles had a no-hitter into the seventh in her 10 strikeout one-hit 1–0 win, With the sweep, the Cougars moved back into second place in the OVC race. Chambers-Book's 23rd win moved her into second place on the Cougars' career wins list, passing coach Sandy Montgomery.

With the doubleheader against Murray State rained out, five of the Cougars' last nine games were cancelled due to weather and/or field conditions.

In the season-ending doubleheader, SIUE faced cross-state rivals, the Eastern Illinois Panthers. In Game 1, Haley Chambers-Book pitched her tenth complete game shutout of the season. It was also her third one-hit shutout of the season, and the Cougars took the win 6–0, led by Allison Smiley's 4 RBIs. In Game 2, EIU built a 7–0 lead before the Cougars seventh inning comeback effort fell short, 7–4.

After pitching her tenth complete game shutout of the season and raising her record to 24–6, Haley Chambers-Book was named OVC Co-Pitcher of the Week---her fifth award of 2017.

=== Honors ===
The Ohio Valley Conference Awards were announced at a banquet in Oxford, Alabama prior to the start of the league tournament. Senior Haley Chambers-Book was named OVC Pitcher of the Year and a member of the All-OVC First Team. The Pitcher of the Year was her second award, having also won it in 2015, and the First Team selection was her fourth, having earned the distinction 2013–15. Senior second baseman Allison Smiley, senior shortstop Sarah Lopesilvero. and sophomore center fielder Alyssa Heren were named to the All-OVC Second Team; it was Heren's second consecutive selection.. Lopesilvero, a transfer from Louisville, freshman first baseman Zoe Schafer, and freshman pitcher Emily Ingles were named to the OVC All-Newcomer Team.

== Postseason ==
SIUE and UT Martin tied for second place in the regular season, and UTM was given the #2 seed in the OVC Tournament held at Choccolocco Park in Oxford, Alabama, with the Cougars seeded third.

In the tournament's opening game, Eastern Kentucky struck first when the first batter walked, then scored on a one-out double. The Cougars evened things up in the 3rd with a hit, sacrifice bunt, error, and sacrifice fly. Both Haley Chambers-Book and EKU pitchers Mollie Paulick and Alex Salberg threw three hitters. While the Colonels' two other hits were harmless, the Cougars' two others were a two-run fifth inning homer by Tess Eby and a seventh inning solo shot by Chambers-Book to close the scoring at 4–1.

The second-round game against #2 seed UT Martin was another pitchers' duel with both Haley Chambers-Book and Brooke Kennedy tossing two-hit games. The Skyhawks scored first with a walk, stolen base, and double in the second inning. The Cougars rallied in the fourth, picking up two runs on a walk, their two hits, and a UTM throwing error, sending SIUE to face top-seeded Jacksonville State and UTM to the losers bracket.

Top seeded Jacksonville State took control with three runs on three hits and a Cougar error in the top of the first inning of the first semifinal. SIUE got back one run in the bottom of the inning, but JSU scored one more in the fifth and two in the seventh, while the Cougars managed only a seventh inning homer by Sarah Lopesilvero in losing 6–2. The Gamecocks advanced to the finals, while SIUE must play the winner of the UT Martin–Eastern Kentucky game in the second semifinal for a chance at a rematch with JSU.

In the second semifinal game, Haley Chambers-Book allowed no hits in her five inning start, with the only UT Martin base-runner caught stealing. SIUE scored one run in the second and five in the third. The Skyhaws managed to get a run on three two-out hits in the sixth, but the Cougars got that back in the seventh, winning 7–1. Both Alyssa Heren and Sarah Lopesilvero had three his in four at-bats as SIUE advanced to its fourth consecutive OVC Final.

The Cougars jumped out on top in the first inning, scoring four runs on three hits and two Gamecock errors. But JSU got through to Haley Chambers-Book, who had only allowed ten home runs all season, getting one in the second, a two-run shot in the third, and another solo longball in the seventh. Then, following a triple, the SIUE star then threw an even more rare wild pitch, allowing JSU to take the lead in the eventual 5-4 win. The Gamecocks earned the OVC's automatic win to the NCAA Championship tournament, and the Cougars must wait to see if their RPI remains high enough for an at-large bid.

Cougar seniors Haley Chambers-Book, Allison Smiley, and Sarah Lopesilvero were named to the Ohio Valley Conference All-Tournament Team.

The NCAA tournament selection committee chose Wisconsin, Oregon State, and Fresno State, all with lesser RPIs than SIUE, preventing the Cougars from becoming the first OVC team to get an at-large bid. Six teams that the Cougars played were among the 64 teams in the tournament. SIUE could have accepted an invitation to the inaugural National Invitational Softball Championship (NISC), but the season's financial resources had been expended in the strong early-season schedule with its extended trips to tournaments in Louisiana, Alabama, Texas, and Florida.

Haley Chambers-Book was named to the National Fastpitch Coaches Association's All-Mideast Region First Team. Allison Smiley was named tor the All-Mideast Region Second Team. This was Chambers-Book's third All-Region selection and Smiley's first.

Haley Chambers-Book was named by Fastpitchnews.com as a Second Team All-American Pitcher. She became the first Cougars softball player to be named an All-American since the program moved to Division I in 2009.

== Roster ==
Buff background indicates players returning from 2016. Pink background indicates player returning from 2015.

2017 SIU Edwardsville Cougars roster
#	Name	Position	Bats/Throws	Year	Hometown	High school/College
0	Maria Prete	Infielder	R/R	Junior	Westmont, Illinois	Westmont High School
1	Zoe Schafer	Infielder	R/R	R-Freshman	Noblesville, Indiana	Noblesville High School
2	Haley Chambers-Book †	Pitcher	L/L	Senior	Coatesville, Indiana	Cascade HS
3	Sarah Lopesilvero	Infielder	R/R	Senior	Simpsonville, Kentucky	Oldham Country High School / Louisville
4	Conner Cutright	Outfielder	L/R	Freshman	Casey, Illinois	Casey-Westfield High School
5	Alyssa Heren	Outfielder	L/L	Sophomore	Saline, Michigan	Saline High School
8	Haley Adrian	Infielder	R/R	Junior	Auburn, Alabama	Auburn High School
9	Tess Eby	Catcher	R/R	Junior	Grapevine, Texas	Colleyville Heritage High School
11	Whitney Lanphier	Outfielder	R/R	Senior	Plainfield, Illinois	Plainfield South High School
12	Abby Marlow	Pitcher	R/R	Freshman	New Athens, Illinois	New Athens High School
13	Allison Smiley †	Infielder	R/R	Senior	Johnston City, Illinois	Johnston City High School
15	Savannah Fisher	Outfielder	R/R	Sophomore	Hallsville, Missouri	Hallsville High School
17	Page Clinton	Utility	R/R	Senior	Ina, Illinois	Mt. Vernon Township High School/Lake Land
18	Sydney Bina	Catcher	R/R	Freshman	Washington, Illinois	Peoria Notre Dame High School
21	Talisa Morton	Utility	L/R	Junior	Fenton, Missouri	Rockwood Summit High School/Indiana State
22	Amy Hunt	Catcher/Infielder	R/R	Senior	Troy, Illinois	Triad High School
23	Reagan Curtis	Outfielder	R/L	Freshman	Helena, Alabama	Helena High School
24	Jane Smith	Utility	R/R	Sophomore	Wheaton, Illinois	St. Francis College Prep
26	Emily Ingles	Pitcher	R/R	Freshman	Scottsdale, Arizona	Arcadia High School
31	Ashley Koziol	Pitcher	R/R	Junior	Willow Springs, Illinois	Lyons Township High School/Youngstown State
33	Kalei Kaneshiro	Catcher/Infielder	R/R	Freshman	Pearl City, Hawaii	Kamehameha Schools

↑ = Team captains

== Schedule ==
Date	Time	Opponent	Rank^{#}	Site	Result	Attendance	Winning Pitcher	Losing Pitcher
Louisiana–Monroe Warhawks Mardi Gras Classic
02/10/2017*	9:00 am CST	Grambling State Tigers		Geo-Surfaces Field • Monroe, Louisiana	W 10–2 ^{(5 innings)}	33	Ashley Koziol (W, 1–0)	Caitlin McDowell
02/10/2017*	11:00 am CST	Northwestern State Lady Demons		Geo-Surfaces Field • Monroe, Louisiana	W 4–1	66	Haley Chambers-Book (W, 1–0)	M. Brown
02/11/2017*	1:45 pm CST	Prairie View A&M Lady Panthers		Geo-Surfaces Field • Monroe, Louisiana	W 4–1	78	Emily Ingles (W, 1–0)	A. Higgins
02/11/2017*	8:00 pm CST	Louisiana–Monroe Warhawks		Geo-Surfaces Field • Monroe, Louisiana	W 2–1 ^{(10 innings)}	103	Haley Chambers-Book (W, 2–0)	Melanie Coyne
02/12/2017*	10:00 am CST	Sam Houston State Bearkats		Geo-Surfaces Field • Monroe, Louisiana	W 11–5	112	Haley Chambers-Book (W, 3–0)	Tayler Atkinson
02/16/2017*	6:00 pm CST	#2 Auburn Tigers		Jane B. Moore Field • Auburn, Alabama	L 3–4 ^{(8 innings)}	1,886	Kaylee Carlson	Haley Chambers-Book (W, 3–1)
Auburn Tigers Plainsman Invitational
02/17/2017*	5:15 pm CST	#2 Auburn Tigers		Jane B. Moore Field • Auburn, Alabama	L 1–8	2,057	Kaylee Carlson	Emily Ingles (W, 1–1)
02/17/2017*	7:25 pm CST	Evansville Purple Aces		Jane B. Moore Field • Auburn, Alabama	W 6–1	2,057	Haley Chambers-Book (W, 4-1)	Emily Lockhart
02/18/2017*	10:30 am CST	Mercer Bears		Jane B. Moore Field • Auburn, Alabama	W 4–3	2,420	Emily Ingles (W, 2-1)	Jill McElderry
02/19/2017*	10:30 am CST	Mercer Bears		Jane B. Moore Field • Auburn, Alabama	W 5–2	2,233	Haley Chambers-Book (W, 5-1)	Stella Preston
Baylor Invitational
02/24/2017*	10:00 am CST	Saint Francis (PA) Red Flash		Getterman Stadium • Waco, Texas	W 8–6	655	Ashley Koziol (W, 2-0)	Abby Trahan
02/24/2017*	3:00 pm CST	#24 Baylor Lady Bears		Getterman Stadium • Waco, Texas	L 0–4	858	Kelsee Selman	Haley Chambers-Book (L, 5-2)
02/24/2017*	12:30 pm CST	UMass Minutewomen		Getterman Stadium • Waco, Texas	W 8–2	878	Ashley Koziol (W, 3-0)	Meg Colleran
02/24/2017*	5:30 pm CST	Saint Francis (PA) Red Flash		Getterman Stadium • Waco, Texas	W 4–2	936	Haley Chambers-Book (W, 6-2)	Ketarah DeVries
02/26/2017*	12:00 noon CST	#24 Baylor Lady Bears		Getterman Stadium • Waco, Texas	L 2–3	799	Kelsee Selman	Haley Chambers-Book (L, 6-3)
Neutral site games
03/07/2017*	11:00 am CST	Penn Quakers		Eddie C. Moore Softball Complex • Clearwater, Florida	W 3–1	79	Haley Chambers-Book (W, 7-3)	Alexis Sargent
03/08/2017*	9:00 am CST	South Dakota State Jackrabbits		Eddie C. Moore Softball Complex • Clearwater, Florida	W 4–0	75	Haley Chambers-Book (W, 8-3)	Abby Deane
03/08/2017*	11:00 am CST	La Salle Explorers		Eddie C. Moore Softball Complex • Clearwater, Florida	W 12–0 ^{(5 innings)}	75	Emily Ingles (W, 3-1) (No-Hitter by Ingles & Ashley Koziol)	McKenzie Peace
USF Series – Under Armour Showcase
03/10/2017*	3:30 pm CST	Holy Cross Crusaders		E.C.Moore Softball Complex, Field #2 • Clearwater, Florida	W 4–2 (Coach Sandy; Montgomery's; 1000th career win)	126	Emily Ingles (W, 4-1)	Alexandra Held
03/10/2017*	5:45 pm CST	Providence Friars		E.C.Moore Softball Complex, Field #2 • Clearwater, Florida	W 3–0	125	Haley Chambers-Book (W, 9-3)	Christina Ramirez
03/11/2017*	10:30 am CST	Fort Wayne Mastodons		E.C. Moore Softball Complex, Field #4 • Clearwater, Florida	W 8–0 ^{(6 innings)}	48	Emily Ingles (W, 5-1)	Olivia White
03/11/2017*	3:15 pm CST	Saint Joseph's Hawks		E.C.Moore Softball Complex, Field #2 • Clearwater, Florida	W 11–2 ^{(5 innings)}	125	Ashley Koziol (W, 4-0)	Madison Clarke
03/12/2017*	8:00 am CDT	South Dakota State Jackrabbits		E.C. Moore Softball Complex, Field #3 • Clearwater, Florida	W 4–3	125	Emily Ingles (W, 6-1)	Abby Deane
SIUE Tournament
03/17/2017*	4:00 pm CDT	Toledo Rockets	#rv	Cougar Field • Edwardsville, Illinois	W 3–2	145	Haley Chambers-Book (W, 10-3)	Kailey Minarchick
03/18/2017*	12 noon CDT	Ball State Cardinals	#rv	Cougar Field • Edwardsville, Illinois	L 1–6	145	Alyssa Rothwell	Haley Chambers-Book (W, 10-4)
03/19/2017*	12 noon CDT	Northern Kentucky Norse	#rv	Cougar Field • Edwardsville, Illinois	W 8–0 ^{(6 innings)}	212	Emily Ingles (W, 7-1)	Paige McQueen
03/22/2017*	3:00 pm CDT	Kansas Jayhawks	#rv	Cougar Field • Edwardsville, Illinois	W 7–1	125	Haley Chambers-Book (W, 11-4)	Alexis Reid
03/~~-25-~~24/2017	1:00 pm CDT	Tennessee State Tigers	#rv	Cougar Field • Edwardsville, Illinois	W 2–0	75	Haley Chambers-Book (W, 12–4) (Her 5th career no-hit game)	Lauren Powell
03/~~-25-~~24/2017	3:00 pm CDT	Tennessee State Tigers	#rv	Cougar Field • Edwardsville, Illinois	W 1–0 ^{(9 innings)}	75	Emily Ingles (W, 8-1)	Lauren Woodard
03/26/2017	1:00 pm CDT	Belmont Bruins	#rv	Cougar Field • Edwardsville, Illinois	W 2–1	185	Haley Chambers-Book (W, 13–4)	Brooklin Lee
03/26/2017	3;00 pm CDT	Belmont Bruins	#rv	Cougar Field • Edwardsville, Illinois	L 2–8	185	Ashley Johnson	Emily Ingles (W, 8-2)
03/29/2017*	4:00 pm CDT	SIUC Salukis		Charlotte West Stadium • Carbondale, Illinois	W 4–0	232	Haley Chambers-Book (W, 14–4)	Brianna Jones
04/01/2017	1:00 pm CDT	UT Martin Skyhawks		Cougar Field • Edwardsville, Illinois	W 5–0	337	Haley Chambers-Book (W, 15–4)	Seeley Layne
04/01/2017	3:00 pm CDT	UT Martin Skyhawks		Cougar Field • Edwardsville, Illinois	L 3–7	337	Brooke Kennedy	Emily Ingles (W, 8-3)
04/04/2017*	4:00 pm CDT	Bradley Braves		Cougar Field • Edwardsville, Illinois	W 10–0 ^{(5 innings)}	108	Haley Chambers-Book (W, 16–4)	Emily Visnic
04/08/2017	12 noon CDT	Eastern Kentucky Colonels		Gertrude Hood Field • Richmond, Kentucky	W 11–0	275	Haley Chambers-Book (17–4)	Alex Sallberg
04/08/2017	2::00 pm CDT	Eastern Kentucky Colonels		Gertrude Hood Field • Richmond, Kentucky	W 7–5	275	Haley Chambers-Book (18–4)	Mollie Paulick
04/09/2017	11:00 am CDT	Morehead State Eagles		University Field • Morehead, Kentucky	W 4–0	108	Haley Chambers-Book (19–4)	Chelsea McManaway
04/09/2017	1:00 pm CDT	Morehead State Eagles		University Field • Morehead, Kentucky	W 2–1	108	Ashley Koziol (5–0)	Megan Tymorek
04/11/2017*	5:00 pm CDT	#rv Illinois Fighting Illini		Eichelberger Field • Urbana, Illinois	L 2–5	461	Taylor Edwards	Haley Chambers-Book (19–5)
04/14/2017	1:00 pm CDT	Southeast Missouri State Redhawks		Cougar Field • Edwardsville, Illinois	W 4–0	379	Haley Chambers-Book (20–5)	Alexis Estes
04/14/2017	3:00 pm CDT	Southeast Missouri State Redhawks		Cougar Field • Edwardsville, Illinois	W 5–4 ^{(10 innings)}	379	Haley Chambers-Book (21–5)	Mackenzie Hoelting
04/18/2017*	5:30 pm CDT	Saint Louis Billikens		Billiken Sports Center • St. Louis, Missouri	W 7–3	215	Haley Chambers-Book (221–5)	Maddie Baalman
04/22/2017	1:00 pm CDT	Jacksonville State Gamecocks		University Field • Jacksonville, Alabama	L 3–5	1,012	Whitney Gillespie	Haley Chambers-Book (22–6)
04/22/2017	3:00 pm CDT	Jacksonville State Gamecocks		University Field • Jacksonville, Alabama	L 1–2	1,012	Taylor West	Emily Ingles (8-4)
04/23/2017	12 noon CDT	Tennessee Tech Golden Eagles		Tech Softball Field • Cookeville, Tennessee		~~Postponed~~; Cancelled	—	—
04/23/2017	2:00 pm CDT	Tennessee Tech Golden Eagles		Tech Softball Field • Cookeville, Tennessee		~~Postponed~~; Cancelled	—	—
04/26/2017*	4:00 pm CDT	Missouri State Bears		Killian Sports Complex • Springfield, Missouri		Cancelled	—	—
04/~~29~~ 28/2017	~~1:00~~ 5:14 pm CDT	Austin Peay Governors		Cougar Field • Edwardsville, Illinois	W 8–0	114	Haley Chambers-Book (23–6)	Kelsey Gross
04/~~29~~ 28/2017	~~3:00~~ 7:15 pm CDT	Austin Peay Governors		Cougar Field • Edwardsville, Illinois	W 1–0	114	Emily Ingles (9-4)	Autumn Hanners
04/30/2017	1:00 pm CDT	Murray State Racers		Cougar Field • Edwardsville, Illinois		Cancelled	—	—
04/30/2017	3:00 pm CDT	Murray State Racers		Cougar Field • Edwardsville, Illinois		Cancelled	—	—
05/06/2017	1:00 pm CDT	Eastern Illinois Panthers		Williams Field • Charleston, Illinois	W 6–0	180	Haley Chambers-Book (24–6)	Jessica Wireman
05/06/2017	3:00 pm CDT	Eastern Illinois Panthers		Williams Field • Charleston, Illinois	L 4–7	180	Michelle Rogers	Ashley Koziol (5–1)
2017 Ohio Valley Conference softball tournament
06/10/2017*	10:00 am CDT	Eastern Kentucky^{5th seed}		Choccolocco Park • Oxford, Alabama	W 4–1	860	Haley Chambers-Book (25–6)	Mollie Paulick (12-11)
06/11/2017*	12:30 pm CDT	UT Martin^{2nd seed}		Choccolocco Park • Oxford, Alabama	W 2–1	757	Haley Chambers-Book (26–6)	Brooke Kennedy (21–6)
May 12, 2017*	3:00 pm CDT	Jacksonville State^{1st seed}		Choccolocco Park • Oxford, Alabama	L 2–6	1,137	Whitney Gillespie (20–4)	Haley Chambers-Book (26–7)
May 13, 2017*	10:00 am CDT	UT Martin ^{2nd seed}		Choccolocco Park • Oxford, Alabama	W 7–1	2,178	Haley Chambers-Book (27–7)	Brooke Kennedy (23–7)
May 13, 2017*	12:30 pm CDT	Jacksonville State^{1st seed}		Choccolocco Park • Oxford, Alabama	L 4–5	2,178	Taylor West (16-4)	Haley Chambers-Book (27–8)
*Non-Conference Game. ^{#}Rankings from NFCA released prior to game.All times are in Central Time Zone.
