= 2016 SIU Edwardsville Cougars softball team =

American college softball season

2016 SIU Edwardsville Cougars softball
- Conference: Ohio Valley Conference
- Record: 28–26 (15–11 OVC)
- Head coach: Sandy Montgomery (28th season)
- Assistant coaches: Jessica Jones; Brittini Merchant; Valerie McCoy; Cathy Weatherred (Operations dir,)
- Home stadium: Cougar Field; Capacity 800+

2016 Ohio Valley Conference softball standings
	Conf.				Overall
Team	W		L	PCT	W		L	PCT
Jacksonville State ‡ ‍‍‍	26	–	0	1.000	43	–	17	.717
Eastern Kentucky ‍‍‍	17	–	8	.680	37	–	17	.685
Eastern Illinois ‍‍‍	17	–	8	.680	25	–	28	.472
SIU Edwardsville ‍‍‍	15	–	11	.577	28	–	26	.519
Tennessee–Martin ‍‍‍	14	–	13	.519	30	–	26	.536
Tennessee Tech ‍‍‍	14	–	13	.519	23	–	33	.411
Morehead State ‍‍‍	11	–	11	.500	26	–	27	.491
Murray State ‍‍‍	12	–	14	.462	14	–	31	.311
Belmont ‍‍‍	11	–	16	.407	19	–	35	.352
SE Missouri State ‍‍‍	10	–	17	.370	16	–	33	.327
Austin Peay ‍‍‍	5	–	22	.185	9	–	387	.023
Tennessee State ‍‍‍	3	–	22	.120	10	–	45	.182
‡ – OVC Tournament champion As of May 9, 2016; Rankings from USA Today/NFCA Coaches

The 2016 SIU Edwardsville Cougars softball team represented Southern Illinois University Edwardsville (SIUE) during the 2016 NCAA Division I softball season. The Cougars, led by twenty-eighth year head coach Sandy Montgomery, played their home games at Cougar Field on the SIUE campus as a member of the Ohio Valley Conference (OVC).

== Preseason ==
Ten players returned from the 2015 squad that finished with a 43–16 overall record (20–6 in the OVC) and won the OVC regular season championship. They were joined by six freshmen and three transfer students, It was announced in the fall that the 2015 OVC Pitcher-of-the-Year Haley Chambers had left school for personal reasons.

The Cougars were picked by the coaches and sports information directors of the Ohio Valley Conference to finish fourth in the conference.

== Regular season ==
The Cougars opened the season with their usual extended on-the-road schedule. They were 2–3 in the Florida Atlantic Kick-Off Classic in Boca Raton, Florida. At South Alabama's Mardi Gras Invitational in Mobile, Alabama, they were 1–3. In Spartanburg, South Carolina for USC Upstate's Spartan Invitational, they were 2–2. They also lost at South Carolina and two at Western Carolina before their home opener, a nine inning win over Drake. Three of their five remaining non-conference games, scheduled while also playing the OVC games. were cancelled due to weather; with a win versus UIC and a loss to Bradley.

In OVC play, SIUE went 15–11 (one game against Eastern Kentucky cancelled by thunderstorms) to finish in fourth place.
