= 2016 Ohio Valley Conference softball tournament =

- Teams: 8
- Format: Double Elimination
- Finals site: Choccolocco Park; Oxford, AL
- Champions: Jacksonville State (5th title)
- Winning coach: Jana McGinnis (5th title)
- MVP: Whitney Gillespie (Jacksonville State)
- Attendance: 4,965
- Television: OVC Digital Network

The 2016 OVC softball championship was held May 11–14 at Choccolocco Park in Oxford, Alabama. This marked the 23rd time the championship had been held and the fourth year it featured eight teams. This year was the first year it was held at the neutral site in Oxford instead of at the site of the No. 1 seed. The tournament winner earned the OVC's automatic bid to the 2016 NCAA Division I softball tournament. All games were streamed courtesy of the OVC Digital Network.

The defending champion was Tennessee Tech which won its seventh OVC Championship in 2015.

2016 Ohio Valley Conference softball standings
	Conf.				Overall
Team	W		L	PCT	W		L	PCT
Jacksonville State ‡ ‍‍‍	26	–	0	1.000	43	–	17	.717
Eastern Kentucky ‍‍‍	17	–	8	.680	37	–	17	.685
Eastern Illinois ‍‍‍	17	–	8	.680	25	–	28	.472
SIU Edwardsville ‍‍‍	15	–	11	.577	28	–	26	.519
Tennessee–Martin ‍‍‍	14	–	13	.519	30	–	26	.536
Tennessee Tech ‍‍‍	14	–	13	.519	23	–	33	.411
Morehead State ‍‍‍	11	–	11	.500	26	–	27	.491
Murray State ‍‍‍	12	–	14	.462	14	–	31	.311
Belmont ‍‍‍	11	–	16	.407	19	–	35	.352
SE Missouri State ‍‍‍	10	–	17	.370	16	–	33	.327
Austin Peay ‍‍‍	5	–	22	.185	9	–	387	.023
Tennessee State ‍‍‍	3	–	22	.120	10	–	45	.182
‡ – OVC Tournament champion As of May 9, 2016; Rankings from USA Today/NFCA Coaches

== Results ==
Upper round 1	Upper round 2	Upper final	Final
1	Jacksonville State Gamecocks	5
8	Murray State Racers	0
1	Jacksonville State	3
4	SIU Edwardsville	2
4	SIU Edwardsville Cougars	6
5	UT Martin Skyhawks	5
1	Jacksonville State	12^{(5)}
3	Eastern Kentucky	0
3	Eastern Kentucky Colonels	3
6	Tennessee Tech Golden Eagles	0
3	Eastern Kentucky	6
2	Eastern Illinois	4
2	Eastern Illinois Panthers	7
7	Morehead State Eagles	0	1	Jacksonville State	1	6
4	SIU Edwardsville	2	1
Lower round 1	Lower round 2	Lower round 3	Lower final
2	Eastern Illinois	10
8	Murray State	2	8	Murray State	5	3	Eastern Kentucky	4
5	UT Martin	0	2	Eastern Illinois	3	4	SIU Edwardsville	3
4	SIU Edwardsville	6
4	SIU Edwardsville	1
6	Tennessee Tech	1	7	Morehead State	0
7	Morehead State	2
