= 2017 Ohio Valley Conference softball tournament =

Tournament

- Teams: 8
- Format: Double Elimination
- Finals site: Choccolocco Park; Oxford, AL
- Champions: Jacksonville State (6th title)
- Winning coach: Jana McGinnis (6th title)
- MVP: Whitney Gillespie (JSU)
- Attendance: 4,932
- Television: OVC Digital Network

The 2017 OVC softball championship was held May 10–14 at Choccolocco Park in Oxford, Alabama. This marked the 24th time the championship had been held and the fifth year it featured eight teams. This was the second straight year it was held at the neutral site in Oxford instead of on the home field of the No. 1 seed. The tournament winner, Jacksonville State, earned the OVC's automatic bid to the 2017 NCAA Division I softball tournament. All games were streamed courtesy of the OVC Digital Network.

In 2016, Jacksonville State won its fifth OVC Championship and first since 2013 by topping SIUE in the Championship Game.

2017 Ohio Valley Conference softball standings
	Conf.				Overall
Team	W		L	PCT	W		L	PCT
Jacksonville State ‡ ‍‍‍	15	–	1	.938	40	–	10	.800
SIU Edwardsville ‍‍‍	13	–	5	.722	41	–	13	.759
UT Martin + ‍‍‍	13	–	5	.722	40	–	22	.645
Eastern Illinois ‍‍‍	10	–	5	.667	28	–	21	.571
Murray State + ‍‍‍	11	–	7	.611	36	–	20	.643
Eastern Kentucky ‍‍‍	11	–	9	.550	27	–	31	.466
Tennessee Tech ‍‍‍	8	–	8	.500	16	–	30	.348
Belmont ‍‍‍	10	–	12	.455	35	–	22	.614
Southeast Missouri State ‍‍‍	8	–	14	.364	23	–	27	.460
Morehead State ‍‍‍	6	–	12	.333	26	–	22	.542
Austin Peay ‍‍‍	5	–	15	.250	17	–	31	.354
Tennessee State ‍‍‍	2	–	19	.095	12	–	37	.245
‡ – OVC Tournament}] champion: += to NICS As of May 22, 2017 Rankings from USA Today/NFCA Coaches

== Results ==
Upper round 1	Upper round 2	Upper final	Final
1	Jacksonville State Gamecocks	'8
8	Belmont Bruins	5
1	Jacksonville State	4
4	Eastern Illinois	2
4	Eastern Illinois Panthers	6
5	Murray State Racers	5
1	Jacksonville State	6
3	SIU Edwardsville	2
3	SIU Edwardsville Cougars	4
6	Eastern Kentucky Colonels	1
3	SIU Edwardsville	2
2	UT Martin	1
2	UT Martin Skyhawks	1
7	Tennessee Tech Golden Eagles	0	1	Jacksonville State	5	–
3	SIU Edwardsville	4	–
Lower round 1	Lower round 2	Lower round 3	Lower final
8	Belmont	-
8	Belmont	5	2	UT Martin	4	2	UT Martin	1
5	Murray State	1	2	UT Martin	5	3	SIU Edwardsville	7
6	Eastern Kentucky	3
6	Eastern Kentucky	5
6	Eastern Kentucky	11^{(5)}	4	Eastern Illinois	0
7	Tennessee Tech	2
