= 2015 Ohio Valley Conference softball tournament =

- Teams: 8
- Format: Double Elimination
- Finals site: Cougar Field; Edwardsville, IL
- Champions: Tennessee Tech (7 title)
- Winning coach: Bonnie Bynum Graham (1 title)
- MVP: Danielle Liberatore (Tennessee Tech)
- Attendance: 1,332
- Television: OVC Digital Network

The 2015 Ohio Valley Conference (OVC) softball tournament was held at Cougar Field in Edwardsville, Illinois, home of Southern Illinois University Edwardsville, from May 6 through May 9, 2015. The tournament winner earned the OVC's automatic bid to the 2015 NCAA Division I softball tournament. All games were streamed courtesy of the OVC Digital Network.

2015 Ohio Valley Conference softball standings
	Conf.				Overall
Team	W		L	PCT	W		L	PCT
SIU Edwardsville ‍‍‍	20	–	6	.769	43	–	16	.729
Jacksonville State ‍‍‍	18	–	6	.750	38	–	17	.691
Murray State ‍‍‍	20	–	7	.741	38	–	19	.667
Tennessee Tech ‡ ‍‍‍	15	–	11	.577	32	–	25	.561
Eastern Kentucky ‍‍‍	13	–	10	.565	24	–	28	.462
Eastern Illinois ‍‍‍	14	–	11	.560	21	–	27	.438
Southeast Missouri St. ‍‍‍	12	–	12	.500	19	–	27	.413
Morehead State ‍‍‍	11	–	11	.500	22	–	24	.478
Tennessee–Martin ‍‍‍	9	–	15	.375	24	–	26	.480
Belmont ‍‍‍	8	–	16	.333	13	–	32	.289
Austin Peay ‍‍‍	5	–	22	.185	9	–	37	.196
Tennessee State ‍‍‍	4	–	22	.154	11	–	37	.229
‡ – OVC Tournament champion As of May 9, 2015; Rankings from USA Today/NFCA Coaches

== Tournament ==
Upper round 1	Upper round 2	Upper final	Final
1	SIU Edwardsville	8
8	Morehead State	3
1	SIU Edwardsville	1
4	Tennessee Tech	4
4	Tennessee Tech	11
5	Eastern Kentucky	3^{(6)}
4	Tennessee Tech	6
3	Murray State	4
2	Jacksonville State	21
7	Southeast Missouri State	0^{(5)}
2	Jacksonville State	4
3	Murray State	5
3	Murray State	6
6	Eastern Illinois	4	4	Tennessee Tech	3
1	SIU Edwardsville	2
Lower round 1	Lower round 2	Lower round 3	Lower final
2	Jacksonville State	13
5	Eastern Kentucky	2	5	Eastern Kentucky	6	3	Murray State	2
8	Morehead State	0	2	Jacksonville State	0	1	SIU Edwardsville	2
1	SIU Edwardsville	8^{(6)}
1	SIU Edwardsville	10
6	Eastern Illinois	10	6	Eastern Illinois	2^{(5)}
7	Southeast Missouri State	9^{(12)}

- All times listed are Central Daylight Time.
