= Conference USA softball tournament =

- Conference softball championship
- Sport: Softball
- Conference: Conference USA
- Number of teams: 6
- Format: Double-elimination tournament
- Current stadium: Delaware Softball Diamond
- Current location: Newark, Delaware
- Played: 2000-present
- Last contest: 2026 Conference USA softball tournament
- Current champion: Jacksonville State
- Most championships: 3 current members with 2 titles

The Conference USA softball tournament is the conference championship tournament in college softball for Conference USA. It is a single-elimination (since 2006) tournament and seeding is based on regular season records. The winner receives the conference's automatic bid to the NCAA Division I softball tournament.

== Tournament ==
The tournament is a double-elimination tournament, with six teams participating. The teams are seeded based on conference regular season winning percentage. The number of teams and specific format has varied based on the number of teams in the conference each year.

== Champions ==
=== Year-by-year ===
Year	School	Venue	MVP
2000	Southern Miss	Oak Grove Optimist Park • Hattiesburg, MS	Courtney Blades, Southern Miss
2001	Southern Miss	Ulmer Stadium • Louisville, KY	Felicia Gonzales, Southern Miss
2002	DePaul	USF Softball Complex • Tampa, FL	Lindsay Chouinard, DePaul
2003	DePaul	Cougar Softball Stadium • Houston, TX	Lindsay Chouinard, DePaul
2004	DePaul	Ulmer Stadium • Louisville, KY	Sarah Martz, DePaul
2005	DePaul	USF Softball Complex • Tampa, FL	Megan Huitink, DePaul
2006	Tulsa	Donna J. Hardesty Sports Complex • Tulsa, OK	Julia Fennell, Tulsa
2007	Houston	UCF Softball Complex • Orlando, FL	Angel Shamblin, Houston
2008	UCF	Cougar Softball Stadium • Houston, TX	Tiffany Lane, UCF
2009	Tulsa	Helen of Troy Softball Complex • El Paso, TX	Lauren Lindsay, Tulsa
2010	East Carolina	Cougar Softball Stadium • Houston, TX	Toni Paisley, East Carolina
2011	East Carolina	ECU Softball Stadium • Greenville, NC	Priscilla Velasquez, East Carolina
2012	Tulsa	UAB Softball Field • Birmingham, AL	Lacey Middlebrooks, Tulsa
2013	Marshall	Collins Family Softball Complex • Tusla, OK	Andi Williamson, Marshall
2014	Tulsa	FAU Softball Stadium • Boca Raton, FL	Aimee Creger, Tulsa
2015	Western Kentucky	Felsburg Field at FIU Stadium • Miami, FL	Miranda Kramer, Western Kentucky
2016	Florida Atlantic	Loveland Field • Denton, TX	Kylee Hanson, Florida Atlantic
2017	Louisiana Tech	Southern Miss Softball Complex • Hattiesburg, MS	Pauline Tufi, Louisiana Tech
2018	Middle Tennessee	Sue M. Daughtridge Stadium • Charlotte, NC	Cori Jennings, Middle Tennessee
2019	Louisiana Tech	Mary Bowers Field • Birmingham, AL	Jazlyn Crowder, Louisiana Tech
2020	Cancelled due to the coronavirus pandemic		
2021	Western Kentucky	WKU Softball Complex • Bowling Green, KY	Kennedy Sullivan, Western Kentucky
2022	North Texas	Lovelace Stadium • Denton, TX	Molly Rainey, North Texas
2023	Middle Tennessee	Dr. Billy Bundrick Field • Ruston, LA	Shelby Sargent, Middle Tennessee
2024	Liberty	NM State Softball Complex • Las Cruces, NM	Brooke Roberts, Liberty
2025	Liberty	WKU Softball Complex • Bowling Green, KY	Elena Escobar, Liberty
2026	Jacksonville State	Delaware Softball Diamond • Newark, DE	Morgan Nowakowski, Jacksonville State

=== By school ===
School	Championships	Years
DePaul	4	2002, 2003, 2004, 2005
Tulsa	4	2006, 2009, 2012, 2014
East Carolina	2	2010, 2011
Liberty	2	2024, 2025
Louisiana Tech	2	2017, 2019
Middle Tennessee	2	2018, 2023
Southern Miss	2	2000, 2001
Western Kentucky	2	2015, 2021
Houston	1	2007
Florida Atlantic	1	2016
Jacksonville State	1	2026
Marshall	1	2013
North Texas	1	2022
UCF	1	2008

Italics indicate school no longer sponsors softball in Conference USA.
