= 2015 SIU Edwardsville Cougars softball team =

American college softball season

2015 SIU Edwardsville Cougars softball

OVC regular-season champion
- Conference: Ohio Valley Conference
- Record: 43–16 (20–6 OVC)
- Head coach: Sandy Montgomery (27th season)
- Assistant coaches: Jessica Jones; Valerie McCoy; Cathy Weatherred
- Home stadium: Cougar Field; Capacity 800+

2015 Ohio Valley Conference softball standings
	Conf.				Overall
Team	W		L	PCT	W		L	PCT
SIU Edwardsville ‍‍‍	20	–	6	.769	43	–	16	.729
Jacksonville State ‍‍‍	18	–	6	.750	38	–	17	.691
Murray State ‍‍‍	20	–	7	.741	38	–	19	.667
Tennessee Tech ‡ ‍‍‍	15	–	11	.577	32	–	25	.561
Eastern Kentucky ‍‍‍	13	–	10	.565	24	–	28	.462
Eastern Illinois ‍‍‍	14	–	11	.560	21	–	27	.438
Southeast Missouri St. ‍‍‍	12	–	12	.500	19	–	27	.413
Morehead State ‍‍‍	11	–	11	.500	22	–	24	.478
Tennessee–Martin ‍‍‍	9	–	15	.375	24	–	26	.480
Belmont ‍‍‍	8	–	16	.333	13	–	32	.289
Austin Peay ‍‍‍	5	–	22	.185	9	–	37	.196
Tennessee State ‍‍‍	4	–	22	.154	11	–	37	.229
‡ – OVC Tournament champion As of May 9, 2015; Rankings from USA Today/NFCA Coaches

The 2015 SIU Edwardsville Cougars softball team represented Southern Illinois University Edwardsville (SIUE) during the 2015 NCAA Division I softball season. The Cougars, led by twenty-seventh year head coach Sandy Montgomery, played their home games at Cougar Field on the SIUE campus as a member of the Ohio Valley Conference (OVC).

== Preseason ==
Eleven players returned from the 2013 squad that finished with a 30–23 overall record (19–5 in the OVC) and advanced to the NCAA tournament after winning the OVC championship. They were joined by four freshmen, a junior college All-American transfer, and a senior who was a member of the Cougars' OVC champion women's soccer team.

The Cougars were picked by the coaches and sports information directors of the Ohio Valley Conference to finish first in the conference.

== Regular season ==
The 2015 season cast the Cougars in the role of road warriors, with only 17 home games on their 55-game regular-season schedule.

The schedule opened with tournaments in Louisiana, Alabama, Georgia, and Florida and included 36 schools from 14 states and the District of Columbia. Although the early season schedule was not as grueling as 2014's, the Cougars faced four other teams that were in the 2014 NCAA tournament, including two that were ranked in the preseason Top 25.

The Cougars opened the season traveling to three weekend tournaments in the South. They started by winning the Lady Techster Invitational at Louisiana Tech with a 4–1 record. The following weekend, they went 3–1 and finished second to the 10th-ranked Bulldogs at their Georgia Softball Classic. The third weekend took them to Auburn, Alabama for the Wilson/DeMarini Classic and another second-place finish behind the 16th-ranked host Auburn Tigers with a 3–2 record.

Following a week off, the team went to Florida during break for five games at the USF Series - Under Armour Showcase and a pair of games in Fort Myers. After sweeping the games at Clearwater, the Cougars ran their win streak to seven games before falling at FGCU and finishing the pre-conference schedule with a record of 16–5. At this point, the first NCAA Rating Percentage Index (RPI) was issued, with the Cougars earning the number 32 ranking of the 295 Division I teams.

On March 20, Haley Chambers struck out 20 Morehead State batters en route to the second perfect game of her Cougar career. She became the first Cougar pitcher to toss two perfect games. It was the sixth SIUE perfect game and the program's 32nd no-hitter. The game was also her fourth no-hitter. Only current Cougar coach Sandy Montgomery has thrown more no-hit games, with six during her Cougar playing career, 1982–85. As a result, the junior not only was named the OVC Pitcher of the Week (her fourth of five awards for the season), but she was also named the Louisville Slugger/National Fastpitch Coaches Association (NFCA) Division I National Pitcher of the Week.

On April 16, Cougar pitcher Baylee Douglass was named as one of the twenty-five finalists for the NFCA Division I National Freshman of the Year Award. At the time, she had a 13–4 record with a 1.97 earned run average (ERA). She was also nationally ranked in several statistical categories: 12th in saves (4), 38th in walks allowed/seven innings (1.40), 61st in ERA (1.97), 61st in hits allowed/seven innings (5.41), and 73rd in strikeouts/seven innings (7.6). Douglass was the only OVC player to be named a finalist.

The Cougars clinched their first OVC regular season championship with a 7–2 win in the first game of the season's final series at Eastern Illinois on May 2. However, losses in five of their last ten games dropped the Cougars' RPI to number 50, essentially making it a near necessity that they win the OVC tournament, since the chance of an at-large bid was then problematic.

=== Honors ===
The Ohio Valley Conference awards were announced at a banquet prior to the start of the league tournament. The Cougars team accepted the 2015 OVC softball regular-season championship trophy. Haley Chambers was named OVC Pitcher of the Year and a member of the All-OVC First Team. Rebecca Gray was also named to the All-OVC First Team. Baylee Douglas was named OVC Freshman of the Year and a member of both the All-OVC Second Team and the OVC All-Newcomer Team. Cougars head coach Sandy Montgomery was named the OVC Coach of the Year.

== Postseason ==
The Cougar hosted the Ohio Valley Conference softball tournament at Cougar Field beginning on Wednesday, May 6.

In the opening game, the Cougars came back from a 0–3 first inning deficit to defeat Morehead State 8–3 behind Haley Chambers' 10 strikeout three hit game. Chambers, Alex McDavid, and Jordan Lafave homered in the win.

As the visiting team on their own field (determined by coin flip), the Cougars again fell behind in the first inning of the second game, with an error allowing Tennessee Tech (the only OVC squad they had not defeated) to take a 2–0 lead. The host team got one run back in the third, but gave up single runs in the fifth and sixth innings. Haley Chambers struck out nine, but allowed four runs (two earned) on four hits, while TTU pitcher Danielle Liberatore struck out 10, allowing only one run on six hits. The Cougars moved to the loser's bracket to face Eastern Illinois.

Again the visitors at home, the Cougars wasted no time in taking the lead on Eastern Illinois, getting four runs on three hits in the top of the first. They added three runs in the second, two in the third, and their tenth run in the fourth. Eastern managed to get on the board with a two-run homer in the fifth, but that was all, and the game ended at 10–2 in five innings with EIU eliminated from the tournament. The Cougars move on to play the winner of the Jacksonville State–Eastern Kentucky game, which was scheduled to be the last game of the day. A five-hour rain delay after the Cougars win would have moved the last game to a start time of around 9:39 PM, but the other two games both ran long, putting the start time after 10:PM, so the SIUE–Jacksonville State game was rescheduled for 10:00 AM on Saturday. For SIUE or JSU to win the tournament, either team would need to win three games on Saturday and one on Sunday.

In the first of a possible three Saturday games, the top-seeded Cougars went up on the second-seeded Jacksonville State Gamecocks 1–0 in the first. They added a second run in the third, then scored five in the fifth while Haley Chambers did not allow a hit until the fifth. Alex McDavid's fourth RBI of the game ran the score to 8–0 in the bottom of the sixth, ending the game on the mercy rule and advancing the Cougars to play the final elimination game against Murray State for the right to play Tennessee Tech in the Championship game(s).

After another long rain delay, SIUE and Murray State played in a rare pitchers' duel in this high-scoring OVC tournament. Murray got on the board first with a single run in the third on a double, a wild pitch, and a sacrifice fly. The Cougars were held scoreless by CheyAnne Gaskey on only two hits through five innings before getting two runs on two hits and a Racers error in the top of the sixth to take the lead. Haley Chambers went 4 2/3 before giving way to Baylee Douglass, who got the win after 2 1/3 hitless innings. The Cougars earned a 45-minute break before again facing Tennessee Tech in the championship round.

In the championship, Baylee Douglass threw three hitless innings before giving up a homer, a walk, and a second homer to open the fourth, giving Tennessee Tech a 3–0 lead. Danielle Liberatore once more seemingly owned the Cougars, allowing only four hits until there were two out in the seventh, when the Cougars finally found their offense. Three singles cut the lead to one run with the tying and winning runs on base before Liberatore threw her ninth strikeout to win the game and the tournament for the Golden Eagles.

Cougar shortstop Alex McDavid, pitcher/designated player Haley Chambers, and second baseman Allison Smiley were named to the OVC All-Tournament Team.

== Roster ==
Buff background indicates players returning from 2014.

2015 SIUE Cougars roster
#	Name	Position	Bats/Throws	Year	Hometown	High school
0	Maria Prete	Infielder	R/R	Freshman	Westmont, IL	Westmont High School
2	Haley Chambers	Pitcher	L/L	Junior	Coatesville, IN	Cascade HS
3	Alex McDavid	Shortstop	R/R	Senior	Suwanee, GA	North Gwinnett HS
4	Alexis Kohrs	Pitcher	R/R	Sophomore	DuQuoin, IL	DuQuoin HS
5	Rebecca Gray	Outfielder	L/R	Senior	Crete, IL	Marian Catholic HS
6	Kelsey Hansen	Utility/Infield	R/R	Junior	East Peoria, IL	East Peoria Comm. HS
7	Baylee Douglass	Pitcher	L/R	Freshman	Centralia, Missouri	Centralia HS
8	Haley Adrian	Infielder	R/R	Freshman	Auburn, AL	Auburn HS
9	Tess Eby	Catcher	R/R	Freshman	Grapevine, TX	Colleyville Heritage HS
11	Whitney Lanphier	Outfield/3rd Base	R/R	Junior	Plainfield, IL	Plainfield South HS
12	Rachel Keller	1st Base	R/R	Junior	Bethalto, IL	Civic Memorial HS
13	Allison Smiley	2nd Base	R/R	Sophomore	Johnston City, IL	Johnston City HS
22	Amy Hunt	Catcher	R/R	Sophomore	Troy, IL	Triad HS
23	Brittany Toney	Right Fielder	R/R	Senior	Hendersonville, TN	Goodpasture Christian School
25	Allie Hill	Utility/Infielder	R/R	Junior	Bethalto, IL	Civic Memorial HS
26	Jordan LaFave	Outfielder	L/R	Junior	Valrico, FL	Durant HS
31	Samantha Jones	Utility	R/R	Senior	Florissant, Missouri	McCluer North HS

== Schedule ==
Date	Time	Opponent	Rank^{#}	Site	Result	Attendance	Winning Pitcher	Losing Pitcher
Louisiana Tech's Lady Techster Invitational
February 6*	11:45 AM	Abilene Christian		Lady Techster Softball Complex • Ruston, LA	W 8–0^{6}	914	Haley Chambers (1–0)	J. Montoya
February 6*	2:00 PM	Louisiana Tech		Lady Techster Softball Complex • Ruston, LA	W 6–4	914	Alexis Kohrs (1–0)	Bianca Duram
February 7*	1:30 PM	Missouri State		Lady Techster Softball Complex • Ruston, LA	W 3–1	995	Haley Chambers (2–0)	Jessie Van Es
February 7*	8:15 PM	Louisiana–Monroe		Lady Techster Softball Complex • Ruston, LA	L 3–4	995	Paige Porter	Baylee Douglass (0–1)
February 8*	11:15 AM	Arkansas–Pine Bluff		Lady Techster Softball Complex • Ruston, LA	W 11–1^{5}	657	Haley Chambers (3–0)	M. Hunter
Georgia Softball Classic
February 13*	11:30AM	Troy		Jack Turner Stadium • Athens, GA	W 10–0	121	Haley Chambers (4–0)	Sara Mock
February 13*	2:00 PM	#10 Georgia		Jack Turner Stadium • Athens, GA	L 0–9 ^{5}	147	Chelsea Wilkinson	Alexis Kohrs (1–1)
February 14*	9:00 AM	Elon		Jack Turner Stadium • Athens, GA	W 3–2	143	Haley Chambers (5–0)	K. Mitchum
February 14*	2:00 PM	Troy		Jack Turner Stadium • Athens, GA	W 5–2	147	Baylee Douglass (1–1)	Ashley Rainey
February 15*	10:30 AM	#10 Georgia		Jack Turner Stadium • Athens, GA		Cancelled	Cold	Weather
Auburn's Wilson/DeMarini Classic
February 27*	10:00 AM	Connecticut		Jane B. Moore Field • Auburn, AL	L 1–2	n/a	Duggan	Haley Chambers (5–1)
February 27*	12:15 PM	Texas State		Jane B. Moore Field • Auburn, AL	W 10–2^{6}	n/a	Baylee Douglass (2-1)	Taylor Webb
February 28*	2:30 PM	Samford		Jane B. Moore Field • Auburn, AL	W 7–2	n/a	Baylee Douglass (3-1)	Grey Adams
February 28*	5:00 PM	#16 Auburn		Jane B. Moore Field • Auburn, AL	L 5–8	972	L. Davis	Haley Chambers (5–2)
March 1*	11:30 AM	Ohio State		Jane B. Moore Field • Auburn, AL	W 6–0	n/a	Haley Chambers (6–2)	Olivia O'Reilly
USF Series - Under Armour Showcase
March 6*	~~3:15~~ 9:00 PM	Villanova		Eddie C. Moore Complex Field #3 • Clearwater, FL	W 4–1	145	Haley Chambers (7–2)	Jordan Prutzer
March 7*	12:45 PM	Seton Hall		Eddie C. Moore Complex Field #4 • Clearwater, FL	W 5–3	67	Baylee Douglass (4–1)	Destaso
March 7*	3:15 PM	North Florida		Eddie C. Moore Complex Field #4 • Clearwater, FL	W 4–3 ^{12}	n/a	Haley Chambers (8–2)	Kaylie Wallace
March ~~-6-~~ 8*	~~6:30 PM~~ 8:00 AM	Georgetown		Eddie C. Moore Complex Field #2 • Clearwater, FL	W 8–2 ^{8}	55	Baylee Douglass (5–1)	M. Hyson
March 8*	~~8:00 AM~~ 10:15 AM	Bowling Green		Eddie C. Moore Complex Field #9 • Clearwater, FL	W 3–0	55	Haley Chambers (9–2)	Dillow
March 10*	1:30 PM	Pittsburgh		FGCU Softball Complex • Fort Myers, FL	W 1–0	24	Haley Chambers (10–2)	S. King
March 10*	6:00 PM	Florida Gulf Coast		FGCU Softball Complex • Fort Myers, FL	L 0–3	121	Ashley Dobson	Baylee Douglass (5–2)
March 14	~~1:00~~ 3:00 PM	Murray State		Cougar Field • Edwardsville, IL	W 5–4	167	Baylee Douglass (6–2)	CheyAnne Gaskey
March ~~14~~ 15	~~4:00 PM~~ Noon	Murray State		Cougar Field • Edwardsville, IL	L 2–7	193	CheyAnne Gaskey	Haley Chambers (10–3)
March 15	~~1:00~~ 2:00 PM	Murray State		Cougar Field • Edwardsville, IL	W 6–4	193	Baylee Douglass (7–2)	Mason Robinson
March 17*	4:00 PM	Bradley		Cougar Field • Edwardsville, IL	W 6–5	124	Haley Chambers (11–3)	Jaelen Hull
March 21	12:00 Noon	Eastern Kentucky		Gertrude Hood Field • Richmond, KY	W 5–1	292	Haley Chambers (12–3)	Leanna Pittsenbarger
March 21	2:00 PM	Eastern Kentucky		Gertrude Hood Field • Richmond, KY	W 8–0 ^{6}	302	Baylee Douglass (8–2)	Shaylon Robb
March 22	12:00 Noon	Morehead State		University Field • Morehead, KY	W 1–0	140	Haley Chambers (13–3)	M. Grossmann
March 22	2:00 PM	Morehead State		University Field • Morehead, KY	W 10–3	140	Baylee Douglass (9–2)	Tana Sueferer
March 25*	3:00 PM	Missouri State		Cougar Field • Edwardsville, IL	W 3–2	112	Haley Chambers (14–3)	Chelsea Jones
March 28	1:00 PM	Southeast Missouri		Southeast Softball Complex • Cape Girardeau, MO	W 12–3 ^{6}	135	Haley Chambers (15–3)	Aubrey Denno
March 28	3:00 PM	Southeast Missouri		Southeast Softball Complex • Cape Girardeau, MO	W 7–0	155	Baylee Douglass (10–2)	Madeline Krumrey
March 29	1:00 PM	Southeast Missouri		Southeast Softball Complex • Cape Girardeau, MO	W 8–4	225	Haley Chambers (16–3)	Madeline Krumrey
April 1*	4:00 PM	SIU Carbondale		Charlotte West Stadium • Carbondale, IL	L 1–5	239	Katie Bertlesen	Baylee Douglass (10–3)
April 4	1:00 PM	Jacksonville State		Cougar Field • Edwardsville, IL	W 2–1	144	Haley Chambers (17–3)	T. West
April 4	3:00 PM	Jacksonville State		Cougar Field • Edwardsville, IL	W 8–2	144	Baylee Douglass (11–3)	L. Green
April 5	12:00 Noon	Tennessee Tech		Cougar Field • Edwardsville, IL	L 3–4	105	Erica Tuck	Haley Chambers (17–4)
April 5	2:00 PM	Tennessee Tech		Cougar Field • Edwardsville, IL	L 2–4	105	Danielle Liberatore	Baylee Douglass (11–4)
April 7*	3:00 PM	Western Illinois		Mary Ellen McKee Stadium • Macomb, IL		Cancelled	Heavy rain	Forecast
April 7*	5:00 PM	Western Illinois		Mary Ellen McKee Stadium • Macomb, IL		Cancelled	Heavy rain	Forecast
April 11	12:00 Noon	Austin Peay		Cheryl Holt Field • Clarksville, TN	W 2–1	225	Haley Chambers (18–4)	Natalie Ayala
April 11	2:00 PM	Austin Peay		Cheryl Holt Field • Clarksville, TN	W 7–1	225	Baylee Douglass (12–4)	Sidney Hooper
April 12	12:00 Noon	Austin Peay		Cheryl Holt Field • Clarksville, TN	W 5–3	125	Baylee Douglass (13–4)	Natalie Ayala
April 15*	4:00 PM	Saint Louis		Cougar Field • Edwardsville, IL	W 5–0	215	Haley Chambers (19–4)	Briana Lore
April 18	1:00 PM	Belmont		Cougar Field • Edwardsville, IL	W 3–0	168	Haley Chambers (20–4)	Taylor Moon
April 18	3:00 PM	Belmont		Cougar Field • Edwardsville, IL	L 0–2	168	Caroline Snodgress	Baylee Douglass (13–5)
April 19	1:00 PM	Tennessee State		Cougar Field • Edwardsville, IL	W 8–2	155	Baylee Douglass (14–5)	Taylor Green
April 19	3:00 PM	Tennessee State		Cougar Field • Edwardsville, IL		Cancelled	Game 1 began 0:41 late	then had 3:06 rain delay
April 22*	1:00 PM	#rv Kansas		Arrocha Ballpark at Rock Chalk Park • Lawrence, KS	L 4–6	425	Bryn Houlton	Haley Chambers (20–5)
April 25	~~1:00~~ 12:30 PM	UT Martin		Cougar Field • Edwardsville, IL	W 5–3 ^{6 (Rain)}	156	Haley Chambers (21–5)	Elizabeth Wiegand
April 26	~~1:00 PM~~ Noon	UT Martin		Cougar Field • Edwardsville, IL	W 3–0	167	Baylee Douglass (15–5)	Casey Vincent
April ~~25~~ 26	3:00 PM	UT Martin		Cougar Field • Edwardsville, IL	W 3–2	167	Baylee Douglass (16–5)	Elizabeth Wiegand
April 28*	4:00 PM	Saint Louis		The Billiken Sports Center • St. Louis, MO	L 2–7	85	Maddie Baalman	Baylee Douglass (15–6)
May 2	1:00 PM	Eastern Illinois		Williams Field • Charleston, IL	W 7–2	464	Haley Chambers (22–5)	Jessica Wireman
May 2	3:00 PM	Eastern Illinois		Williams Field • Charleston, IL	L 3–4	464	Michelle Rogers	Baylee Douglass (15–7)
May 3	1:00 PM	Eastern Illinois		Williams Field • Charleston, IL	L 0–1 ^{10}	468	Jessica Wireman	Haley Chambers (22–6)
2015 Ohio Valley Conference softball tournament
May 6	5:30 PM	Morehead State		Cougar Field • Edwardsville, IL	W 8–3	344	Haley Chambers (23–6)	Tanna Seuferer
May 7	3:00 PM	Tennessee Tech		Cougar Field • Edwardsville, IL	L 1–4	353	Danielle Liberatore	Haley Chambers (23–7)
May 8	9:00 AM	Eastern Illinois		Cougar Field • Edwardsville, IL	W 10–2 ^{5}	n/a	Haley Chambers (24–7)	Jessica Wireman
May~~-8-~~ 9	~~4:30 PM~~ 10:00 AM	Jacksonville State		Cougar Field • Edwardsville, IL	W 8–0 ^{6}	313	Haley Chambers (25–7)	Taylor West
May 9	~~12:30~~ 4:30 PM	Murray State		Cougar Field • Edwardsville, IL	W 2–1	313	Baylee Douglass (17–7)	CheyAnne Gaskey
May 9	9:51 PM	Tennessee Tech		Cougar Field • Edwardsville, IL	L 2–3	313	Danielle Liberatore	Baylee Douglass (17–8)
*Non-Conference Game. ^{#}Rankings from NFCA released prior to game.All times are in Central Time Zone.
