= 2007 SIU Edwardsville Cougars softball team =

American college softball season

2007 SIU Edwardsville Cougars softball

GLVC Co-Champion GLVC Tournament Champion

NCAA Lewis U. Regional Champion, NCAA Division II National Champion
- Conference: Great Lakes Valley Conference
- Record: 49–8 (19–5 GLVC)
- Head coach: Sandy Montgomery (19th season)
- Assistant coaches: Jessica Jones; Valerie McCoy; Shannon Evans (Grad.)
- Home stadium: Cougar Field; Capacity 1,000+

The 2007 SIU Edwardsville Cougars softball team represented Southern Illinois University Edwardsville during the 2007 NCAA Division II softball season. The Cougars, led by nineteenth year head coach Sandy Montgomery, played their home games at Cougar Field on the SIUE campus as a member of the Great Lakes Valley Conference (GLVC). They finished the season as the NCAA Division II National Champions. In July 2017, the team was elected to the SIUE Athletics Hall of Fame.

== Preseason ==
Despite the loss of graduated 1st Team All-American and GLVC Player of the Year Alicia DeShasier, good things were expected of the Cougars. Thirteen players returned from the 52–11 2006 squad that had played in the Division II Women's College World Series, including 3rd Team All-American and 1st team All-GLCV pitcher Sabra McCune and 1st team All-GLCV shortstop Kaeleigh Rousey, along with All-GLVC 2nd team first baseman Emily Lenart, plus All-GLVC honorable mentions pitcher Kaitlin Colosimo and catcher Libby Lenart.

The Cougars were the No. 5-ranked team in the NFCA/NCAA Division II preseason coaches poll.

== Regular season ==
The season began with the Cougars winning three of five games at the West Georgia Tournament, with both losses to nationally ranked teams. They then won both ends of a doubleheader at Lincoln before going back South to win twelve of thirteen of games at the Rebel Spring Games in Kissimmee, Florida, losing only to St. Cloud State. The GLVC schedule started with a Cougars' loss in the first half of a doubleheader at Kentucky Wesleyan. The loss was followed by a seven-game win streak (five in-conference) before SIUE lost one of two at Wisconsin–Parkside and two at eventual GLVC co-champion Lewis. They followed that up with nine wins in a row before dropping one at Missouri–Rolla, then closing out the GLVC schedule with four more wins.

The regular season ended with an overall record of 37–8 and a GLVC record of 19–5, which tied Lewis for the conference championship.

=== Highlights ===
During the regular season, sophomore Kaitlin Colosimo pitched a no-hit game against Missouri-St. Louis.

Six Cougars were named to the All–Great Lakes Valley Conference teams:

- Catcher Libby Lenart, outfielder Jodie Ohlau, and pitchers Kaitlin Colosimo and Sabra McCune were selected for the All-GLVC 1st Team.
- First baseman Emily Lenart and shortstop Kaeleigh Rousey were named to the All-GLVC 2nd Team.
- Kaitlin Colosimo was also picked as GLVC Pitcher of the Year.

Pitcher Kaitlin Colosimp was named to the Daktronics All-America Softball Third Team. She and outfielder Jodie Ohlau were also members of the Daktrronics Great Lakes All-Region team.

Coach Sandy Montgomery and assistants Valerie McCoy and Shannon Evans were selected as both the Great Lakes Region Coaching Staff of the Year and the 2007 NFCA Division II National Coaching Staff of the Year by the National Fastpitch Coaches Association.

== Postseason ==
The Cougars entered the double-elimination Great Lakes Valley Conference at EastSide Centre in East Peoria, Illinois as the #2 seed.

SIUE beat St. Joseph's in the opening round, Wisconsin–Parkside in the quarterfinals, and top seed Lewis in the first semifinal. After Lewis defeated Missouri–Rolla in the second semifinal, the Cougars won the Final to earn the GLVS's automatic bid to the NCAA Division II Tournament.

The Cougars were the #3 seed at the Great Lakes Regional, hosted by top-seeded Lewis. After SIUE beat Shepherd in the first round, Kaitlin Colosimo pitched her second no-hitter of the season against Wayne State in the quarterfinals. SIUE then bested 4th seed Ferris State in the first semifinal. The regional final matched the Cougars with Grand Valley State, which had won four elimination games after falling to Wayne State in the first round. SIUE scored six runs in the first inning and went on to win the final 10–1 in five innings and advance to the Division II Women's College World Series.

SIUE arrived at the Division II Women's College World Series at Firestone Stadium in Akron, Ohio on a 12-game winning streak. The Cougars continued their winning ways by downing Florida Southern in the opening round and Cal St. Stanislaus in the quarterfinals. In the first semifinal, Kaitlin Colosimo tossed her third no-hitter of the season against the defending champion and top-seeded Lock Haven Bald Eagles. Lock Haven came back to win the elimination bracket semifinal and set up the final. Lock Haven scored one run in the third inning. The Cougars tied in the top half of the fourth only to have the Bald Eagles go back on top with a run in the bottom of the inning. SIUE once more tied the score in the sixth, and the game evolved into a pitching duel between Lock Haven's Kristin Erb and Kaitlin Colosimo, pitching in relief. The Cougars finally managed to score in the top of the twelfth inning, then held on to win the 2007 NCAA Division II Softball Championship.

=== Highlights ===
In the Great Lakes Regional, Kaitlin Colosimo threw her second no-hit game of the season versus Wayne State and was named the Most Outstanding Player of the tournament. She was joined on the All-Tournament Team by outfielders Jodie Ohlau and Courtney Mall, catcher Libby Lenart, and shortstop Kaeleigh Rousey.

In the Women's College World Series, Kaitlin Colosimo threw her third no-hitter against Lock Haven in the first semifinal and was again named the Most Outstanding Player of the tournament. She was joined on the All-Tournament Team by outfielder Jodie Ohlau, catcher Libby Lenart, and shortstop Kaeleigh Rousey.

The National Championship game was the longest ever played, two innings longer than the previous record of ten innings set when Augustana defeated Bloomsburg for the 1991 title.

== Roster ==
2014 SIUE Cougars roster
Pitchers: 7 Lindsey Laas - Junior; 22 Sabra McCune - Senior; 34 Kaitlin Colosimo - Sophomore; Infielders: 5 Emily Lenart - Senior; 15 Haylee Eubanks - Junior; 16 Abbie Bates - Freshman; 21 Lauren Zembruski - Freshman; 24 Amanda Pucel - Sophomore; 26 Kaeleigh Rousey - Junior; 33 Mallory Ruggles - Junior	Catchers: 2 Ashley Price - Junior; 31 Libby Lenart - Senior; Outfielders: 3 Chaleen Rumpf - Freshman; 6 Courtney Mall - Sophomore; 17 Katy Biggs - Senior; 25 Jodie Ohlau - Senior; Utility: 4 Carly Wildenradt - Freshman; 18 Nicole Beecher - Sophomore

== Schedule ==
Date	Time	Opponent	Rank^{#}	Site	Result	Attendance	Winning Pitcher	Losing Pitcher
University of West Georgia Tournament
February 16*	11:00 AM	North Alabama	#5	Maroon Field • Carrollton, Georgia	W 3–1	50	Sabra McCune	Stephanie Glienke
February 16*	1:00 PM	Delta State	#5	Maroon Field • Carrollton, Georgia	W 10–0 ^{5}	50	Kaitlin Colosimo	Britni Adcox
February 17*	n/a	#12 Alabama–Huntsville	#5	Maroon Field • Carrollton, Georgia	L 0–9 ^{5}	50	n/a	Kaitlin Colosimo
February 17*	3:15 PM	#15 Columbus State	#5	Maroon Field • Carrollton, Georgia	L 3–6	50	Amber Browning	Sabra McCune
February 17*	7:15 PM	West Georgia	#5	Maroon Field • Carrollton, Georgia	W 11–3	50	Kaitlin Colosimo	Kasie Crider
February 28*	1:00 PM	Lincoln	#5	LU Softball Field • Jefferson City, Missouri	W 8–0 ^{5}	56	Sabra McCune	N. Nelke
February 28*	2:20 PM	Lincoln	#5	LU Softball Field • Jefferson City, Missouri	W 11–2 ^{5}	56	Lindsey Laas	N. Nelke
Rebel Spring Games @ Kissimmee, Florida
March 4*	1:00 PM	Northwood (FL)	#5	Osceola County #3 • Kissimmee, Florida	W 7–0	54	Sabra McCune	Jessica Wojcik
March 4*	5:00 PM	St. Rose	#5	n/a • Kissimmee, Florida	W 8–0 ^{5}	50	Kaitlin Colosimo	Nicole Welch
March 5*	9:00 AM	Findlay	#5	n/a • Kissimmee, Florida	W 10–2 ^{6}	50	Sabra McCune	Stephanie Heydinger
March 5*	11:20 AM	Ferris State	#5	n/a • Kissimmee, Florida	W 7–3	50	Kaitlin Colosimo	Sarah Mueller
March 7*	9:00 AM	Northern State	#8	n/a • Kissimmee, Florida	W 12–2 ^{6}	50	Lindsey Laas	Christi Schulte
March 7*	11:00 AM	Stonehill	#8	n/a • Kissimmee, Florida	W 9–1 ^{5}	50	Sabra McCune	Katie Mottau
March 8*	1:00 PM	#? Georgian Court	#8	n/a • Kissimmee, Florida	W 3–1	50	Kaitlin Colosimo	Samantha Sasko
March 8*	5:00PM	St. Cloud State	#8	n/a • Kissimmee, Florida	L 1–2	50	Lacey Trossbach	Sabra McCune
March 9*	1:00 PM	St. Rose	#8	n/a • Kissimmee, Florida	W 7–4	50	Kaitlin Colosimo	Kristen Calahan
March 9*	n/a	Lake Superior State	#8	n/a • Kissimmee, Florida	W 8–0 ^{5}	n/a	Sabra McCune	n/a
March 10*	1:00 PM	#? Dowling	#8	n/a • Kissimmee, Florida	W 4–0	50	Kaitlin Colosimo	Jackie Rogers
March 10*	4:30 PM	#? Minnesota State–Mankato	#8	Osceola Field 5 • Kissimmee, Florida	W 4–3	50	Sabra McCune	Meagan Teal
March 14	2:15 PM	Kentucky Wesleyan	#8	Foster Field • Owensboro, Kentucky	L 3–4 ^{10}	75	H. Ashworth	Sabra McCune
March 14	4:40 PM	Kentucky Wesleyan	#8	Foster Field • Owensboro, Kentucky	W 9–1 ^{6}	75	Kaitlin Colosimo	Jamie Ogles
March 24	12 Noon	Quincy	#7	Cougar Field • Edwardsville, Illinois	W 5–1	95	Sabra McCune	Sarah Ormond
March 24	1:40 PM	Quincy	#7	Cougar Field • Edwardsville, Illinois	W 10–2 ^{5}	125	Kaitlin Colosimo	Korby Paul
March 25	12 Noon	Missouri–St. Louis	#7	Cougar Field • Edwardsville, Illinois	W 4–2	100	Sabra McCune	Dana Essner
March 25	1:40 PM	Missouri–St. Louis	#7	Cougar Field • Edwardsville, Illinois	W 8–0 ^{5}	100	Kaitlin Colosimo	Emily Wagoner
March 28*	3:00 PM	Central Missouri	#5	Cougar Field • Edwardsville, Illinois	W 5–4	75	Sabra McCune	Lauren Young
March 28*	5:10 PM	Central Missouri	#5	Cougar Field • Edwardsville, Illinois	W 3–0	100	Kaitlin Colosimo	Lindsey Wagaman
March 31	12:40 PM	Wisconsin–Parkside	#5	Case Complex • Kenosha, Wisconsin	L 0–3	28	-?- Shimkus	Sabra McCune
March 31	2:50 PM	Wisconsin–Parkside	#5	Case Complex • Kenosha, Wisconsin	W 6–1	71	Kaitlin Colosimo	-?- Bryant
April 1	12 Noon	#15 Lewis	#5	Lewis Softball Field • Romeoville, Illinois	L 1–2	85	-?- Lyons	Sabra McCune
April 1	2:00 PM	#15 Lewis	#5	Lewis Softball Field • Romeoville, Illinois	L 2–3 ^{8}	85	-?- Lyons	Kaitlin Colosimo
April 6	2:00 PM	Bellarmine	#13	Cougar Field • Edwardsville, Illinois	W 2–1	70	Kaitlin Colosimo	Clare Horstman
April 6	4:00 PM	Bellarmine	#13	Cougar Field • Edwardsville, Illinois	W 5–1	70	Sabra McCune	Sharon Brill
April 7	12 Noon	Northern Kentucky	#13	Cougar Field • Edwardsville, Illinois	W 4–3 ^{8}	70	Kaitlin Colosimo	Amanda Smith
April 7	2:25 PM	Northern Kentucky	#13	Cougar Field • Edwardsville, Illinois	W 10–1 ^{5}	70	Kaitlin Colosimo	Candace White
April 10	1:00 PM	Southern Indiana	#13	Cougar Field • Edwardsville, Illinois	W 3–1	50	Kaitlin Colosimo	Amy Harrison
April 10	2:45	Southern Indiana	#13	Cougar Field • Edwardsville, Illinois	W 5–4 ^{9}	50	Kaitlin Colosimo	Amy Harrison
April 21	12 Noon	Rockhurst	#10	Loyola Park • Kansas City, Missouri	W 6–1	50	Sabra McCune	Heather Robertson
April 21	1:30 PM	Rockhurst	#10	Loyola Park • Kansas City, Missouri	W 9–0 ^{5}	50	Kaitlin Colosimo	Erica Stone
April 22	12 Noon	Missouri–Rolla	#10	UMR Softball Field • Rolla, Missouri	W 2–1 ^{9}	60	Kaitlin Colosimo	n/a
April 22	12:25	Missouri–Rolla	#10	UMR Softball Field • Rolla, Missouri	L 0–8 ^{5}	60	Ashley Wallingford	Kaitlin Colosimo
April 28	12 Noon	Indianapolis	#12	Cougar Field • Edwardsville, Illinois	W 5–3	100	Sabra McCune	Amanda Wendlinger
April 28	1:50 PM	Indianapolis	#12	Cougar Field • Edwardsville, Illinois	W 2–0	100	Kaitlin Colosimo	Megan Russell
April 29	12 Noon	St. Joseph's	#12	Cougar Field • Edwardsville, Illinois	W 5–0	145	Sabra McCune	n/a
April 29	2:00 PM	St. Joseph's	#12	Cougar Field • Edwardsville, Illinois	W 9–1 ^{6}	145	Kaitlin Colosimo	Jessie Privett
Great Lakes Valley Conference Tournament
May 4	3:10 PM	St. Joseph's	#13	EastSide Centre • East Peoria, Illinois	W 3–1 ^{8}	100	Kaitlin Colosimo	Sara Somogyi
May 4	7:00 PM	Wisconsin–Parkside	#13	EastSide Centre • East Peoria, Illinois	W 3–1	100	Kaitlin Colosimo	-?- Shimkus
May 5	3:00 PM	#7 Lewis	#13	EastSide Centre • East Peoria, Illinois	W 5–0	100	Kaitlin Colosimo	-?- Lyons
May 6	1:00 PM	#7 Lewis	#13	EastSide Centre • East Peoria, Illinois	W 6–2	150	Sabra McCune	-?- Lyons
NCAA Division II Great Lakes Regional
May 10*	12 Noon	Shepherd	#5	Lewis Softball Field • Romeoville, Illinois	W 3–0	125	Sabra McCune	Alicia Brandenburg
May 11*	2:15 PM	Wayne State	#5	Lewis Softball Field • Romeoville, Illinois	W 4–0	225	Kaitlin Colosimo	Molly Yetman
May 12*	3:00 PM	Ferris State	#5	Lewis Softball Field • Romeoville, Illinois	W 6–4	250	Sabra McCune	Sarah Mueller
May 13*	3:00 PM	Grand Valley State	#5	Lewis Softball Field • Romeoville, Illinois	W 10–1 ^{5}	275	Kaitlin Colosimo	Stephanie Cole
NCAA Division II Women's College World Series
May 17*	5:00 PM	#? Florida Southern	#5	Firestone Stadium • Akron, Ohio	W 3–1	208	Kaitlin Colosimo	Megan Brown
May 18*	7:45 PM	#? Cal State–Stanislaus	#5	Firestone Stadium • Akron, Ohio	W 1–0	202	Sabra McCune	Omaira Estremera
May 19*	5:25 PM	#1 Lock Haven	#5	Firestone Stadium • Akron, Ohio	W 4–0	211	Kaitlin Colosimo	Kristin Erb
May 21*	11:05 AM	#1 Lock Haven	#5	Firestone Stadium • Akron, Ohio	W 3–2 ^{12}	204	Kaitlin Colosimo	Kristin Erb
*Non-Conference Game. ^{#}Rankings from NFCA released prior to game.All times are in Central Time Zone.
