= Whitten Soccer Complex =

Soccer complex in Nashville, Tennessee

Coordinates: 36.1338°N 86.7932°W

The Whitten Soccer Complex was the on-campus soccer complex for the Belmont Bruins of Belmont University in Nashville, Tennessee, the largest Christian university in Tennessee.

The facility was a Bermuda grass based field surrounded by a walking track, which had bleacher seating for 500 spectators plus standing room if needed.

It was replaced by the field at E. S. Rose Park in 2012.
