= 2026 Conference USA softball tournament =

- Teams: 8
- Format: Double-elimination tournament
- Finals site: Delaware Softball Diamond; Newark, Delaware
- Champions: Jacksonville State (1st title)
- Winning coach: Julie Boland (1st title)
- MVP: Morgan Nowakowski (Jacksonville State)
- Television: ESPN+, CBSSN

2026 Conference USA softball standings
	Conf.				Overall
Team	W		L	PCT	W		L	PCT
Jacksonville State ‍†‍‡‍^{y}	24	–	3	.889	45	–	16	.738
Western Kentucky ‍‍‍	19	–	8	.704	39	–	14	.736
Liberty ‍‍‍	18	–	9	.667	29	–	28	.509
Delaware ‍‍‍	17	–	10	.630	31	–	24	.564
FIU ‍‍‍	16	–	11	.593	34	–	18	.654
New Mexico State ‍‍‍	16	–	11	.593	27	–	27	.500
Louisiana Tech ‍‍‍	15	–	12	.556	31	–	25	.554
Sam Houston ‍‍‍	13	–	14	.481	29	–	27	.518
Missouri State ‍‍‍	10	–	17	.370	22	–	28	.440
Middle Tennessee ‍‍‍	7	–	20	.259	21	–	30	.412
UTEP ‍‍‍	4	–	23	.148	12	–	37	.245
Kennesaw State ‍‍‍	3	–	24	.111	7	–	43	.140
† – Conference champion ‡ – Tournament champion y – Invited to the NCAA tournament As of May 17, 2026; Rankings from NFCA/USA Today

The 2026 Conference USA softball tournament was held at Delaware Softball Diamond on the campus of University of Delaware in Newark, Delaware from May 6 through May 9, 2026. The tournament was won by the Jacksonville State Gamecocks, who earned Conference USA's automatic bid to the 2026 NCAA Division I softball tournament.

== Format and seeding ==
The top eight finishers of the league's twelve teams from the regular season qualified for the tournament. The bottom four seeds played an opening single elimination round, while the top four seeds and winners of the opening round played a double-elimination tournament.

== Tournament ==
=== Opening round ===
Wednesday, May 6
Team	R
#8 Sam Houston	0
#5 New Mexico State	3
Notes: Sam Houston eliminated

Wednesday, May 6
Team	R
#7 Louisiana Tech	2^{(8)}
#6 FIU	1
Notes: FIU eliminated

=== Bracket ===
Upper round 1
4	Delaware	11
5	New Mexico State	7
3	Liberty	9^{(5)}
7	Louisiana Tech	0
Lower round 1
5	New Mexico State	1
7	Louisiana Tech	3
4	Delaware	3
2	Western Kentucky	4

Upper round 2
1	Jacksonville State	7
4	Delaware	0
2	Western Kentucky	0
3	Liberty	3
Lower round 2
7	Louisiana Tech	2
2	Western Kentucky	5

Upper final
1	Jacksonville State	2
3	Liberty	7
Lower final
1	Jacksonville State	5
2	Western Kentucky	2

Final
3	Liberty	2	4
1	Jacksonville State	5	7

== All Tournament Team ==
Position	Player	Team
C	Savannah Jessee	Liberty
DP	Amber Reed	Jacksonville State
INF	Jaci Underwood	Jacksonville State
INF	Savanah Whatley	Liberty
INF	Anna Mauck	Western Kentucky
INF	Bradi Gallaway	Louisiana Tech
OF	**Morgan Nowakowski**	Jacksonville State
OF	Haleigh Cushingberry	Jacksonville State
OF	Brynn McManus	Liberty
P	Mackinley Portilllo	Jacksonville State
P	Camden Anders	Liberty
P	Erica Houge	Western Kentucky

MVP in bold
