= Sandy Montgomery =

American softball coach (active 1985-)

Current position
- Title: Head coach
- Team: SIU Edwardsville Cougars
- Conference: Ohio Valley Conference
- Record: 41–13 (2017)

Biographical details
- Education: SIU Edwardsville, BS 1986, MS 1988

Playing career
- 1982–85: SIU Edwardsville Cougars (1982 AIAW DII WCWS National Runner-up)
- Position: Pitcher

Coaching career (HC unless noted)
- 1986–88: SIU Edwardsville (Asst.)
- 1989–present: SIU Edwardsville

Administrative career (AD unless noted)
- pre-2007–present: SIU Edwardsville; Currently Associate AD for Alumni Relations

Head coaching record
- Overall: 1051–540–2
- Tournaments: 0–2 NCAA Div. I (1); 26–21 NCAA Div. II (11)

Accomplishments and honors

Championships
- NCAA Division II (2007); 2x NCAA Great Lakes Regional Champions (2006, 2007); OVC Tournament (2014); OVC season (2015); OVC West Division season (2014); 5x GLVC Tournament (2002, 2003, 2006, 2007, 2008); 5x GLVC season (1999, 2002, 2003, 2006, 2007); 2x GLVC Southwest Division season (1997, 1998)

Awards
- NCAA Division I Independent Coach of the Year (2009); OVC Coach of the Year (2015); DII National Coaching Staff of the Year (2007); 3x DII Regional Coaching Staff of the Year (2003, 2006, 2007); 4x GLVC Coach of the Year (1997, 1999, 2001, 2002); National Fastpitch Coaches Association All-Central Region (1985); Illinois Amateur Softball Association Hall of Fame (2001); SIUE Athletics Hall of Fame (2006 - Player); St. Louis Sports Hall of Fame (2019); NFCA Hall of Fame (2022); Ohio Valley Conference Hall of Fame (2023); SIUE Athletics Hall of Fame (2026 - Coach)

Records
- Most wins in SIUE history (985)

Sandy Montgomery is an American softball coach. In 30 years as the head coach of SIU Edwardsville Cougars softball (1989–present), she has more than 1000 career wins, more than any other coach in SIUE history in any sport, male or female. As of May 13, 2017, Montgomery had a career record of 1051 wins, 540 losses, and 2 ties, for a .660 winning percentage. She led the Cougars to the Division II NCAA softball championship in 2007. In 2014, Montgomery passed the 900 win mark while leading the Cougars to their first Division I NCAA Division I softball tournament. Montgomery is the longest-tenured head coach at SIUE and the Associate AD for Alumni Relations in the SIUE athletic department. In addition to coaching softball, she began the SIUE volleyball program in 1995 and coached for its first four years, guiding it to a record of 83–54 and its first appearance in the NCAA Division II tournament in 1998. After leading the softball Cougars to the regular season title, Montgomery was named the 2015 Ohio Valley Conference Coach of the Year. Montgomery's players earned her 1000th career victory in a 4–2 win over the Holy Cross Crusaders in the "Under Armour Showcase" in Clearwater, Florida on March 10, 2017. She became only the 32nd head coach in all divisions to top the 1,000 win mark.

== SIUE pitcher ==
Primary source:

Sandy Montgomery was a pitcher for the SIUE Cougars from 1982 through 1985 building a record of 84–26 in 117 appearances, including 108 starts. On the Cougars' career pitching records lists, she remains #1 in lowest earned run average (ERA) (0.85 in 789 innings), saves (11, including saves in games she started, was relieved, and returned), shutouts (42), and no-hitters (6). She also remains #2 in most batters faced (3210), #3 in wins and innings pitched, and #4 in strikeouts, appearances, and games started,. Additionally, she still holds the Cougars' single-season records for most shutouts (19 in 1985) and saves (7 also in 1985) while remaining among the leaders in wins, lowest ERA, appearances, games started, shutouts, innings pitched, strikeouts, batters faced, and saves. In her senior season (1985), Montgomery had a record of 30-8 with a 0.64 earned run average, was the Cougars' Most Valuable Player, and was named to the National Fastpitch Coaches Association’s All-Central Region team. For her play, she has been inducted into the Illinois Amateur Softball Association’s Hall of Fame (2001) and the SIUE Athletics Hall of Fame (2006).

== Head coaching record ==
Record table
Season	Team	Overall	Conference	Standing	Postseason
SIU Edwardsville (Division II Independent) (1989–1995)
1989	SIUE Cougars	35–24–1			
1990	SIUE Cougars	34–13			NCAA Regional
1991	SIUE Cougars	35–16			
1992	SIUE Cougars	22–21			
1993	SIUE Cougars	23–24			
1994	SIUE Cougars	18–25–1			
1995	SIUE Cougars	24–19			
SIU Edwardsville (Great Lakes Valley Conference (Div. II)) (1996–2008)
1996	SIUE Cougars	34–17	12–6	2nd	
1997	SIUE Cougars	39–13	23–0	1st Southwest	
1998	SIUE Cougars	33–23	22–5	1st Southwest	NCAA Regional
1999	SIUE Cougars	33–17	13–3	1st	
2000	SIUE Cougars	39–19	16–6	t-3rd	NCAA Regional
2001	SIUE Cougars	41–17	17–5	2nd	NCAA Regional
2002	SIUE Cougars	51–12	17–2	1st	NCAA Regional
2003	SIUE Cougars	44–11	17–3	1st	NCAA Regional
2004	SIUE Cougars	35–19	15–5	3rd	NCAA Regional
2005	SIUE Cougars	41–15	15–3	3rd	NCAA Regional
2006	SIUE Cougars	52–11	16–4	1st	Div. II WCWS
2007	SIUE Cougars	49–8	19–5	t-1st	NCAA Div. II Champion
2008	SIUE Cougars	49–11	19–5	2nd	NCAA Regional
SIU Edwardsville (Division I Independent) (2009–2010)
2009	SIUE Cougars	40–10			
2010	SIUE Cougars	27–24			
SIU Edwardsville (Ohio Valley Conference) (2011–current)
2011	SIUE Cougars	28–30	19–11	4th	
2012	SIUE Cougars	23–29	13–16	8th	
2013	SIUE Cougars	35–13	17–5	2nd West	
2014	SIUE Cougars	30–23	19–5	1st West	NCAA Regional
2015	SIUE Cougars	43–16	20–6	1st	
2016	SIUE Cougars	28–26	15–11	4th	
2017	SIUE Cougars	41–13	13–5	t-2nd	
Total:		1051–540–2 .660	322–100 .752		
National champion Postseason invitational champion Conference regular season champion Conference regular season and conference tournament champion Division regular season champion Division regular season and conference tournament champion Conference tournament champion
