= E. S. Rose Park =

Sports facility in Nashville, Tennessee, US

- Interactive map of E. S. Rose Park
- Location: 1000 Edgehill Avenue, Nashville, Tennessee, US
- Coordinates: 36.142867°N 86.78297°W
- Owner: Nashville Metro Parks & Recreation Board
- Capacity: Baseball: 750; Soccer/Track & Field: 300; Softball: 250
- Surface: Artificial turf (baseball and soccer); Natural grass (softball)
- Field size: 330 ft. (LF); 400 ft. (CF); 330 ft. (RF) (baseball)
- Acreage: 25 acres (10 ha)

Construction
- Renovated: 2010–2011
- Cost: $8 million (2010–2011 renovations)

Tenants
- Belmont Bruins baseball, softball, men's and women's soccer, men's and women's track & field (NCAA D1 OVC) (2011–present); Hume-Fogg High School baseball (2012–present); Nashville Metros (2012)

E. S. Rose Park is a baseball, softball, soccer, and track & field venue in Nashville, Tennessee, United States. It is home to Nashville Union FC and Belmont Bruins baseball, softball, men's and women's soccer, and men's and women's track & field teams of the NCAA Division I Ohio Valley Conference. It is located approximately five minutes from Belmont University's main campus. The city-owned park was renovated extensively in 2010–2011.

== History ==
Prior to the renovation of Rose Park, Belmont's outdoor sports programs used a variety of facilities around Nashville, including Shelby Park and Herschel Greer Stadium in the case of the baseball team. The soccer teams played on campus at the Whitten Soccer Complex. In 2007, the university began to explore options for a new, multi-use athletic facility in Nashville's Edgehill neighborhood. The proposals met with resistance from residents of the neighborhood, who cited concerns about noise, increased traffic levels, and the loss of park use for local residents. Belmont responded with promises to share access to the facility. After years of discussions, the neighborhood agreed to the facility's construction, and the university agreed to create scholarships for Edgehill residents and to help sponsor local baseball and softball leagues. Between 2010 and 2011, the park underwent $8 million in renovations.

The park opened in April 2011. Belmont's softball team won Rose Park's first game, 1–0 over North Florida, on April 8, 2011. The Belmont baseball team lost its first-ever game in the facility, 7–5 to Austin Peay, on April 26, 2011.

== Other uses ==
Local baseball, softball, and soccer leagues also use Rose Park. The Nashville Metros, a local soccer club with 24 years of history, played their final season at Rose Park before folding after their 2012 season.

== See also ==
- List of NCAA Division I baseball venues
