= SIU Edwardsville Cougars softball =

SIU Edwardsville Cougars
- Founded: 1974
- University: Southern Illinois University Edwardsville
- Athletic director: Derrick Brown (interim)
- Head coach: Ben Sorden (2nd season season)
- Conference: OVC
- Location: Edwardsville, Illinois, US
- Home stadium: Cougar Field aka Cougar Stadium (capacity: 800+)
- Nickname: Cougars
- Colors: Red and white

NCAA Tournament champions
- D II: 2007

NCAA WCWS appearances
- D II: 2006, 2007

AIAW WCWS appearances
- D II: 1980, 1982

NCAA Tournament appearances
- D I: 2014; D II: 1985, 1988, 1990, 1998, 2000, 2001, 2002, 2003, 2004, 2005, 2006, 2007, 2008

Conference tournament championships
- OVC: 2014; GLVC: 2002, 2003, 2006, 2007, 2008

Regular-season conference championships
- OVC: 2015; OVC West Div.: 2014; GLVC: 1997, 1998, 1999, 2002, 2003, 2006, 2007; GLVC SW Div.:1997, 1998

The SIU Edwardsville Cougars softball team represents Southern Illinois University Edwardsville in NCAA Division I college softball. They compete as members of the Ohio Valley Conference. SIUE plays its home games at Cougar Field, located in the southwest corner of the campus.

== History ==
Through 2018, the SIUE softball team had had only two head coaches in its history.

The program was begun by Cindy Jones in 1974–75. In fourteen seasons, Jones' teams were 376–201, with two trips to the Association for Intercollegiate Athletics for Women Division II National Tournament and two invitations to the NCAA Division II Softball Championship tournament while competing as a Division II independent.

Coach Sandy Montgomery took over the Cougars in 1989, with SIUE continuing as an independent and earning its third invitation to the Division II playoffs before joining the Great Lakes Valley Conference (GLVC) in 1996. In thirteen seasons as members of the GLVC, the Cougars won or shared seven regular season division or conference titles and five conference tournament championships. They earned ten trips to the NCAA Division II playoffs, including two spots in the Division II College World Series, and won the NCAA Division II National Softball Championship in 2007.

In 2008–09, SIUE athletics began the transition into Division I, and the Cougars joined the Ohio Valley Conference (OVC) in 2011.

On April 9, 2014, the Cougars defeated the Saint Louis Billikens 4–1 at SLU. The win was Coach Sandy Montgomery's 900th coaching win, making her the 39th coach in NCAA softball history to reach that milestone. Coach Montgomery's record since assuming the reins in 1989 through the end of the 2014 regular season is 914–462–2.

On May 10, 2014, the softball Cougars became the first SIUE team to win an OVC championship in any sport. Rain and thunderstorms shortened the tournament, played at University Field at Jacksonville State, with the losers bracket being cancelled, while the 2nd seeded Cougars and the 4th seeded Murray State Racers were the last two undefeated teams. The Cougars scored early, with four home runs in the first two innings, and defeated the Racers 12–1, with the game halted after 6 innings by the mercy rule. The squad also became the first SIUE team to qualify for an NCAA Division I tournament since the 1982 men's soccer team, when that sport had been the university's only Division I program before the school's transition to Division I for all sports began in 2008.

In late July 2018, Sandy Montgomery suddenly announced her early retirement. Assistant coach Jessica Jones was named as interim head coach for the 2019 season.

On August 24, 2022, Coach Ben Sorden was named the new Cougars head softball coach.

== Records by year ==
Record table
Season	Coach	Overall	Conference	Standing	Postseason
SIU Edwardsville (Division II Independent) (1975–1985)
1975	Cindy Jones	10–9			
1976	Cindy Jones	4–11			
1977	Cindy Jones	16–9			
1978	Cindy Jones	15–10			
1979	Cindy Jones	15–16			
1980	Cindy Jones	36–20			AIAW DII WCWS (t-9th)
1981	Cindy Jones	30–14			
1982	Cindy Jones	39–20			AIAW DII WCWS National Runner-up
1983	Cindy Jones	33–17			
1984	Cindy Jones	38–8			
1985	Cindy Jones	40–13			NCAA Regional
1986	Cindy Jones	25–22			
1987	Cindy Jones	36–19			
1988	Cindy Jones	39–13			NCAA Regional
Cindy Jones:		376–201 .652			
1989	Sandy Montgomery	35–24–1			
1990	Sandy Montgomery	34–13			NCAA Regional
1991	Sandy Montgomery	35–16			
1992	Sandy Montgomery	22–21			
1993	Sandy Montgomery	23–24			
1994	Sandy Montgomery	18–25–1			
1995	Sandy Montgomery	24–19			
SIU Edwardsville (Great Lakes Valley Conference (Div. II)) (1996–2008)
1996	Sandy Montgomery	34–17	12–6	2nd	
1997	Sandy Montgomery	39–13	23–0	1st Southwest	
1998	Sandy Montgomery	33–23	22–5	1st Southwest	NCAA Regional
1999	Sandy Montgomery	33–17	13–3	1st	
2000	Sandy Montgomery	39–19	16–6	t-3rd	NCAA Regional
2001	Sandy Montgomery	41–17	17–5	2nd	NCAA Regional
2002	Sandy Montgomery	51–12	17–2	1st	NCAA Regional
2003	Sandy Montgomery	44–11	17–3	1st	NCAA Regional
2004	Sandy Montgomery	35–19	15–5	3rd	NCAA Regional
2005	Sandy Montgomery	41–15	15–3	3rd	NCAA Regional
2006	Sandy Montgomery	52–11	16–4	1st	Div. II WCWS
2007	Sandy Montgomery	49–8	19–5	t-1st	NCAA Div. II Champion
2008	Sandy Montgomery	49–11	19–5	2nd	NCAA Regional
SIU Edwardsville (Division I Independent) (2009–2010)
2009	Sandy Montgomery	40–10			
2010	Sandy Montgomery	27–24			
SIU Edwardsville (Ohio Valley Conference) (2011–current)
2011	Sandy Montgomery	28–30	19–11	4th	
2012	Sandy Montgomery	23–29	13–16	8th	
2013	Sandy Montgomery	35–13	17–5	2nd West	
2014	Sandy Montgomery	30–23	19–5	1st West	NCAA Regional
2015	Sandy Montgomery	43–16	20–6	1st	
2016	Sandy Montgomery	28–26	15–11	4th	
2017	Sandy Montgomery	41–13	13–3	t-2nd	
2018	Sandy Montgomery	25–21	14–8	5th	
Sandy Montgomery:		1,051–540–2 .660	336–108 .757		
2019	Jessica Jones	16–28	8–14	8th	
Jessica Jones:		16–28 .852	8–14 .364		
Total:		1,415–743–2 .656	336–108		
National champion Postseason invitational champion Conference regular season champion Conference regular season and conference tournament champion Division regular season champion Division regular season and conference tournament champion Conference tournament champion

== All–Americans ==
Through the years, fifteen Cougar softball players were named Division II All–Americans:

- 1981 – Denise Schaake
- 1982 – Amy Frey
- 1984 – Kathy Byrne
- 1988 – Laura McCune
- 1991 – Michele Cleeton
- 2000 – Erin Newman & Katie Waldo
- 2001 – Valerie McCoy & Erin Newman
- 2002 – Valerie McCoy
- 2003 – Jenny Esker & Holly Neuerburg
- 2006 – Alicia DeShasier & Sabra McCune
- 2007 – Kaitlin Colosimo

In 2017, Haley Chambers-Book became the Cougars' first Division I All-American.
