= Morehead State bowling =

Dating back to the mid-1960s, with intercollegiate competition beginning in 1977, bowling at Morehead State University is a club sport and is affiliated with the collegiate division of the United States Bowling Congress.

== Facility ==
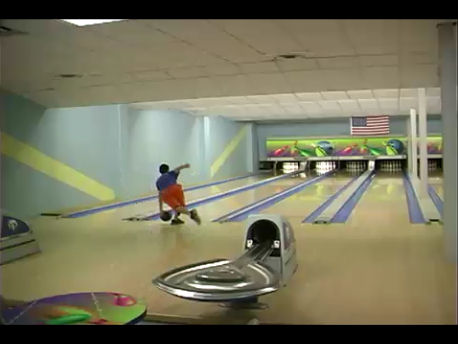
Laughlin Bowling

The Larry Wilson University Lanes, built in 1967, are housed in the Laughlin Health Building on the campus of Morehead State University. The six-lane center, open to the campus community, serves as the practice facility for the MSU bowling teams.

During the 2006-2007 academic year, the center was completely remodeled. The lanes are now equipped with Brunswick A-2 pin spotters and were resurfaced with the state-of-the-art Kegel Edge synthetic lane surface. The Larry Wilson University Lanes are one of two bowling facilities in the United States to use this surface. The settee and counter areas were refurbished with new flooring, lighting, and furniture. New masking units were added as well.

The lanes are maintained using the Kegel Phoenix-S. This machine is capable of having oil patterns uploaded, allowing the teams to prepare on patterns more similar to tournament conditions.

Adjacent to the Larry Wilson University Lanes is a team room to be used for storage of equipment by bowling team members as well as pro shop equipment.

In 2009 the facility acquired a fully functional pro-shop to aid the MSU bowling team in getting all of their equipment drilled without having to travel to any surrounding bowling center. The center is also USBC Sanctioned.

Also over the summer, the old pins were replaced with the new synthetic Twister Pins.

== National Championships and Other Accomplishments ==
=== Women ===
The MSU women have won national championships in 1989, 1998, 2000 and 2002, were runners-up in 1993, and finished in third place in 2006 and 2008. Since 2002, the Morehead State women's bowling team has finished in the top 10 six times, from the 2002-2003 season up to the 2007-2008 season.

=== Men ===
Since 2002, the Morehead State men's bowling team has finished in the top 10 in 2002–2003 and 2004–2005 seasons. The men's squad was runner-up in its 2003 tournament and took third place in 2005. The Morehead State men's team also made a trip to nationals in 2016 in Wichita, Kansas.

== Notable alumni ==
Current and former Eagle bowlers represent the best that the sport has to offer.

- Alum Kelly Kulick was named 2006 Female Bowler of the Year by the Bowling Writers Association of America.
- Morehead State bowlers have been named First Team All-Americans eighteen times:
  - Lindsey Coulles (2005–06)
  - Robin Crawford (1997–98, 2000–01)
  - Vicki Ghrist (1993–94, 1994–95)
  - Liz Johnson (1992–93)
  - Scott Johnson (1987–88)
  - Kelly Kulick (1996–97, 1997–98, 1998–99)
  - Kari Murph (1990–91, 1991–92)
  - Jon Murph (1991–92)
  - Sharon Owen (1986–87, 1987–88, 1988–89)
  - Penny Parker (1997–98)
  - Sheri Pohlad (1992–93).

Four MSU bowlers have represented the United States of America in international competition as members of Team USA: Joy Esterson (2004), Liz Johnson (1994–96, 2008–present), Kelly Kulick (1998–2001, 2008–present), and David O'Sullivan (2007). Members of Junior Team USA have also included three Eagles: Lindsey Coulles (2003–04), Joy Esterson (2003), and David O'Sullivan (2004). Former Lady Eagle Robin (Crawford) Orlikowski represents her native country as a member of Team Canada (2000–present).
