= Plainfield South High School =

Public school in Illinois, United States

Location
- 7800 W. Caton Farm Road; Plainfield address, Illinois 60586; United States; 41.5626°N 88.2726°W

Information
- Type: Public High School
- Established: August 2001
- School district: Plainfield Community Consolidated School District 202
- Superintendent: Glenn Wood
- Principal: Lisa Smith
- Staff: 138.70 (FTE)
- Faculty: 242
- Grades: 9-12
- Enrollment: 2,379 (2023-2024)
- Student to teacher ratio: 17.15
- Campus: Suburban
- Colors: Navy Blue, White,
- Mascot: Cougar
- Newspaper: The Paw Print
- Communities served: Plainfield, Joliet, Unincorporated Will County
- Feeder schools: Drauden Point Middle School and Aux Sable Middle School
- Rival Schools: Plainfield North High School; Plainfield Central High School; Plainfield East High School
- Website: Plainfield South High School

Plainfield South High School, or PSHS, is a four-year public high school located in Joliet, Illinois, a southwest suburb of Chicago, Illinois, in the United States. It is part of the Plainfield Community Consolidated School District 202, which also includes three other high schools: Plainfield Central High School, Plainfield North High School and Plainfield East High School. The school's address, phone number, and school district belong to Plainfield, however, the school is within the Joliet city limits.

== History ==
The name was chosen to be in keeping with the theme of the other district high schools. Elizabeth Eichelberger, a member of the Plainfield school district board, stated that no individuals or entities contacted her asking that the school be given a name that does not have Plainfield in it, and according to Eichelberger, most students and parents believed that the school should have a name with "Plainfield" in it.

== Staff and Administration ==
The first principal, Thomas A. Hensel, served from the opening of the school until 2004. The second principal was Dan Goggins who served 2004-2010. The third principal David Travis served 2010-2015. The fourth principal of Plainfield South High School was Bob Yanello who served 2015-2023, and the fifth and current principal of Plainfield South High School is Lisa Smith who served since 2023.

The current associate principal is Fernando Nieto, the assistant principals are Bill Bicker (discipline) and Karla Ortiz (student services), and the special education administrator is Michael Phillipps.

== Campus ==
The school is located on the corner of Caton Farm Road and Ridge Road. The school has over 200 classrooms. Facilities include a fieldhouse, an auditorium, a competition gymnasium, and a cafeteria. A 4000-seat stadium, baseball and softball diamonds, tennis courts, and a track are among outdoor facilities.

== Athletics ==
Fall Sports	Winter Sports	Spring Sports
Boys Cross Country	Boys Basketball	Boys Baseball
Girl Cross Country	Boys Wrestling	Boys Tennis
Football	Girls Basketball	Boys Track & Field
Boys Golf	Girls Bowling	Boys Volleyball
Boys Soccer	Boys Bowling	Girls Badminton
Girls Golf	Boys Swimming and Diving	Girls Soccer
Girls Swimming and Diving	Poms/Dance	Girls Softball
Girls Tennis	Cheer	Girls Track & Field
Girls Volleyball		

The 2010 Boys' Bowling Team won the state championship, the first school in District 202 history to win a state title in any sport. The track team has had recent success, winning sixth place in the state finals in 2010. In the summer of 2016 and 2018, the school baseball team won the Summer State Championship. Plainfield South won the 2022 3A Boys State Cross Country Championship.
