= Morehead State Eagles =

Collegiate sports club in the United States

- University: Morehead State University
- Conference: OVC (primary); PFL (football)
- NCAA: Division I (FCS)
- Athletic director: Kelly Wells
- Location: Morehead, Kentucky
- Varsity teams: 17
- Football stadium: Phil Simms Stadium
- Basketball arena: Ellis Johnson Arena
- Baseball stadium: Allen Field
- Softball stadium: University Field
- Mascot: Beaker
- Nickname: Eagles
- Fight song: Fight, Fight, Fight for Morehead
- Colors: Blue and gold
- Website: msueagles.com

The Morehead State Eagles are the athletic teams that represent Morehead State University (MSU), located in Morehead, Kentucky, United States, in intercollegiate sports as a member of the NCAA Division I ranks (for football, the Football Championship Subdivision), primarily competing in the Ohio Valley Conference (OVC) since the 1948–49 academic year; while its football team competes in the Pioneer Football League (PFL). The Eagles previously competed in the Kentucky Intercollegiate Athletic Conference (KIAC; now known as the River States Conference (RSC) since the 2016–17 school year) of the National Association of Intercollegiate Athletics (NAIA) from 1933–34 to 1947–48; and in the defunct West Virginia Intercollegiate Athletic Conference (WVIAC) from 1929–30 to 1932–33.

== Mascot and colors ==
The eagle mascot is named Beaker, and the school colors are blue and gold.

== Varsity teams ==
Morehead State competes in 17 intercollegiate varsity sports: Men's sports baseball, basketball, cross country, football, golf and track & field; while women's include basketball, beach volleyball, cross country, golf, soccer, softball, track & field and volleyball; and co-ed sports include cheerleading, dance and rifle.

With 2017–18 being its initial season and the OVC not yet sponsoring the sport, the beach volleyball team will compete as an independent. The football team competes as a member of the Pioneer Football League, a non-scholarship Division I (FCS) league.

Men's sports	Women's sports
Baseball	Basketball
Basketball	Beach volleyball
Bowling	Bowling
Cross country	Cross country
Football	Golf
Golf	Soccer
Track and field^{†}	Softball
	Track and field^{†}
	Volleyball
Co-ed sports
Rifle
† – Women's track and field includes both indoor and outdoor, men's is outdoor only

=== CBI results ===
The Eagles have appeared in the College Basketball Invitational (CBI) three times. Their combined record is 5–4.

Ohio Valley Conference logo in Morehead State colors

Year	Round	Opponent	Result
2010	First Round; Quarterfinals	Colorado State; Boston University	W 74–60; L 91–89
2014	First Round	Illinois State	L 77–67
2016	First Round; Quarterfinals; Semifinals; Finals–Game 1 Finals–Game 2 Finals–Game 3	Siena; Duquesne; Ohio; Nevada; Nevada; Nevada	W 84–80; W 82–72; W 77–72; W 86–83; L 77–68; L 85–82

=== Notable athletes ===
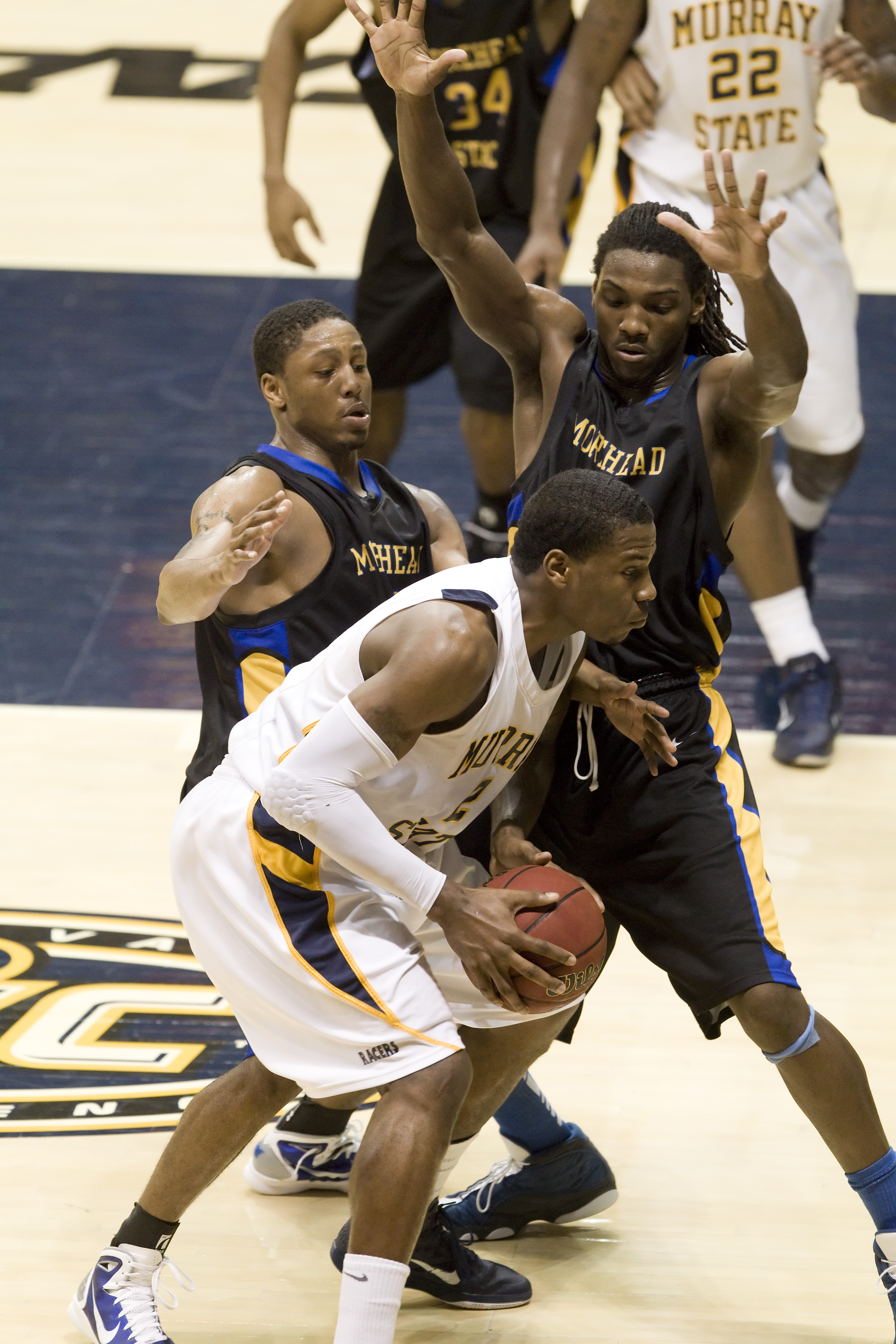
Kenneth Faried, NBA player for the Brooklyn Nets, selected 22nd overall in the 2011 NBA draft

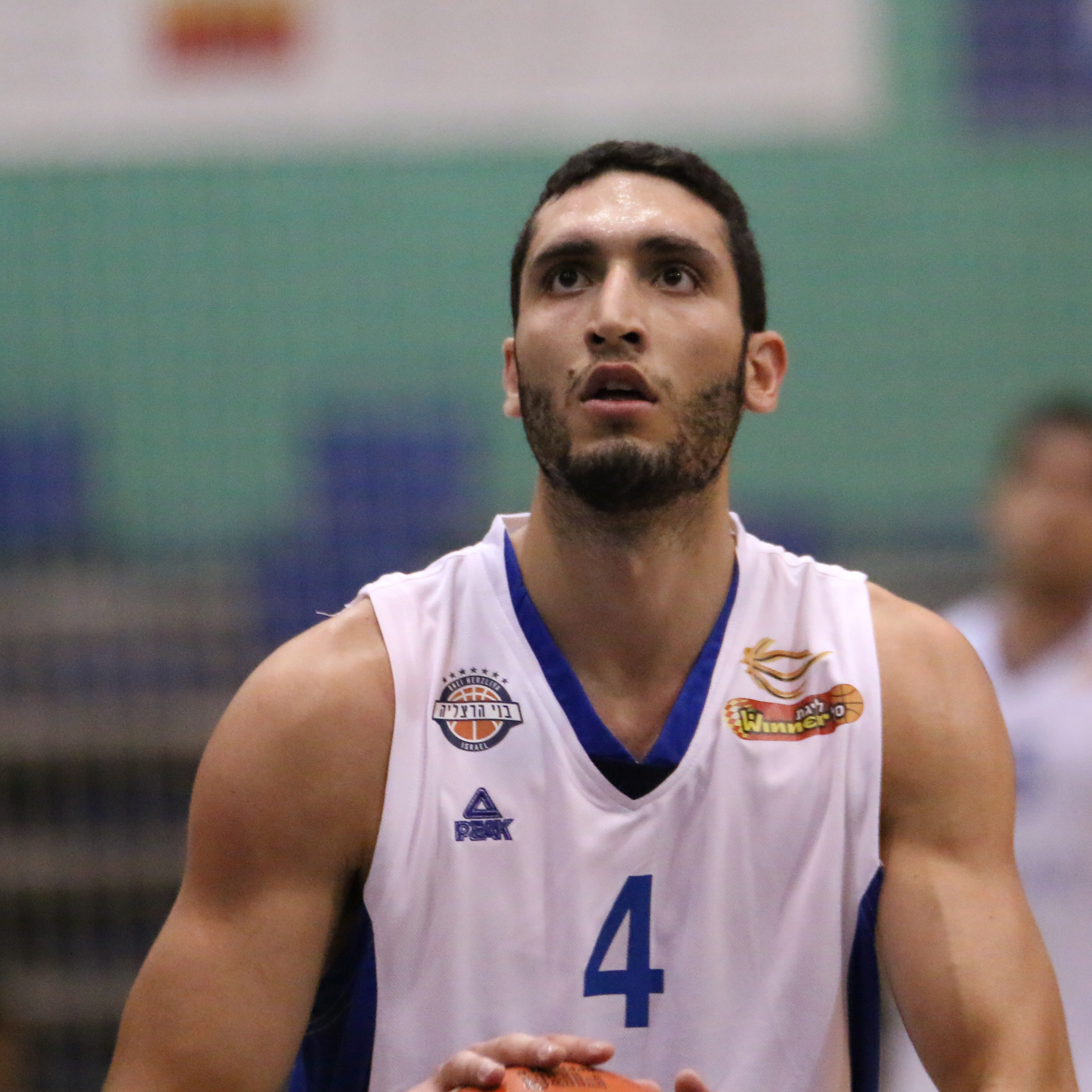
Karam Mashour, Israeli basketball player in the Israeli Basketball Premier League

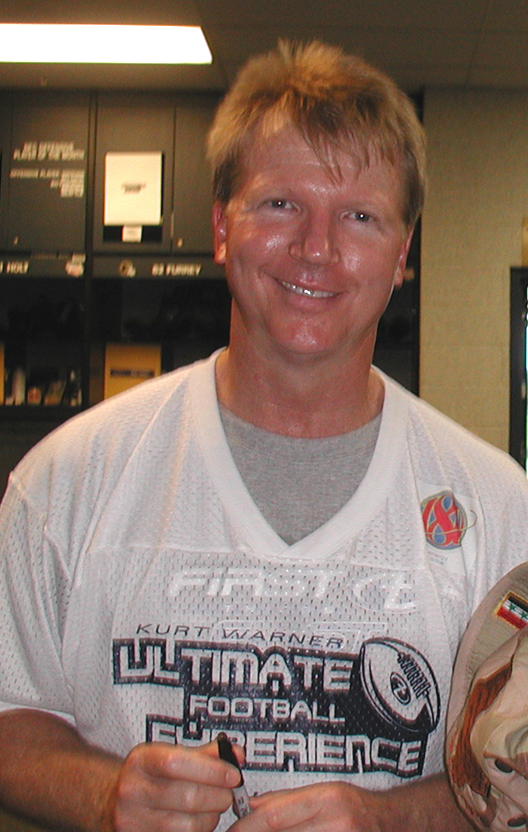
Phil Simms, former quarterback for the New York Giants, MVP of Super Bowl XXI and a 15-year NFL veteran, now a football analyst for the CBS television network and namesake of MSU's football stadium
