= Belmont Bruins =

- University: Belmont University
- Nickname: Bruins
- NCAA: Division I
- Conference: Missouri Valley Conference (primary); Horizon League (men's tennis)
- Athletic director: Scott Corley
- Location: Nashville, Tennessee
- Varsity teams: 17 (8 men's, 9 women's)
- Basketball arena: Curb Event Center
- Baseball stadium: E. S. Rose Park
- Softball stadium: E.S. Rose Park
- Soccer stadium: E.S. Rose Park
- Colors: Navy, white, and red
- Mascot: Bruiser
- Website: belmontbruins.com

The Belmont Bruins are the intercollegiate athletic teams of Belmont University located in Nashville, Tennessee, United States. The Bruins athletic program is a member of the Missouri Valley Conference. Prior to 2022, the Bruins were members of the Ohio Valley Conference (OVC) and competes at the NCAA Division I level.

The program's mascot is Bruiser the Bruin, and the school colors are navy blue and red. The Belmont teams had been known as the Rebels until 1995, when the name was changed due to the historical implications of the name.

== Sports sponsored ==
Men's sports	Women's sports
Baseball	Basketball
Basketball	Cross country
Cross country	Golf
Golf	Soccer
Soccer	Softball
Tennis	Tennis
Track and field^{†}	Track and field^{†}
	Volleyball
† – Track and field includes both indoor and outdoor.

A member of the Missouri Valley Conference, Belmont University sponsors teams in eight men's and nine women's NCAA sanctioned sports. The men's tennis program joined the Horizon League for that sport shortly after Belmont joined the MVC (which sponsors tennis only for women).

=== Basketball ===
The school has a heated basketball rivalry with Lipscomb University, a similarly-sized private institution in Nashville. For much of both schools' athletic histories, Belmont and Lipscomb played one another at least twice per year on a home-and-home basis (even more frequently in some years) in both men's and women's basketball. These games are nicknamed the "Battle of the Boulevard", alluding to the road connecting the two schools. In 2006, with both teams battling for their first-ever NCAA tournament berths, Belmont defeated Lipscomb in overtime to win the Atlantic Sun championship 74–69. The Belmont Bruins were seeded 15th in the 2006 NCAA tournament, losing in the first round to the UCLA Bruins. Even though the two schools are no longer in the same conference following Belmont's 2012 move to the OVC, the games are still played twice a year for both men and women. (The only other non-conference basketball rivalry in Division I with two games each season is New Mexico–New Mexico State.)

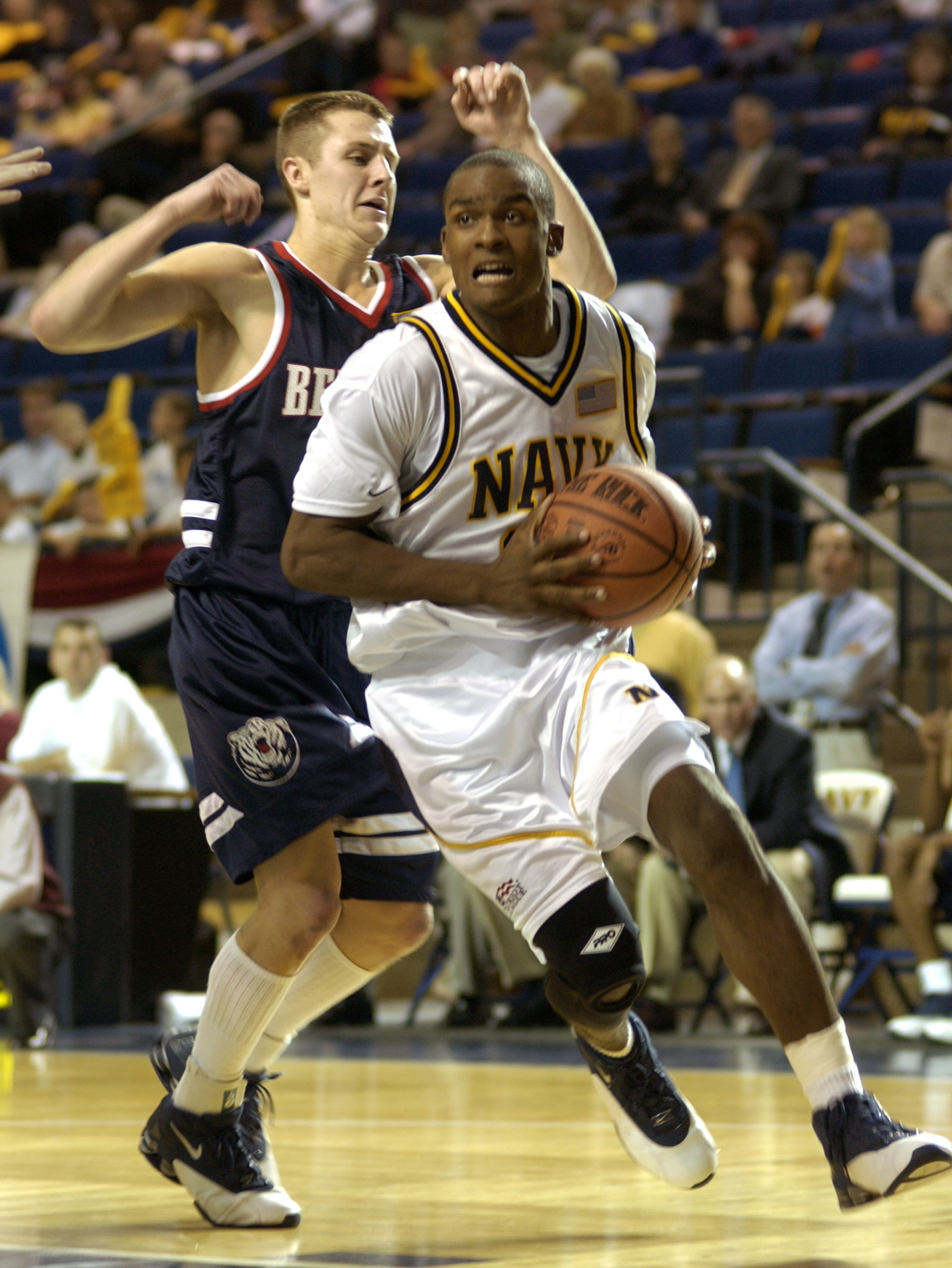
Belmont v Navy game in 2003

In 2007, Belmont won the Atlantic Sun Conference men's basketball tournament for the second year in a row, defeating East Tennessee State University in Johnson City 94–67. The Bruins continued to the NCAA Tournament for the second consecutive year, losing in the first round to the Georgetown Hoyas. In 2008, the Bruins advanced for the third straight year to the NCAA men's basketball tournament, after winning the Atlantic Sun Regular Season as well as Atlantic Sun Tournament Championship, again earning a 15 seed, this time against the #2 seeded Duke Blue Devils. Belmont had their best tournament showing ever in this game, losing by a score of 71–70 to the Blue Devils.

In 2009, the Bruins posted their first postseason men's basketball victory by beating Evansville in the CollegeInsider.com Post Season Tournament (CIT).

In 2011, the Belmont Bruins Men's Basketball program posted a 19–1 record in the Atlantic Sun Conference, won the regular season conference championship, and won the Atlantic Sun Conference tournament Championship by the largest margin (41 points) in conference history. The Bruins entered the NCAA Tournament as a 13th seed, losing to Wisconsin 72–58. The Bruins' 30–5 record for the season set a new, NCAA era record for the program.

In 2012, the team won the Atlantic Sun Regular Season Championship for the fifth time in six years, along with the Atlantic Sun Conference tournament, thus reaching the NCAA Tournament for the fifth time in seven years. Belmont received the fourteenth seed in the Midwest Regional, losing to Georgetown 74-59.

== Athletic facilities ==
The Curb Event Center is home for the volleyball and men's and women's basketball teams' games. The practice facility for these teams is the Crockett Center for Athletic Excellence.

The group of stadiums at Nashville's E. S. Rose Park, located near the campus, is home for Belmont's baseball, softball, men's and women's soccer, and men's and women's outdoor track and field teams.

Nashville's Percy Warner Park hosts Belmont's men's and women's cross country teams.

Belmont's men's golf team practice facility is The Little Course at Conner Lane in Franklin, Tennessee.

The Beaman Family Tennis Complex, which sits atop the Crockett Center is home to the Belmont men's and women's tennis teams.
