= Jacksonville State Gamecocks softball =

Jacksonville State Gamecocks
- University: Jacksonville State University
- Head coach: Julie Boland (1st season)
- Conference: C-USA; D1 Division
- Location: Jacksonville, Alabama, US
- Home stadium: Jana McGinnis Field (capacity: 2,000)
- Nickname: Gamecocks
- Colors: Red and white

NCAA Tournament appearances
- 1996, 2008, 2009, 2010, 2011, 2013, 2016, 2017, 2026

Conference tournament championships
- TAAC: 1996; OVC: 2010, 2011, 2013, 2016, 2017; C-USA: 2026

Regular-season conference championships
- 2026

The Jacksonville State Gamecocks softball team represents Jacksonville State University in NCAA Division I college softball. As of July 1, 2023 the team participates in the Conference USA (C-USA). Prior to the move they were in the ASUN, a league in which it had been a member from 1995 to 2003. Prior to that JSU played in the OVC. The Gamecocks are currently led by head coach Julie Boland. Boland replaced Jana McGinnis in August of 2024, who retired after 31 years leading the Gamecocks. The team plays its home games at Jana McGinnis Field located on the university's campus. The Gamecocks reached the NCAA Super Regionals in 2009. The Gamecocks beat the University of Tennessee to advance.

== Year-by-year results ==
Record table
Season	Coach	Overall	Conference	Standing	Postseason
Jacksonville State (Gulf South Conference (Div.II)) (1988–1994)
1988	Amy Hardeman	6–24	2–6		
1989	Amy Hardeman	11–20	4–6		
1990	Amy Hardeman	25–13	6–2		
1991	Amy Hardeman	23–19	7–1		
1992	Amy Hardeman	22–24	8–8		
1993	Amy Hardeman	16–22	10–8		
1994	Jana McGinnis	16–22			
Jacksonville State (Trans America Athletic Conference) (1995–2001)
1995	Jana McGinnis	33–16	Ineligible	—	
1996	Jana McGinnis	46–11	13–3	1st West	1–2 NCAA Regional
1997	Jana McGinnis	32–17	14–6	1st West	
1998	Jana McGinnis	24–18	9–7	3rd West	
1999	Jana McGinnis	32–26	9–7	2nd West	
2000	Jana McGinnis	33–21	10–4	2nd	
2001	Jana McGinnis	24–25	9–5	t-1st	
Jacksonville State (Atlantic Sun Conference) (2001–2003)
2002	Jana McGinnis	33–21	10–8	t-5th	
2003	Jana McGinnis	40–15	12–10	t-6th	
Jacksonville State (Ohio Valley Conference) (2004–2021)
2004	Jana McGinnis	42–21	16–9	5th	
2005	Jana McGinnis	42–16	22–4	1st	
2006	Jana McGinnis	43–15	21–5	2nd	
2007	Jana McGinnis	35–23	17–10	2nd	
2008	Jana McGinnis	40–16	22–4	1st	2–2 2nd NCAA Regional
2009	Jana McGinnis	43–16	19–2	1st	4–2 2nd NCAA Super Regional –NFCA #21
2010	Jana McGinnis	30–19	13–6	2nd	0–2 NCAA Regional
2011	Jana McGinnis	40–21	21–9	2nd	1–2 NCAA Regional
2012	Jana McGinnis	28–28	19–11	t-3rd	
2013	Jana McGinnis	30–27	11–11	t-2nd East	0–2 NCAA Regional
2014	Jana McGinnis	40–15	22–5	1st East	
2015	Jana McGinnis	38–17	18–6	2nd	
2016	Jana McGinnis	43–17	26–0	1st	2–2 NCAA Regional
2017	Jana McGinnis	41–12	15–1	1st	
2018	Jana McGinnis	35–25	16–6	3rd	
2019	Jana McGinnis	36–15	17–5	T-1st	
2020	Jana McGinnis	15–11			Cancelled due to COVID-19
2021	Jana McGinnis	24–25	21–13	4th	
Total:		858–601	–		
National champion Postseason invitational champion Conference regular season champion Conference regular season and conference tournament champion Division regular season champion Division regular season and conference tournament champion Conference tournament champion

== See also ==
- List of NCAA Division I softball programs
