= Oswego High School (Illinois) =

Public high school in Oswego, Illinois, United States

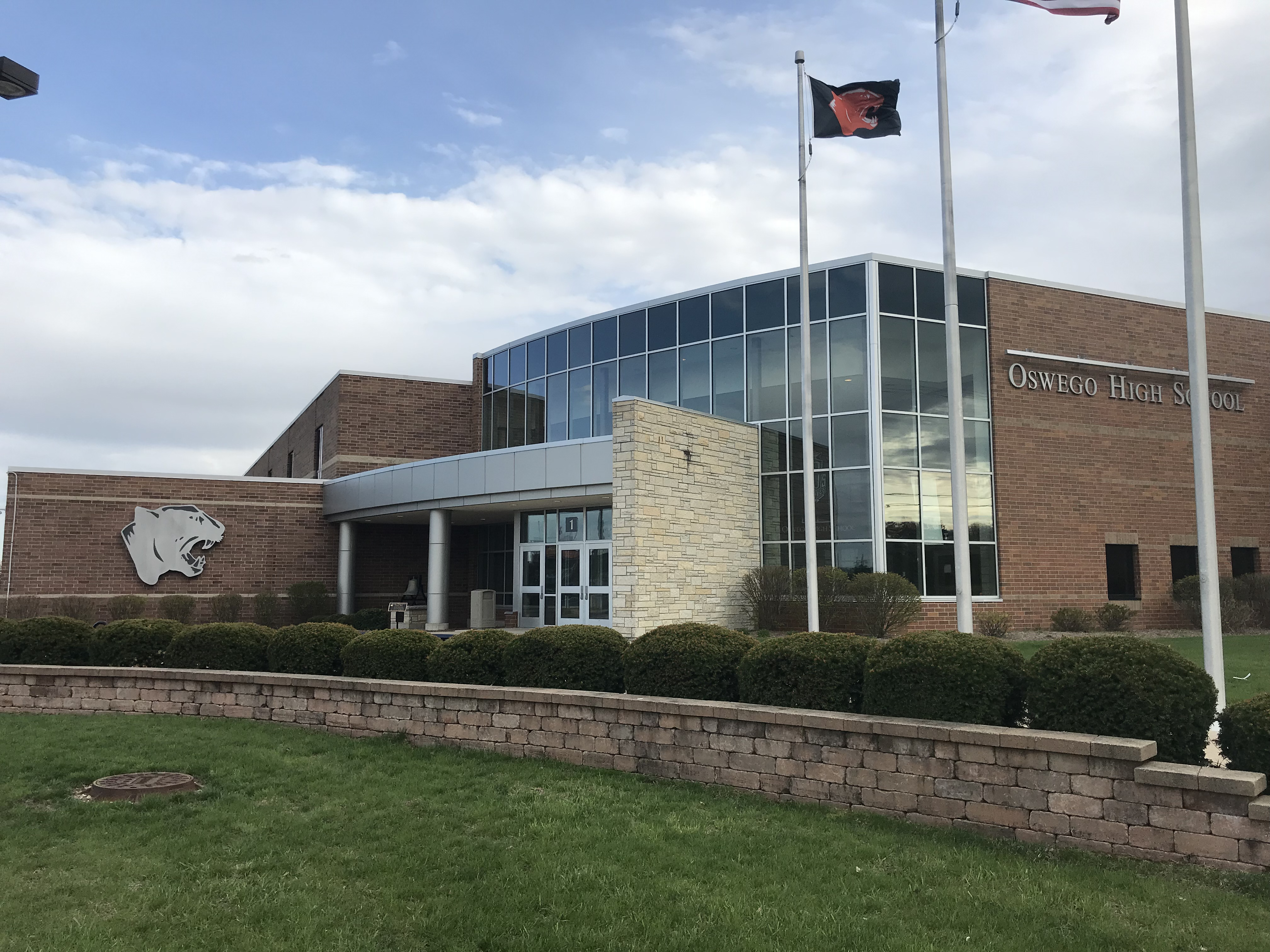

Location
- 4250 Route 71; Oswego, Illinois 60543; United States; 41.683080°N 88.341820°W

Information
- School type: Public secondary
- Opened: 1867
- School district: Oswego CUSD 308
- Superintendent: Dr. Andalib Khelghati
- Principal: Chris Grays
- Teaching staff: 178.20 (FTE)
- Grades: 9–12
- Enrollment: 2,901 (2022–23)
- Average class size: 30.8
- Student to teacher ratio: 16.28
- Campus type: Suburban
- Colors: Navy blue Orange
- Athletics conference: Southwest Prairie Conference
- Team name: Panthers
- Rival: Oswego East High School
- Newspaper: 42Fifty
- Yearbook: Reflector
- Website: OHS website

Oswego High School, or OHS, is a public four-year high school located in Oswego, Illinois, a southwest suburb of Chicago, Illinois, in the United States. It is part of Oswego Community Unit School District 308, which also includes Oswego East High School.

== History ==
In 1852, The Old Stone School opened as Oswego's first permanent school building, at the corner of Tyler and Monroe Streets. The Old Stone School served all grade levels, ultimately operating as Oswego's first dedicated elementary, middle, and high school. In 1885, The Old Stone School was gutted by fire, and classes were moved to the former Kendall County Courthouse (Which operated as the county courthouse from 1848 to 1864), where some high school classes had been taking place since 1867. Between 1885 and 1886, the former courthouse was demolished to make way for a new school building. In the fall of 1886, a new building opened as The Red Brick School, which also served all grades.

The Red Brick School operated as the sole official school building in Oswego for the next 60 years until the arrival of Caterpillar and Western Electric, who built factories north of Downtown Oswego, near Montgomery, Illinois. The opening of both factories resulted in a population boom within the village. By 1947, The Red Brick School could no longer hold full class sizes for all grades, and the village moved to build a new school for high school courses. At the beginning of the 1951–52 school year, high school classes began at the new Oswego High School on Franklin Street. The Red Brick school served elementary and middle school classes for the next 20 years, before it was shuttered and razed to build a new post office.

The Oswego High School building at 61 Franklin Street operated for only 13 years before the town outgrew the building again. In the early 60s, the village bought farmland along the eastern side of Route 71 (Illinois), and began constructing a new high school. At the same time, the village began constructing East View Elementary School, which was to be located across Illinois Route 71 from the planned high school. In 1964, classes started at the new Oswego High School, along with classes at East View. Middle school courses moved into the former Oswego High School on Franklin Street, where the building was renamed Oswego Junior High, later known as Traughber Junior High (named after SD308 superintendent T. Loyd Traughber). The building at 4250 Route 71 is the current Oswego High School.

At the beginning of the 2004–05 school year, half of Oswego High School's student population was split and sent to attend the new Oswego East High School.

== Expansion and Renovation ==
As Oswego continued and continues to grow many additions have been made to the existing 1964 structure.

In 1989, construction started on an auditorium, which was then completed in late 1990. In the 2000s, the auditorium was dedicated to Dave and Donna Barnes, longtime Oswego drama teachers.

In 1990, construction started/completed on a new semi-circle-shaped cafeteria and atrium connected to the new auditorium.

Also in 1990, the existing library was moved from the 2nd floor to the first floor and was connected to both the new cafeteria and auditorium by the new atrium.

In 1992, a field house including an indoor track was built and completed.

In 1998, more Science and English classes were constructed on the north facade of the building.

In 2002, more classrooms were built along with a new front entrance.

The most recent addition to Oswego High School was in 2013, in which a new wing was built on the northeastern face of the building. The new wing including 22 new mixed use classrooms, an extension to the music wing, department offices, locker rooms, and student lockers. Also in 2013, renovations began throughout the building including a "face-lift" on the interior of the bare-bones construction of the field house, a redesign and expansion of the existing music wing, (including a new band room, choir room, sound-proof practice rooms, locker room, dressing rooms, and a "MIDI Lab" furnished with keyboard pianos and composing software), a new stage floor, gymnasium floor and redesign.

== Academics ==
In 2019, Oswego had an average SAT score of 515.4 for math and 515.3 for ELA, and graduated 96.4% of its senior class. In the same year, it received the "Commendable" designation from the Illinois State Board of Education, meaning the school had no underperforming student groups, maintained a graduation rate higher than 67% and had a performance that was not in the top 10% of schools statewide.

== Activities ==
In 2005, the combined marching bands of Oswego High and Oswego East marched the 116th Tournament of Roses parade, the only band from Illinois to march at the event. OHS offers many co-curricular activities and clubs including six student band classes, several choirs, a drama club, and service organizations. Also available for students to join are organizations that compete in IHSA competitions such as a scholastic bowl team, a speech team, mathletes, WYSE Scholastic Team, and Horticulture/FFA. Oswego High School also boasts an active Student Council, a member of the IASC, and National Honors Society.

== Athletics ==
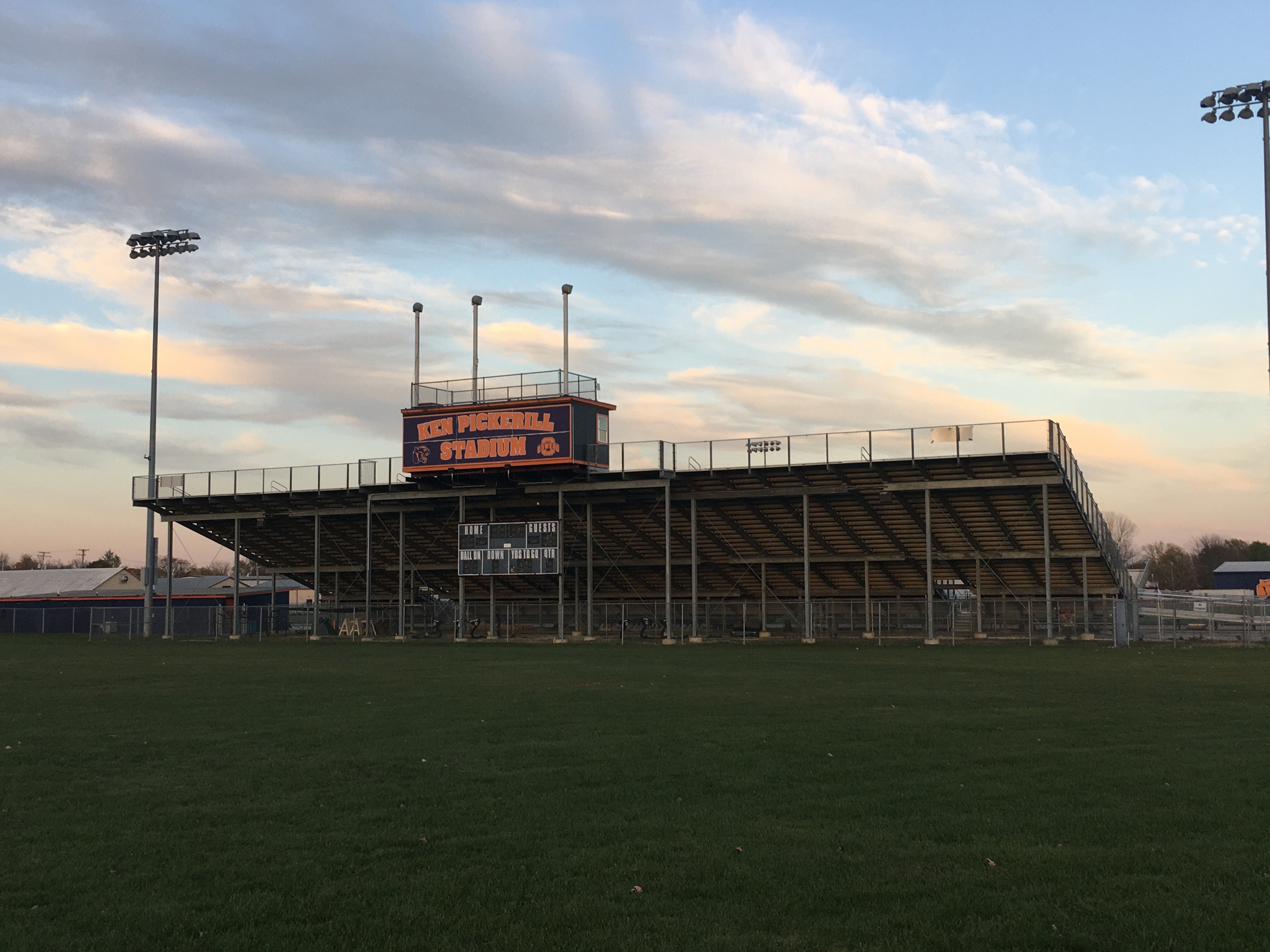
Main stand of Ken Pickerill Stadium, the football stadium of OHS

Oswego competes in the Southwest Prairie Conference, and is a member of the Illinois High School Association (IHSA), the organization which governs most interscholastic sports and competitive activities in Illinois. Teams are stylized as the Panthers. The Oswego High School football stadium is named "Ken Pickerill Stadium", named after the longtime teacher and coach of many OHS sports teams.

The school sponsors interscholastic teams for young men and women in basketball, cross country, soccer, swimming & diving, tennis, track & field, and volleyball. Young men may compete in baseball, High school football, golf, and wrestling, while young women may compete in badminton, bowling, cheerleading, gymnastics, and softball.

OHS has a rivalry with Oswego East High School. The matchup between the two schools is known as the "Crosstown Classic."

=== Championships ===
The following teams have won their respective IHSA sponsored state championship tournaments or meets:

- Bowling (girls): 1997–98
- Football: 1992–93, 2003–04

== Notable alumni ==
- Rob Baxley, American football tackle for the Phoenix Cardinals and Amsterdam Admirals
- Rita B. Garman, justice of the Illinois Supreme Court for the fourth district
- Joey Goodspeed, former NFL running back for the San Diego Chargers, St. Louis Rams, and Minnesota Vikings
- Dennis Hastert, former representative of Illinois' 14th congressional district and former Speaker of the House of Representatives
- Michael Joseph, UFL cornerback playing with the DC Defenders, former NFL defensive back for the Chicago Bears
- Alex Magee, former NFL defensive end for the Kansas City Chiefs and Tampa Bay Buccaneers
- Noah Shannon, NFL defensive tackle for the Las Vegas Raiders
- Julianne Sitch, former professional soccer defender
- Sean Totsch, professional soccer defender for Louisville City FC
- Keith R. Wheeler, former member of the Illinois General Assembly
