= Matt Hanson =

Matt Hanson may refer to:

- Matt Hanson (author), author, film producer, and film director
- Matt Hanson (politician), American politician from Illinois

== See also ==
- Matt Hansen, American politician from Nebraska
