= Oswego Township, Kendall County, Illinois =

Oswego Township
- Township
- Location in Kendall County

- Kendall County's location in Illinois
- Coordinates: 41°40′53″N 088°19′21″W
- Country: United States
- State: Illinois
- County: Kendall
- Established: November 6, 1849

Area
  - Total: 40.55 sq mi (105.0 km^{2})
  - Land: 39.91 sq mi (103.4 km^{2})
  - Water: 0.64 sq mi (1.7 km^{2}) 1.58%
- Elevation: 663 ft (202 m)

Population (2020)
  - Total: 55,771
  - Density: 1,397/sq mi (539.5/km^{2})
- FIPS code: 17-093-56900
- GNIS feature ID: 0429511
- Website: www.oswegotownship.org

Oswego Township occupies the 6-mile-square-plus additional land to the south of the Fox River in northeast corner of Kendall County, Illinois. As of the 2020 census, its population was 55,771 and it contained 19,325 housing units.

== Geography ==
According to the 2021 census gazetteer files, Oswego Township has a total area of 40.55 square miles (105.02 km^{2}), of which 39.91 square miles (103.37 km^{2}) (or 98.42%) is land and 0.64 square miles (1.66 km^{2}) (or 1.58%) is water.

U.S. Route 30 and U.S. Route 34 run east to west through the township, as well as IL 25, IL 31 and IL 71. Today, the township has become predominantly a suburb of Chicago.

=== Cities and towns ===
- Aurora (partial)
- Montgomery (partial)
- Oswego (majority)
- Plainfield (partial)

=== Other Communities ===
- Boulder Hill
- Wolfs at 41.695862°N 88.260902°W

== Demographics ==
As of the 2020 census there were 55,771 people, 18,925 households, and 14,770 families residing in the township. The population density was 1,375.33 inhabitants per square mile (531.02/km^{2}). There were 19,325 housing units at an average density of 476.56 per square mile (184.00/km^{2}). The racial makeup of the township was 67.56% White, 7.47% African American, 0.51% Native American, 5.32% Asian, 0.02% Pacific Islander, 7.44% from other races, and 11.67% from two or more races. Hispanic or Latino of any race were 19.40% of the population.

There were 18,925 households, out of which 42.40% had children under the age of 18 living with them, 63.09% were married couples living together, 10.06% had a female householder with no spouse present, and 21.96% were non-families. 19.40% of all households were made up of individuals, and 8.40% had someone living alone who was 65 years of age or older. The average household size was 3.01 and the average family size was 3.48.

The township's age distribution consisted of 27.7% under the age of 18, 8.0% from 18 to 24, 27.6% from 25 to 44, 25% from 45 to 64, and 11.6% who were 65 years of age or older. The median age was 37.2 years. For every 100 females, there were 90.5 males. For every 100 females age 18 and over, there were 90.6 males.

The median income for a household in the township was $89,363, and the median income for a family was $104,330. Males had a median income of $56,587 versus $37,177 for females. The per capita income for the township was $36,419. About 0.9% of families and 3.0% of the population were below the poverty line, including 1.9% of those under age 18 and 4.9% of those age 65 or over.

Historical population
Census	Pop.	Note	%±
2000	28,417		—
2010	50,870		79.0%
2020	55,771		9.6%
U.S. Decennial Census

== Government ==
The township is governed by an elected Town Board of a Supervisor and four Trustees. It also has an elected Assessor, Clerk, Highway Commissioner and Supervisor. The Township Office is located at 84 Templeton Drive, Suite 104 Oswego, IL 60543
