= Gray–Watkins Mill =

- U.S. National Register of Historic Places
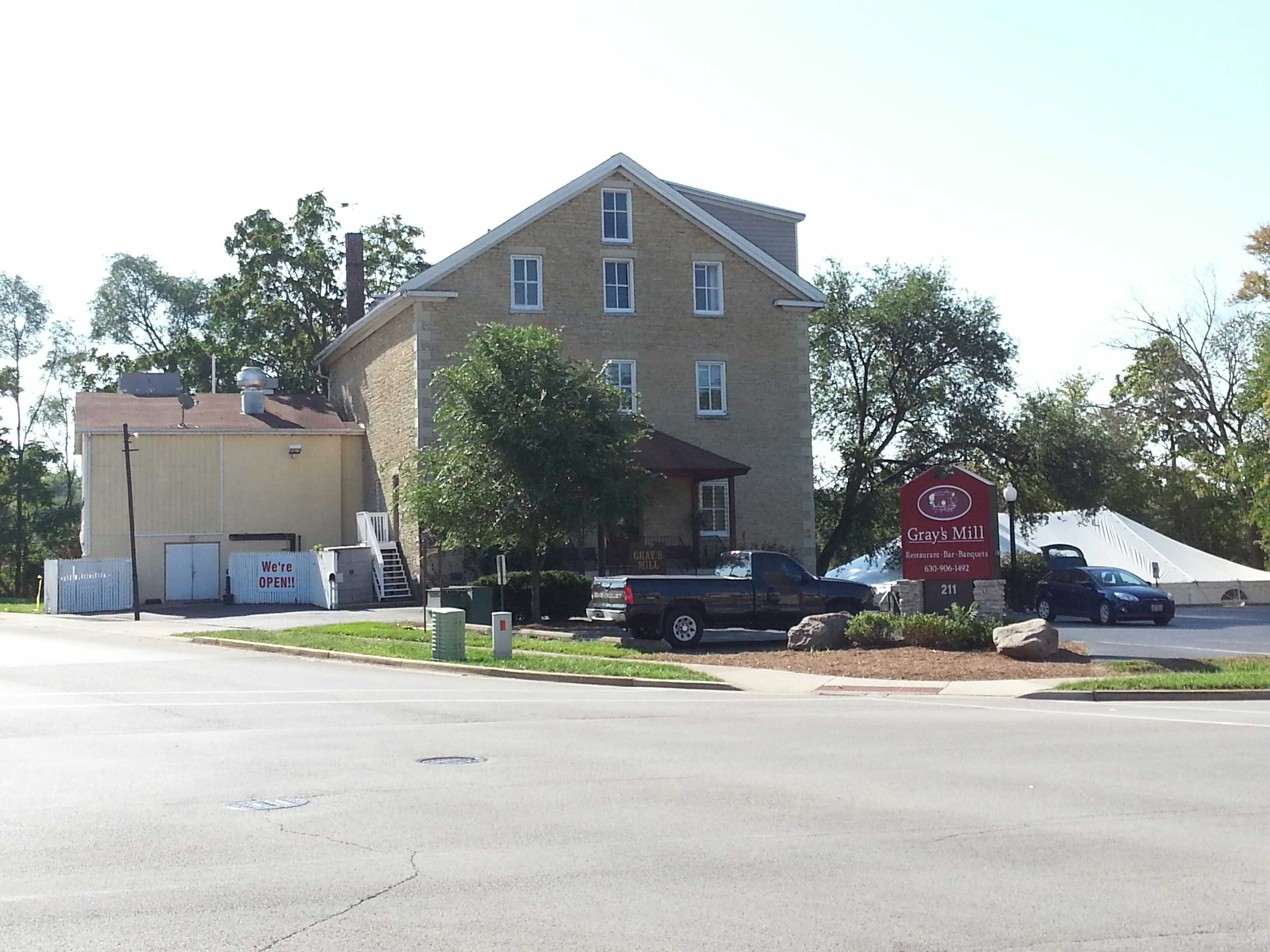

- Location within Illinois Location within the United States
- Location: 211 N. River St., Montgomery, Illinois, U.S.
- Coordinates: 41°43′42″N 88°26′11″W
- Built: 1853
- Architect: John Helm
- NRHP reference No.: 79000846
- Added to NRHP: December 17, 1979

The Gray–Watkins Mill or Gray's Mill is a historic structure in Montgomery, in the U.S. state of Illinois. The building was an early turbine mill on the Fox River, and was later used by an automobile parts manufacturer. It was listed on the National Register of Historic Places in 1979.

== History ==
The Gray–Watkins Mill is located on the southeast corner of River and Mill Streets in Montgomery. Built in 1853, its original purpose was as a water-powered turbine flour mill on the Fox River. It operated until 1916, when ice in the river destroyed the dam. Electricity allowed the mill a replacement power source until it shut down in 1922. For the next several decades, the mill stood empty. In 1945, Ernest Anfinsen purchased the building to manufacture automotive parts. The building was again abandoned following Anfinsen's death in 1971. It was acknowledged as a historic site by Montgomery and nearby Aurora and was renovated in 1976. The building was listed on the National Register of Historic Places on December 17, 1979.

== Architecture ==
The mill is rectangular in shape, with an asphalt shingle gable roof. It stands four stories stall (plus a loft) and is supported with 15 columns per floor. The main entrance is on the west side, which also features a concrete dock. An oak board porch with a wood shake roof was later constructed on top of this dock. Additional doors are found on the north side (added in the 1950s) and the east side (where the mill race used to be, now covered in concrete). There is a total of 43 windows, most of them 6 by 4 feet (1.8 m × 1.2 m). A storage until beneath a dormer houses supplies and machinery for the elevator, which is no longer in use.

Inside, the main staircase is on the west side of the building, altered to comply with modern building codes. A wrought iron bannister was also added from a demolishing project from Chicago. The interior walls were originally stone, but were covered with cement and plaster some time during its manufacturing years. During the 1976 restoration, insulation, drywall, and furring was added. The main level features a cherrywood floor. New light fixtures were added in the 1976 renovation.
