= Oswego East High School =

Public high school in Oswego, Illinois, United States

Location
- 1525 Harvey Road; Oswego, Illinois; United States; 41°42′2″N 88°16′52″W

Information
- School type: Public secondary
- Established: 2004
- School district: Oswego Community Unit School District 308
- Superintendent: Dr. Andalib Khelghati
- Principal: Brett McPherson
- Faculty: 203
- Teaching staff: 159.50 (FTE)
- Grades: 9–12
- Gender: Co-ed
- Enrollment: 2,805 (2023–24)
- Average class size: 25.35
- Student to teacher ratio: 17.59
- Area: approx. 600,000 ft²
- Campus type: Suburban
- Colors: Navy blue Silver
- Fight song: Oswego East Fight Song
- Athletics conference: Southwest Prairie Conference
- Mascot: Wolf
- Nickname: Wolves
- Rival: Oswego High School
- Newspaper: The Edge
- Website: OEHS website

Oswego East High School, or OEHS, is a public four-year high school located in Oswego, Illinois, a southwest suburb of Chicago, Illinois, in the United States. It is part of Oswego Community Unit School District 308, which also includes Oswego High School.

== History ==
The high school was established in 2004 due to the growing population in Oswego, Illinois. A three-story central commons serves as the school's social nexus and as a community event room. Adjoining the commons are a theater and performing-arts wing, a sports complex that houses three gyms, a 220-meter track, a competition pool, dance room, exercise rooms, a community meeting room with adjacent commercial kitchen, and two three-story classroom wings. From 2012 to 2013, Oswego East underwent expansions and renovations to prepare for an additional growth in student population. The additions were completed in August 2013, increasing the previous capacity of 2,400 students to 3,200 students. The original design and following additions and renovations were all completed by Kluber Architects + Engineers, earning a Crow Island School Citation from American School and University Magazine in 2005.

== Athletics ==
Oswego East High School is a part of the Southwest Prairie Conference and the Illinois High School Association. OEHS has a rivalry with Oswego High School. The matchup between the two schools is known as the "Crosstown football game". Notable athletes include Noah Schultz, professional baseball player for the Chicago White Sox.

=== Boys' teams ===
The school has boys' teams for a range of sports, including Baseball, Basketball, Bowling, Football, Cross Country, Golf, Soccer, Swimming, Tennis, Track, Volleyball, and Wrestling.

=== Girls' teams ===
There is also a range of girls' sports teams including Badminton, Basketball, Bowling, Cheerleading, Cross Country, Gymnastics, Soccer, Softball, Swimming, Tennis, Track, and Volleyball.

== Extracurricular activities ==
Extracurricular activities include Academic Decathlon, Auto Club, Drama/Theater, Interact Club, Mathletes, Pom Squad, Robotics team, Scholastic Bowl, Chess Team, Speech Team, Wolfpack News, and Wolfpack Sports Fanclub. There are also a number of honors societies, such as National Honors Society, National Science Honors Society, and National English Honors society

== Notable alumni ==
- RayJ Dennis (2019), professional basketball player
- Noah Schultz (2022), professional baseball player
- Alex Wollschlaeger (Class of 2020) is an American football offensive tackle. He played 44 games (starting 39) at Bowling Green State University, earning first-team All–Mid-American Conference honors following the 2024 season. He later transferred to the University of Kentucky, where he started all 12 games in his lone season in the Southeastern Conference. He signed with the New Orleans Saints as an undrafted free agent following the 2026 NFL Draft, becoming the first Oswego East High School alumnus to join the National Football League (NFL).
