= Matt Hanson (politician) =

American politician and engineer

Member of the Illinois House of Representatives from the 83rd district
- Incumbent
- Assumed office January 11, 2023
- Preceded by: Keith Wheeler

Personal details
- Party: Democratic
- Education: University of Richmond
- Occupation: Railroad engineer; politician
- Website: https://repmatthanson.com/

Matt Hanson is an American railroad engineer and politician who has served as an Illinois State Representative for the 83rd District since 2023. A Democrat, Hanson defeated Republican Keith Wheeler in 2022. His district covers parts of St. Charles, Geneva, Batavia, North Aurora, Aurora, Montgomery, and Oswego.

== Early life and education ==
Hanson earned a B.S. in business administration from the University of Richmond.

== Illinois House of Representatives ==
In 2022, Hanson sought the Democratic nomination for state representative from the 83rd District which he won. He went on to defeat incumbent Republican Keith Wheeler with 53.7 percent of the vote. Hanson ran on a platform of protecting worker's rights, standing up for Illinois families, protecting a woman's right to choose and fighting gun violence. He was sworn in for his first term on January 11, 2023.

In the 103rd General Assembly, Hanson served on the Appropriations-General Service Committee; Cities & Villages Committee; Police & Fire Committee; and the Transportation: Regulations, Roads & Bridges Committee.

Hanson won the 2024 Democratic primary, after facing a challenger.

== Personal life ==
He is an engineer for the BNSF Railway as well as an officer in the Smart-TD union.

He was previously elected to the Kane County Board from District 6 in 2018, but lost re-election to the seat in 2020 in the primary. He is also a former member of the Kane County Forest Preserve Commission. He currently serves on the Aurora Historic Preservation Commission and the Metra Citizens' Advisory Board in addition to his service in the House of Representatives.

In 2023, Hanson was arrested for driving under the influence of alcohol, after being found asleep in his vehicle in the parking lot of his apartment complex. His blood alcohol content was measured at 0.186%, On December 19, 2023, Hanson pleaded guilty, and was sentenced to 12 months of court supervision, 100 hours of community service, an evaluation, counseling, treatment, and a $3,555 fine.

== Electoral history ==
Illinois 83rd Representative District General Election, 2022
| Party | Candidate | Votes | % |
|---|---|---|---|
| Democratic | Matt Hanson | 20,732 | 53.73 |
| Republican | Keith R. Wheeler | 17,855 | 46.27 |
| Total votes | | 38,587 | 100.0 |

Illinois 83rd Representative District Democratic Primary, 2022
| Party | Candidate | Votes | % |
|---|---|---|---|
| Democratic | Matt Hanson | 4,412 | 67.19 |
| Democratic | Arad Boxenbaum | 2,154 | 32.81 |
| Total votes | | 38,161 | 100.0 |

Kane County Board District 6 Democratic Primary, 2020
| Party | Candidate | Votes | % |
|---|---|---|---|
| Democratic | Ron Ford | 911 | 44.48 |
| Democratic | Matt Hanson (Incumbent) | 904 | 44.14 |
| Total votes | | 2,048 | 100.0 |

Kane County Board District 6 General Election, 2018
| Party | Candidate | Votes | % |
|---|---|---|---|
| Democratic | Matt Hanson | 3,782 | 77.28 |
| Democratic | Ronald Ford (Write-in) | 309 | 6.31 |
| Total votes | | 4,205 | 100.0 |
