= Michael Joseph (American football) =

American football player (born 1995)

No. 31, 15
- Position: Cornerback

Personal information
- Born: March 19, 1995 (age 31); Oswego, Illinois, U.S.
- Listed height: 6 ft 1 in (1.85 m)
- Listed weight: 187 lb (85 kg)

Career information
- High school: Oswego
- College: Dubuque (2014–2018)
- NFL draft: 2018: undrafted

Career history
- Chicago Bears (2018–2022); DC Defenders (2023–2024)

Awards and highlights
- All-XFL Team (2023)
- Stats at Pro Football Reference

Michael Joseph (born March 19, 1995) is an American former professional football player who was a cornerback in the National Football League (NFL). He played college football for the Dubuque Spartans before playing professionally for the Chicago Bears of the NFL. He signed with the Bears as an undrafted free agent in 2018.

== Early life ==
Joseph grew up in Oswego, Illinois, a suburb of Chicago. Joseph barely played at Oswego High School in his hometown, never making a start and barely recording any stats in four years.

== College career ==
Some small schools were interested, and Joseph committed to play college football at Dubuque, a Division III school located about five miles away from the Iowa-Illinois border and only has about 2,200 students. Joseph had family ties to the Spartans as his cousin Bridget Hosley ran track there. He was only about 5'11' and 150 pounds as a freshman, so the Spartans put Joseph on the program's developmental squad before being called up to the roster later in the year. Starting as a sophomore in 2015, Joseph would make three straight All-Iowa Conference teams. In 2017, Joseph won the Cliff Harris Award as the best small-college defender. He was the only D-III player at the 2018 Senior Bowl in Mobile, Alabama.

== Professional career ==
Pre-draft measurables
Height	Weight	Arm length	Hand span	40-yard dash	10-yard split	20-yard split	20-yard shuttle	Three-cone drill	Vertical jump	Broad jump	Bench press
6 ft 0 5/8 in (1.84 m)	187 lb (85 kg)	30 1/4 in (0.77 m)	8 5/8 in (0.22 m)	4.53 s	1.54 s	2.63 s	4.20 s	6.89 s	34.0 in (0.86 m)	9 ft 11 in (3.02 m)	17 reps
All values from NFL Combine/Pro Day

=== Chicago Bears ===
Joseph went undrafted in the 2018 NFL draft and signed with his hometown Chicago Bears on May 11, 2018. He was released during final roster cuts be re-signed to the practice squad on September 3, 2018.

Joseph was released again on September 1, 2019, but re-signed to the practice squad.

On August 3, 2020, Joseph was placed on injured reserve. He was activated on November 9, 2020.

On April 9, 2021, Joseph was re-signed by the Bears. He was released on August 26, 2021. On December 20, 2021, he appeared in his first NFL game against the Minnesota Vikings, playing three snaps on defense and six on special teams. Joseph was reverted to the practice squad after that game.

On August 16, 2022, Joseph was waived by the Bears and reverted to injured reserve. He was released on October 1, 2022.

=== DC Defenders ===
On January 13, 2023, Joseph signed with the DC Defenders of the XFL. He started all nine games for the Defenders in 2023, grabbing four interceptions to go along with forty total tackles. Joseph was named to the 2023 All-XFL Team along with DC teammates Jordan Ta'amu, Abram Smith, Liam Fornadel, Davin Bellamy, Lucky Jackson and Daniel Whelan.
