= TJHS =

TJHS may refer to:

- Texas Jewish Historical Society
- Thomas Jefferson High School (disambiguation)
- Thompson Junior High School, Oswego, Illinois, United States
