= Boulder Hill, Illinois =

Boulder Hill
- Census-Designated Place
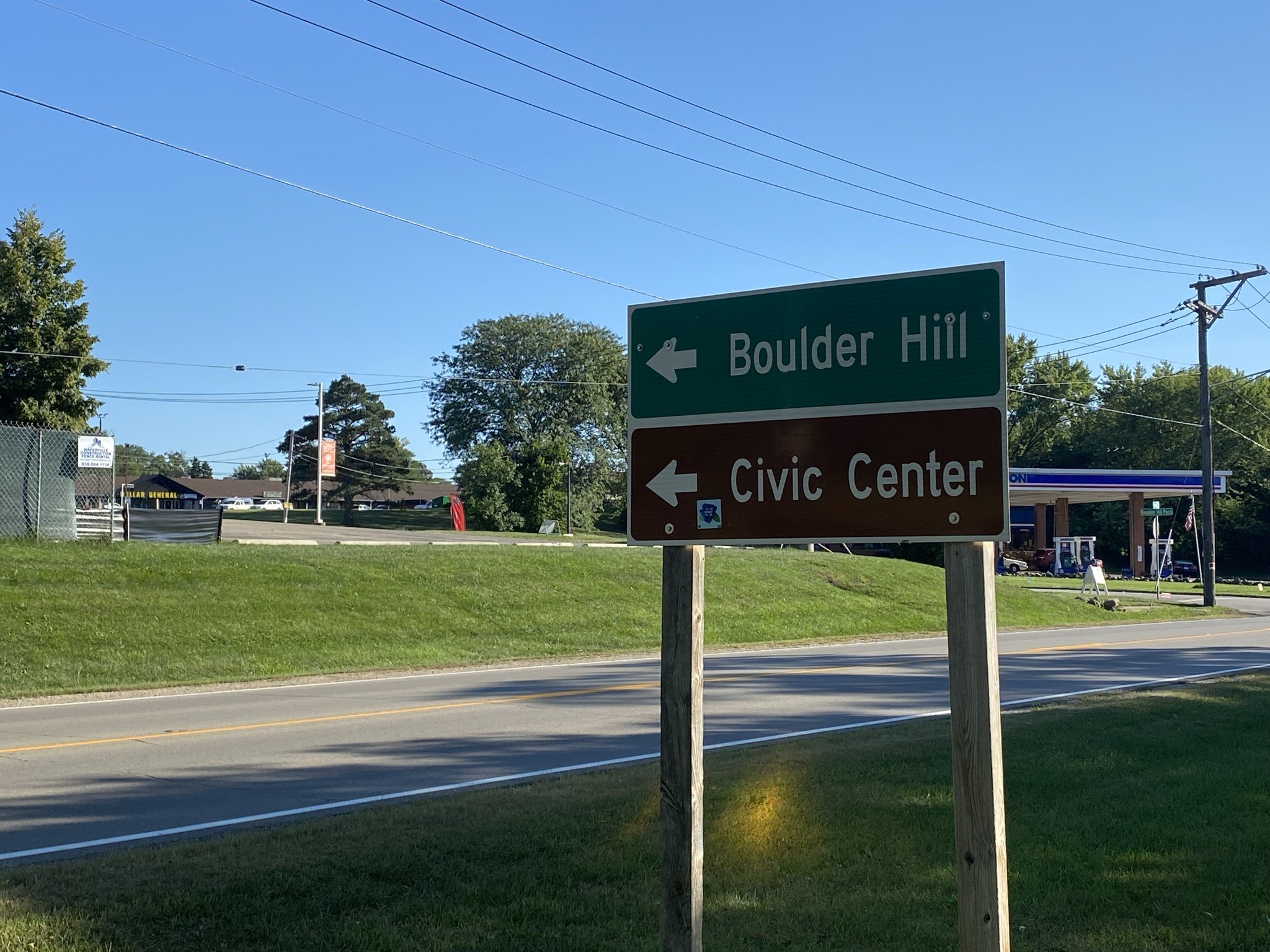
- Sign along Illinois Route 25
- Nicknames: The Hill, Boulder Hood
- Location of Boulder Hill (CDP) within Illinois Boulder Hill (the United States)
- Coordinates: 41°42′41″N 88°20′07″W
- Country: United States
- State: Illinois
- County: Kendall
- Township: Oswego

Area
  - Total: 1.46 sq mi (3.79 km^{2})
  - Land: 1.46 sq mi (3.78 km^{2})
  - Water: 0.0077 sq mi (0.02 km^{2})
- Elevation: 663 ft (202 m)

Population (2020)
  - Total: 8,394
  - Density: 5,756.2/sq mi (2,222.47/km^{2})
- Time zone: UTC-6 (CST)
  - Summer (DST): UTC-5 (CDT)
- ZIP code: 60538
- Area codes: 630, 331
- FIPS code: 17-07419
- GNIS feature ID: 2393344

Boulder Hill is a census-designated place (CDP) in Oswego Township, Kendall County, Illinois, United States. According to the 2020 census, the population was 8,394. It is part of the Chicago metropolitan area on the Fox River, south of Aurora.

== Geography ==
Boulder Hill is located at 41°42′41″N 88°20′07″W (41.7113530, -88.3351400).

According to the 2021 census gazetteer files, Boulder Hill has a total area of 1.47 square miles (3.81 km^{2}), of which 1.46 square miles (3.78 km^{2}) (or 99.52%) is land and 0.01 square miles (0.03 km^{2}) (or 0.48%) is water.

Up until the early 2000s, the Boulder Hill subdivision had a small development area, equating to almost a town square. The community itself has a strong identity, as the people from Boulder Hill are not classified as being from Montgomery or Oswego, two nearby larger towns.

Postal service is provided to Boulder Hill via the Montgomery Post Office. While Boulder Hill is unincorporated and not part of the village of Montgomery, there is confusion due to Boulder Hill residents' mailing addresses including "Montgomery" as the designated address. Governmental services provided to Boulder Hill primarily come from either Kendall County or Oswego Township offices.

The community has four churches, a grocery store, a small retail development, a gas station, three schools (two elementary and a middle school), a retirement facility, and the area used to have an automotive dealership. There is minimal vacant land left for development. The villages of Oswego and Montgomery have both expanded their communities up to the boundaries of Boulder Hill, so there is no room for further business expansion. Other than the Boulder Hill Market, most of the commercial businesses located in Boulder Hill are part of the village of Oswego.

Being unincorporated, Boulder Hill's property taxes have risen in recent years as the various taxing bodies such as the Oswegoland Park District and the Oswego School District have expanded to keep up with the growth of adjacent communities such as Oswego. So while Boulder Hill was previously known for having low property taxes because it does not have its own government, that is no longer the case.

== Demographics ==
Historical population
Census	Pop.	Note	%±
2000	8,169		—
2010	8,108		−0.7%
2020	8,394		3.5%
U.S. Decennial Census; 2010 2020

=== Racial and ethnic composition ===
Boulder Hill CDP, Illinois – Racial and ethnic composition Note: the US Census treats Hispanic/Latino as an ethnic category. This table excludes Latinos from the racial categories and assigns them to a separate category. Hispanics/Latinos may be of any race.
Race / Ethnicity (NH = Non-Hispanic)	Pop 2000	Pop 2010	Pop 2020	% 2000	% 2010	% 2020
White alone (NH)	7,048	5,755	4,393	86.28%	70.98%	52.34%
Black or African American alone (NH)	149	351	338	1.82%	4.33%	4.03%
Native American or Alaska Native alone (NH)	20	10	5	0.24%	0.12%	0.06%
Asian alone (NH)	54	52	78	0.66%	0.64%	0.93%
Pacific Islander alone (NH)	1	2	0	0.01%	0.02%	0.00%
Other race alone (NH)	1	3	23	0.01%	0.04%	0.27%
Mixed race or Multiracial (NH)	94	130	306	1.15%	1.60%	3.65%
Hispanic or Latino (any race)	802	1,805	3,251	9.82%	22.26%	38.73%
Total	8,169	8,108	8,394	100.00%	100.00%	100.00%

=== 2020 census ===
As of the 2020 census, Boulder Hill had a population of 8,394 and 2,881 households. The population density was 5,729.69 inhabitants per square mile (2,212.25/km^{2}). There were 2,962 housing units at an average density of 2,021.84 per square mile (780.64/km^{2}).

The median age was 36.0 years. 26.3% of residents were under the age of 18 and 14.6% of residents were 65 years of age or older. For every 100 females there were 96.1 males, and for every 100 females age 18 and over there were 93.3 males age 18 and over.

100.0% of residents lived in urban areas, while 0.0% lived in rural areas.

Of all households, 37.8% had children under the age of 18 living in them. 52.4% were married-couple households, 14.7% were households with a male householder and no spouse or partner present, and 24.8% were households with a female householder and no spouse or partner present. About 21.0% of all households were made up of individuals, and 10.7% had someone living alone who was 65 years of age or older.

Of the 2,962 housing units, 2.7% were vacant. The homeowner vacancy rate was 1.4% and the rental vacancy rate was 2.6%.

=== Income and poverty ===
The median income for a household in the CDP was $69,227, and the median income for a family was $69,980. Males had a median income of $38,091 versus $28,705 for females. The per capita income for the CDP was $25,669. About 2.6% of families and 5.0% of the population were below the poverty line, including 6.4% of those under age 18 and 2.0% of those age 65 or over.

== Education ==
It is in the Oswego Community Unit School District 308.

== See also ==
- List of census-designated places in Illinois
