= Nippersink Creek =

- Location of mouth

Location
- Country: United States
- State: Illinois, Wisconsin
- County: McHenry County, Illinois, Lake County, Illinois, Walworth County, Wisconsin

Physical characteristics
- Source
  - coordinates: 42.5019623°N 88.5056547°W
- Mouth
  - location: Wonder Lake, Illinois
  - coordinates: 42.4036317°N 88.1903637°W
- Length: 23 mi (37 km)
- Discharge
  - location: Fox Lake, Illinois
  - average: 159 cu/ft. per sec.

Nippersink Creek is a freshwater tributary that flows for 23 miles in the Illinois River / Fox River (Illinois River tributary) watershed, mostly in McHenry County, Illinois, within the Glacial Park Conservation Area, but also enters the Fox River / Chain O'Lakes area in Lake County, Illinois. The creek is managed by the McHenry County Conservation District with the exception of the sections that flow through private property.

The creek has a mean annual water discharge of 159 cubic feet per second and closes when water levels reach 650 cubic feet (or over 6.5 feet) as this makes passing under the creek's two bridges potentially hazardous. The creek and its wetlands support a diversity of fish, frogs, snakes, turtles, and other aquatic animals as well as shorebirds and water fowl. The creek itself is a shallow, calm waterway with some riffles that is a popular with kayakers and canoers during the spring and summer months; with three distinct launch sites - Keystone Landing, Pioneer Landing, and the Nippersink Canoe Base.

Shore fishing access exists at the various landings and within the Conservation area and common species calling the creek home include - channel catfish, bluegill, smallmouth bass, grass carp, green sunfish, walleye, and others.
