= Robert Mitchler =

American politician

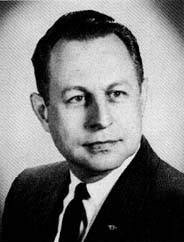
official portrait, circa 1967

Robert Walter Mitchler (June 4, 1920 – April 19, 2012) was an American politician and businessman.

Born in Aurora, Illinois, Mitchler went to the Aurora public schools. He served in the United States Navy during World War II and the Korean War. He received his bachelor's degree from Aurora College. Mitchler lived in Oswego, Illinois and worked for the Northern Illinois Gas Company. Mitchler was involved with the Republican Party. Mitchler served in the Illinois Senate from 1965 to 1981. He died at his home in Oswego, Illinois.
