= Joey Goodspeed =

American football player (born 1978)

No. 45, 44
- Position: Fullback

Personal information
- Born: February 22, 1978 (age 48); Berwyn, Illinois, U.S.
- Listed height: 6 ft 1 in (1.85 m)
- Listed weight: 247 lb (112 kg)

Career information
- High school: Oswego (Oswego, Illinois)
- College: Notre Dame
- NFL draft: 2000: undrafted

Career history
- Pittsburgh Steelers (2000)*; New Orleans Saints (2001)*; San Diego Chargers (2002); St. Louis Rams (2003–2004); Minnesota Vikings (2006)
- * Offseason or practice squad member only

Career NFL statistics
- Rushing attempts: 3
- Rushing yards: 6
- Rushing touchdowns: 1
- Receptions: 11
- Receiving yards: 71
- Stats at Pro Football Reference

Joseph Allen Goodspeed (born February 22, 1978) is an American former professional football player who was a fullback in the National Football League (NFL). He played college football for the Notre Dame Fighting Irish.

== Early life ==
Goodspeed attended Oswego High School in Oswego, Illinois, and was a star in football and track & field, along with playing basketball. In football, he was a 1995 SCHUTT All-American High School Football Team selection after being a three-year starter at both fullback and linebacker. As a senior, he rushed 120 times for 1,296 yards and 21 TDs from the fullback slot and averaged 18 tackles per game as a linebacker, while helping Oswego to 9–1 mark in 1995. He also averaged 42 yards per punt as a senior. He was named to Super 25 all-area team by Chicago Sun-Times for his efforts. As a junior, he was also an All-Conference pick in 1994 while carrying 123 times for 1,076 yards and 20 touchdowns. He'd been captain of the team as a junior and senior.

In track & field, he was a state qualifier on both the shot put and the discus his junior year.

== College career ==
Goodspeed was a four-year starter at Notre Dame University, where he rushed for 399 yards and scored two touchdowns – one on a 22-yard reception and another on a 33-yard blocked punt return.

As a senior for the Fighting Irish, he played and started in all eleven games with 22 rushes and he had 12 receptions for 91 yards and making countless key blocks for Jarius Jackson. As a junior, he played 12 games in 1998 as a backup to veteran Jamie Spencer at fullback. He ranked fourth in rushing with 202 yards, with his 7.0-yards-per-carry mark tops among Irish running backs and was on all the special teams. He was named ABC Sports/Chevrolet Notre Dame MVP vs. Arizona State. He was the Irish starter at fullback to begin the 1997 campaign, earning him the first-team assignment in the first three games of 1997. However, he separated his right shoulder on a fourth down fake-field goal attempt vs. Michigan State, which caused him to miss the last nine regular-season games as well as the Independence Bowl.

As a freshman, he played in nine games as a rookie fullback in 1996, working behind Marc Edwards and Jamie Spencer. He made 85 appearances with the Irish special teams to help become one of six freshmen to earn monograms. He had one pass reception that produced a 22-yard touchdown play vs. Pittsburgh and scored a touchdown on 33-yard return of blocked punt vs. Rutgers. He graduated from Notre Dame with a degree in management.

== Professional career ==
=== Pre-draft ===
Goodspeed measured 5 ft 11 5/8 in (1.819 m) and 253 lb (115 kg) and ran a 4.82-second 40-yard (37 m) dash at the Notre Dame pro day.

=== Pittsburgh Steelers ===
Goodspeed was signed by the Pittsburgh Steelers following the 2000 draft, but was released during training camp in September. He was signed by the Steelers Oct 17 to the practice squad, spending the final 10 games with the Steelers practice squad.

=== New Orleans Saints ===
In 2001, he spent training camp with the New Orleans Saints but did not make the team or practice squad.

=== San Diego Chargers ===
In 2002, he played 12 games with the San Diego Chargers, finishing second on the team with 12 special teams tackles. Goodspeed was released by the San Diego Chargers during the preseason in 2003.

=== St. Louis Rams ===
Goodspeed signed with the St. Louis Rams on October 28, 2003, where he played in the final eight games of the season, starting for four, but he did not have a rush or reception. Since Goodspeed joined the roster Marshall Faulk rushed for at least 100 yards in five times in November and December 2003. Goodspeed had his first offensive stat of his career with a 9-yard reception in a playoff game vs. Carolina. The next season in 2004, he played all 16 games with the Rams. He had his first rushing stat of his career rushing three times for 6 yards (including a 2-yard touchdown) and caught 11 passes for 71 yards which were all career-highs. Faulk and Steven Jackson combined for 5 100-yard games in 2004. Nonetheless, Goodspeed was released by the Rams on September 4, 2004, as part of the final round of cuts before the regular season. He had lost a battle with Madison Hedgecock for the fullback position with the Rams. He did not sign with anyone during the 2005 season and was out of football.

=== Minnesota Vikings ===
On 2006 he signed a one-year contract with the Minnesota Vikings and was expected to compete with Tony Richardson at fullback. However, he tore his left ACL at Vikings minicamp, which required surgery. He was placed on injured reserve and missed the season.

== Post-football career ==
He currently works for the NCSA Athletic Recruit Network as a collegiate scout. Joey is also an assistant football coach at Yorkville High School in Yorkville, Illinois.
