= Emma Murdock Van Deventer =

American mystery novelist

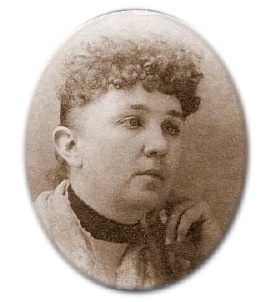
- Born: January 16, 1853; Oswego
- Died: May 3, 1914; Oswego
- Occupation: Writer

Emily "Emma" Medora Murdock Lynch Van Deventer (January 16, 1853 – May 3, 1914) was an American mystery novelist who wrote under the name Lawrence L. Lynch.

Emily Medora Murdock was born on January 16, 1853 in Oswego, Illinois, the daughter of Charles L. Murdock, a lawyer and justice of the peace, and Emily A. (Holland) Murdock. She married Lawrence L. Lynch in 1877 and Dr. Abraham Van Deventer in 1887.

She took the name of her first husband as her pseudonym for nearly two dozen detective novels popular in the US and England. Most of her novels were set in Chicago, and Against Odds (1894) was set at the 1893 Chicago World's Fair. Some of her heroes were traditionally male characters, such as Francis Ferrars, a Scotland Yard investigator who becomes a private detective in America. She was also noted for her independent female characters, such as the private detective Madeline Payne and Leonore Arymn, who strikes a woman batterer with a large mallet in Shadowed by Three.

Emma Murdock Van Deventer died on 3 May 1914 in Oswego.

== Bibliography ==
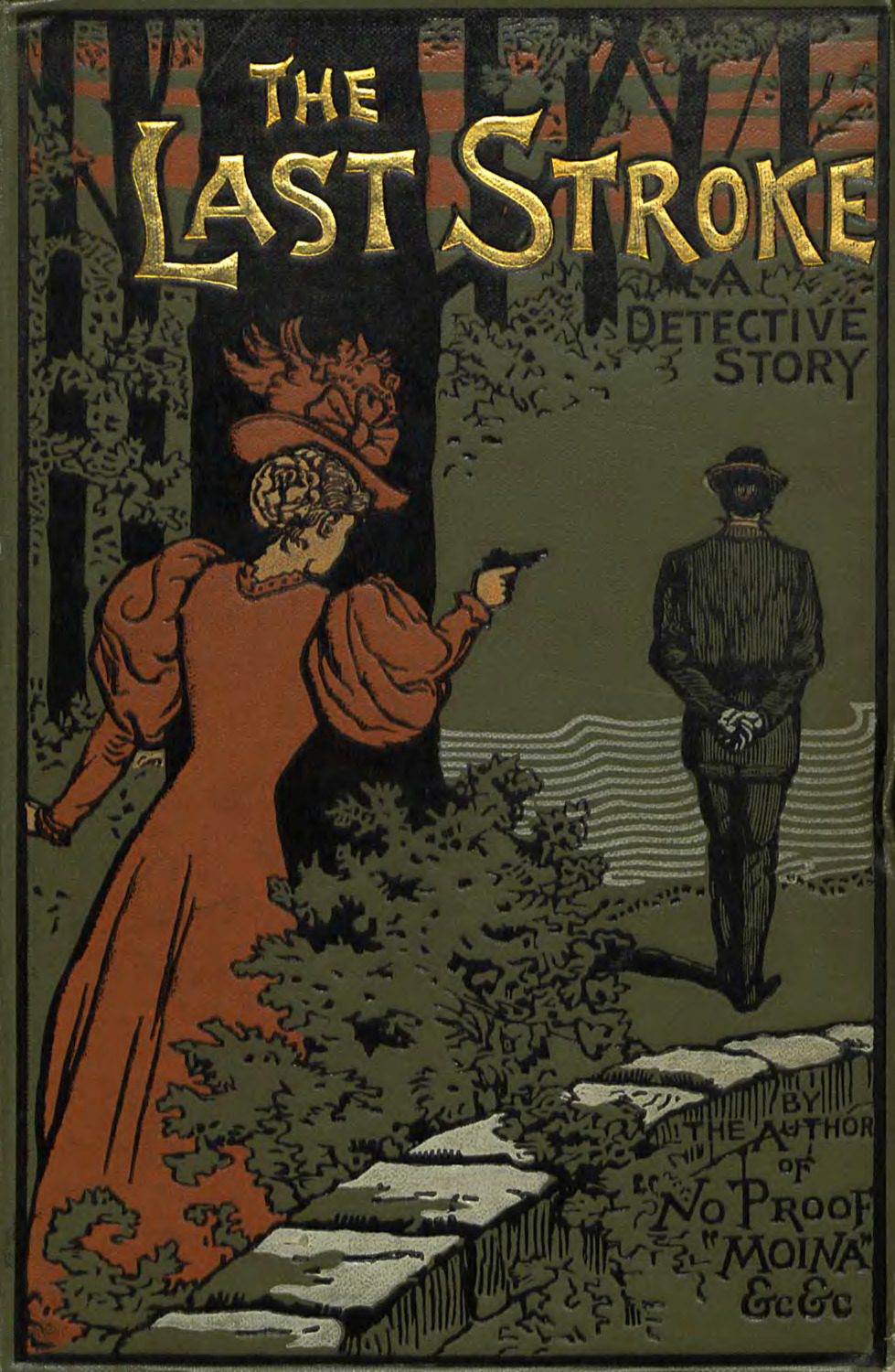
The Last Stroke: A Detective Story

- Shadowed by Three aka A Woman's Crime (1879)
- The Diamond Coterie (1884)
- Madeline Payne, the Detective's Daughter (1884)
- Dangerous Ground; or, The Rival Detectives (1885)
- Out of a Labyrinth (1885)
- A Mountain Mystery: or, The Outlaws of the Rockies (1886)
- The Lost Witness; or, The Mystery of Leah Paget Laird (1890)
- Moina; or, Against the Mighty (1891)
- A Slender Clue; or, The Mystery of Mardi Gras (1891)
- The Romance of a Bomb Thrower
- A Dead Man's Step (1893)
- Against Odds: A Romance of The Midway Plaisance (1894)
- No Proof (1895)
- The Last Stroke. A Detective Story (1896)
- The Unseen Hand (1898)
- High Stakes (1899)
- Under Fate's Wheel (1901)
- The Woman Who Dared (1902)
- The Danger Line (1903)
- A Woman's Tragedy; or, The Detective's Task (1904)
- The Doverfields' Diamonds (1906)
- Man and Master (1908)
- A Sealed Verdict (1910)
- A Blind Lead (1912)
