= Montgomery Dam =

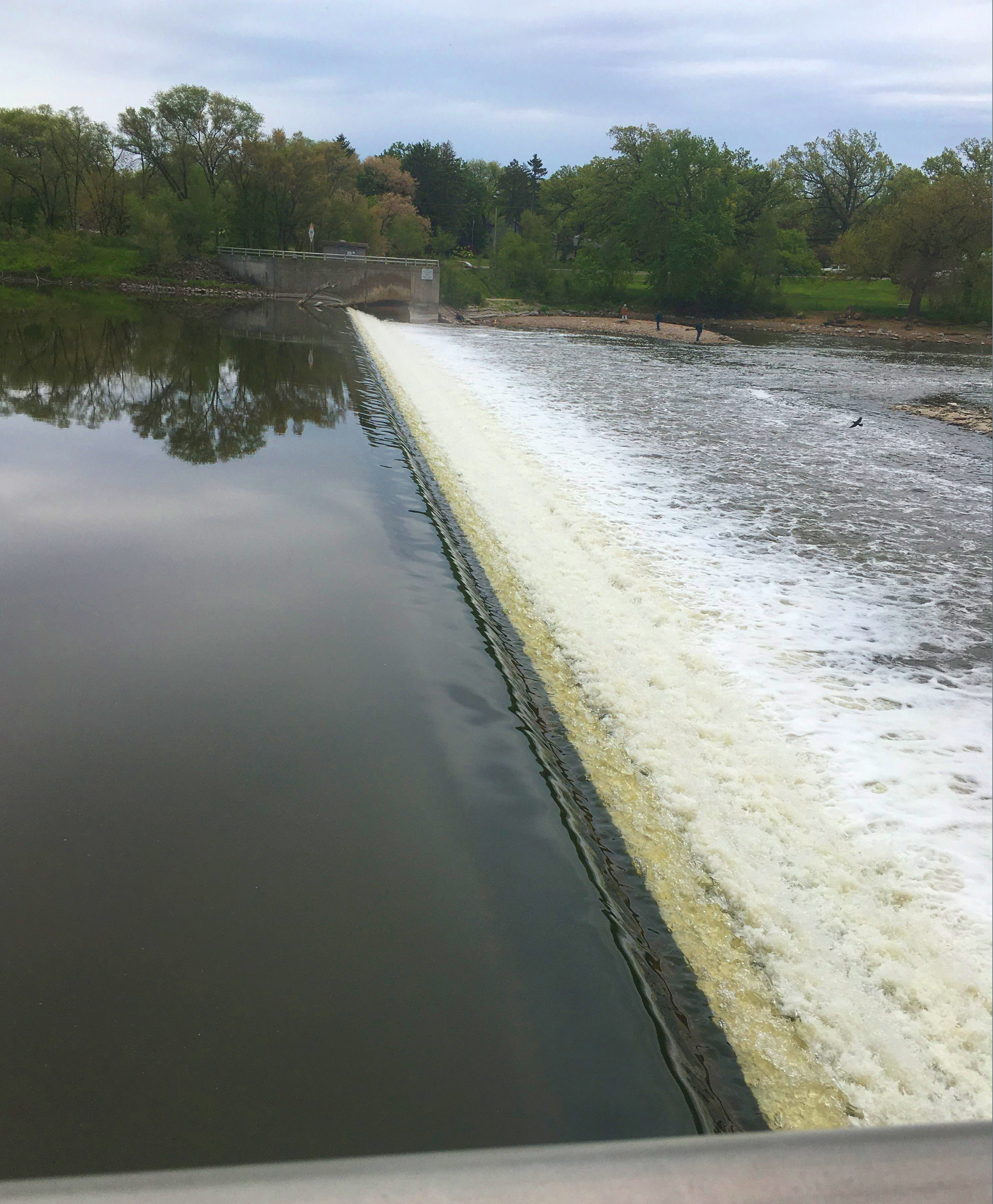
- Montgomery Dam located on the Fox river in Montgomery, Illinois
- Interactive map of Montgomery Dam
- Country: USA
- Location: Montgomery, Illinois
- Coordinates: 41°44′1.28″N 88°20′1.54″W
- Purpose: Flood control, Navigation
- Status: Operational
- Construction began: 1969
- Owner: Illinois Department of Natural Resources

Dam and spillways
- Type of dam: Gravity dam
- Impounds: Fox River
- Height (foundation): 7 ft (2.1 m)
- Length: 325 ft (99 m)

The Montgomery Dam is a gravity dam on the Fox River in Montgomery, Illinois. The dam was built for flood control and navigation in 1969 as a part of the Stratton project dam system which was designed to keep the river navagable from the Wisconsin border to the confluence with the Illinois River. It is owned by Illinois Department of Natural Resources.

The dam is 7 ft (2.1 m) high and 325 ft (99 m) long. It impounds 131 acre-feet (162,000 m^{3}). The Fox River watershed above the Montgomery Dam totals 1,732 square miles (4,490 km^{2}).

For many years, this dam and the upstream North Avenue Dam set the water levels for the Aurora, Illinois stretch of the Fox River. In 2006, the City of Aurora removed the North Avenue Dam, and advocates of a free-flowing river are now seeking removal of the Montgomery Dam as well.
