= Alex Magee =

American football player (born 1987)

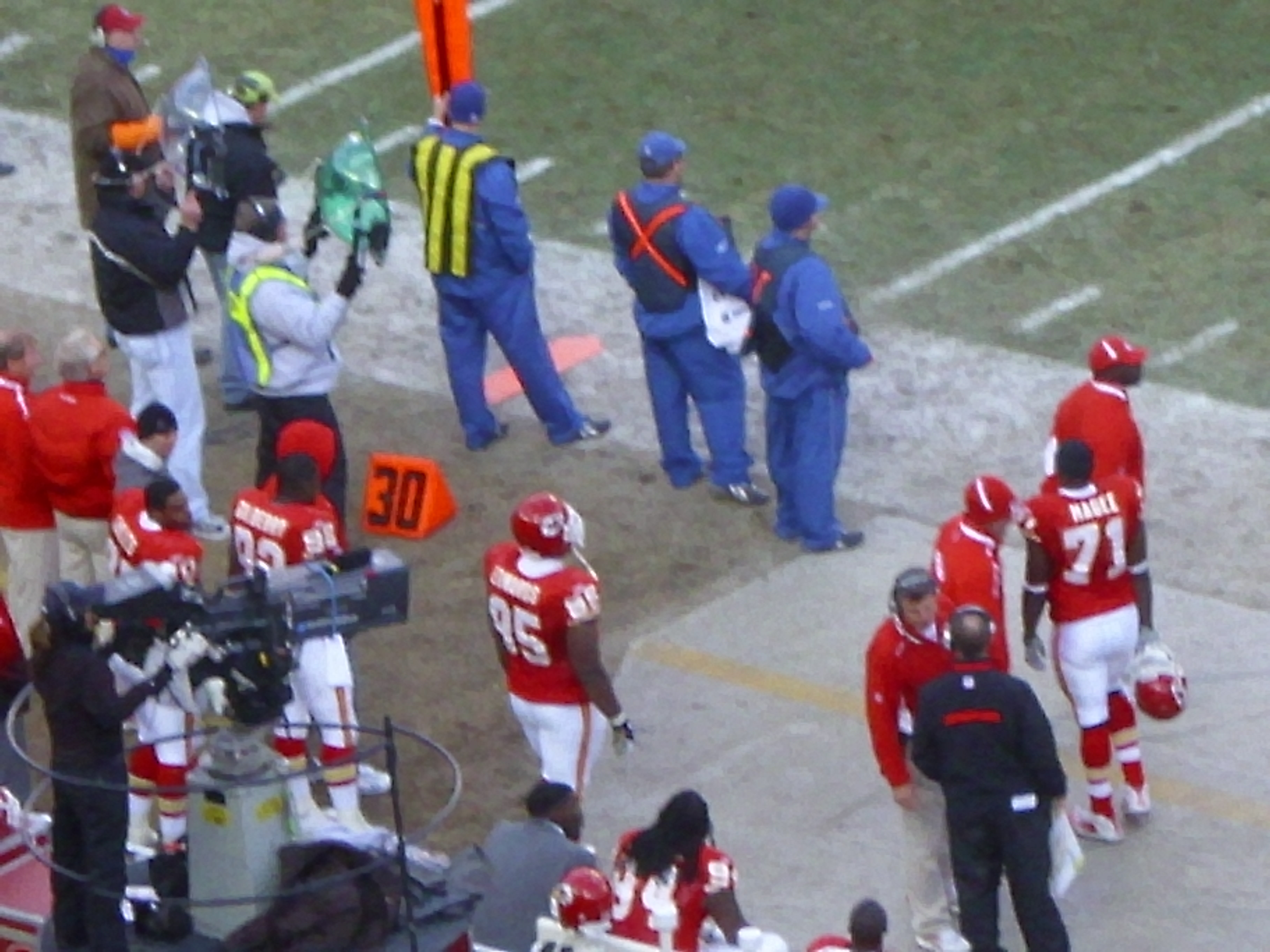
- Magee (#71) on the Chiefs sideline in 2009

No. 24, 71, 91, 97
- Position: Defensive end

Personal information
- Born: April 28, 1987 (age 39); Oswego, Illinois, U.S.
- Listed height: 6 ft 3 in (1.91 m)
- Listed weight: 298 lb (135 kg)

Career information
- High school: Oswego
- College: Purdue
- NFL draft: 2009: 3rd round, 67th overall pick

Career history
- Kansas City Chiefs (2009–2010); Tampa Bay Buccaneers (2010); Utah Blaze (2012); Chicago Rush (2013); Arizona Rattlers (2014–2015); Spokane Shock (2015)

Awards and highlights
- ArenaBowl champion (2014)

Career NFL statistics
- Total tackles: 18
- Sacks: 4.0
- Forced fumbles: 1
- Stats at Pro Football Reference

Career AFL statistics
- Tackles: 6
- Sacks: 2.0
- Forced fumbles: 2
- Pass breakups: 2
- Stats at ArenaFan.com

Alex Magee (born April 28, 1987) is an American former professional football player who was a defensive end in the National Football League (NFL). He was selected by the Kansas City Chiefs in the third round of the 2009 NFL draft. He played college football for the Purdue Boilermakers.

He also played for the Tampa Bay Buccaneers.

== Early life ==
MaGee was a two-time Class 7A First-team All-State as a junior and senior at Oswego High School. As a senior, he recorded 60 tackles, including 11 for loss and eight sacks. Magee also help lead his team to a 7A State Championship as the Oswego Panthers defeated the Libertyville Wildcats 28–21 in (2OT). NBC Sports Chicago listed Magee as one of the best defensive lineman in the history of Illinois high school football.

== College career ==
As a senior at Purdue in 2008, Magee played left defensive end, after being a right defensive end and had 28 tackles (14 solos) while causing and recovering a fumble. He also had career-high 3.5 sacks while making six stops behind the line of scrimmage. In 2007 Magee started all 13 games and recorded 38 tackles (24 solo) with 4.5 going for losses and he also broke up 2 passes, forced a fumble, recovered two fumbles, and blocked two kicks. In 2006, he appeared in all 14 games including seven starts, and had 33 tackles (20 solo, 13 assists) including 2.5 sacks, with one interception, one forced fumble, one fumble recovery. and one blocked kick. In 2005, he played in all 11 games, with two starts and had 18 tackles (10 solo, 8 assists), including 1.0 for loss.

== Professional career ==
Pre-draft measurables
Height	Weight	Arm length	Hand span	40-yard dash	10-yard split	20-yard split	20-yard shuttle	Three-cone drill	Vertical jump	Broad jump	Bench press
6 ft 2 5/8 in (1.90 m)	298 lb (135 kg)	35 in (0.89 m)	9 1/2 in (0.24 m)	5.09 s	1.80 s	2.95 s	4.55 s	7.52 s	29 1/2 in (0.75 m)	8 ft 7 in (2.62 m)	30 reps
Arm and hand spans from Pro Day, all other values from NFL Combine.

=== Kansas City Chiefs ===
Magee was selected 67th overall in the third round by the Kansas City Chiefs. He played at the defensive end spot in the Chiefs' new 3-4 defense.

=== Tampa Bay Buccaneers ===
On October 19, 2010, Magee was traded to the Tampa Bay Buccaneers for conditional draft picks. He was cut on September 3, 2011.

=== Utah Blaze ===
On June 19, 2012, Magee was assigned to the Utah Blaze of the Arena Football League.

=== Chicago Rush ===
On June 21, 2013, Magee was assigned to the Chicago Rush. Magee finished the season with the Rush, recording 2.0 sacks playing in just 3 games.

=== Arizona Rattlers ===
On September 6, 2013, Magee was assigned to the Arizona Rattlers after he was selected in the dispersal draft of Rush and Blaze players. He was placed on recallable reassignment on May 26, 2015.

=== Spokane Shock ===
On June 3, 2015, Magee was assigned to the Spokane Shock. He was placed on reassignment on June 16, 2015.
