= Montgomery, Illinois =

- Village
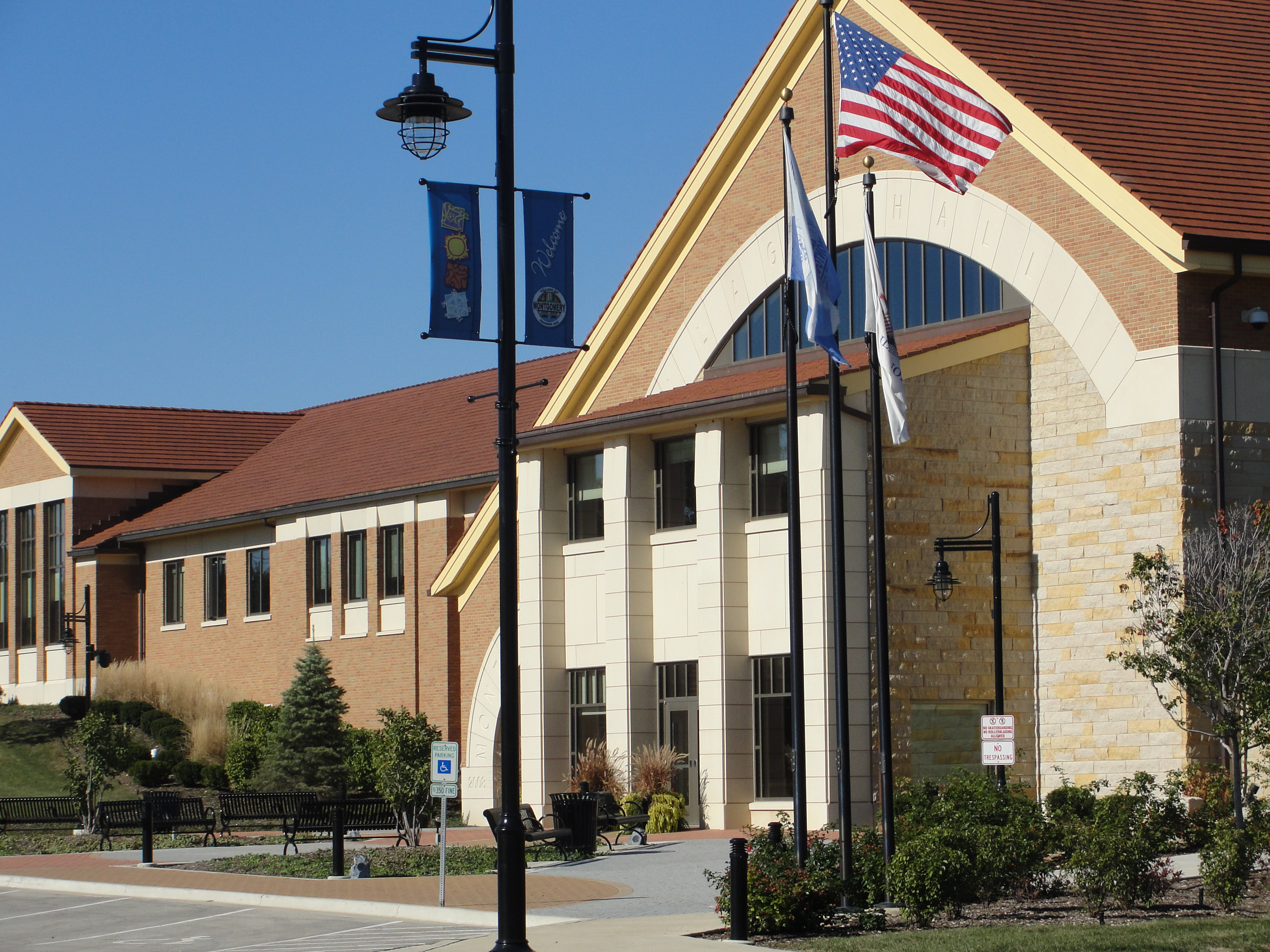
- Village Hall

- Flag Seal

- Location of Montgomery in Kendall County, Illinois

- Location of Illinois in the United States
- Coordinates: 41°43′08″N 88°23′33″W
- Country: United States
- State: Illinois
- Counties: Kane, Kendall
- Townships: Aurora (Kane), Bristol (Kendall), Oswego (Kendall), Sugar Grove (Kane)
- Settled: 1832
- Incorporated: February 17, 1858

Government
  - Village President: Matthew Brolley

Area
  - Total: 9.54 sq mi (24.72 km^{2})
  - Land: 9.30 sq mi (24.08 km^{2})
  - Water: 0.25 sq mi (0.64 km^{2})
- Elevation: 663 ft (202 m)

Population (2020)
  - Total: 20,262
  - Density: 2,179.0/sq mi (841.32/km^{2})
- Time zone: UTC−6 (CST)
  - Summer (DST): UTC−5 (CDT)
- ZIP Code: 60538
- Area codes: 630/331
- FIPS code: 17-50218
- GNIS feature ID: 2399387
- Wikimedia Commons: Montgomery, Illinois
- Website: www.montgomeryil.org

Montgomery is a village within the Chicago Metropolitan Area of Kane and Kendall counties, Illinois. The village is a suburb/exurb of Chicago located roughly 45 miles (72 km) southwest of the city. The population was 20,262 at the 2020 census.

== History ==
The first European settler arriving in the area was Jacob Carpenter, who came to the Chicago area from Logan County, Ohio, in November 1832. In the fall of 1835, Daniel S. Gray, from Montgomery County, New York, visited the area where his brother Nicholas Gray had located in the previous spring, on a farm now within the limits of Kendall County. He made immediate preparations to settle there, and in the fall of 1836, after his family moved from New York state, he built the first wooden house in the area. It was located in the southern part of what is now Montgomery, near the west bank of the Fox River.

Daniel Gray is considered the founder of Montgomery, and bought land grants from the federal government, and had ownership of large tracts of land.

The settlement was called "Graystown" for several years, but eventually Gray convinced other settlers to call the small village "Montgomery" after the New York county where he and several other settlers had origins.

Daniel Gray founded many companies in Montgomery, including a tavern, store, warehouse, foundry, combine and fabrication shop, and one of the best stone grain mills in the county (Gray–Watkins Mill). Gray was making preparations for more business operations, including the establishment of a stationary engine factory, when he died in October 1855. Upon his death, he still owned the majority of the lots in the village. His heirs continued to sell these lots and the village continued to grow.

On February 17, 1858, the village of Montgomery was incorporated. Ralph Gray, son of Daniel Gray, was elected as the first village president. The population of Montgomery remained fairly consistent at about 300 people during the rest of the 1800s.

For much of the twentieth century, the village grew slowly and steadily. Lyon Metal was founded in Montgomery in 1904, and participated in the war effort of World War II. The Aurora Caterpillar manufacturing plant located along the southern border of Montgomery has been producing wheel-loaders since 1959. Western Electric had its Montgomery Works plant along River Street, which became Lucent Technologies and was closed in 1995. In 1962, this factory employed 1,500 people and made telephone parts.

== Geography ==
Montgomery is located in southern Kane County and northern Kendall County. It is bordered to the north and east by Aurora, to the south by Oswego and Boulder Hill, and to the southwest by Yorkville. The village sits on both sides of the Fox River. U.S. Route 30 passes through the village, leading southeast 11 miles (18 km) to Plainfield and northwest 7 miles (11 km) to Sugar Grove. Illinois Route 31 runs through the village on the west side of the Fox River, leading northeast 2.5 miles (4.0 km) to the center of Aurora and southwest 3.5 miles (5.6 km) to the center of Oswego. Illinois Route 25 runs along the east side of the Fox River, also leading to Aurora and Oswego.

According to the 2021 census gazetteer files, Montgomery has a total area of 9.55 square miles (24.73 km^{2}), of which 9.30 square miles (24.09 km^{2}) (97.41%) is land and 0.25 square miles (0.65 km^{2}) (2.59%) is water.

== Demographics ==
Historical population
Census	Pop.	Note	%±
1880	200		—
1890	263		31.5%
1900	350		33.1%
1910	371		6.0%
1920	463		24.8%
1930	546		17.9%
1940	607		11.2%
1950	773		27.3%
1960	2,122		174.5%
1970	3,278		54.5%
1980	3,369		2.8%
1990	4,267		26.7%
2000	5,471		28.2%
2010	18,438		237.0%
2020	20,262		9.9%
U.S. Decennial Census; 2010 2020

=== Racial and ethnic composition ===
Montgomery village, Illinois – Racial and ethnic composition Note: the US Census treats Hispanic/Latino as an ethnic category. This table excludes Latinos from the racial categories and assigns them to a separate category. Hispanics/Latinos may be of any race.
Race / Ethnicity (NH = Non-Hispanic)	Pop 2000	Pop 2010	Pop 2020	% 2000	% 2010	% 2020
White alone (NH)	4,452	11,119	9,929	81.37%	60.30%	49.00%
Black or African American alone (NH)	162	1,464	1,901	2.96%	7.94%	9.38%
Native American or Alaska Native alone (NH)	19	10	11	0.35%	0.05%	0.05%
Asian alone (NH)	44	585	640	0.80%	3.17%	3.16%
Pacific Islander alone (NH)	2	4	4	0.04%	0.02%	0.02%
Other race alone (NH)	2	13	77	0.04%	0.07%	0.38%
Mixed race or Multiracial (NH)	49	320	832	0.90%	1.74%	4.11%
Hispanic or Latino (any race)	741	4,923	6,868	13.54%	26.70%	33.90%
Total	5,471	18,438	20,262	100.00%	100.00%	100.00%

=== 2020 census ===
As of the 2020 census, Montgomery had a population of 20,262. The population density was 2,122.56 inhabitants per square mile (819.52/km^{2}). The median age was 33.9 years. 30.0% of residents were under the age of 18 and 8.6% of residents were 65 years of age or older. For every 100 females there were 96.4 males, and for every 100 females age 18 and over there were 93.8 males age 18 and over.

99.7% of residents lived in urban areas, while 0.3% lived in rural areas.

There were 6,435 households in Montgomery and 4,397 families residing in the village. Of households, 48.8% had children under the age of 18 living in them. Of all households, 59.5% were married-couple households, 12.4% were households with a male householder and no spouse or partner present, and 21.0% were households with a female householder and no spouse or partner present. About 18.1% of all households were made up of individuals and 7.2% had someone living alone who was 65 years of age or older.

There were 6,600 housing units, of which 2.5% were vacant. The average housing unit density was 691.39 per square mile (266.95/km^{2}). The homeowner vacancy rate was 0.8% and the rental vacancy rate was 5.4%.

=== Income and poverty ===
The median income for a household in the village was $99,208, and the median income for a family was $105,277. Males had a median income of $58,096 versus $37,277 for females. The per capita income for the village was $31,097. About 2.9% of families and 4.8% of the population were below the poverty line, including 4.1% of those under age 18 and 5.1% of those age 65 or over.

== Arts and culture ==
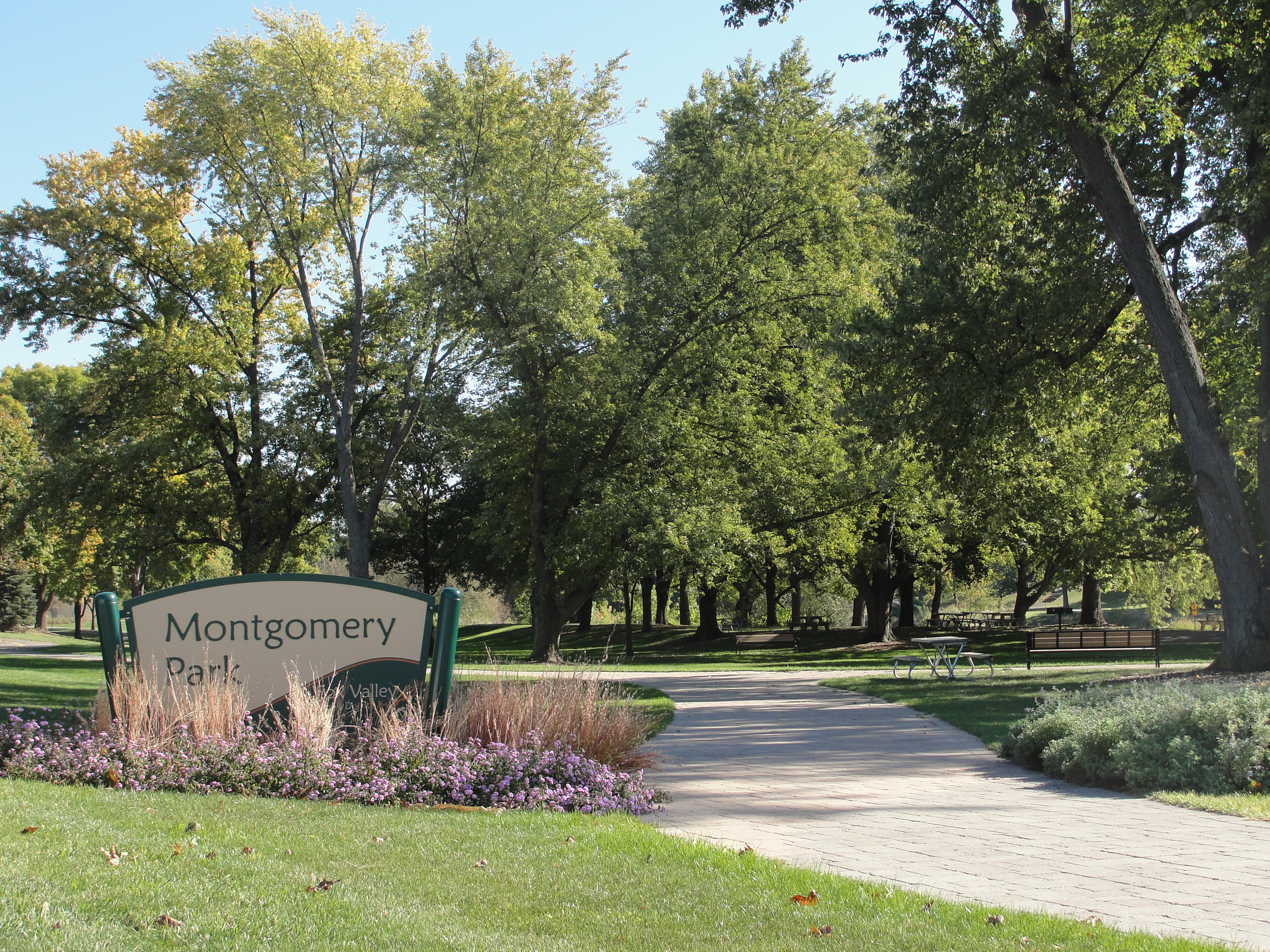
Montgomery Park

The annual Montgomery Fest is held the second weekend in August each year. The fest typically includes a parade, activities for families, and a large fireworks display.

== Notable people ==
- Philip Keck, New York lawyer, judge, and politician; lived in Montgomery, on a farm, with an uncle.
- Carole Mathews, actress; appeared on the NBC-TV western series The Californians (1958–1959); Miss Chicago (1938).
- Sean Rash, professional ten-pin bowler originally from Colorado, now residing in Montgomery.

== See also ==
- Montgomery Dam
