= Oswego Community Unit School District 308 =

Public school district in Oswego, Illinois, USA

Address
- 4175 Route 71 Oswego, Illinois, 60543
- Coordinates: 41°38′54.873″N 88°18′16.166″W

District information
- Type: Public
- Motto: World-Class Schools Serving Caring Communities
- Grades: PreK-12
- Superintendent: Dr. Andalib Khelghati
- Governing agency: Illinois Department of Education
- Schools: 22 (2018-19)
- NCES District ID: 1730270

Students and staff
- Students: 17,950
- Teachers: 1,103.1 (FTE)
- Student–teacher ratio: 16.27 to 1

Other information
- Website: sd308.org

Community Unit School District 308 is a public school district located in Oswego, Kendall County, Illinois. The Superintendent of Schools is Andalib Khelghati. The district headquarters is in Oswego, Illinois. The district includes 22 schools, including one early learning center, 14 elementary schools for grades K-5, 5 junior high schools for grades 6–8, and 2 high schools. The district serves Oswego, Aurora, Montgomery, Plainfield, Yorkville, and Joliet. Total enrollment as of 2012 was about 18,000 students. Oswego 308 is the seventh largest public school district in Illinois out of 868.

== Schools ==
Oswego Community Unit School District 308 currently has 22 schools in total in operation.

=== Preschool ===
School's name	Location	Year opened
Brokaw Early Learning Center	Oswego	2007

=== Elementary schools ===
School's name	Location	Year opened
Boulder Hill Elementary	Boulder Hill Subdivision	1961
Churchill Elementary	Oswego	2005
East View Kindergarten Center	Oswego	1957
Fox Chase Elementary	Oswego	2001
Grande Park Elementary	Plainfield	2007
Homestead Elementary	Aurora	2002
Hunt Club Elementary	Oswego	2009
Lakewood Creek Elementary	Montgomery	2004
Long Beach Elementary	Montgomery	1967
Old Post Elementary	Oswego	1996
Prairie Point Elementary	Oswego	2005
Southbury Elementary	Oswego	2008
The Wheatlands Elementary	Aurora	2001
Wolf's Crossing Elementary	Aurora	2005

=== Junior High schools ===
School's name	Location	Year opened
Bednarcik Jr. High	Aurora	2002
Plank Jr. High School	Oswego	2006
Thompson Jr. High	Oswego	1977
Traughber Junior High	Oswego	2008 (new building) 1948 (old building)
Murphy Junior High	Plainfield	2012

=== High schools ===
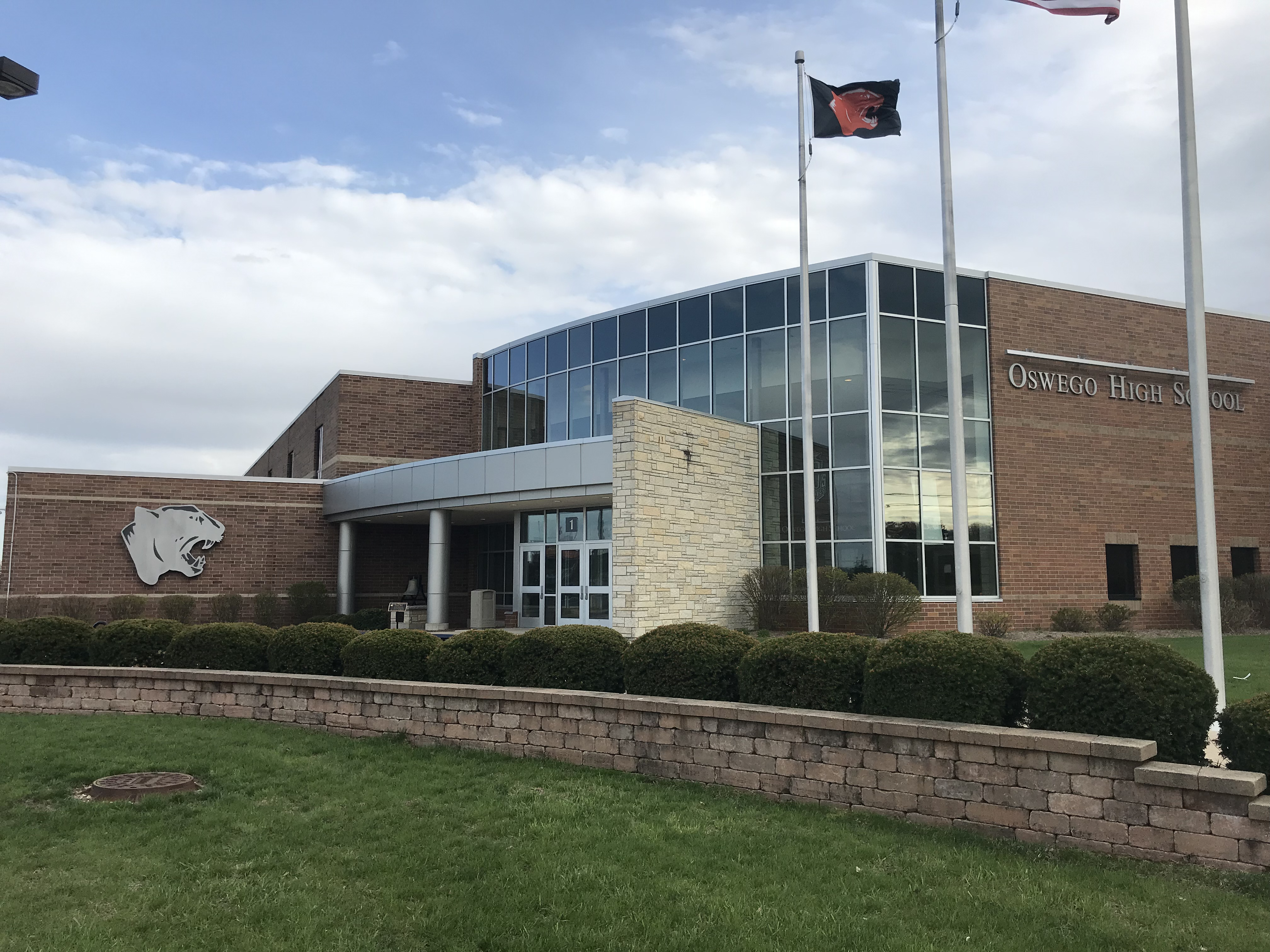
The main entrance of Oswego High School

School's name	Location	Year opened
Oswego East High School	Oswego	2004
Oswego High School	Oswego	1867 (original building), 1964 (current building)
