= Keith R. Wheeler =

American politician

Keith Wheeler

Member of the Illinois House of Representatives from the 50th district
- In office January 14, 2015 – January 11, 2023
- Preceded by: Kay Hatcher
- Succeeded by: Barbara Hernandez

Personal details
- Party: Republican
- Spouse: Lisa
- Children: One Child; Two Stepchildren
- Education: University of Illinois (B.S.)

Keith R. Wheeler is an American Republican politician and former member of the Illinois House of Representatives. He represented the 50th District from 2015 to 2023. The 50th district included municipalities in southern Kane and Kendall counties.

== Illinois House of Representatives ==
Wheeler was elected to the Illinois House in 2014, defeating three other Republicans in a primary and a Democrat in the general election. He was reelected in 2016, 2018, and 2020. Wheeler served as an Assistant Republican Leader.

After new legislative maps were drawn to fit the results of the 2020 census, Wheeler opted to seek a fifth term in the House in the new 83rd District. He lost to Democratic nominee Matt Hanson.

=== Committee assignments ===
In the 102nd General Assembly, Wheeler was the Co-Chair of the House Administrative Rules Committee. He also sat on the House Committees on Cybersecurity, Data Analytics, and IT; Executive; Labor and Commerce; Prescription Drug Affordability and Accessibility; and Public Utilities.

== Electoral history ==
Illinois 50th State House District Republican Primary, 2014
Party	Candidate	Votes	%
Republican	Keith R. Wheeler	5,849	52.50
Republican	Julie Cosimo	2,003	17.98
Republican	Beth C. Goncher	1,852	16.62
Republican	William F. Keck	1,437	12.90
Total votes		11,141	100.0

Illinois 50th State House District General Election, 2014
Party	Candidate	Votes	%
Republican	Keith R. Wheeler	23,260	67.88
Democratic	Valerie L. Burd	11,007	32.12
Total votes		34,267	100.0

Illinois 50th State House District General Election, 2016
Party	Candidate	Votes	%
Republican	Keith R. Wheeler (incumbent)	31,659	60.32
Democratic	Valerie L. Burd	20,830	39.68
Total votes		52,489	100.0

Illinois 50th State House District General Election, 2018
Party	Candidate	Votes	%
Republican	Keith R. Wheeler (incumbent)	25,862	54.99
Democratic	James G. Leslie	21,170	45.01
Total votes		47,032	100.0

Illinois 50th State House District General Election, 2020
Party	Candidate	Votes	%
Republican	Keith R. Wheeler (incumbent)	35,817	56.4
Democratic	Kate Monteleone	27,661	43.6
Total votes		63,478	100.0

Illinois 83rd State House District General Election, 2022
Party	Candidate	Votes	%
Democratic	Matt Hanson	20,422	53.5
Republican	Keith R. Wheeler	17,739	46.5
Total votes		38,161	100.0

== Post-legislative career ==
On December 19, 2023, it was announced that Wheeler would join the governmental affairs team of the Illinois Chamber of Commerce.
