= Oswego, Illinois =

Village in Illinois, US

Oswego, Illinois Lodi
- Village
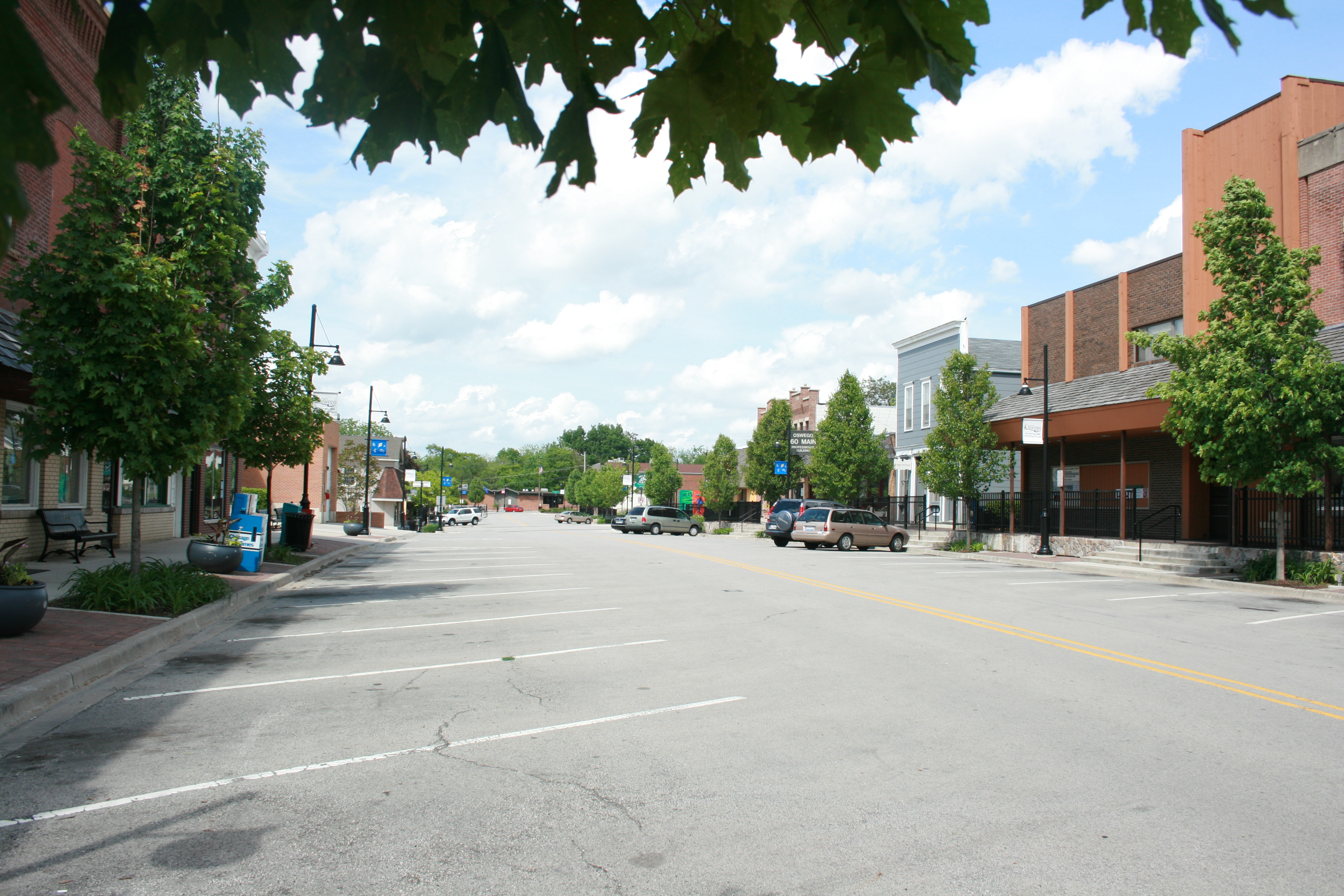
- Downtown Oswego

- Flag Logo

- Location of Oswego in Kendall and Will counties, Illinois

- Location within Chicago metropolitan area Location within Illinois Location within the United States
- Coordinates: 41°41′10″N 88°20′30″W
- Country: United States
- State: Illinois
- Counties: Kendall, Will
- Townships: Oswego, Bristol, Wheatland
- Settled: 1833
- Incorporated: 1852

Government
  - Village President: Ryan Kauffman

Area
  - Total: 15.03 sq mi (38.93 km^{2})
  - Land: 14.89 sq mi (38.56 km^{2})
  - Water: 0.15 sq mi (0.38 km^{2})
- Elevation: 659 ft (201 m)

Population (2020)
  - Total: 34,585
  - Density: 2,323.0/sq mi (896.93/km^{2})
- Time zone: UTC−6 (CST)
  - Summer (DST): UTC−5 (CDT)
- ZIP code: 60543
- Area codes: 630/331
- FIPS code: 17-56887
- GNIS feature ID: 2399593
- Website: www.oswegoil.org

Oswego (/ɒsˈwiːɡoʊ/ oss-WEE-goh) is a village in Kendall and Will counties, Illinois, United States. Per the 2020 census, the population was 34,485. Oswego is the largest municipality in Kendall County. Part of the Chicago metropolitan area, it is an exurb of Chicago.

== History ==
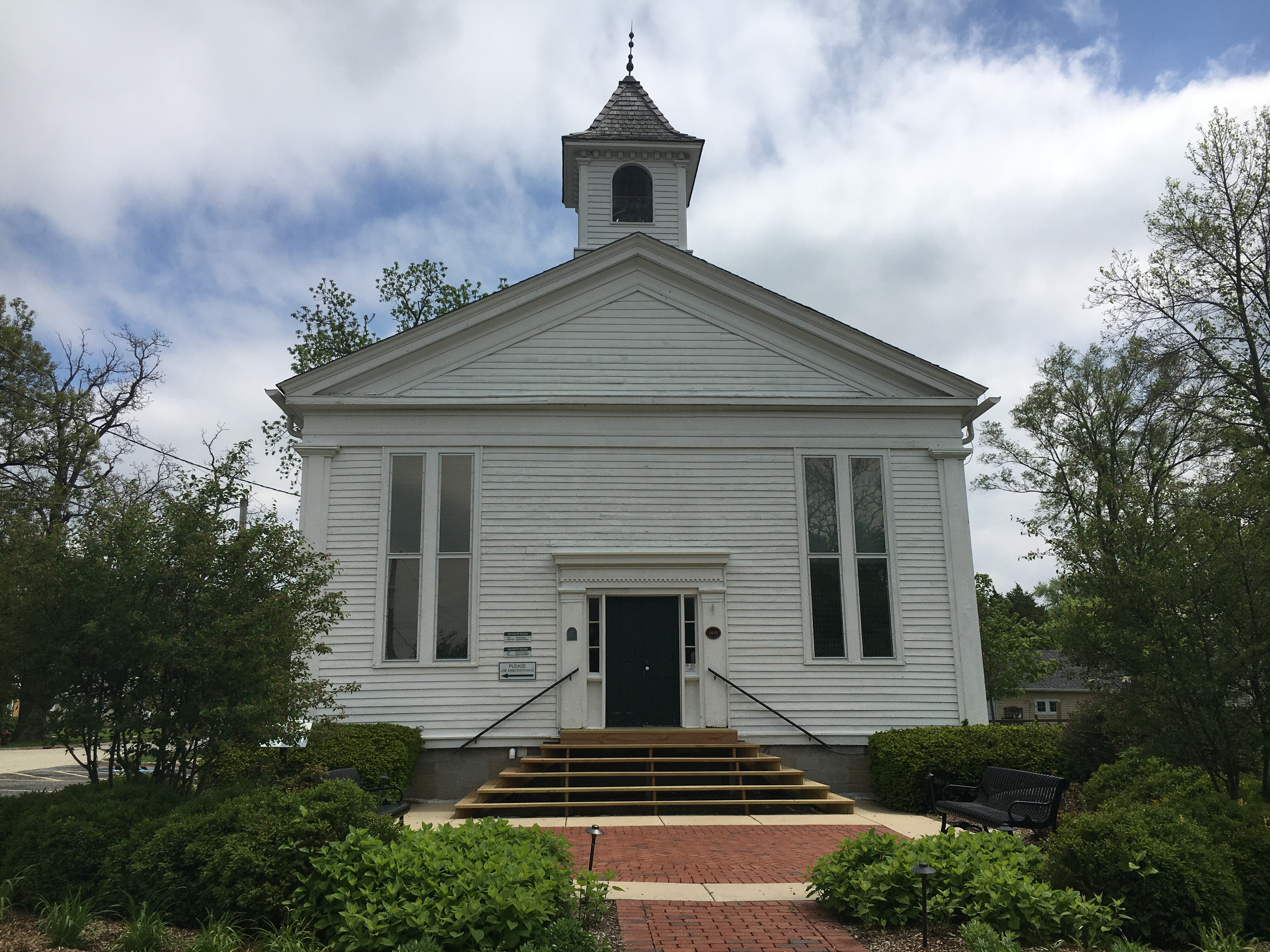
The Little White School Museum in downtown Oswego was built in 1850.

In 1833, William Smith Wilson, his wife Rebecca, and his brother-in-law Daniel Pearce moved to the area now known as Oswego. The land belonged to the local Potawatomi, Ottawa, and Chippewa tribes, but the United States government removed the Native Americans when the government started surveying the land along the Fox River in Kendall County. In 1842, the federal government placed the land for sale at an established price of $1.25 an acre.

After the sale of the land, Lewis Brinsmaid Judson and Levi F. Arnold from New York laid out the village and named it "Hudson". However, when a post office was established, its location was given as "Lodi". Confusion over the official name of the area resulted in a decision in January 1837, when the citizens gathered and voted "Oswego" as the permanent name of the village by a single vote. The village was named after Oswego, New York, "Oswego" being an Iroquois word meaning "mouth of the stream". The ford across the Fox River in the town allowed Oswego to grow economically and as a town, eventually incorporated in 1852 with its village boundaries at the time being Harrison Street to the northwest, Jefferson Street to the northeast, Monroe Street to the southeast, and Benton Street to the southwest. At the advent of the automobile, Oswego continued to see growth as it became a hub for three different state highways (Illinois Route 25, Illinois Route 71, and Illinois Route 31).

Major community developments began when Caterpillar Inc. and Western Electric built industrial plants near Oswego in the mid-1950s. This initially allowed nearby Boulder Hill to develop. The next major development arrived in the mid-1980s during the suburban homebuilding boom, which allowed houses and buildings to populate the village. The rapid growth of the village allowed its limits to expand west of the Fox River into today's boundaries.

Oswego is known to some Chicago-area residents for the town dragstrip on State Route 34, which was open from 1955 until 1979, where muscle cars were raced by drivers from all over the Midwest. The drag days are still celebrated even though the strip has been closed for decades. Although evidence of the drag strip, including parts of the track, still remain, the site is off limits to the public.

== Geography ==
Oswego is located in northeastern Kendall County on the Fox River with a small portion in Will County. It is bordered to the north by Boulder Hill and Montgomery, to the east by Aurora, and to the west by Yorkville, the Kendall county seat.

According to the 2021 census gazetteer files, Oswego has a total area of 15.03 square miles (38.93 km^{2}), of which 14.89 square miles (38.56 km^{2}) (or 99.04%) is land and 0.15 square miles (0.39 km^{2}) (or 0.96%) is water.

=== Downtown ===
Downtown Oswego is home to historic buildings and homes, as well as shops and restaurants. The Village of Oswego launched a project to enhance and restore the historic downtown district. This project included significant infrastructure and streetscape improvements, such as the installation of brick pavers, sidewalks, landscaping, and decorative streetlights and benches. Hudson Crossing Park, located along the Fox River, opened in October 2004 where many children and families enjoy the scenery. The Waubonsee Creek Promenade, which stretches from Main Street to the new park, is the final phase of the downtown enhancements. In 2008, the village celebrated its 175th anniversary.

=== Recreation and leisure ===
The Oswego area is home to over 1,100 acres (450 ha) of open land, trails, and parks maintained by the Oswegoland Park District. Established in 1950, this governmental agency is guided to "create opportunities for a healthy community". Overseeing 63 parks, 16 miles (26 km) of walking trails, two aquatic parks, and the Little White School Museum, the park district provides offerings for the community of 20,000 households as well as visitors from farther away.

The Oswego area holds several races for fitness enthusiasts. Several area festivals are coordinated by the park district, such as the annual PrairieFest.

=== Climate ===
Oswego has a hot-summer humid continental climate, typical for the Midwest region. More particularly, it is in the Köppen Dfa zone. In the Köppen Dfa zone precipitation is usually amble, especially in the summer months. In the Dfa zones the spring and summer months can have severe weather, including tornadoes, when the polar front is in the southern margin of the zone. The region has four distinct seasons. Winters tend to be cold and have ample snow; blizzards are a possibility. Springs tend to be humid, and can have precipitation and storms. Summers tend to be hot and have the highest precipitation overall as well as storms. Fall tends to cool down.

Climate data for Oswego, IL Climate normals based on SSE Oswego(rain)/Aurora(temps) (1990-2021)
Month	Jan	Feb	Mar	Apr	May	Jun	Jul	Aug	Sep	Oct	Nov	Dec	Year
Mean daily maximum °F (°C)	30.5 (−0.8)	34.9 (1.6)	47.0 (8.3)	58.9 (14.9)	71.1 (21.7)	80.5 (26.9)	84.0 (28.9)	82.1 (27.8)	75.8 (24.3)	62.8 (17.1)	47.8 (8.8)	35.6 (2.0)	59.2 (15.1)
Daily mean °F (°C)	23.2 (−4.9)	23.2 (−4.9)	37.9 (3.3)	49.6 (9.8)	60.6 (15.9)	70.3 (21.3)	74.4 (23.6)	72.6 (22.6)	65.5 (18.6)	53.0 (11.7)	39.7 (4.3)	28.7 (−1.8)	49.9 (10.0)
Mean daily minimum °F (°C)	16.0 (−8.9)	19.5 (−6.9)	28.9 (−1.7)	39.3 (4.1)	50.1 (10.1)	60.1 (15.6)	64.8 (18.2)	63.1 (17.3)	55.3 (12.9)	43.1 (6.2)	31.7 (−0.2)	21.8 (−5.7)	41.1 (5.1)
Average precipitation inches (mm)	2.14 (54)	1.99 (51)	2.46 (62)	3.87 (98)	4.76 (121)	4.36 (111)	4.43 (113)	4.01 (102)	3.33 (85)	3.39 (86)	2.66 (68)	2.13 (54)	39.53 (1,005)
Average snowfall inches (cm)	9.1 (23)	9.1 (23)	2.6 (6.6)	0.6 (1.5)	0 (0)	0 (0)	0 (0)	0.0 (0.0)	0 (0)	0 (0)	1.3 (3.3)	6.4 (16)	29.1 (73.4)
Source: NOAA

== Demographics ==
Historical population
Census	Pop.	Note	%±
1880	663		—
1890	641		−3.3%
1900	618		−3.6%
1910	600		−2.9%
1920	676		12.7%
1930	932		37.9%
1940	978		4.9%
1950	1,220		24.7%
1960	1,510		23.8%
1970	1,862		23.3%
1980	3,021		62.2%
1990	3,876		28.3%
2000	13,326		243.8%
2010	30,355		127.8%
2020	34,585		13.9%
U.S. Decennial Census; 2010 2020

=== Racial and ethnic composition ===
Oswego village, Illinois – racial and ethnic composition Note: the US Census treats Hispanic/Latino as an ethnic category. This table excludes Latinos from the racial categories and assigns them to a separate category. Hispanics/Latinos may be of any race.
Race / ethnicity (NH = Non-Hispanic)	Pop 2000	Pop 2010	Pop 2020	% 2000	% 2010	% 2020
White alone (NH)	12,079	23,700	23,400	90.64%	78.08%	67.66%
Black or African American alone (NH)	236	1,518	2,574	1.77%	5.00%	7.44%
Native American or Alaska Native alone (NH)	24	26	30	0.18%	0.09%	0.09%
Asian alone (NH)	183	1,022	1,588	1.37%	3.37%	4.59%
Native Hawaiian or Pacific Islander alone (NH)	3	9	7	0.02%	0.03%	0.02%
Other race alone (NH)	17	45	153	0.13%	0.15%	0.44%
Mixed-race or multiracial (NH)	119	479	1,417	0.89%	1.58%	4.10%
Hispanic or Latino (any race)	665	3,556	5,416	4.99%	11.71%	15.66%
Total	13,326	30,335	34,585	100.00%	100.00%	100.00%

=== 2020 census ===
As of the 2020 census, Oswego had a population of 34,585. The population density was 2,300.61 inhabitants per square mile (888.27/km^{2}).

The median age was 36.8 years. 28.6% of residents were under the age of 18 and 10.7% of residents were 65 years of age or older. For every 100 females there were 94.7 males, and for every 100 females age 18 and over there were 90.9 males age 18 and over.

95.8% of residents lived in urban areas, while 4.2% lived in rural areas.

There were 11,476 households in Oswego, including 9,294 families. Of all households, 45.5% had children under the age of 18 living in them, 63.7% were married-couple households, 10.5% were households with a male householder and no spouse or partner present, and 20.8% were households with a female householder and no spouse or partner present. About 17.4% of all households were made up of individuals and 7.1% had someone living alone who was 65 years of age or older. The average household size was 3.49 and the average family size was 3.06.

There were 11,886 housing units at an average density of 790.66 per square mile (305.28/km^{2}); 3.4% were vacant. The homeowner vacancy rate was 1.2% and the rental vacancy rate was 8.4%.

=== Income and poverty ===
The median income for a household in the village was $97,330, and the median income for a family was $114,437. Males had a median income of $57,338 versus $42,412 for females. The per capita income for the village was $37,053. About 0.0% of families and 1.7% of the population were below the poverty line, including 0.0% of those under age 18 and 6.0% of those age 65 or over.

== Economy ==
According to the Village's 2024 Comprehensive Annual Financial Report, the top employers in the village are:

Top employers in Oswego (2024)
#	Employer	Number of employees	% Oswego population
1	Oswego School District 308	1,900	5.4%
2	Jewel-Osco	340	1.0%
3	Meijer	300	0.9%
4	Wal-Mart	280	0.8%
5	Radiac Abrasives	250	0.7%
6	Coldwell Banker Honig-Bell	225	0.6%
7	Target	150	0.4%
8	Home Depot	150	0.4%
9	Village of Oswego	150	0.4%
10	UPS	100	0.3%

== Transportation ==
Major highway transportation corridors are:

- US 30
- US 34 (Walter Payton Memorial Highway)
- IL 25 (Madison Street)
- IL 31
- IL 71
- IL 126
- CR 20 (Orchard Road)

The former Burlington Route line between Aurora and Streator runs through Oswego.

== Education ==
The Oswego Community Unit School District 308 serves Oswego, Boulder Hill, Montgomery, Plainfield, Aurora, Yorkville and Joliet. It operates 22 schools, including one early learning center, 14 elementary schools for grades K-5, 5 junior high schools for grades 6–8, 2 high schools, and one opportunity school. Portions of Oswego are within Yorkville Community Unit School District 115, which operates Yorkville High School.

== Notable people ==
- Rob Baxley, former professional football player
- Arthur M. Beaupre, diplomat; born in Oswego
- Tom Cross, former member of the Illinois House of Representatives
- Slade Cutter, former naval officer and member of the College Football Hall of Fame
- Emma Murdock Van Deventer, mystery novelist
- Rita B. Garman, former chief justice of the Supreme Court of Illinois
- Joey Goodspeed, former professional football player; running back for the Minnesota Vikings, St. Louis Rams, and San Diego Chargers
- John Hamilton, member of the John Dillinger gang who was buried near here in summer of 1934
- J. Dennis Hastert, former congressman and speaker of the United States House of Representatives (1999–2007), convicted child molester
- AJ Johnson, professional bowler on the PBA Tour
- Alex Magee, former professional football player; defensive end for the Kansas City Chiefs and Tampa Bay Buccaneers
- Colin Mickow, distance runner
- Robert Mitchler, Illinois state senator
- Robinson B. Murphy, Civil War Army musician; Medal of Honor recipient
- Maud N. Peffers, Illinois state representative
- Tom Sharpe, drummer for Mannheim Steamroller as well as Dennis DeYoung
- Julianne Sitch, former professional soccer player; first woman to ever win an NCAA championship as coach of a men's team
- Keith R. Wheeler, member of the Illinois General Assembly

== Awards and recognition ==
Oswego was ranked #58 in 2011 on CNN/Money Magazine's list of Top 100 Best Towns to live. CNN Money ranks these towns based on their job opportunities, schools, safety, economic strength, and other qualities. Kendall County has continuously been ranked as one of the fastest-growing counties and a place of rapid job growth.

== Gallery ==
Village hall

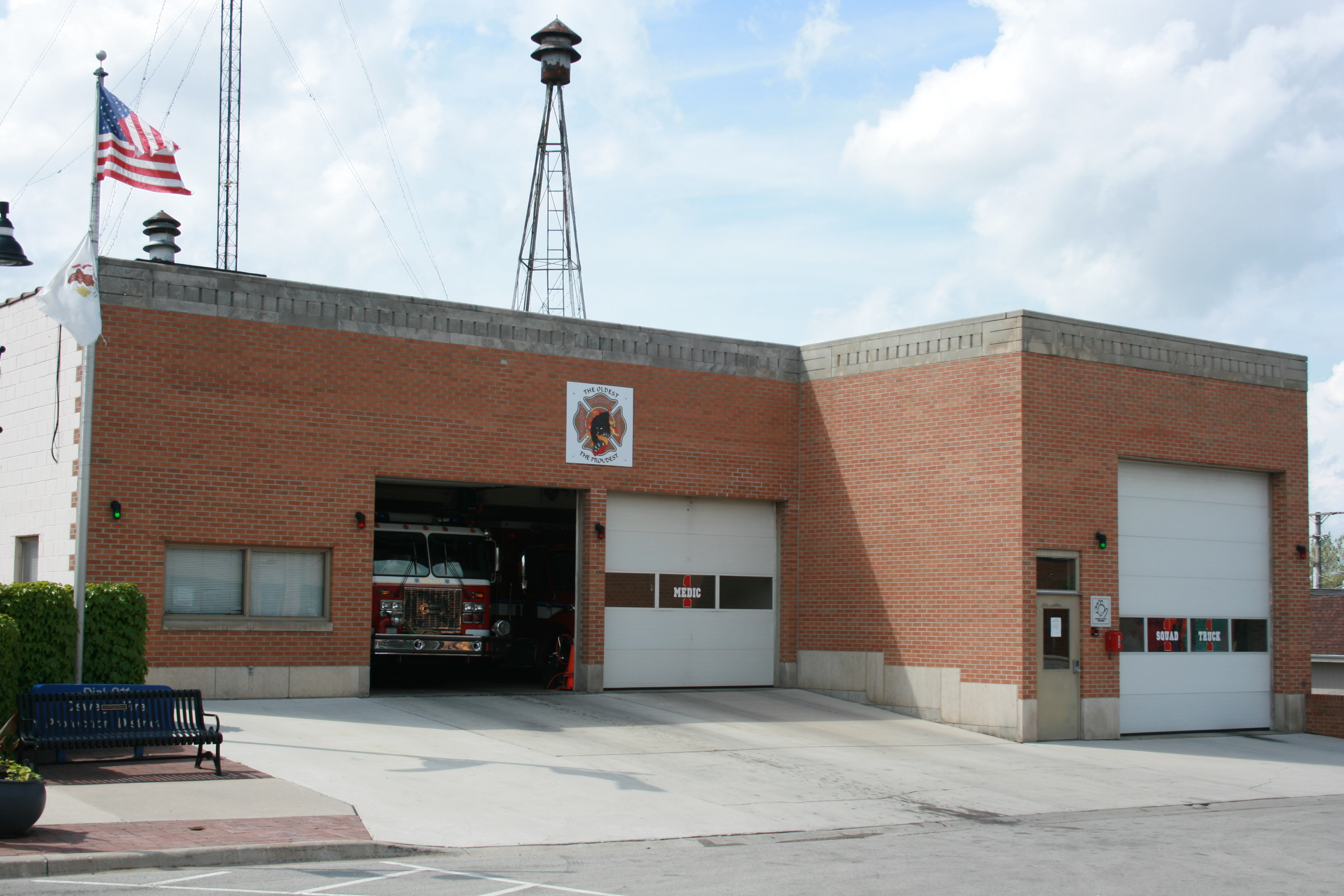
Old fire department

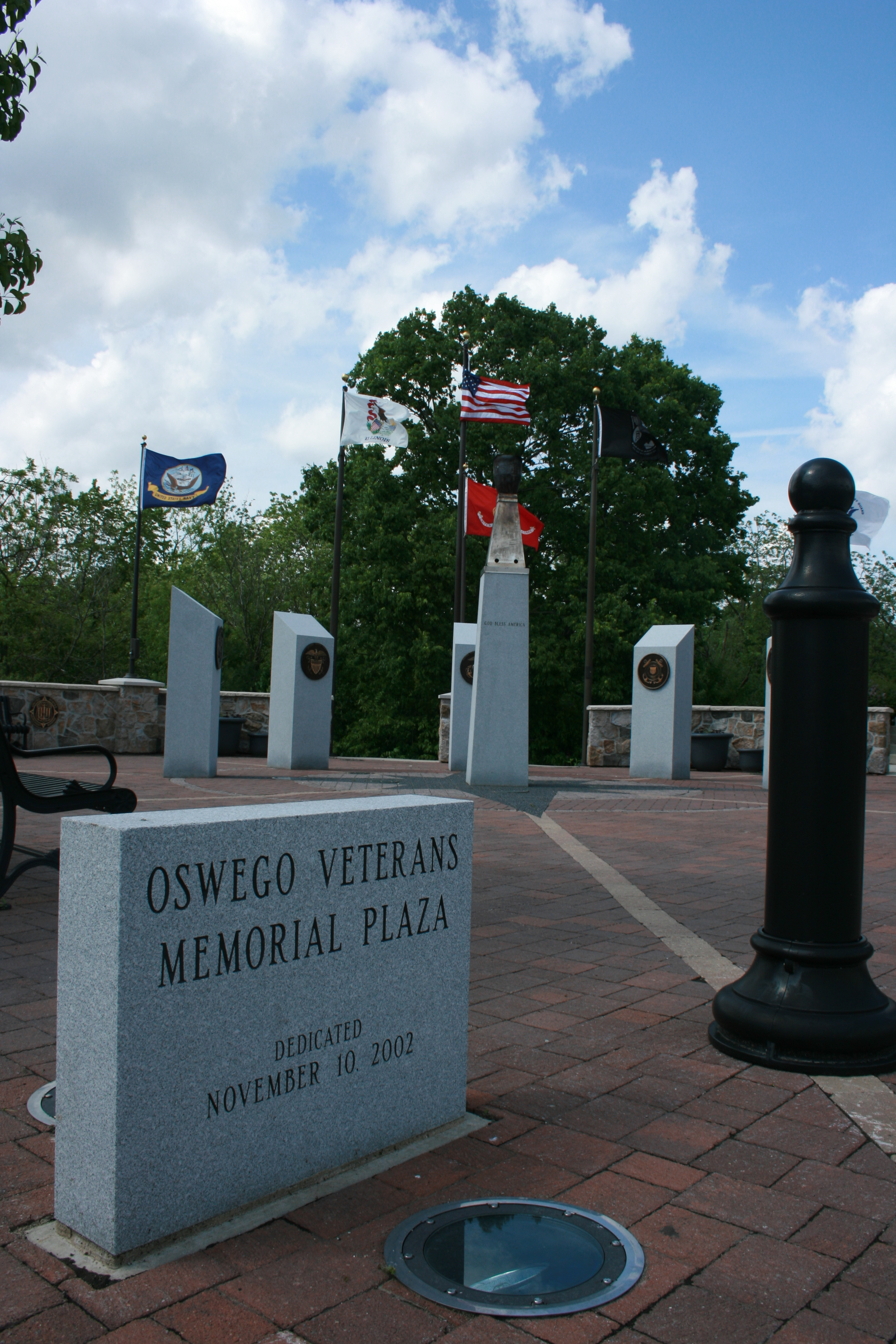
Veteran's Memorial Plaza

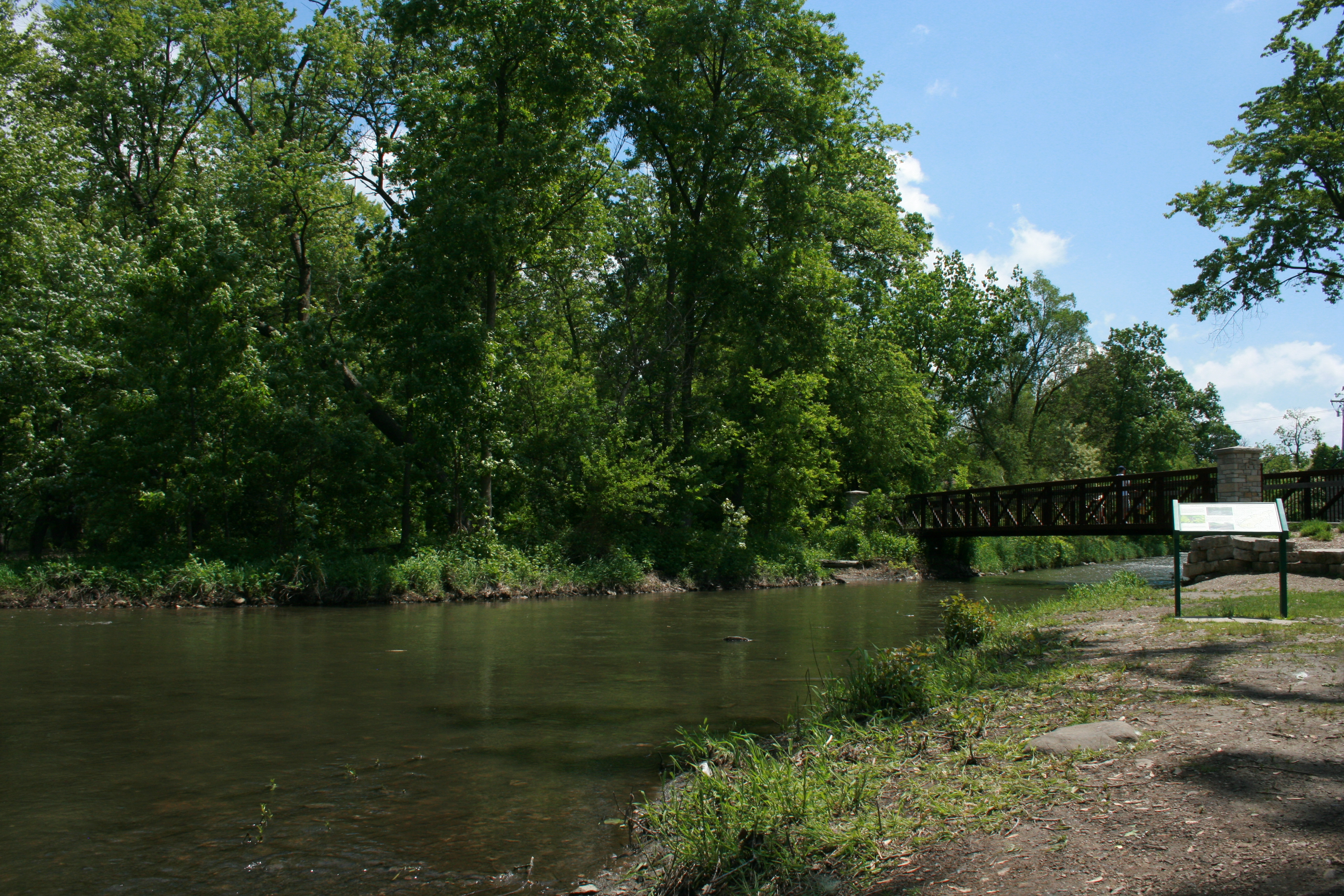
Hudson Crossing Park

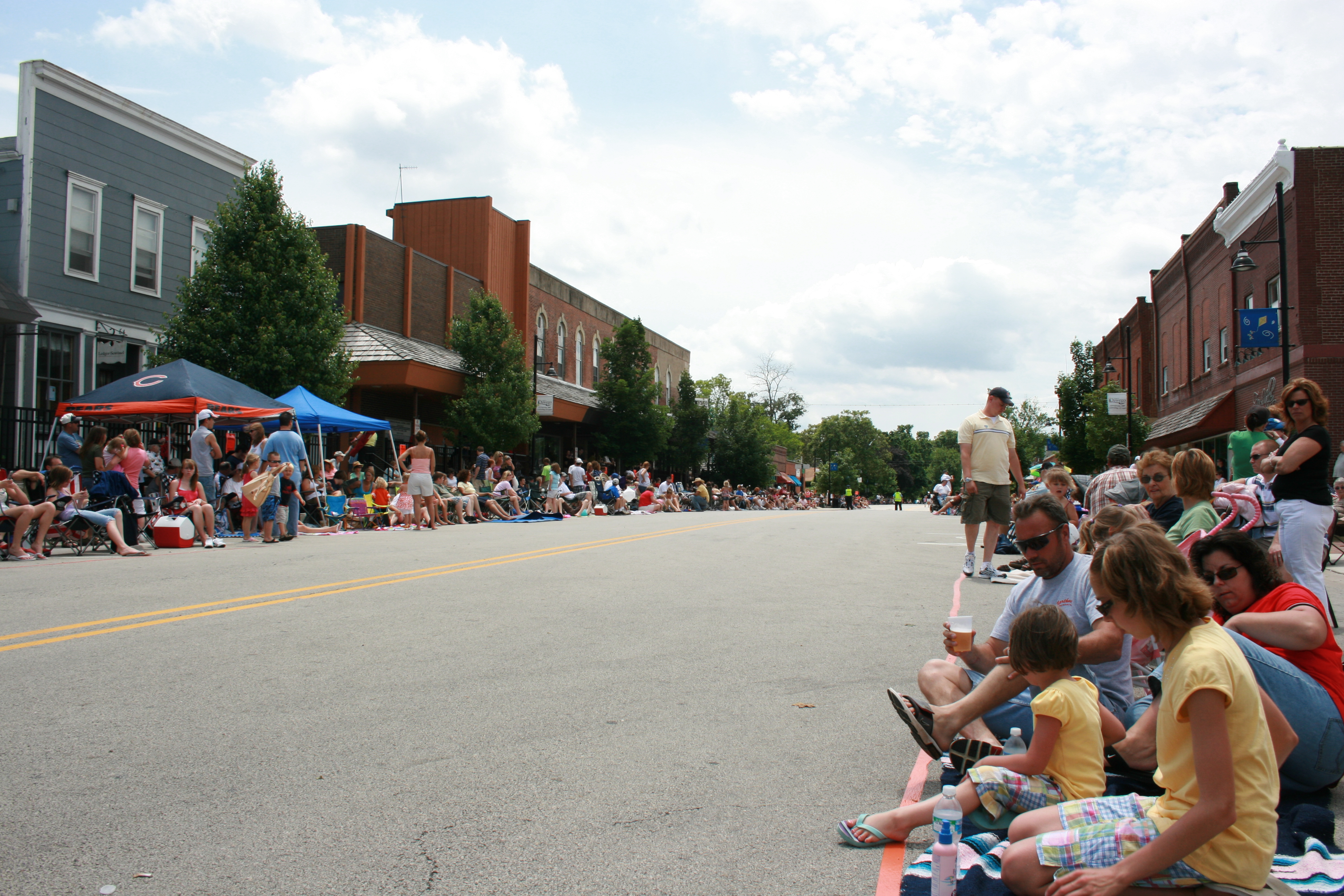
Downtown during PrairieFest parade
