= Fox River (Illinois River tributary) =

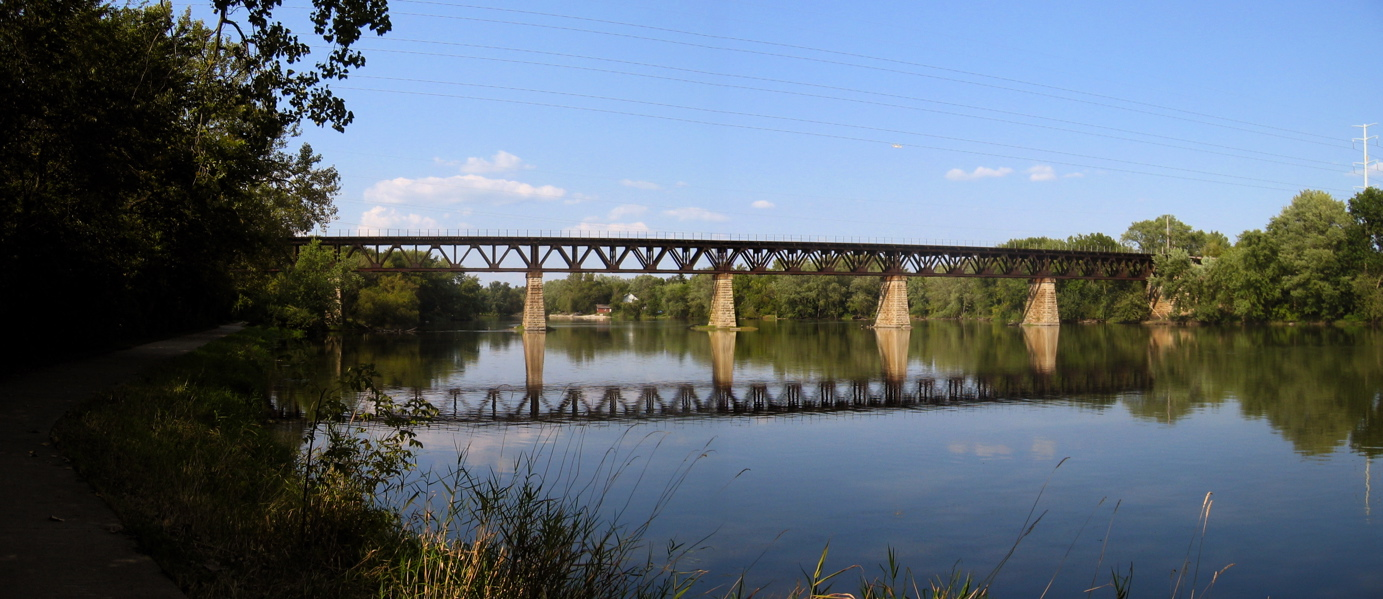
- The Fox River near South Elgin, Illinois

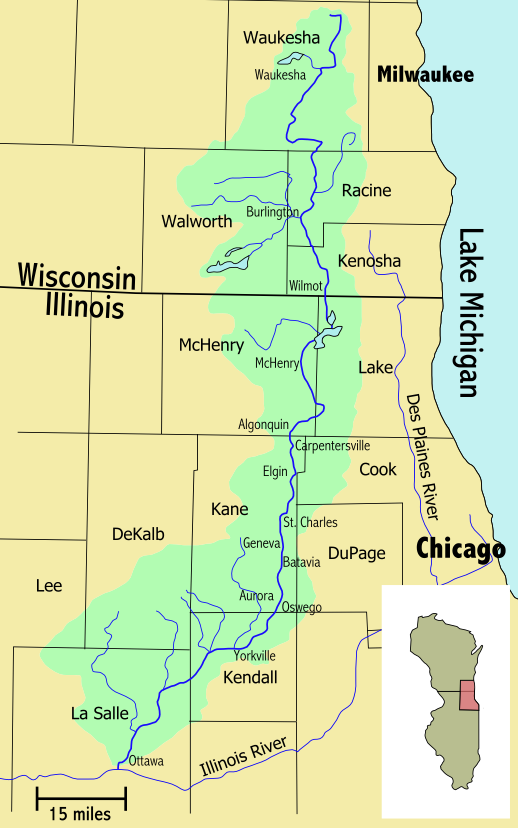
- Fox River and its watershed

Location
- Country: United States
- States: Wisconsin, Illinois

Physical characteristics
- Source
  - location: 1 mi (1.6 km) southeast of Colgate, Wisconsin
  - coordinates: 43°11′09″N 88°11′42″W
  - elevation: 942.78 ft (287.36 m)
- Mouth
  - location: Illinois River at Ottawa, Illinois
  - coordinates: 41°20′37″N 88°50′26″W
  - elevation: 460.28 ft (140.29 m)
- Length: 202 mi (325 km)
- Discharge
  - location: mouth
  - average: 2,346.01 cu ft/s (66.432 m^{3}/s) (estimate)

Basin features
- Progression: Fox River → Illinois → Mississippi → Gulf of Mexico
- River system: Mississippi River
- Tributaries
  - left: Poplar Creek, Morgan Creek
  - right: Nippersink Creek, Tyler Creek, Ferson Creek, Big Rock Creek, Indian Creek
- Waterbodies: Chain O'Lakes

The Fox River is a 202-mile-long (325 km) tributary of the Illinois River, flowing from southeastern Wisconsin to Ottawa, Illinois in the United States. The Wisconsin section was known as the Pishtaka River in the 19th century. There is another Fox River in Wisconsin that flows through Lake Winnebago into Green Bay. There are also two other "Fox Rivers" in southern Illinois: the Fox River (Little Wabash tributary) and a smaller "Fox River" that joins the Wabash River near New Harmony, Indiana.

The Fox River is known locally as an excellent fishery with opportunities for smallmouth bass, flathead catfish, and walleye. The river's watershed encompasses 1,720 square miles (4,500 km^{2}) in Illinois and 938 square miles (2,430 km^{2}) in Wisconsin. The area surrounding the river in Illinois is known as the Fox Valley, and around 1 million people live in this area.

== Wisconsin ==
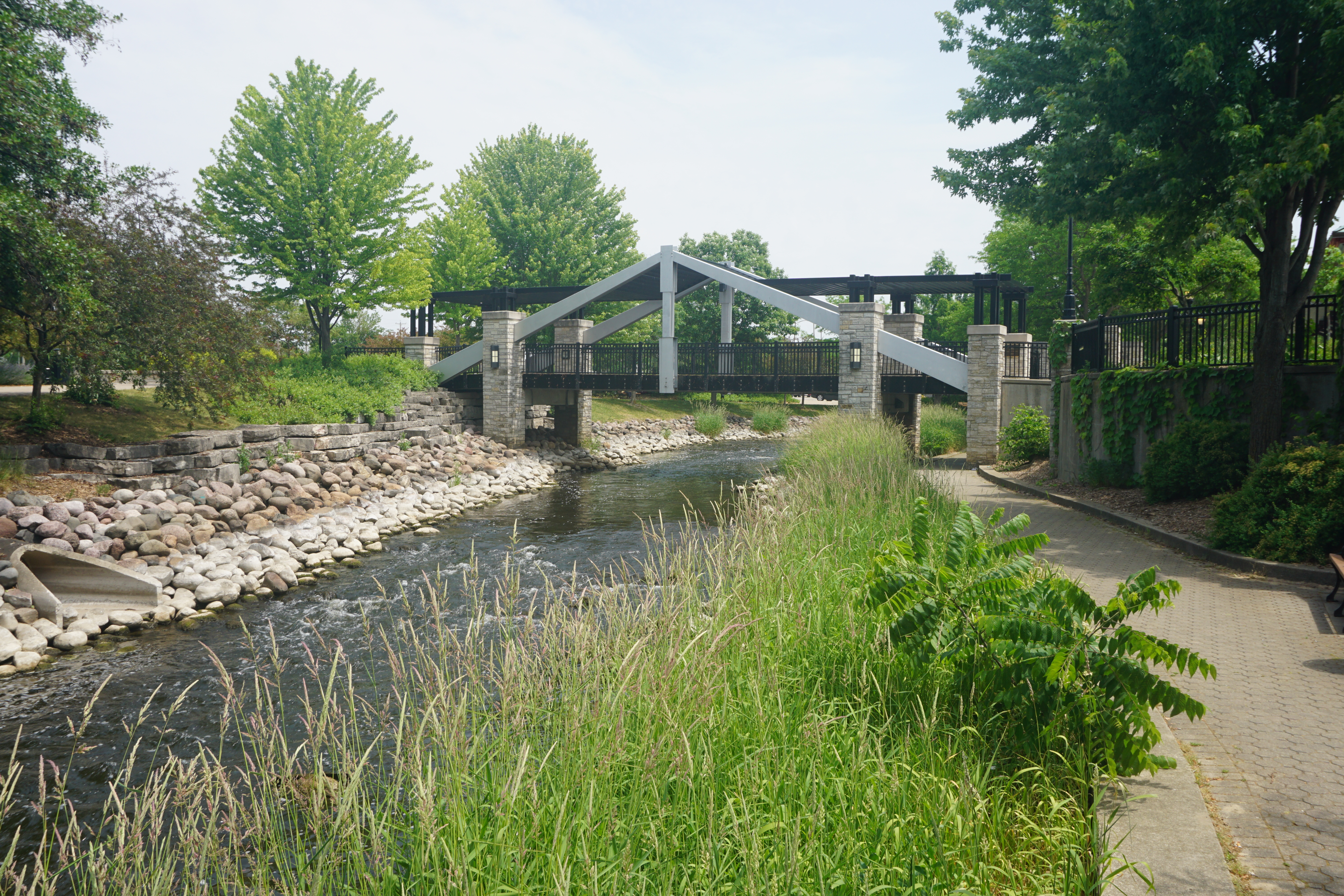
The Fox River and River Walk in downtown Waukesha, Wisconsin

The Fox River rises in the Halbach Swamp, 1 mi (1.6 km) southeast of the community of Colgate, Wisconsin and flows past Brookfield, Waukesha, Big Bend, Waterford, Rochester, Burlington, Wheatland, Silver Lake and Wilmot, for a total of 84 miles (135 km) in Wisconsin.

A major dam in Waterford forms a 1,200-acre (490 ha) navigable waterway which is one of the busiest in southeastern Wisconsin. The river is generally navigable from the Iron Bridge (now a concrete bridge) in Tichigan, Wisconsin (just south of Big Bend) down to the dam. The river connects several small lakes in this section, and one large lake, Tichigan Lake and one smaller lake, Buena Lake. The entire area including connected lakes and the Fox are often referred to as Tichigan Lake.

At the southern end of this section, Foxwood Isle separates the main dam to its west from a spillway to the east.

A small dam is located a few miles south, in downtown Rochester. The river then flows without obstruction through Burlington, where it meets the White River, and on to Wilmot. This stretch is used for day canoe trips. It stays close to the road, though often just out of sight of it.

Flooding is common on this section of the river, especially near Wheatland to the border.

The Fox River watershed encompasses 938 square miles (2,430 km^{2}) in Wisconsin.

== Illinois ==
The river enters Illinois where it widens into a large area of interconnected lakes known as the Chain O'Lakes. Fox Lake is the largest village in this area. From the chain, the river flows generally southward for 118 miles (190 km), until it joins the Illinois River at Ottawa. Illinois towns and communities that are on the Fox River include (from north to south): Fox Lake, Johnsburg, McHenry, Holiday Hills, Island Lake, Burtons Bridge, Port Barrington, Cary, Fox River Grove, Algonquin, Carpentersville, West Dundee, East Dundee, Elgin, South Elgin, St. Charles, Geneva, Batavia, North Aurora, Aurora, Montgomery, Oswego, Yorkville, Plano, Millington, Sheridan and Ottawa. Collectively, the area surrounding the Fox River is known as the Fox Valley. Around 1 million people live in this area.

Native American tribes that lived near the Fox River included the Potawatomi, Sauk and Meskwaki tribes.

The Fox River has 15 dams, including McHenry Dam, which raises the river slightly to maintain depth in the Chain O'Lakes in northern Illinois, the Montgomery Dam and the Dayton Dam, a hydroelectric dam near Ottawa. In September 2023, the United States Army Corps of Engineers issued a draft report recommending the removal of nine of these dams for environmental reasons.

In the winter, bald eagles can be found nesting along the banks.

Early in the history of Illinois, the Fox River provided water for the Illinois and Michigan Canal via a feeder canal, allowing the canal to pass over the Fox River on an aqueduct.

The Fox River watershed encompasses 1,720 square miles (4,500 km^{2}) in Illinois.

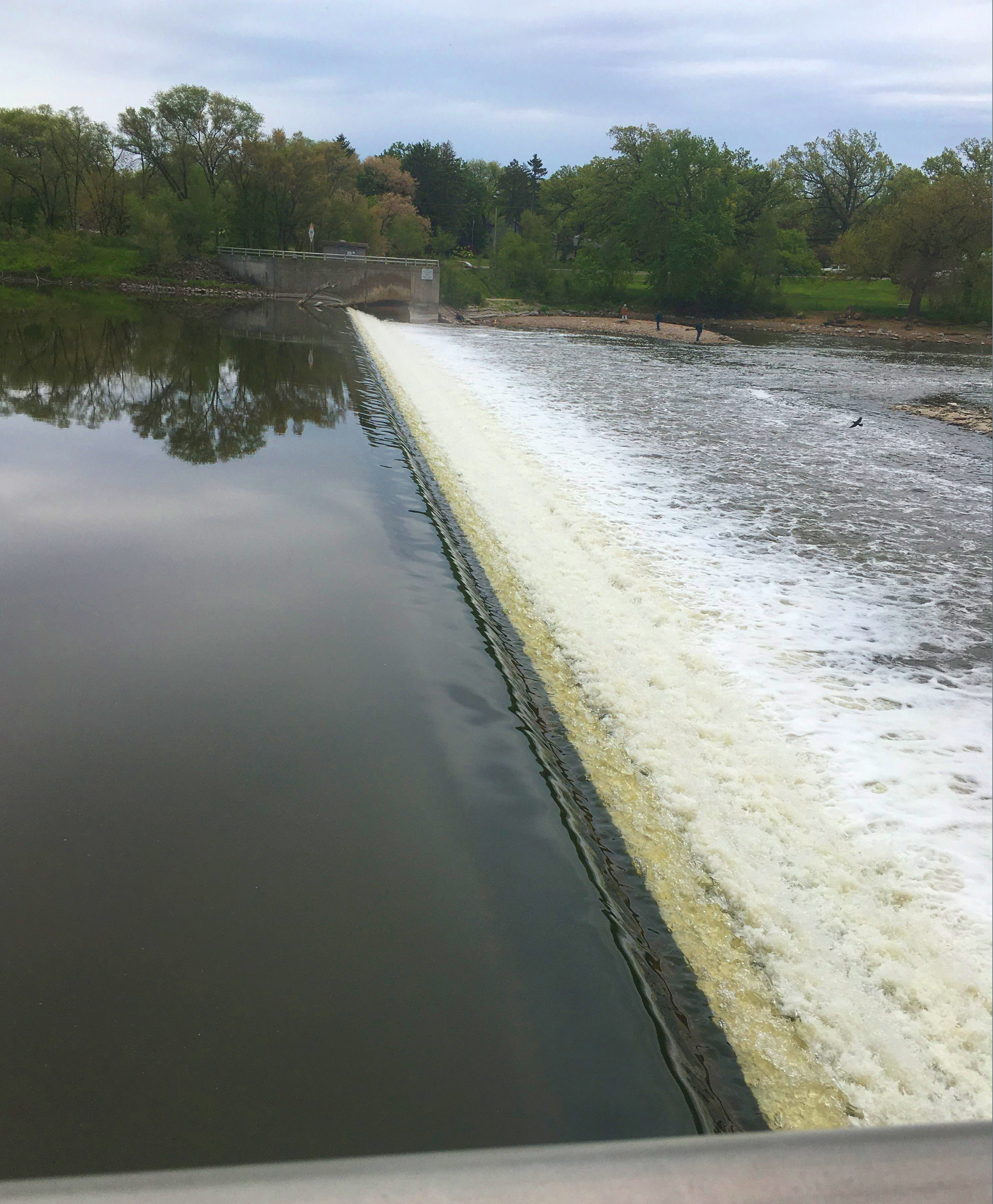
Fox river at Montgomery Dam in Montgomery, Illinois

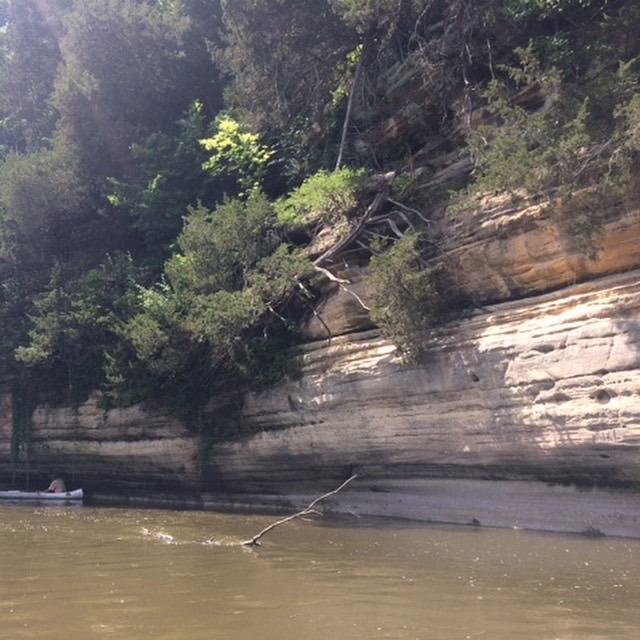
Fox river north of Wedron, Illinois

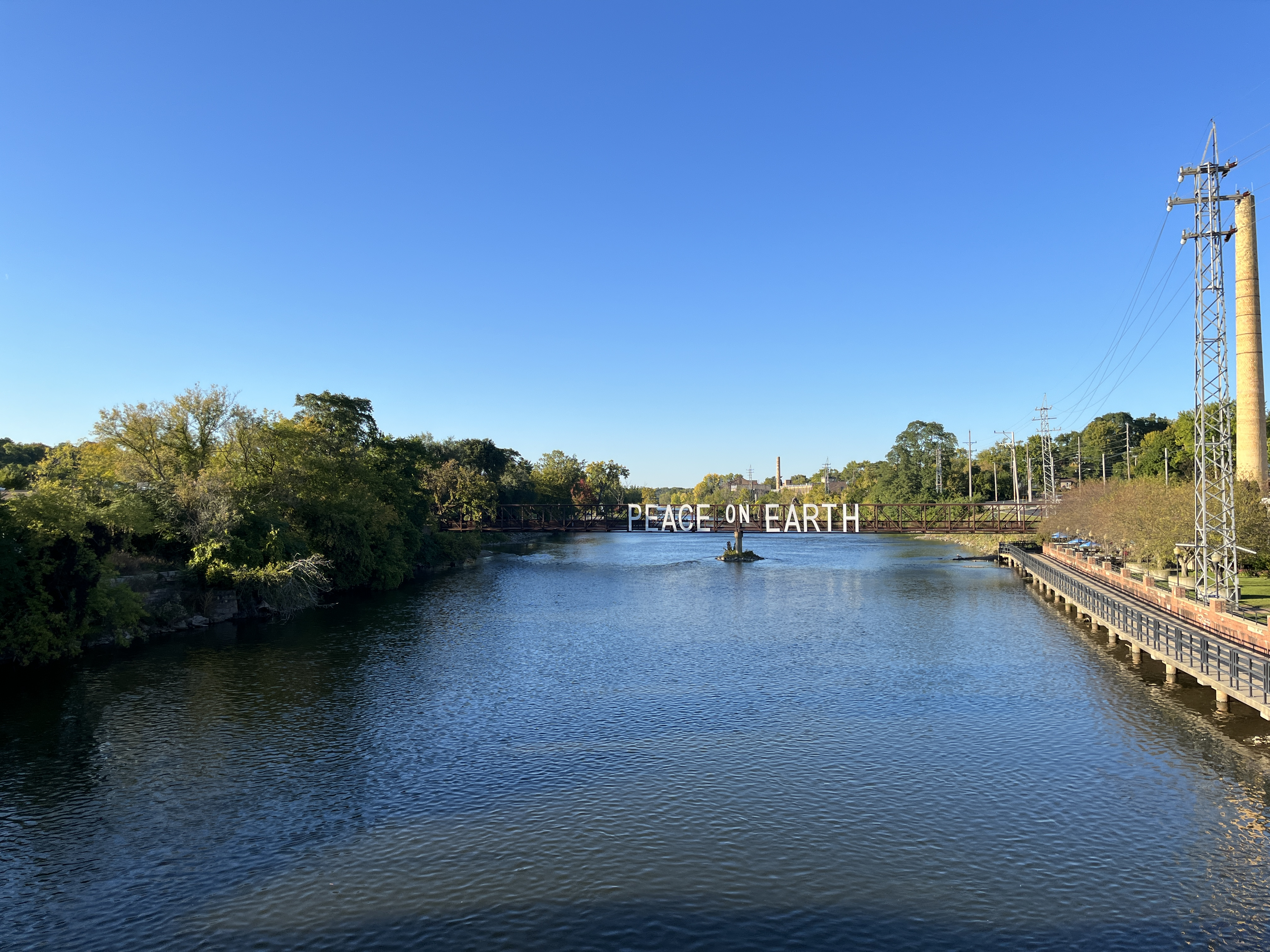
Fox River in Downtown Batavia, Illinois

== See also ==
- List of rivers of Illinois
- List of rivers of Wisconsin
- Fox River Trail (Illinois)
- Tri-Cities (Illinois)
- James F. Phillips
