= List of displayed Douglas A-4 Skyhawks =

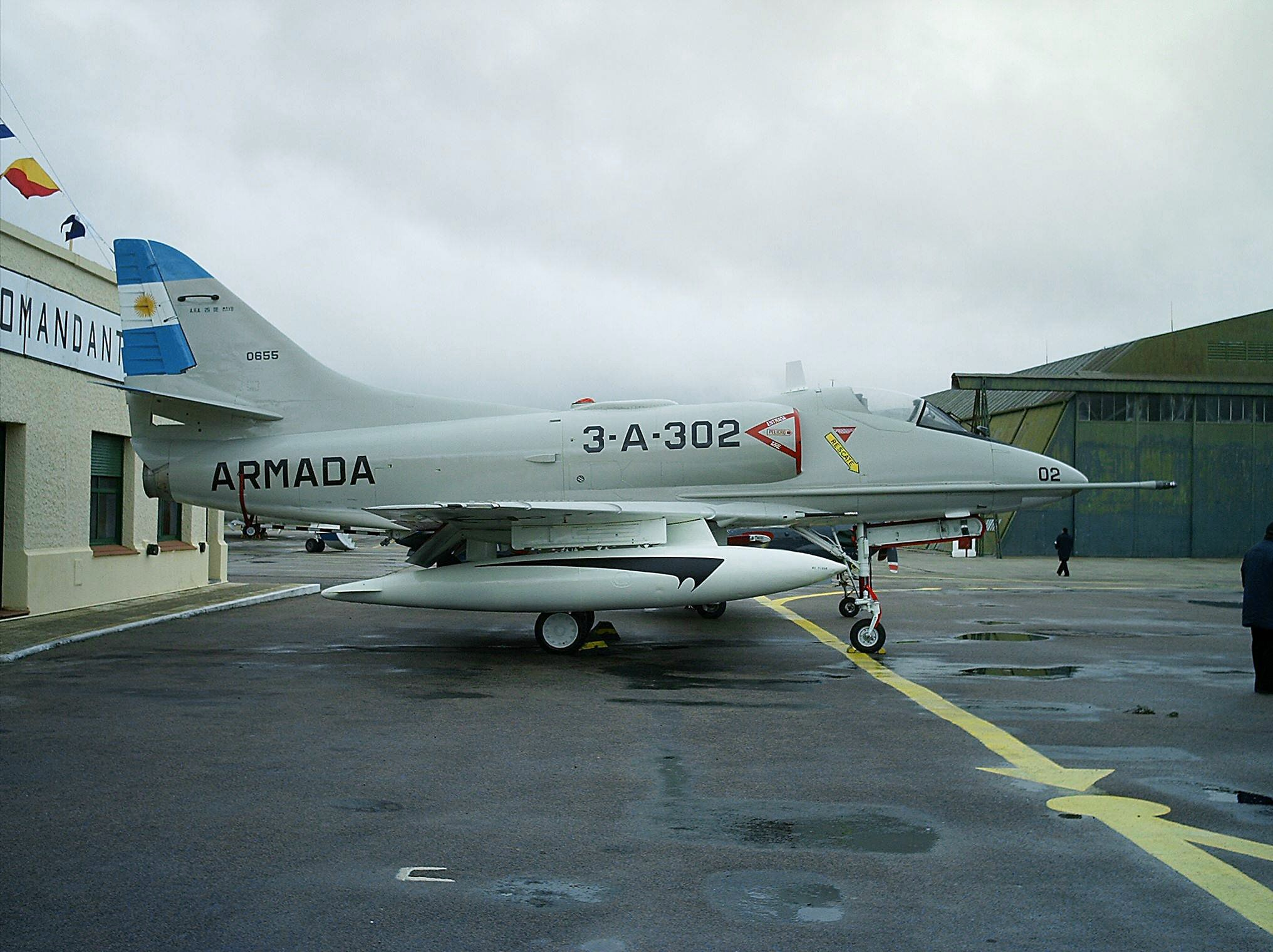
Argentine Navy A-4Q 0655/3-A-202, preserved at the Argentine Naval Aviation Museum, in 2007

The Douglas A-4 Skyhawk is an American single-engine carrier-capable lightweight attack aircraft designed for the United States Navy. Still in active service in a few countries, it has been retired by most operators. There are many examples of the Skyhawk preserved around the world, some airworthy and others on display, often in aviation museums and at facilities that once operated this aircraft.

== Aircraft on display ==
=== Argentina ===
A-4B (A-4P)

- 142688: National Aeronautics Museum, Moron, Argentina.
- 142748: Brigada Aerea, Villa Reynolds, Argentina.
- 142749: Regional Interforce Museum, San Luis, Argentina.
- 142752: Aerospace Technical Museum, Córdoba, Argentina.
- 142757: Brigada Aerea, Mendoza, Argentina.
- 142773: Rio Cuarto Material Area, Las Higueras Airport, Argentina.
- 142803: Córdoba, Argentina.
- 142855: National Aeronautics Museum, Buenos Aires, Argentina.
- 144988: Flying Club, Mar del Plata, Argentina.

A-4B (A-4Q)

- 144882: Espora Naval Aviation Museum, Buenos Aires, Argentina.
- 144915: Naval Headquarters, Buenos Aires, Argentina.

A-4C

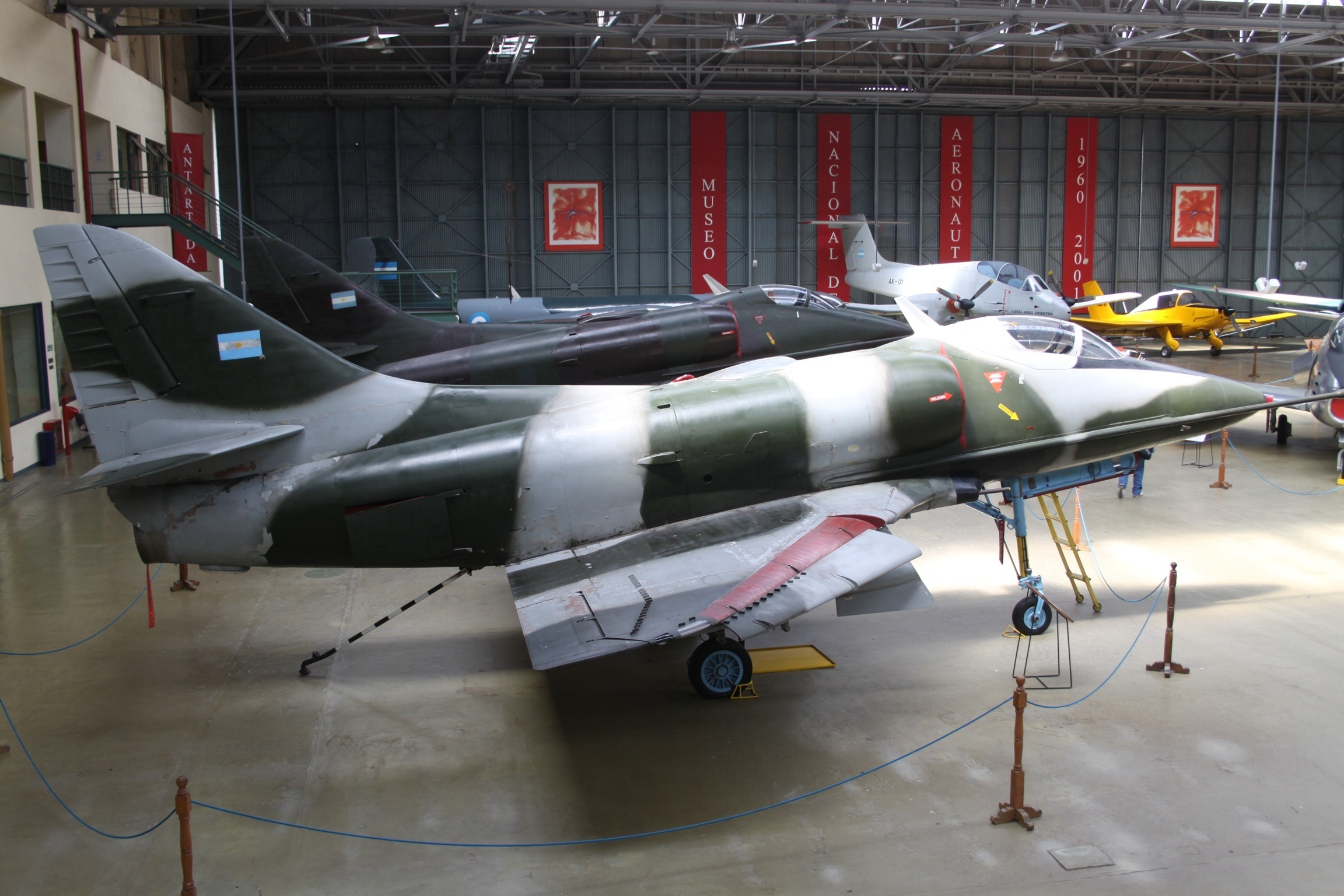
A-4C at National Aeronautics Museum, Argentina, 2008

- 148438: National Museum of Malvinas, Córdoba, Argentina.
- 149564: Brigada Aerea Museum, Mendoza, Argentina.
- 149514: National Aeronautics Museum, Buenos Aires, Argentina.

A-4F

- 154173: Aerospace Technical Museum, Córdoba, Argentina.

TA-4J

- 158477: Museo Santa Romana, San Luis, Argentina.

=== Australia ===
A-4B

- 142871: A-4B displayed as A-4G 154906 (885) and from 2007 as A-4G 154903 (882) Fleet Air Arm Museum (Australia), Nowra, New South Wales.

TA-4G

- 154911: displayed as TA-4G (880) Fleet Air Arm Museum (Australia), Nowra, New South Wales.

Brazil

- N/A: Brazilian Navy N-1006 on static display at the waterfront in São Pedro da Aldeia, Rio de Janeiro.
- c/n 14563: Brazilian Navy N-1010 (ex-KAF816) on static display at Centro Cultural da Marinha in Rio de Janeiro.
- N/A: Brazilian Navy N-1012 on static display at the Museu Oceanográfico da Univali in Balneário Piçarras, Santa Catarina.

=== France ===
A-4SU

- 147797 (928): on display at the French Aerospace Museum in Paris. (Note: Two of the retired A-4SU Super Skyhawks were donated to the French Air and Space Museum (Musée de l'Air) for static display. On 12 January 2006, a Certificate of Transfer and Acceptance signing ceremony took place between representatives of the RSAF and the French Aeronautics Museum at Cazaux Air Base in France.)
- 145071 (941): stored at the French Aerospace Museum. (Note: Since then, only 928 was put on display in the Rosette Hall of the museum while 941 was stored.)

=== Indonesia ===
A-4E

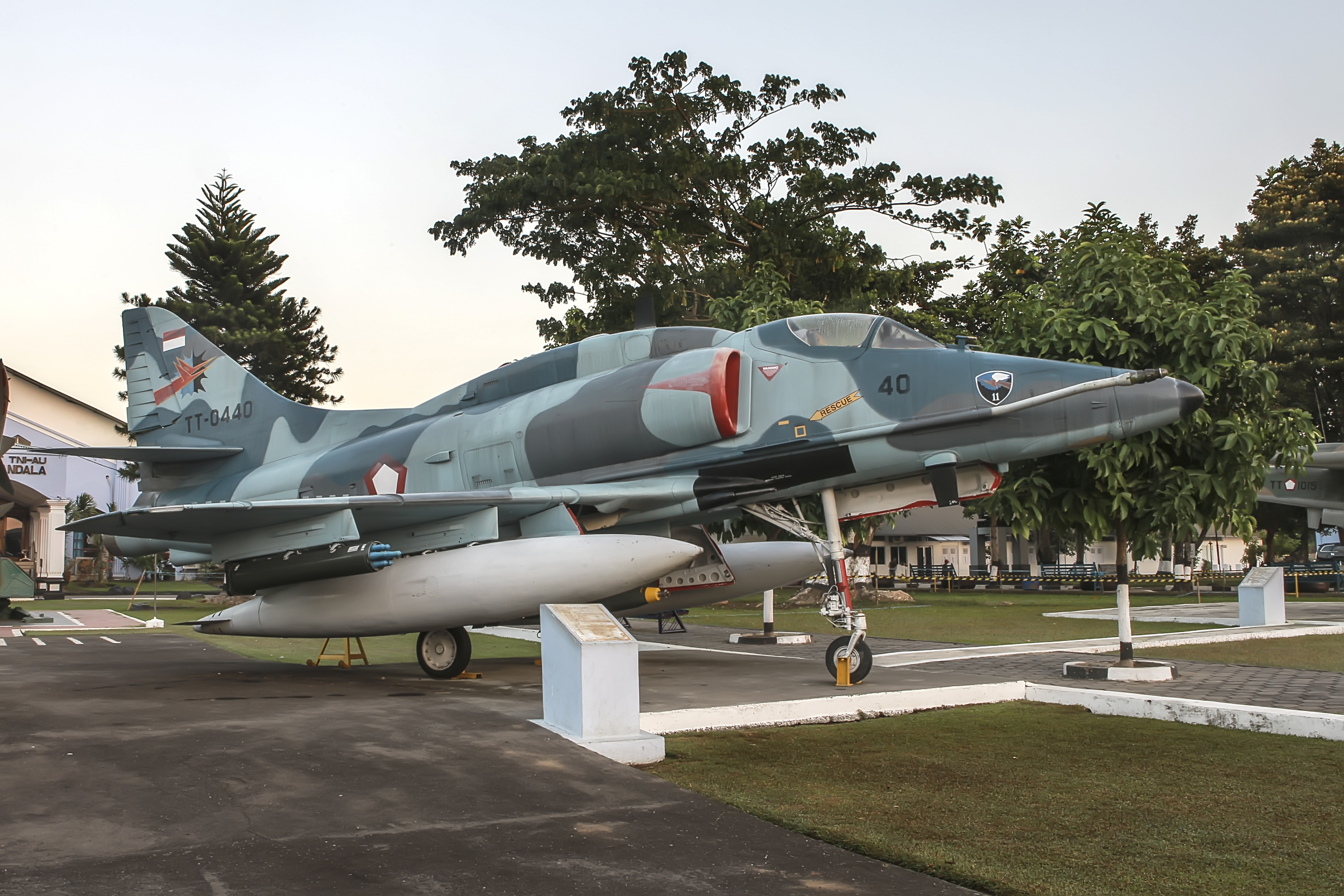
A-4 Skyhawk TT-0440 as collection of Dirgantara Mandala Museum

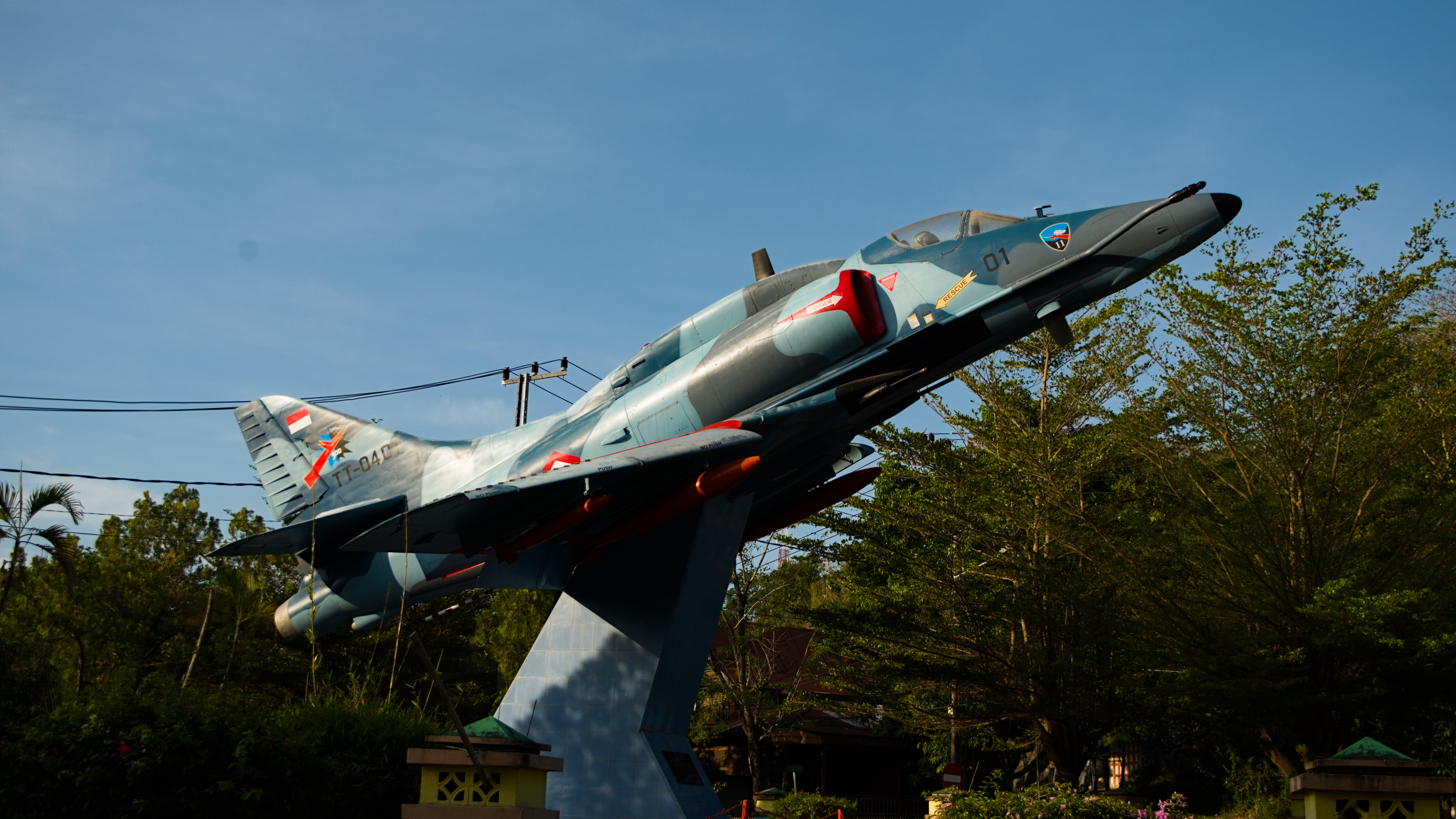
Indonesian Air Force A-4 Skyhawk TT-0401 monument in Sengkang, Wajo

- TT-0401: Sengkang town park, Wajo Regency, South Sulawesi
- TT-0402: 2nd Air Forces Operation of Command, Makassar, South Sulawesi
- TT-0403: Haluoleo Airport park, Kendari, South East Sulawesi
- TT-0408: Suryadarma Air Force Base Museum, Kalijati, Subang, West Java
- TT-0410: 2nd Air Force Operations of Command, Makassar, South Sulawesi
- TT-0431: Hospital of Indonesian Air Force, dr. Dody Sarjoto, Makassar, South Sulawesi
- TT-0431: Iswahyudi Air Force Base, Magetan, East Java
- TT-0432: Supadio International Airport, Kubu Raya Regency, West Kalimantan
- TT-0433: Roesmin Nurjadin Air Force Base, Pekanbaru, Riau
- TT-0435: Sultan Iskandar Muda Air Force Base, Aceh Besar Regency, Aceh
- TT-0436: Abdul Rachman Saleh Air Force Base, Malang, East Java
- TT-0437: Majalengka Dirgantara Park, Majalengka Regency, West Java
- TT-0438: Satria Mandala Museum, South Jakarta, Jakarta.
- TT-0440: Dirgantara Mandala Museum, Sleman Regency, Special Region of Yogyakarta
- TT-0441: Sultan Hasanuddin Air Force Base, Makassar, South Sulawesi
- TT-0442: Skadron Udara 11, Sultan Hasanuddin Air Force Base, Makassar, South Sulawesi
- TT-0444: Migas Cepu Edupark, Blora Regency, Central Java

TA-4H

- TL-0416: Indonesian Air Force Academy, Sleman Regency, Special Region of Yogyakarta

TA-4J

- TL-0418: Prince M. Bunyamin Air Force Base, Lampung. Formerly displayed at Tulang Bawang Regent office.
- TL-0419: Seno Park, Tebet, South Jakarta. Formerly displayed at Sultan Syarif Kasim II International Airport, Pekanbaru, Riau.

=== Israel ===
A-4E

- 149964: Israeli Air Force Museum, Hatzerim Airbase, Beersheba, Israel.
- 150092: Israeli Air Force Museum, Hatzerim Airbase, Beersheba, Israel.
- 151179: Israeli Air Force Museum, Hatzerim Airbase, Beersheba, Israel.
- 152050: Israeli Air Force Museum, Hatzerim Airbase, Beersheba, Israel.
- 152099: Israeli Air Force Museum, Hatzerim Airbase, Beersheba, Israel.

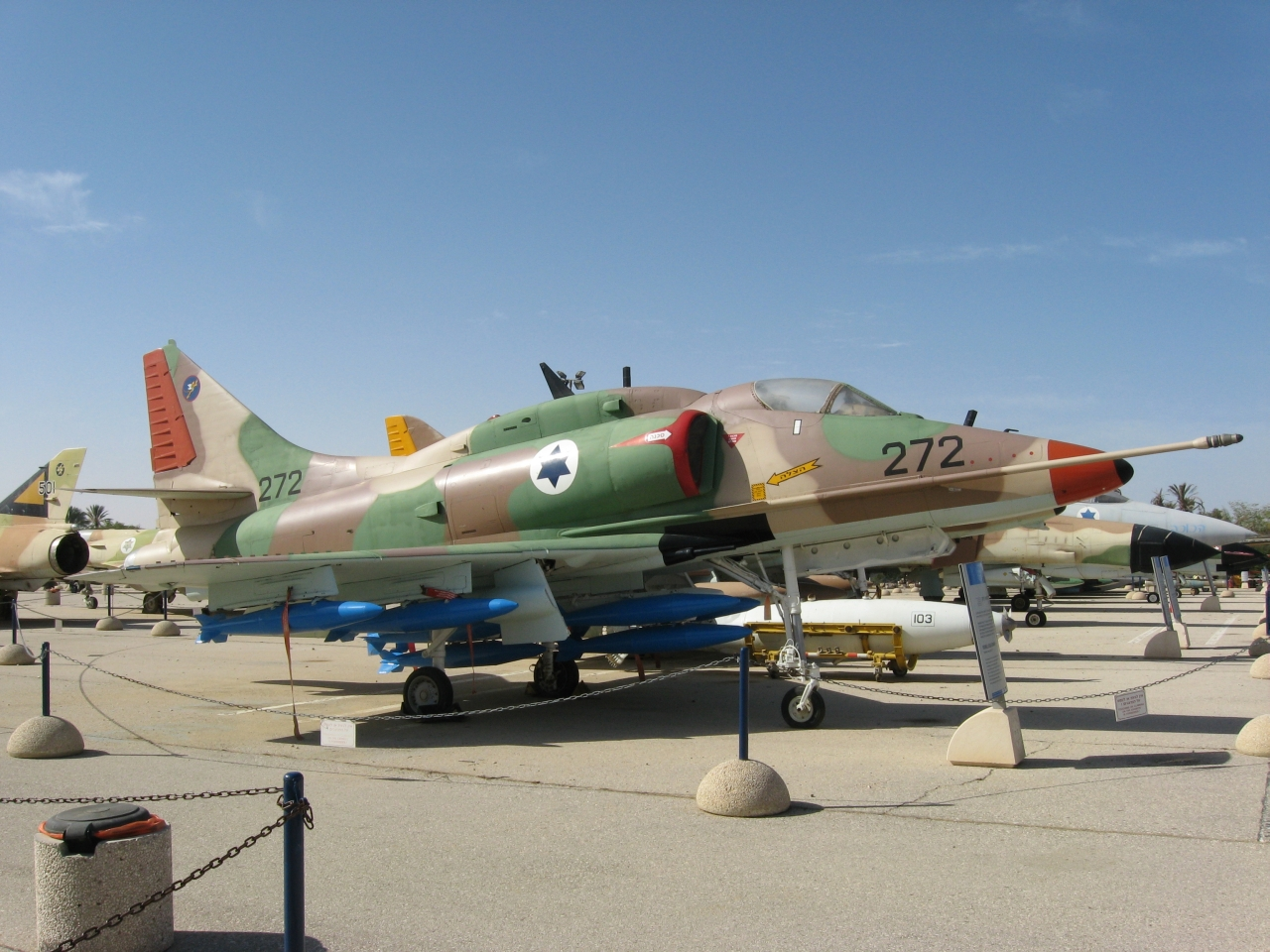
A4-H at Israeli Air Force Museum, Israel, 2010

A-4F

- 155010: Israeli Air Force Museum, Hatzerim Airbase, Beersheba, Israel.

A-4H

- 155254: Israeli Air Force Museum, Hatzerim Airbase, Beersheba, Israel.
- 155271: Israeli Air Force Museum, Hatzerim Airbase, Beersheba, Israel.
- 155287: Israeli Air Force Museum, Hatzerim Airbase, Beersheba, Israel.
- 155289: Israeli Air Force Museum, Hatzerim Airbase, Beersheba, Israel.

A-4N

- 159816: Israeli Air Force Museum, Hatzerim Airbase, Beersheba, Israel.

=== Japan ===
A-4E

- 151074: U.S. Naval Air Facility Atsugi, Atsugi, Japan.
- 151095: Clinic Syara (ex-Francisco D. Penie Memorial Clinic), Matsushige, Tokushima, Japan.

OA-4M

- 154638: U.S. Marine Corps Air Station Iwakuni, Iwakuni, Japan.

=== Kuwait ===
TA4-KU

- 160210: Kuwaiti Air Force Museum, Kuwait International Airport, Kuwait City, Kuwait.
- 160211: Kuwaiti Air Force Museum, Kuwait International Airport, Kuwait City, Kuwait.

=== New Zealand ===
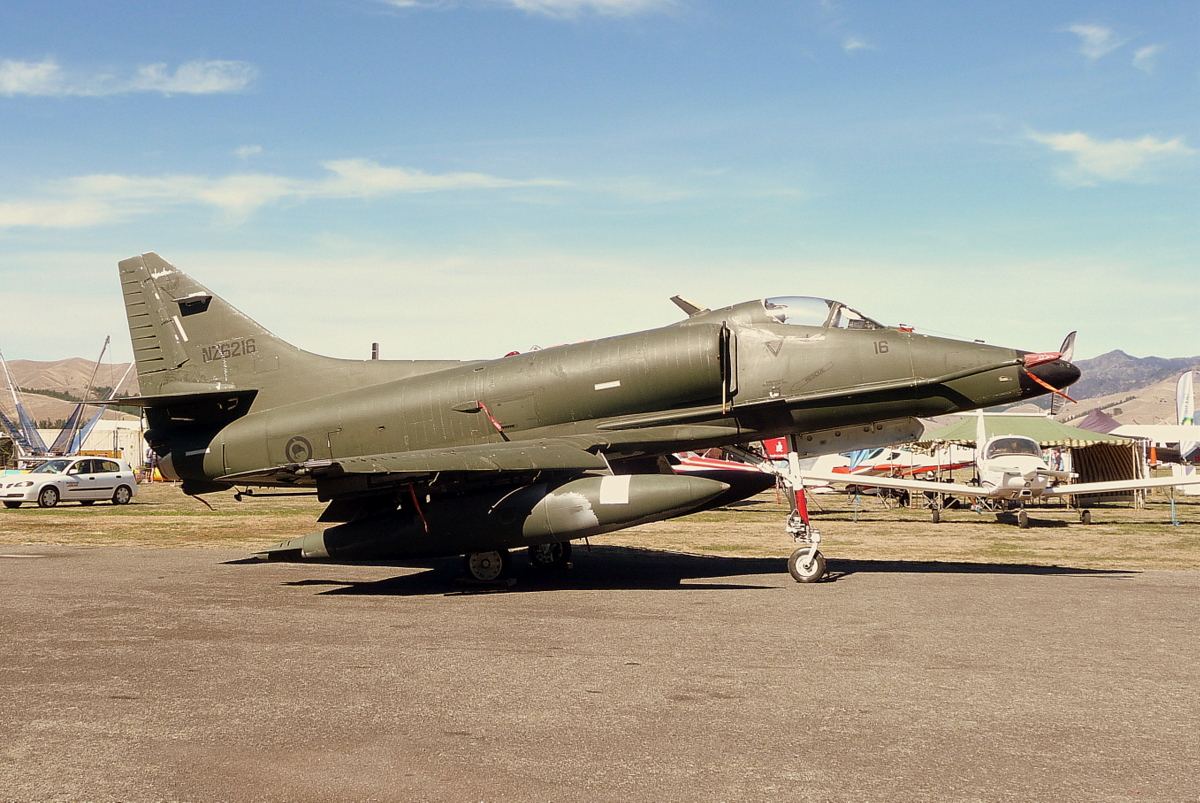
A-4K NZ6216 on static display at the 2015 Classic Fighters air show in Blenheim, New Zealand

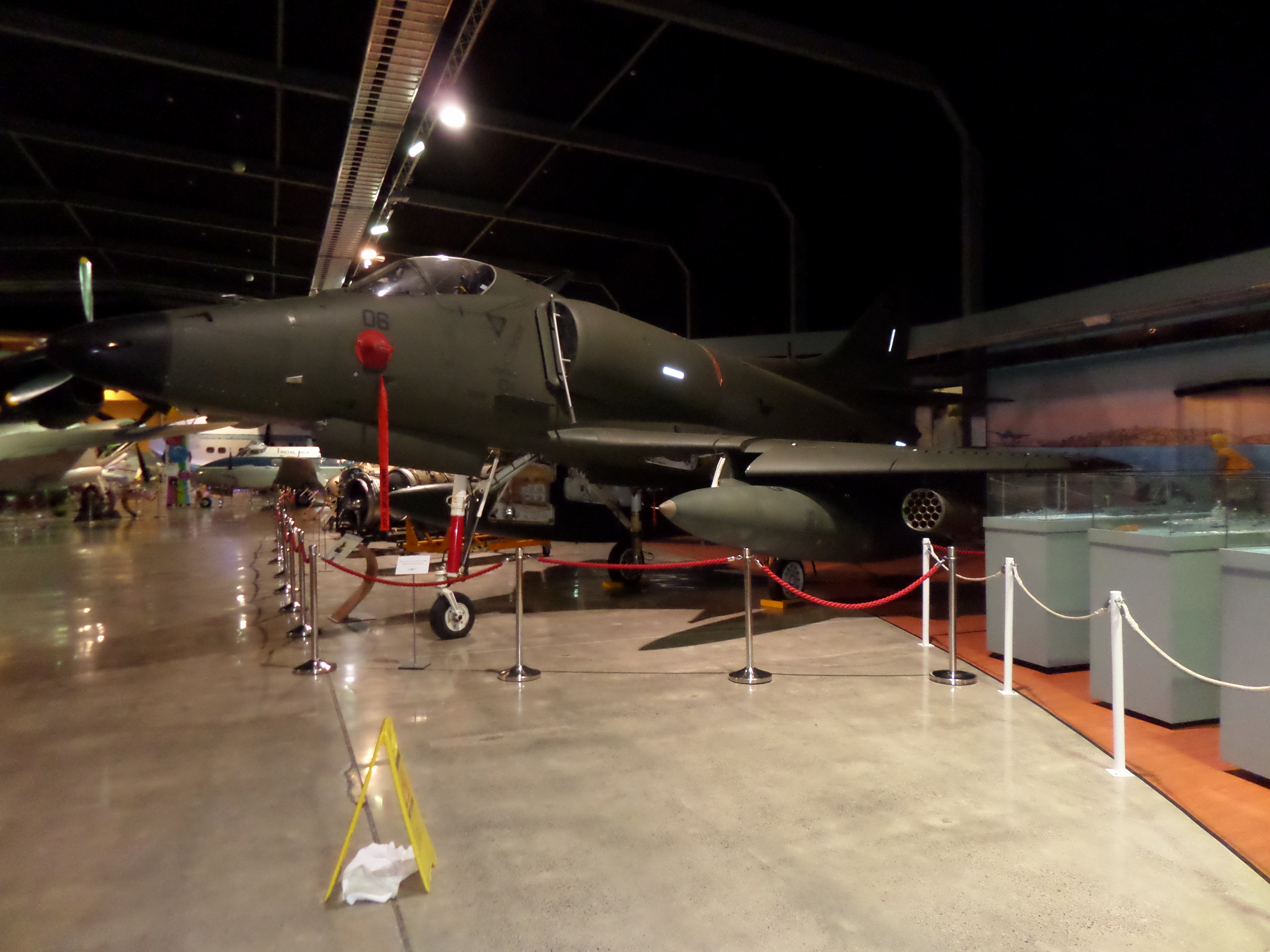
A-4 Skyhawk on static display at the Museum of Transport & Technology

A-4C

- 149516: ex-US Navy aircraft that had been upgraded to A-4L configuration and never served in Royal New Zealand Air Force (RNZAF); modified after its delivery to New Zealand to represent an RNZAF A-4K in early configuration; displayed with the spurious serial NZ6207 (the real NZ6207 crashed in 1974), Air Force Museum of New Zealand, Wigram Aerodrome, Christchurch, South Island.

A-4K

- NZ6201: Classic Flyers Museum, Tauranga Airport, Tauranga, North Island
- NZ6204: Ashburton Aviation Museum, Ashburton Aerodrome, Ashburton, South Island
- NZ6205: Air Force Museum of New Zealand
- NZ6206: Museum of Transport & Technology, Auckland, North Island
- NZ6209: New Zealand Warbirds Association Visitor Centre, Ardmore Aerodrome, Auckland
- NZ6216: Omaka Aviation Heritage Centre, Omaka Aerodrome, Blenheim, South Island

TA-4K

- NZ6254: Air Force Museum of New Zealand
- NZ6257: A non-flying static example constructed from parts. Currently displayed outside the Officers Mess at RNZAF Ohakea

=== Singapore ===
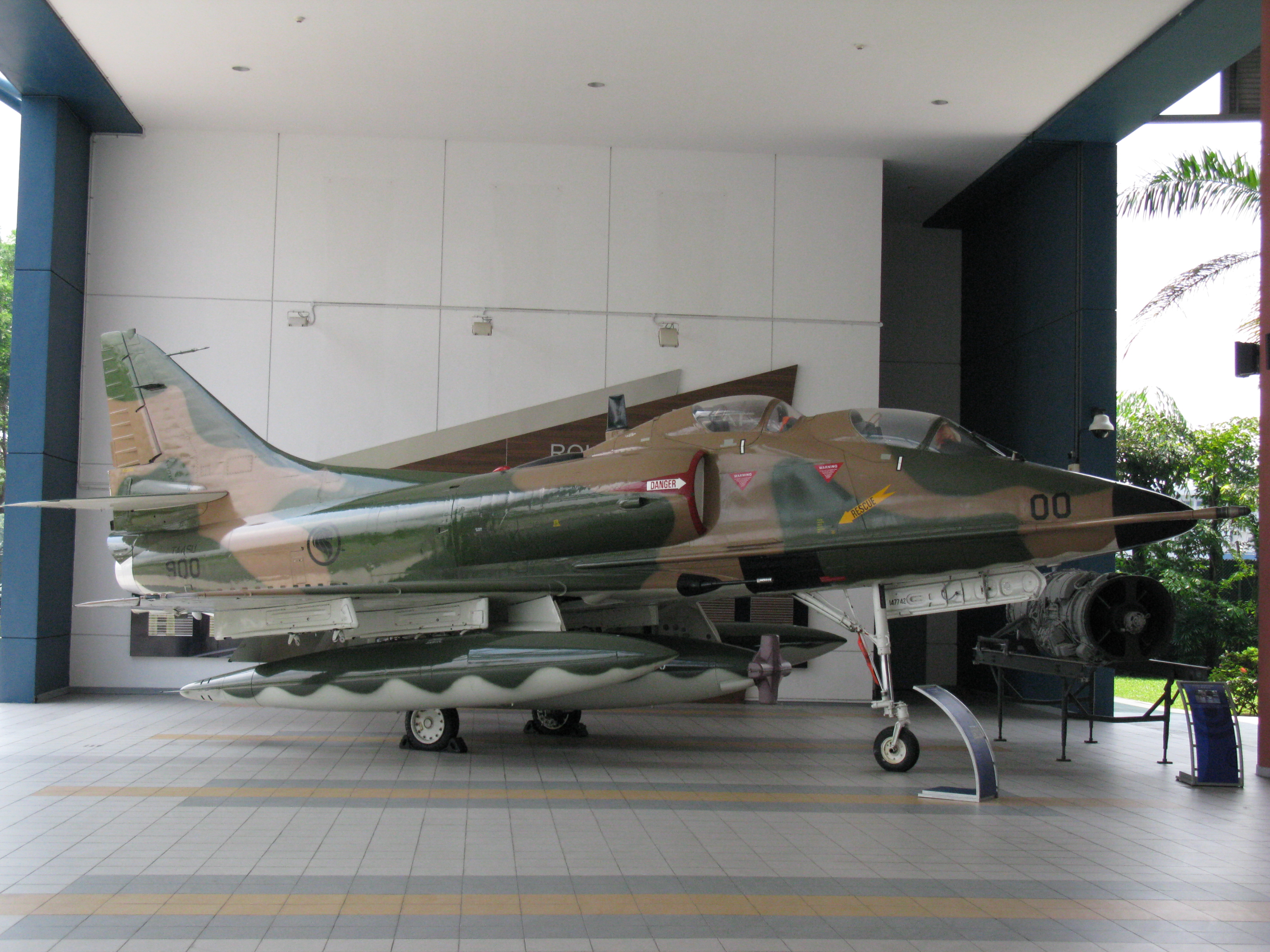
TA-4SU (900) BuNo 147742, with buddy refuelling pack attached under the centre-line pylon. RSAF Museum, Singapore, 2010

A-4S

- 142850 (600): Singapore Discovery Centre.
- 144979 (690): SAFTI Military Institute.
- 145013 (607): Republic of Singapore Air Force Museum.

TA-4S

- 145047 (651): Republic of Singapore Air Force Museum (forward fuselage section and cockpit).

A-4SU

- 145073 (929): gate guardian at Republic of Singapore Air Force Museum.

TA-4SU

- 147742 (900): Republic of Singapore Air Force Museum.

=== United States ===
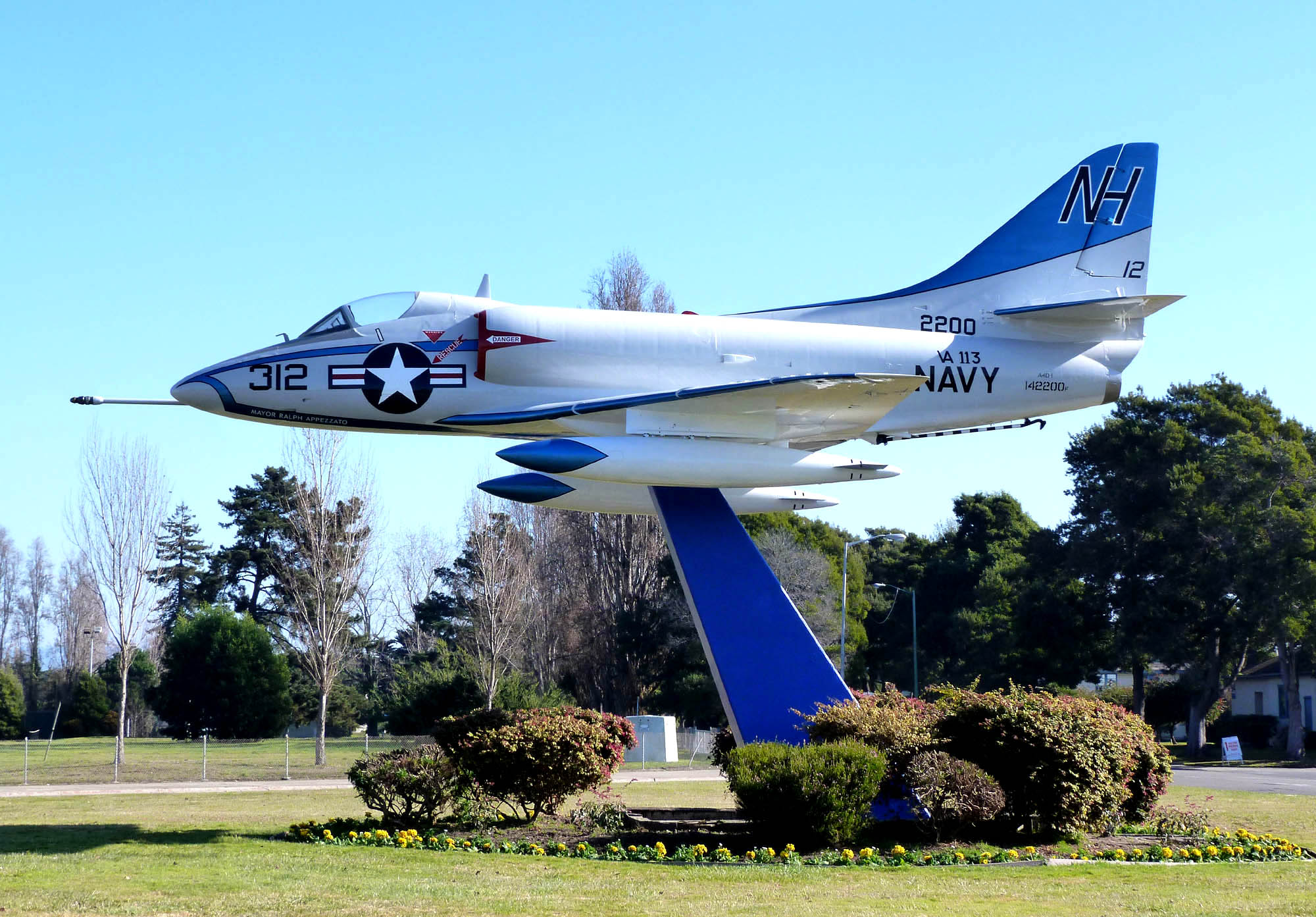
Restored A4D-1 at Alameda Point (former NAS Alameda), January 2012

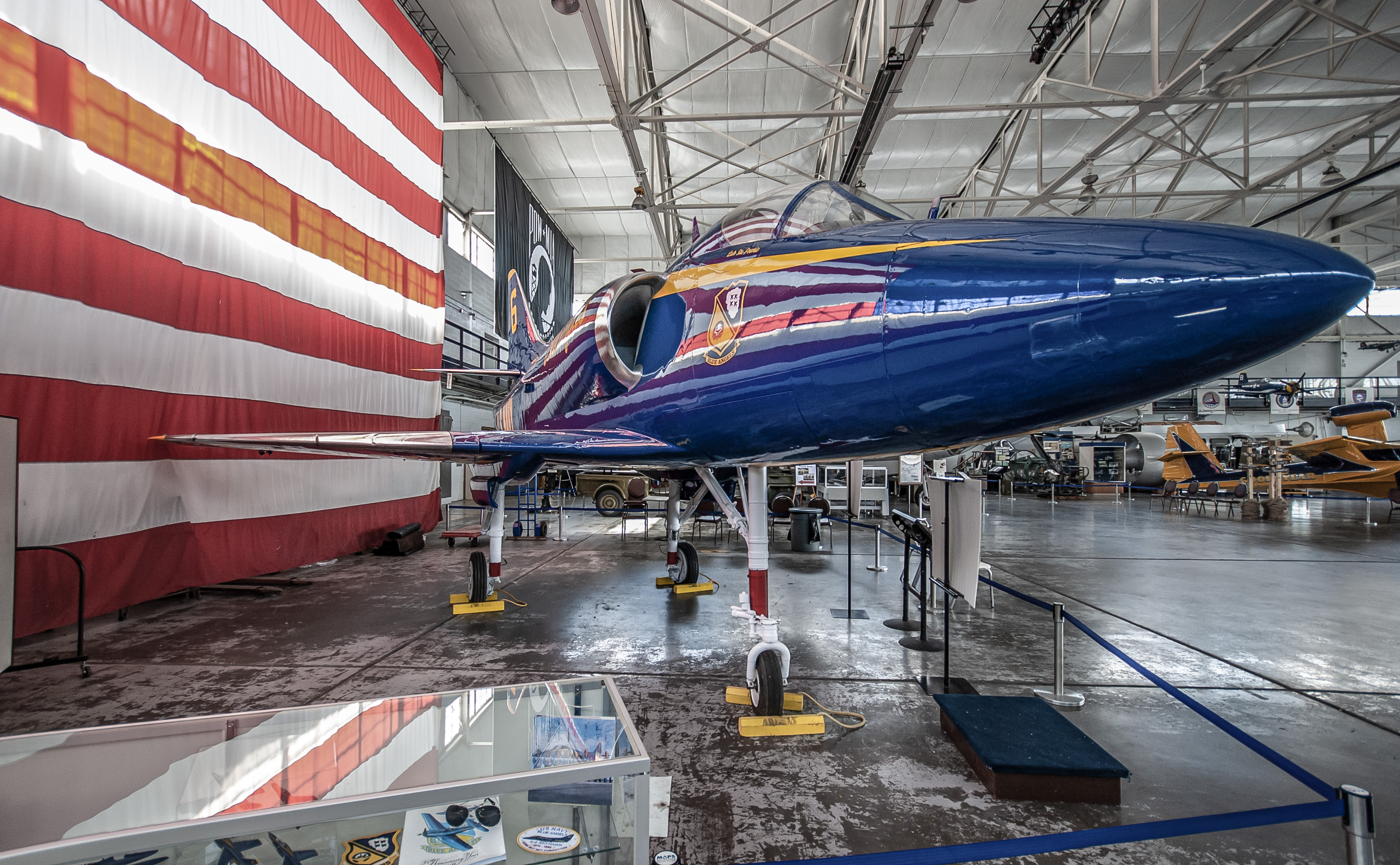
A Douglas A-4A Skyhawk (BuNo 139947) painted in Blue Angels livery at the MAPS Air Museum, North Canton, Ohio.

YA4D-1

- 137813: National Naval Aviation Museum, NAS Pensacola, Pensacola, Florida.
- 137814: Naval Museum of Armament & Technology, NCC China Lake (North), Ridgecrest, California.
- 137826: Estrella Warbirds Museum, Paso Robles, California.

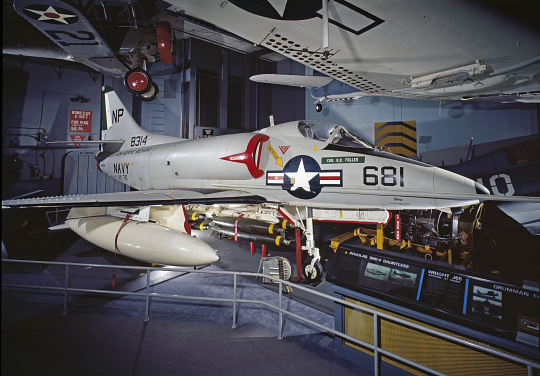
A-4C BuNo 148314. National Air and Space Museum, Washington, DC

A-4A

- 139929: USS Hornet Museum, Alameda, California.
- 139931: Gate guardian at Naval Air Warfare Center Training Systems Division, Orlando, Florida.
- 139947: MAPS Air Museum, North Canton, Ohio. Formerly on display at Octave Chanute Aerospace Museum at the former Chanute AFB, Rantoul, Illinois.
- 139953: Hickey Park, Lemoore, California.
- 139956 (displayed as 142176) : Aviation History & Technology Center, Dobbins ARB (formerly Atlanta NAS), Atlanta, Georgia.
- 139968: U.S. Naval Academy, Annapolis, Maryland.
- 142180: Naval Air Station Wildwood Aviation Museum, Cape May County Airport, New Jersey. It was retired due to damage, and the main wing, which originally had no folding mechanism, was cut off. The aircraft itself was painted with Blue Angels paint, but it was never actually used.
- 142200: Alameda Point, former NAS Alameda, Alameda, California.
- 142219: New England Air Museum, Windsor Locks, Connecticut.
- 142226: Carolinas Aviation Museum, Charlotte Douglas International Airport, Charlotte, North Carolina.
- 142227: Western Museum of Flight, Torrance, California.
- 142230: Naval Surface Warfare Center, Crane, Indiana.

A-4B

- 142094: NAS Lemoore, Lemoore, California.
- 142100: NAS Fallon, Fallon, Nevada.
- 142105: Veterans of Foreign Wars Post 8076, Hartwell, Georgia.
- 142106: Naval Air Engineering Station Lakehurst, Lakehurst, New Jersey.
- 142120: Weapons Survivability Lab, NCC China Lake (North), Ridgecrest, California.
- 142166: George T. Baker Aviation School, Miami, Florida.
- 142675: USS Lexington Museum of The Bay, Corpus Christi, Texas.
- 142678: City of Purdy, Purdy, Missouri.
- 142717: Court House Square, Beeville, Texas.
- 142741: National Vietnam War Museum, Orlando, Florida.
- 142761: Selfridge Military Air Museum and Air Park, Selfridge Air National Guard Base, Michigan.
- 142777: FAA Facility, Nashua, New Hampshire.
- 142829: HARP, Floyd Bennett Field (former NAS New York), Brooklyn, New York.
- 142833: Aboard former USS Intrepid (CVS-11), Intrepid Sea-Air-Space Museum, New York City.
- 142834: Ropkey Armor Museum, Crawfordsville, Indiana.
- 142848: Veterans Memorial Park, Ewing Township, New Jersey.
- 142879: in storage at Flying Leatherneck Aviation Museum at Marine Corps Air Station Miramar, California
- 142905: San Diego Aerospace Museum, San Diego.
- 142922: Tillamook Air Museum, Tillamook, Oregon.
- 142928: Pima Air & Space Museum adjacent to Davis-Monthan AFB, Tucson, Arizona.
- 142929: USS Lexington Museum, Corpus Christi, Texas.
- 142940: Shea Field Memorial Grove, former NAS South Weymouth, Weymouth, Massachusetts.
- 144906: Indiana Military Museum, Vincennes, Indiana.
- 144930: Proud Bird Restaurant, Aviation Blvd., Los Angeles, California.
- 145011: Air Zoo, Kalamazoo, Michigan.

A-4C

- 145067: Plant 42 Heritage Airpark, Air Force Plant 42, Palmdale, California.
- 145072: Air Victory Museum, Medford, New Jersey.
- 145082: Veterans Century of Sentries Park, Kenner, Louisiana.
- 145113: Dick Kleberg Park, Kingsville, Texas.
- 145122: Donnie Cochran Memorial, Savannah State University, Savannah, Georgia.
- 145135: Northland Community & Technical College, Thief River Falls, Minnesota.
- 147702: Pueblo Weisbrod Aircraft Museum, Pueblo, Colorado.
- 147708: Aviation Museum of Kentucky, Lexington, Kentucky.
- 147715: Fort Worth Aviation Museum, Meacham International Airport, Fort Worth, Texas.
- 147727: Porterville Municipal Airport, Porterville, California.
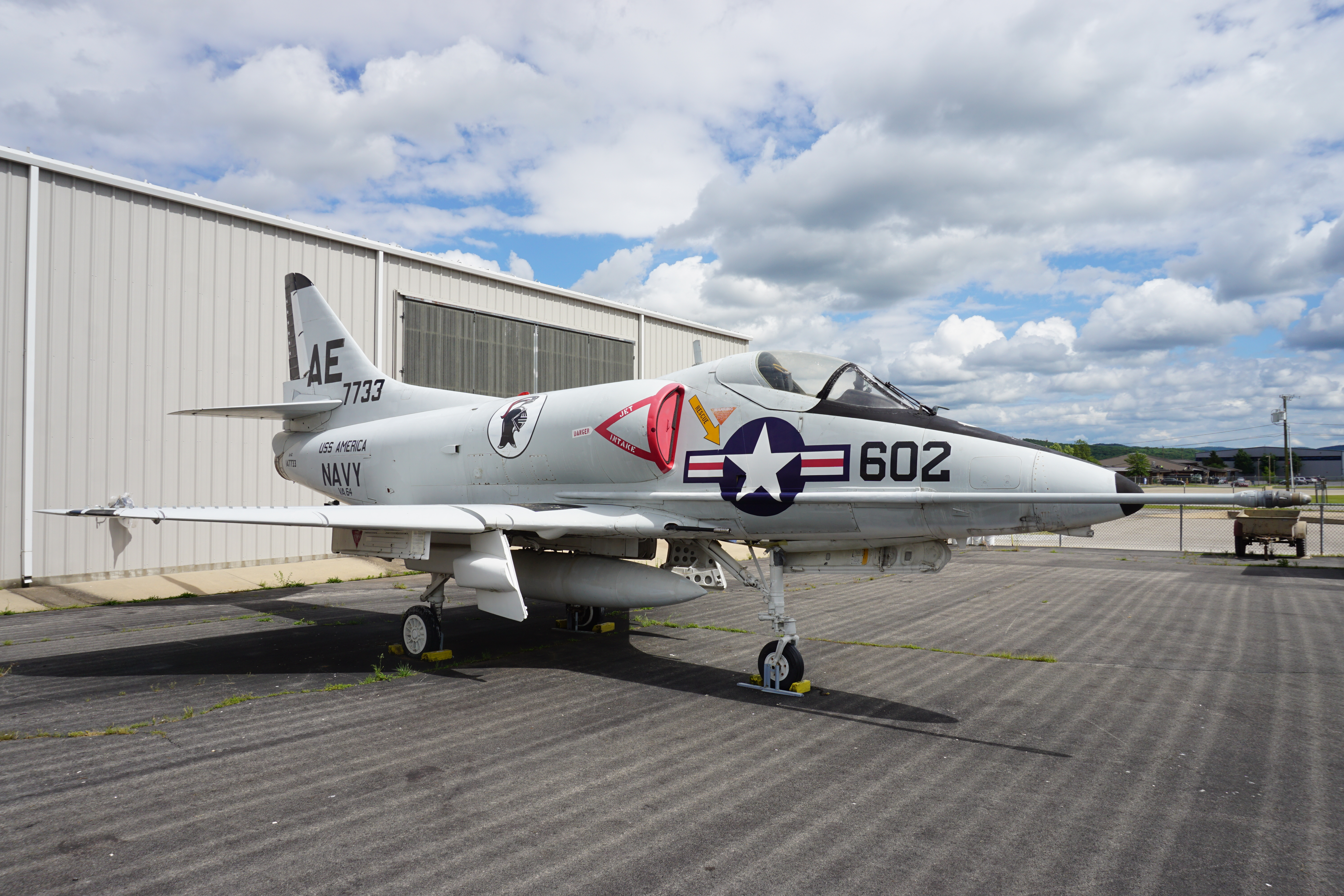
  Douglas A-4 Skyhawk at the Arkansas Air & Military Museum in Fayetteville, Arkansas
- 147733: Arkansas Air & Military Museum, Fayetteville, Arkansas.
- 147767: Inde Motorsports Ranch, Willcox, Arizona.
- 147787: Battleship Memorial Park, Mobile, Alabama.
- 147788: NAS Jacksonville Air Park, Naval Air Station Jacksonville, Florida.
- 147790: stored at Quonset Air Museum, Quonset State Airport (former NAS Quonset Point), North Kingstown, Rhode Island.
- 147825: Santa Maria Museum of Flight, Santa Maria, California.
- 148314: National Air and Space Museum, Washington, D.C.
- 148316: Planes of Fame Museum, Chino, California.
- 148485: Wall of Honor Veterans Memorial, Bartlesville, Oklahoma.
- 148490: I-10 rest stop, Santa Rosa County, Florida.
- 148491: Oregon Air & Space Museum, Eugene, Oregon.
- 148492: Flying Leatherneck Historical Foundation and Aviation Museum, Marine Corps Air Station Miramar, California.
- 148500: Illinois Aviation Museum, Bolingbrook, Illinois.
- 148503: Aerospace Museum of California, Sacramento, California.
- 148516: Naval Air Station North Island, San Diego, California.
- 148538: Hickory Aviation Museum, North Carolina.
- 148543: Yankee Air Museum, Belleville, Michigan
- 148569: Louisiana Military Museum, Ruston, Louisiana.
- 148571: Pima Air & Space Museum, adjacent to Davis-Monthan AFB, Tucson, Arizona.
- 148572: Cumberland High School, Crossville, Tennessee.
- 148610: Encinal High School, Alameda, California.
- 149508: Patriot Park, Covington, Tennessee.
- 149532: Castle Air Museum, former Castle AFB, Atwater, California.
- 149547: stored at Planes of Fame in Chino, California.
- 149563: Pensacola Regional Airport, Pensacola, Florida.
- 149618: Though the aircraft's actual identity is unconfirmed, an aircraft marked as 149618 is displayed at Freedom Park in Omaha, Nebraska.
- 149623: Patriots Point Naval & Maritime Museum, Charleston, South Carolina.
- 149636: Yanks Air Museum, Chino, California.
- 150586: Air Park, Marine Corps Air Station Yuma, Yuma, Arizona.
- 150598: New Century Air Center (former NAS Olathe), Olathe, Kansas.

A-4E

- 149656: National Naval Aviation Museum, Naval Air Station Pensacola, Pensacola, Florida.
- 149977: Veterans of Foreign Wars (VFW) Post 1419, Hamburg, New York.
- 150023: Naval Air Museum Barbers Point (former NAS Barbers Point), Kapolei, Hawaii.
- 150058: Nauticus National Maritime Center, Norfolk, Virginia.
- 150076 (marked as Blue Angel #1 154180): National Naval Aviation Museum, NAS Pensacola, Pensacola, Florida.
- 151030: Naval Air Museum Barbers Point (former NAS Barbers Point), Kapolei, Hawaii.
- 151033: Naval Air Station Key West, Key West, Florida.
- 151036: Veterans Center, Lihue, Hawaii.
- 151038: Yanks Air Museum, Chino, California.
- 151064: stored at Planes of Fame in Chino, California.
- 151186: Naval Air Station Oceana Air Park, Virginia Beach, Virginia.
- 151194: Pacific Coast Air Museum, Santa Rosa, California.
- 152012:Albany Municipal Airport, Albany, Oregon.Exhibited with VA-164 paint applied.
- 152061: Naval Air Museum Barbers Point (former NAS Barbers Point), Kapolei, Hawaii.
- 152070: Evergreen Aviation Museum, McMinnville, Oregon.It was numbered 149996 and painted.
- 152080: National Museum of the Marine Corps, Marine Corps Air Facility Quantico, Triangle, Virginia.

NA-4E

- 148613: Oriskany Memorial Park, Oriskany, New York.

A-4F

- 154180: Museum of Flight, Seattle, Washington.
- 154200: Army Airfield Museum, Millville, New Jersey.
- 154204: Flying Leatherneck Historical Foundation and Aviation Museum, Marine Corps Air Station Miramar, California.
- 154217 (marked as Blue Angel #4): National Naval Aviation Museum, Naval Air Station Pensacola, Pensacola, Florida.
- 154977: USS Midway Museum, San Diego, California.
- 154983 (marked as Blue Angel #2): National Naval Aviation Museum, Naval Air Station Pensacola, Pensacola, Florida.
- 155009: Empire State Aerosciences Museum, Glenville, New York.
- 155025: NAS Fallon Air Park, Naval Air Station Fallon, Nevada.
- 155027: Quonset Air Museum, Quonset State Airport (former NAS Quonset Point), North Kingstown, Rhode Island.
- 155033 (marked as Blue Angel #3): National Naval Aviation Museum, Naval Air Station Pensacola, Pensacola, Florida.
- 155036: Accomack County Airport, Accomack County, Virginia.

NA-4M

- 155049: Patuxent River Naval Air Museum, Naval Air Station Patuxent River, Lexington Park, Maryland.

TA-4F

- 152102: Naval Museum of Armament & Technology, Covington Municipal Airport, Tennessee.
- 154639: Aviation High School, Long Island City, New York.

TA-4J

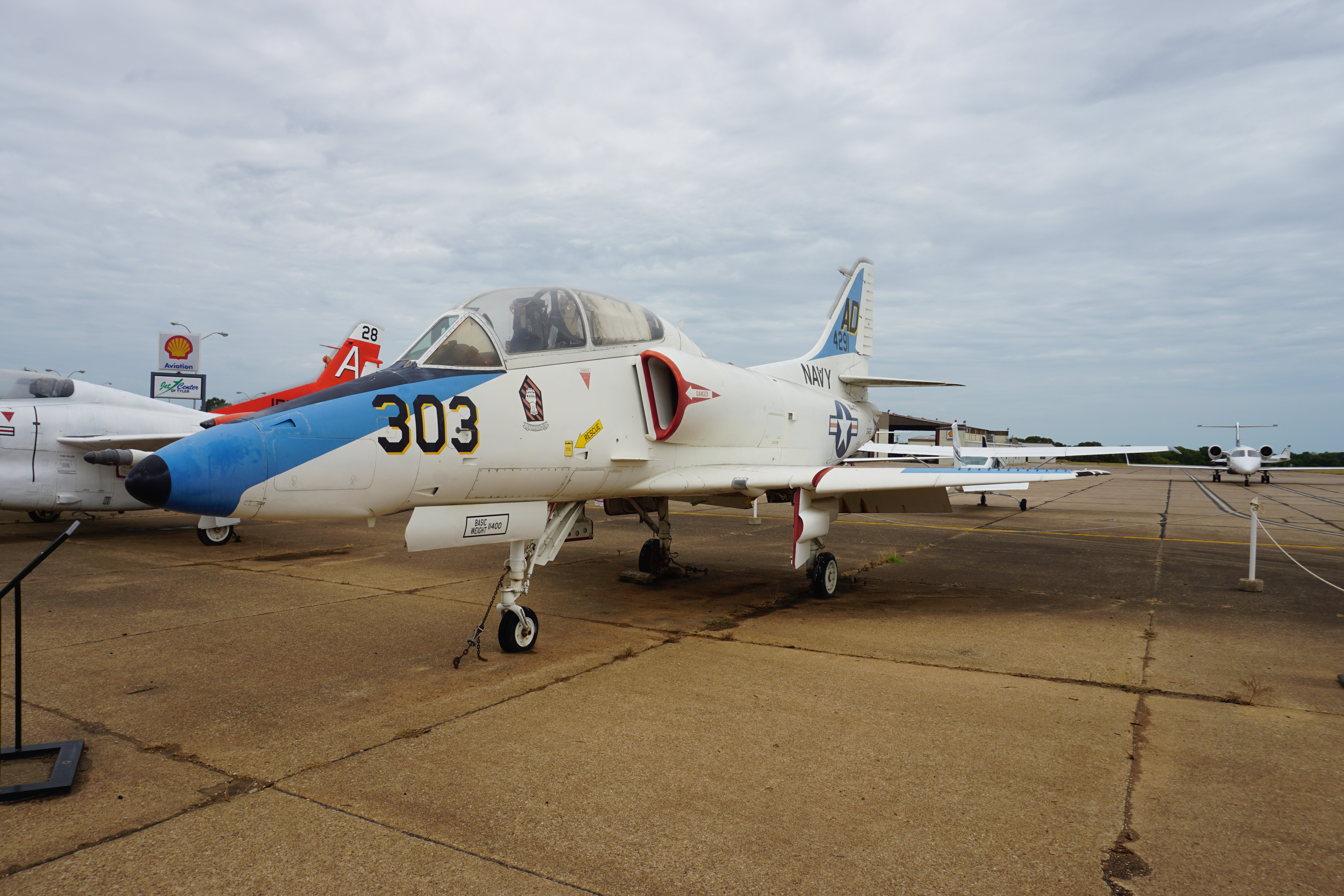
Douglas TA-4J Skyhawk on display at the Historic Aviation Memorial Museum

- 152861: Cape Girardeau Municipal Airport, Scott City, Missouri.
- 152867: Valiant Air Command Warbird Museum, Space Coast Regional Airport, Titusville, Florida.
- 153525: Glenn Martin Aviation Museum, Middle River, Maryland.
- 153671: Grissom Air Museum, Grissom Air Reserve Base, Peru, Indiana.
- 153678: Air Classics Museum of Aviation, Sugar Grove, Illinois.
- 154291: Historic Aviation Memorial Museum, Tyler, Texas.
- 154332: Oakland Aviation Museum, Oakland, California.
- 154338: Kingsville NAS, Kingsville, Texas.
- 154342: March Field Air Museum, March Air Reserve Base (former March AFB), Riverside, California.
- 154649: Palm Springs Air Museum, Palm Springs, California.
- 158073: Fort Worth Aviation Museum, Meacham International Airport, Fort Worth, Texas.
- 158087: Naval Air Station Corpus Christi, Corpus Christi, Texas.
- 158090: American Legion, Middlebury, Vermont.
- 158094: National Naval Aviation Museum, Naval Air Station Pensacola, Pensacola, Florida.
- 158106: Navy Test Pilot School, Naval Air Station Patuxent River, Maryland.
- 158137: USS Hornet Museum, former NAS Alameda, California.
- 158467: Flying Leatherneck Historical Foundation and Aviation Museum, Marine Corps Air Station Miramar, California.
- 158479: Veterans Memorial Park of Delta County, Gladstone, Michigan.
- 158490: Naval Air Station Meridian, Meridian, Mississippi.
- 158512: Estrella Warbirds Museum, Paso Robles, California.
- 158526: Naval Air Station Meridian, Meridian, Mississippi.
- 158716: Combat Air Museum, Forbes Field (former Forbes AFB), Topeka, Kansas.
- 158722: Lexington Museum, Corpus Christi, Texas.
- 159798: Naval Air Facility El Centro, El Centro, California.

A-4L

- No Neme: Planes of Fame Museum, Chino, California
- 147750: Naval Air Station Joint Reserve Base New Orleans, New Orleans, Louisiana.
- 147772: Marine Corps Air Station Beaufort, South Carolina.
- 149635: Mid-America Air Museum, Liberal, Kansas.

A-4M

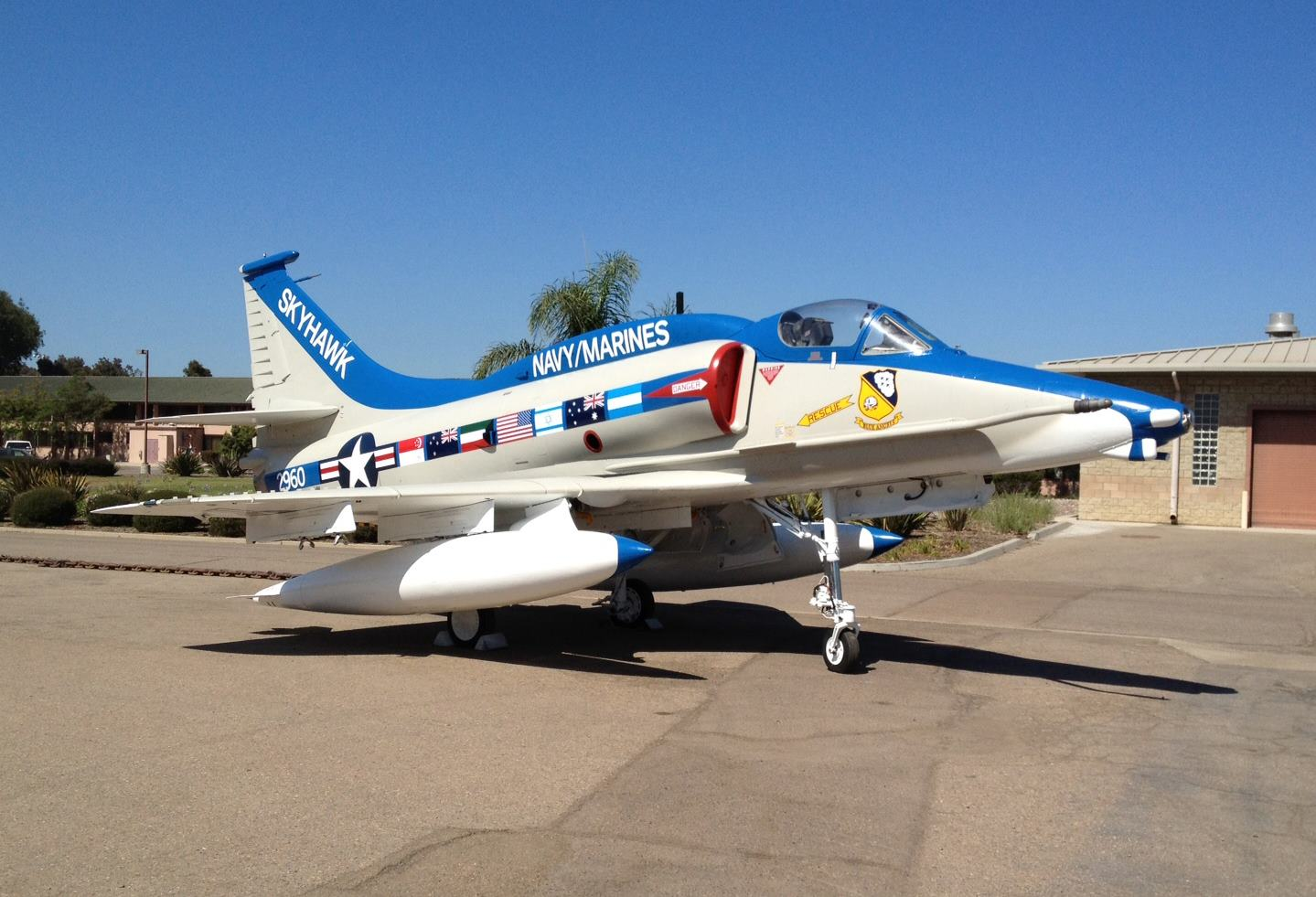
The last production A-4 Skyhawk in its rollout scheme, Flying Leatherneck Aviation Museum, 2012

- 158148: Quonset Air Museum, Quonset State Airport (former NAS Quonset Point), North Kingstown, Rhode Island.
- 158182: Wings of Freedom Aviation Museum, Horsham, Pennsylvania.
- 158195: Museum of Flying, Los Angeles, California.
- 158430: Sequatchie County Veterans Memorial Park, Dunlap, Tennessee.
- 159789: Naval Air Station Joint Reserve Base Fort Worth, Ft. Worth, Texas.
- 160024: City of Havelock Visitor Center, Havelock, North Carolina.
- 160031: 12 Civic Center Plaza, Santa Ana, California.
- 160036: Prairie Aviation Museum, Bloomington, Illinois.
- 160255: Grenada High School, Grenada, Mississippi.
- 160264: Flying Leatherneck Historical Foundation and Aviation Museum, Marine Corps Air Station Miramar, California.

== See also ==
- List of Douglas A-4 Skyhawk operators
