= The Promenade Bolingbrook =

Shopping center in Bolingbrook, Illinois

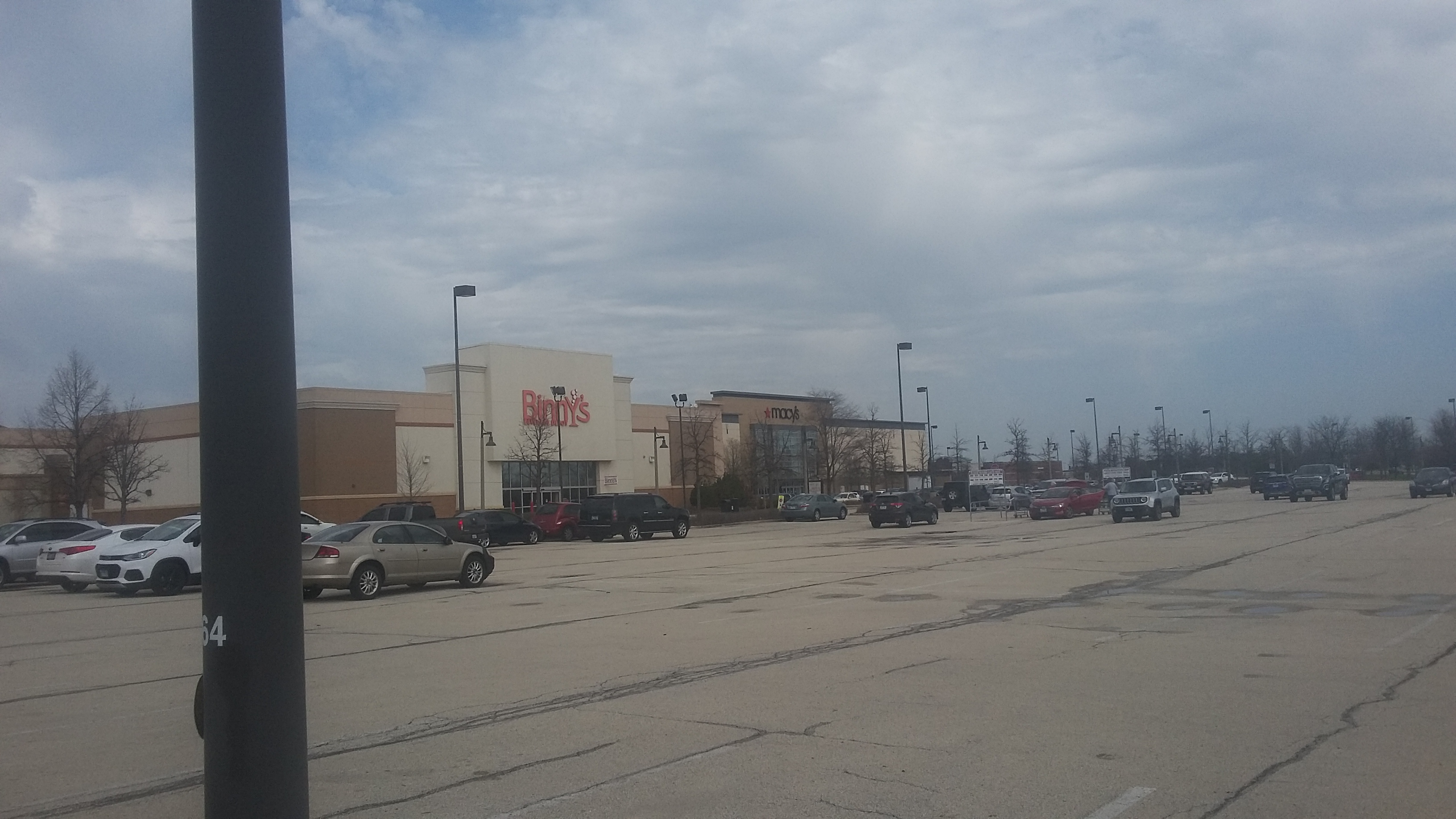
- The Promenade Bolingbrook in April 2022
- Location: Bolingbrook, Illinois, United States
- Coordinates: 41.718951°N 88.041651°W
- Address: 641 East Boughton Road
- Opened: April 26, 2007; 19 years ago
- Developer: Forest City Enterprises
- Manager: Rhino Investments Group
- Owner: Rhino Investments Group
- Num. of stores: 73
- Num. of anchor tenants: 6
- Floor area: 750,000 sq ft (70,000 m^{2})
- Floors: 1 (2 in Macy's, Bass Pro Shops, Star Cinema Grill and management offices)
- Public transit: Pace
- Website: shoppingpromenade.com

The Promenade Bolingbrook, also known as The Promenade, is a 778,000-square-foot (72,300 m^{2}) open-air shopping center in Bolingbrook, Illinois. It opened on April 26, 2007, at the intersection of Boughton Road and Interstate 355. Anchor tenants include Bass Pro Shops, Macy's, Star Cinema Grill, Binny's Beverage Depot, Barnes & Noble and DSW. It is owned and managed by Rhino Investments Group.

Six buildings in The Promenade Bolingbrook have received LEED certification from the U.S. Green Building Council.

== History ==
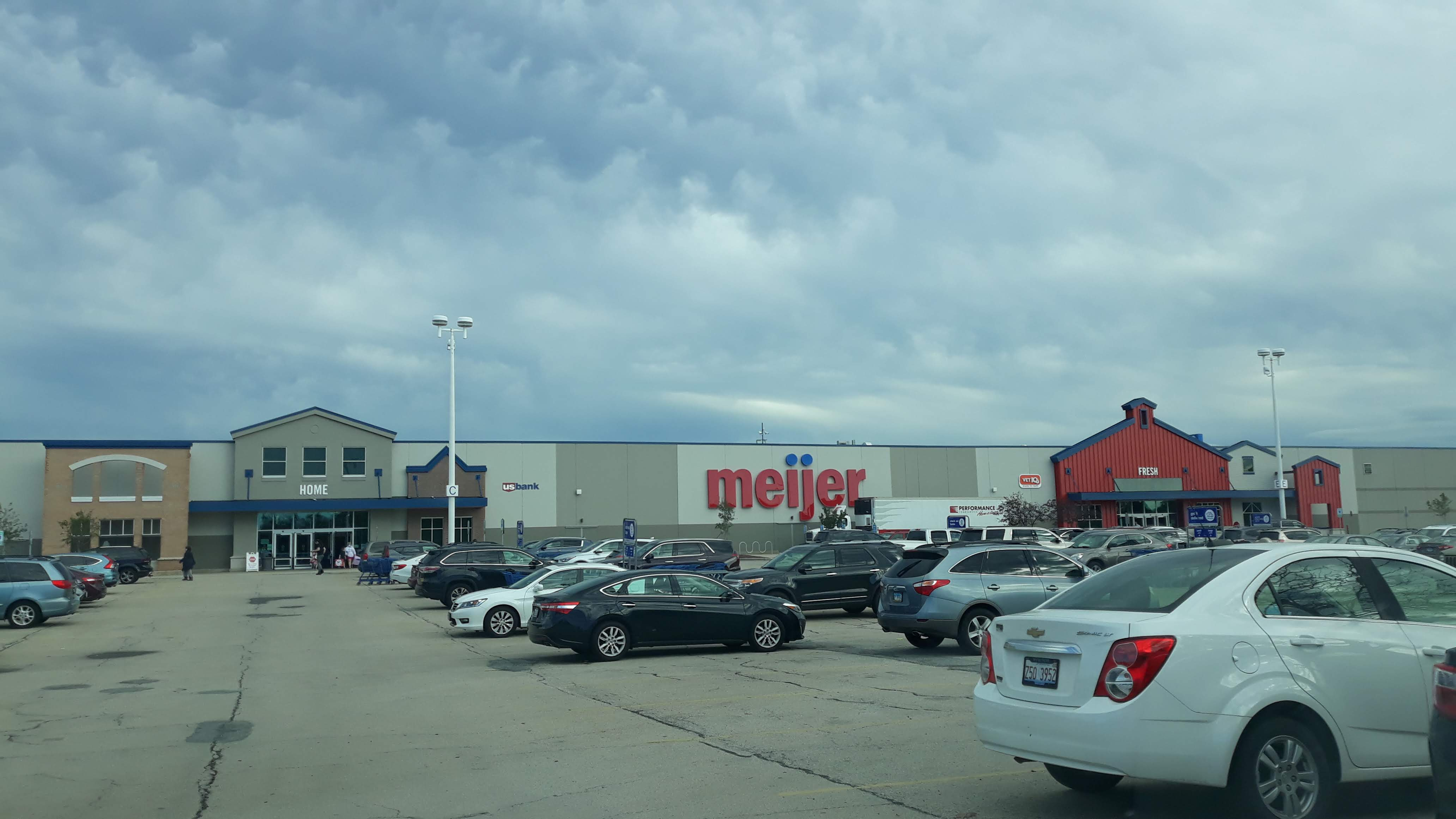
The Meijer store, which opened in 2002, five years before the shopping center's opening

In May 2002, Meijer opened on the shopping center's property, five years prior to its grand opening.

The Promenade Bolingbrook was developed by Cleveland-based Forest City Enterprises, and officially opened on April 26, 2007, with Macy's, Bass Pro Shops, Barnes & Noble, and Circuit City as its original anchors. Macy's was initially planned to be a Marshall Field's prior to Macy's rebranding all of their department stores under the Macy's banner.

Gold Class Cinema would open to the public during the autumn in 2009. It was renamed to iPic Theaters in July 2011. iPic closed on December 31, 2021, before being replaced with Star Cinema Grill in February 2022.

On October 15, 2010, Binny's Beverage Depot opened in the former spot of Circuit City, which went out of business in 2009.

On December 22, 2018, Prince Arcades opened at 12 p.m. The arcade was expanded by July 1, 2024, into an adjacent available lot.

Rhino Investments Group announced that they had obtained an interest in The Promenade on March 31, 2025. Upon obtaining the property, the CEO of Rhino Investments Group stated that plans are being put into place to redevelop the shopping center.

Upcoming tenants to The Promenade include Arra Jewels and BullVino's Churrascaria Brazilian Steak House.

== Expansion ==
Forest City is developing twenty-one acres adjacent to The Promenade Bolingbrook into a mixed-use residential/office development. The development will include at least 160 apartments for low-income residents aged 55 or older. The office space, which is planned to include at least three buildings and will take up 2/3 of the site, is being developed build-to-suit. While construction on the first 80 units of the residential portion is scheduled for late 2009, the office development may take several years to begin, once market conditions rebound.
