= Furqaan Academy =

Islamic school in Bolingbrook, Illinois, USA

Coordinates: 41.6987°N 88.0453°W

Furqaan Academy is a PreK-12 full day Islamic school located in Bolingbrook, Illinois in the Chicago Metropolitan Area. It is under the Al-Furqaan Foundation and it serves western and southwestern suburbs of Chicago. It was founded In 2007. There was a branch in Collin County, Texas that was merged into GoodTree Academy.
