= Bolingbrook Golf Club =

Golf course in Illinois, U.S.

Coordinates: 41.6599°N 88.1537°W

The Bolingbrook Golf Club, a municipal facility located in Bolingbrook, Illinois, United States, features an 18-hole course designed by golf course architect Arthur Hills.

The onsite clubhouse includes a casual restaurant "The Nest Bar and Grill," a restaurant "The East Room," a pro shop, and banquet and meeting facilities. The property also includes the "Golf Academy" featuring a driving range, putting green, and chipping area. The area is open to the public and is accessible by Kings Road.

Bolingbrook Golf Club has hosted numerous professional and amateur tournaments. The 2003 AJGA Chicago Junior earned the course its reputation as "the place where The Egg was tamed " in reference to Andy Johnson, founder of Fried Egg Golf and The Shotgun Start podcast, not being able to crack 80 and finishing T51 (86, 80, 80).

The course hosted LIV Golf's penultimate individual tournament of the 2025 season on August 8-10th.
