= Illinois Aviation Museum =

- Location within Illinois
- Established: 2004
- Location: Bolingbrook, Illinois
- Coordinates: 41.6975°N 88.1278°W
- Type: Aviation museum
- Founders: Joe DePaulo; Ray Jakubiak; Steve Meyers; Tim Tocwish
- Website: www.illinoisaviationmuseum.org

The Illinois Aviation Museum is an aviation museum at Clow International Airport in Bolingbrook, Illinois.

== History ==
The museum was founded by Joe DePaulo, Ray Jakubiak, Steve Meyers and Tim Tocwish in 2004 in a 6,000 sq ft (560 m^{2}) hangar it took over from an organization known as Packer Wings.

In 2009, it acquired the forward fuselage of a T-33.

== Exhibits ==
Exhibits at the museum include a Link Trainer.

== Collection ==
- Aerotek S-1S Special – on loan
- Beechcraft C-45 Expeditor
- Bell UH-1C Iroquois
- Douglas A-4 Skyhawk
- Fokker Dr.I – replica
- Fokker E.III
- Kaminskas Jungster II
- Lockheed T-33 – on loan
- Lockheed T-33 – forward fuselage
- Nieuport 11 – replica, on loan
- Nieuport 12 – replica
- North American T-2 Buckeye – on loan
- Pacific D-8

== Events ==
The Cavalcade of Planes airshow is hosted at the airport.

== Programs ==
The museum has completed build projects of a Zenith CH 750 Cruzer and a replica Fokker E.III.
