= Bolingbrook's Clow International Airport =

- IATA: none; ICAO: none; FAA LID: 1C5

Summary
- Airport type: Public
- Owner: Village of Bolingbrook
- Serves: Bolingbrook, Illinois
- Elevation AMSL: 670 ft (200 m)
- Coordinates: 41°41′46″N 088°07′45″W
- Website: www.bbclowairport.com

Map
- Location of airport in Illinois 1C5 (the United States)

Runways
Direction	Length		Surface
Direction	ft	m	Surface
18/36	3,360	1,024	Asphalt

Statistics (2020)
- Aircraft operations: 50,000
- Based aircraft: 59
- Source: FAA and airport website

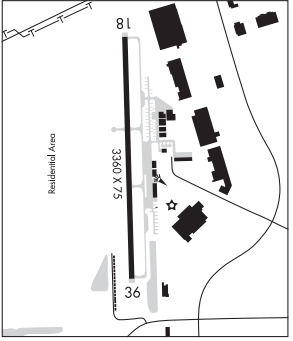
Airport diagram

Bolingbrook's Clow International Airport (FAA LID: 1C5) is a public airport in Bolingbrook, a village in Will County, Illinois, United States. Located 29 miles (46 km) southwest of the Chicago Loop, it is a small general aviation facility catering to private pilots, students, and commuter aircraft.

== History ==
The airport was originally a grass airstrip built by Oliver Boyd Clow in the 1950s. By 1989 it was named the best privately owned, public-use airport in Illinois. It was acquired by the Village of Bolingbrook in 2004. The village has expanded the airport, which includes a widened runway, additional taxiways, and landing glidepath lighting.

The airport was used as a location for the 1992 film Folks! with Tom Selleck and Don Ameche, which included a cameo by Clow, the founder of the airport.

Clow called the airport "Clow International" on the spur of the moment when filing a flight plan. He chose the word "international" to reflect Chicago's mixed ethnicity, rather than the airport's size: his many friends and fellow pilots were of German, Polish, and other ethnic backgrounds now making their homes in Chicago. "It was named on a lark and borders on the ridiculous, but people remember it. Sometimes the absurd is easier to remember," said Clow.

The airport received $2.4 million from the Illinois Department of Transportation during the COVID-19 pandemic as part of the Rebuild Illinois program. The money went toward replacing a taxiway and the airport's rotating beacon.

== Facilities and aircraft ==
Bolingbrook's Clow International Airport covers an area of 205 acres (83 ha) and contains one runway designated 18/36 with a 3,360 x 75 ft (1,024 x 23 m) asphalt pavement.

For the 12-month period ending July 31, 2020, the airport had 50,000 aircraft operations, an average of 137 per day: 96% general aviation and 4% air taxi. For the same time period, there were 59 aircraft based at this airport: 54 single-engine and 4 multi-engine airplanes, and 1 helicopter.

The fixed-base operator (FBO) at Clow is JW Aviation. It offers fuel, aircraft parking and hangars, flight training, and aircraft rental.

== Illinois Aviation Museum ==
The airport is also the location of the Illinois Aviation Museum at Bolingbrook, which includes a collection of restored and replica aircraft.

== Accidents and incidents ==
- On September 25, 2013, a Cirrus SR20 airplane crashed after the pilot attempted a go-around. The plane had two occupants; both were killed.

== See also ==
- List of airports in Illinois
