= Mount Assisi Academy =

Location
- 13860 Main Street; Lemont, Illinois 60439; United States
- 41°41′0″N 87°57′35″W

Information
- Type: private
- Denomination: Roman Catholic
- Established: 1951
- Closed: 2014
- Authority: Archdiocese of Chicago
- President: Kimberly Johnson Quinn
- Principal: Sr. Mary Francis Werner
- Grades: 9–12
- Gender: all-female
- Campus type: suburban
- Colors: Royal Blue and White
- Team name: Eagles
- Accreditation: North Central Association of Colleges and Schools
- Publication: Invision (literary magazine)
- Newspaper: ECHO
- Yearbook: Assisian
- Tuition: $6,800
- Affiliation: School Sisters of St. Francis of Christ the King
- Website: www.mtassisi.org

Mount Assisi Academy was a private, Roman Catholic, all-girls high school in Lemont, Illinois, United States that closed in 2014. It was located in the Roman Catholic Archdiocese of Chicago.

== History ==
Mount Assisi Academy was established in 1951 by the School Sisters of St. Francis of Christ the King. It has been located at its present address since 1955.

Mount Assisi Academy, a comprehensive, Catholic high school for young women, was founded in 1951 at the present provincial center of the School Sisters of St. Francis of Christ the King in Lemont Illinois. As enrollment increased, it was necessary to provide larger facilities and construction of the present building began in 1954.

The year 1955 marked the official opening of the new academy building and Samuel Cardinal Stritch dedicated the new school in 1956. Along with the baby boom of the late 1950s into the 1960s, Mount Assisi continued to grow and thrive, necessitating the addition of three modular classrooms in 1969, and two in 1971, three more in 1981.

The 2010–2011 school year marked the beginning of the 2 year Celebration of the academy's 60-year mission to the young women of the Chicago metropolitan area. There are in the region of 6,200 Mount Assisi Academy alumnae.

On January 30, 2014, Mount Assisi Academy announced that the school would close in May, citing falling enrollment and funding deficits over the past several years. "We deeply regret the heartache that this causes and promise to support our current students and families in any way that is possible as they seek other educational settings and work through this closing and the transition that it calls for in their lives," Sister Therese Ann Quigney, provincial superior, said in a statement on the school's website.

== Academics ==
Daily classes consisted of eight periods lasting 43 minutes each, and a 21-minute homeroom. Opportunities for independent study, as well as participation in co-curricular activities and athletics were also offered.

As a college preparatory, all-girl Catholic high school, Mount Assisi Academy attempted, in the spirit of St. Francis, to provide a holistic education for each young woman who met the criteria of willingness to work and to become a Christian leader of the future.
