= China Lake Museum =

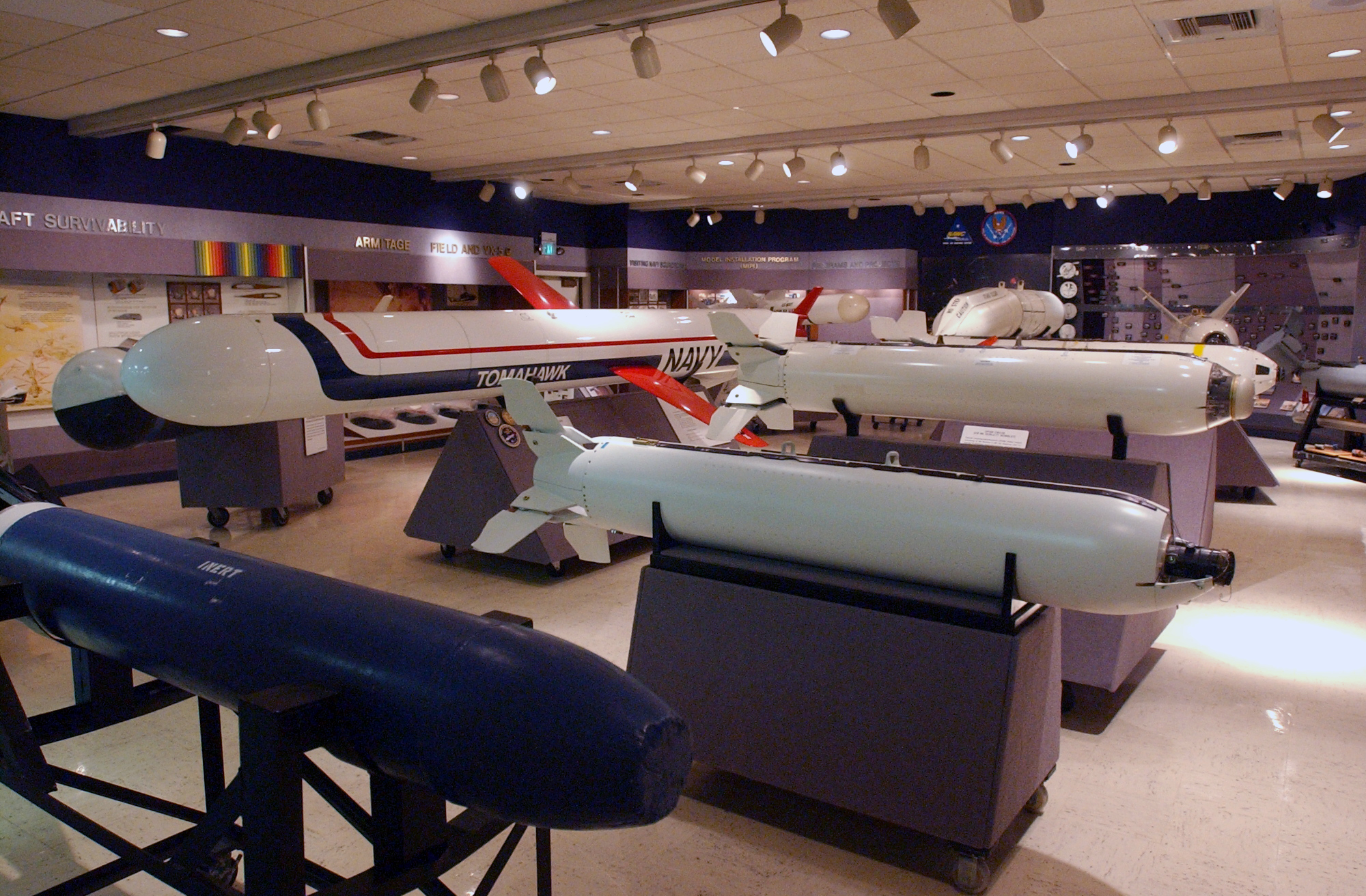

- Location within California
- Former name: U.S. Naval Museum of Armament and Technology
- Established: 2000
- Location: Ridgecrest, California
- Coordinates: 35.6299°N 117.6682°W
- Type: Military museum
- Website: www.chinalakemuseum.org

The China Lake Museum is a military museum in Ridgecrest, California focused on the history of Naval Air Weapons Station China Lake and the development of naval aviation armament and technology.

== History ==
The museum originated with single room at the Weapons Exhibit Center in 1955. The collection was expanded in 1963, but began to deteriorate ten years later due to the expansion of a lab. A man named Milt Burford began efforts to expand the collection again in 1989 and four years after that the China Lake Museum Foundation was established. The organization was officially recognized as the U.S. Naval Museum of Armament & Technology in May 2000. However, in Fall 2011, the museum announced it would no longer be part of the Navy museum system and would change its name to the China Lake Museum.

=== Move ===
Plans to move the museum to the adjoining city of Ridgecrest to improve public access were announced in April 2017. The first phase involved the construction of a parking lot and 2,880 sq ft (268 m^{2}) modular building. Five years later, the museum revealed it had received approval for a second phase with a 7,200 sq ft (670 m^{2}) building.

== Collection ==
=== Aircraft on display ===
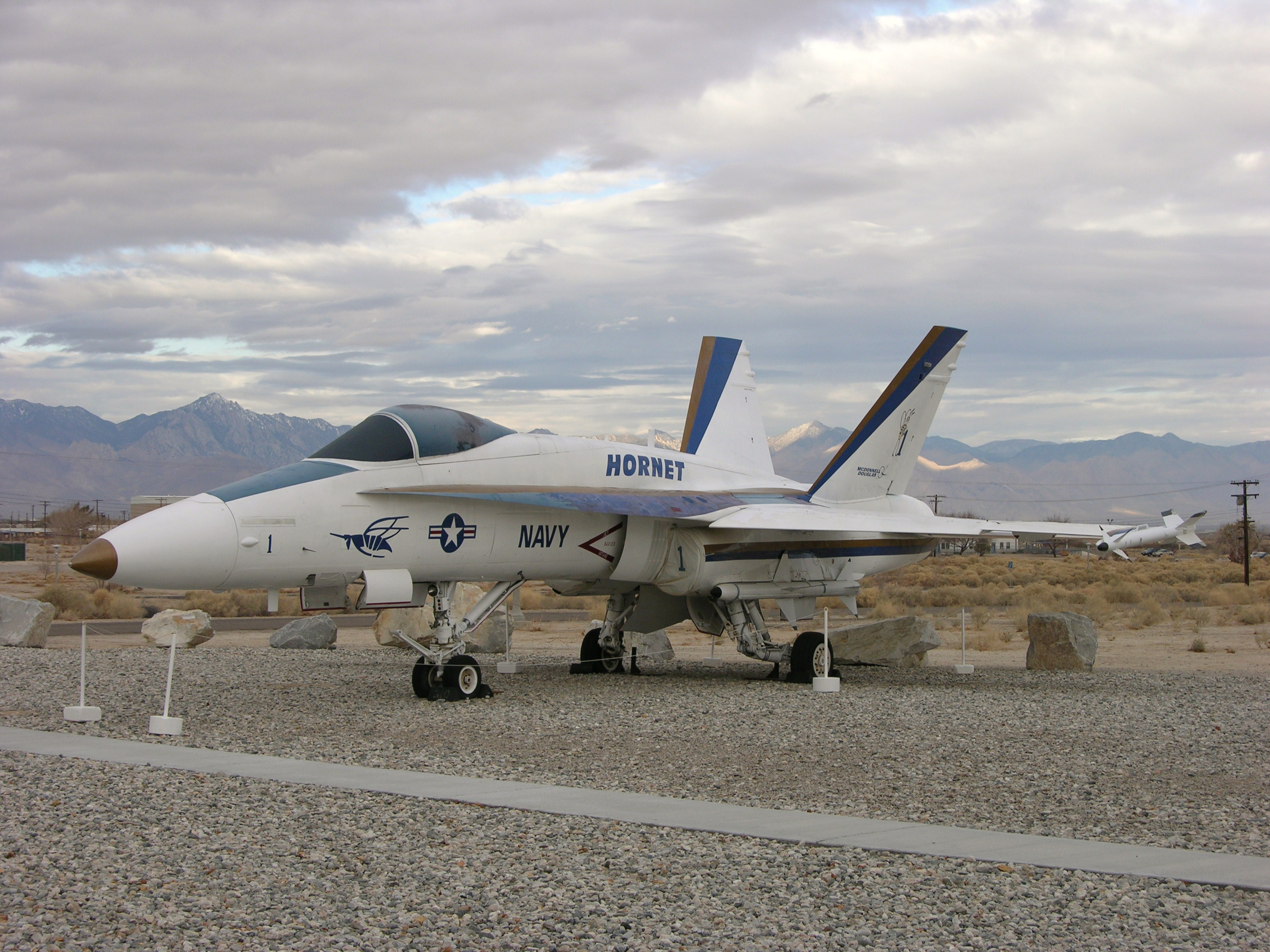
McDonnell Douglas YF-18A Hornet

- Grumman F11F-1F Super Tiger
- McDonnell Douglas YF-18A Hornet
- North American T-39 Sabreliner

=== Munitions on display ===
- AGM-45 Shrike
- AGM-53 Condor
- AGM-62 Walleye
- AGM-65 Maverick
- AGM-83 Bulldog
- AGM-84 SLAM-ER
- AGM-88 HARM
- AGM-122 Sidearm
- AGM-136 Tacit Rainbow
- AGM-154 Joint Standoff Weapon
- AIM-9 Sidewinder
- AIM-54 Phoenix
- ASM-N-2 Bat
- BGM-109 Tomahawk
- CBU-59 APAM
- CBU-78/B GATOR
- GBU-24B/B Paveway III
- Mark 4 nuclear bomb
- Mark 20 Rockeye II
- Mark 80 series

== See also ==
- List of maritime museums in the United States
