= Binny's Beverage Depot =

American liquor store chain

- Industry: Liquor store chain
- Founded: 1948; 78 years ago in Chicago, USA
- Founder: Harold Binstein
- Headquarters: Niles, Illinois, USA
- Area served: Illinois
- Key people: Michael Binstein
- Website: www.binnys.com

Binny's Beverage Depot is a family business liquor store chain in Illinois originally founded in 1948.

The company operates forty-six retail locations, including eight in Chicago, thirty-three in the surrounding area, and one each in Champaign, Springfield, Peoria, Bloomington, and Rockford.

== History ==
The privately held company was founded in 1948 by Harold Binstein as Gold Standard Liquors at Clark and Sheffield, one block south of Wrigley Field. In October 1993, he opened a 30,000-square-foot Binny's Beverage Depot in the suburb of Des Plaines, an early large-format store for the business. By the time of his death in August 1995, the business had grown to 13 stores.

Michael Binstein is the current CEO of Binny's Beverage Depot, having taken over following his father's death in August 1995. The chain has since expanded through new stores and acquisitions, including Sam's Wine & Spirits in 2009, bringing its total to 24 locations. By April 2016, it operated 32 stores in Illinois, all under the Binny's name.
