= Flying Leatherneck Aviation Museum =

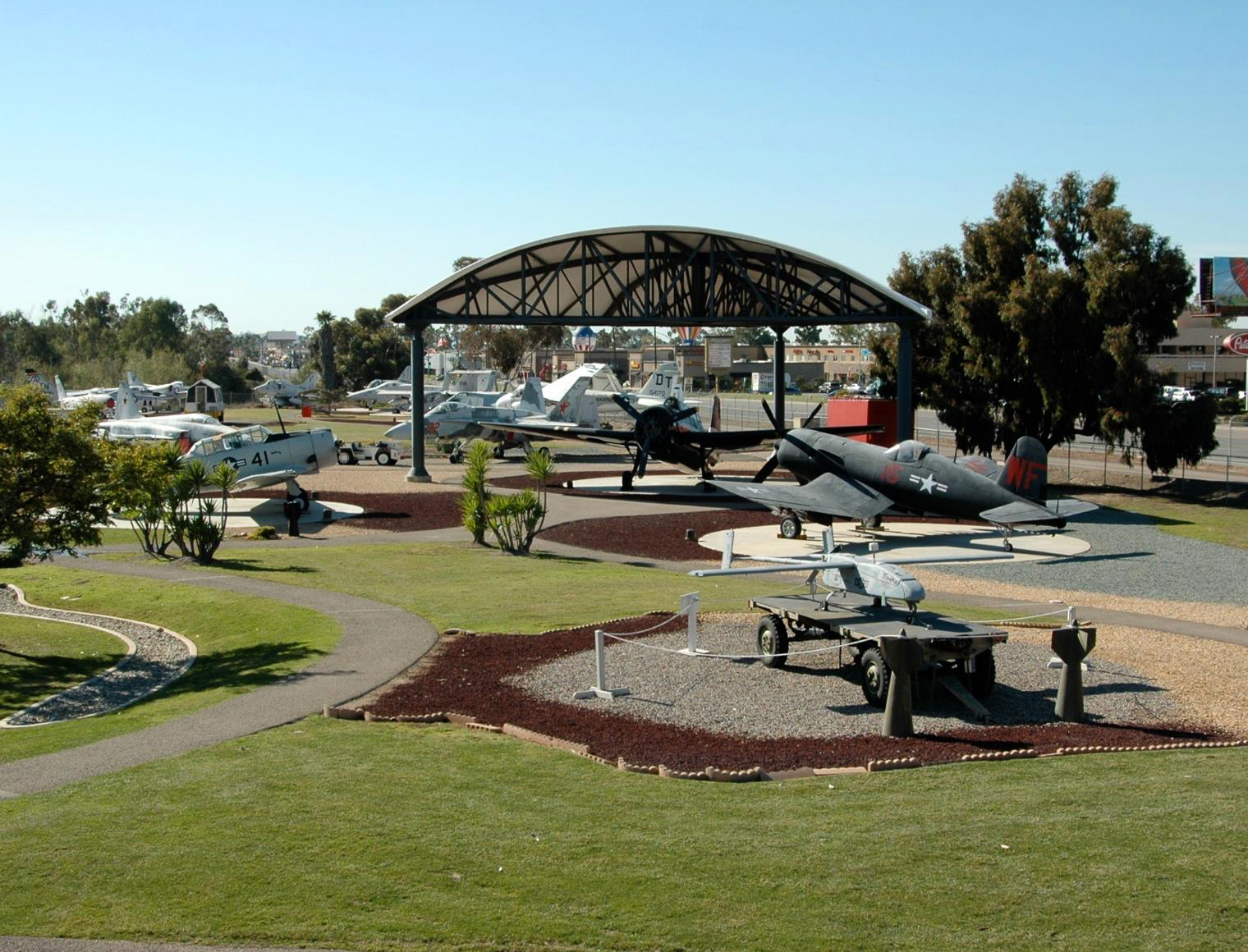

- Location in California
- Former name: El Toro Historical Center and Command Museum; Jay W. Hubbard Aviation Museum
- Established: 1989
- Location: Irvine, California
- Coordinates: 32°53′28″N 117°8′21″W
- Type: Military aviation museum
- Founder: Brig. Gen. Jay W. Hubbard
- Presidents: Brigadier General Michael J. Aguilar, USMC (Ret.)
- Curator: Steve Smith
- Website: flyingleathernecks.org

The Flying Leatherneck Aviation Museum is a United States Marine Corps aviation museum currently located at the Orange County Great Park in Irvine, California. The museum contains exhibits and artifacts relating to the history and legacy of United States Marine Corps Aviation. The outdoor exhibits include 29 historical aircraft, multiple military vehicles and equipment. Indoor exhibits feature photographs, artifacts and artwork from the early days of aviation to the present.

== History ==
The El Toro Historical Center and Command Museum opened to the public in June 1991 in a squadron aviation building at Marine Corps Air Station El Toro. By 1998, the name of the museum had changed to the Jay W. Hubbard Command Museum.

=== Move to Miramar ===
When MCAS El Toro closed in 1999, the museum again changed its name to the Flying Leatherneck Aviation Museum and moved to Naval Air Station Miramar. (Note: At the same time, the MCAS El Toro Historical Foundation was replaced by the Flying Leatherneck Historical Foundation.) The museum's 41 aircraft were loaded onto trailers and towed down highways to the museum's new location, where it reopened on 25 May 2000. There it had a 27,000 sq ft (2,500 m^{2}) restoration hangar. In 2002, the museum announced plans to construct a 30,000 sq ft (2,800 m^{2}) building to display its collection. At the same time, however, increased security on the base after the September 11th attacks made it more difficult for civilians to visit.

Separately, plans for a museum at El Toro began in 2008.

The Flying Leatherneck Historical Foundation was formed to support the museum's efforts and to provide interpretive programs to educate the public on the history and legacy of Marine Corps aviation. These include tours for school field trips, STEM education, the Marine Spouse Award, and annual student essay and art contests.

=== Return to El Toro ===
In 2021, the Marine Corps announced that it would be permanently closing the Flying Leatherneck Aviation Museum and transferring the aircraft to other museums. Subsequently, museum supporters began a campaign to move the museum to a new location.

The Flying Leatherneck Historical Foundation began discussions with the City of Irvine about a possible relocation of the museum back to the former Marine Corps Air Station El Toro. The museum would become part of a planned Cultural Terrace at the former air station, now renamed Orange County Great Park. In December, the museum announced that an agreement had been reached to move the aircraft to the abandoned Marine Aircraft Group 46 hangars. By March 2022, aircraft on loan from the National Naval Aviation Museum were being disassembled in preparation for moves to other museums. (Note: A PV-1 that was scrapped at the new location in 2023 did not belong to the museum and was not part of their collection.) Plans and fundraising are currently underway to move the rest of the aircraft to the new location in Great Park, Irvine, California. The museum began moving aircraft to the new location in the 215,000 sq ft (20,000 m^{2}) Hangar 297 in March 2024. By December 2024, the museum's collections had been moved from Miramar to Hangar 297.

The museum received a copy of 525 oral histories from California State University, Fullerton of individuals connected to El Toro in February 2025.

The museum broke ground on a new 131,000 sq ft (12,200 m^{2}) facility on 28 October 2025.

== Collection ==
=== Aircraft on display ===
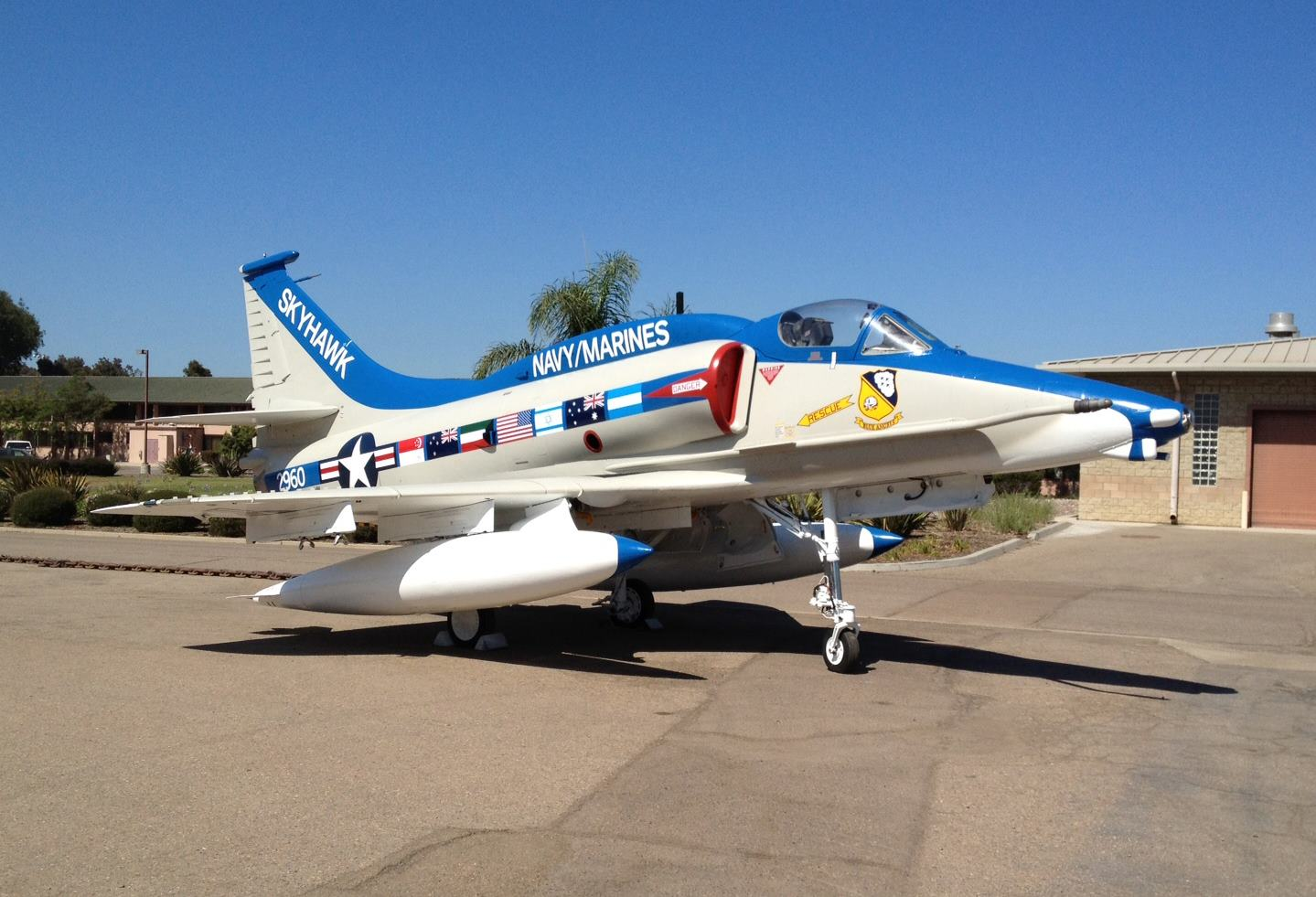
A-4M Skyhawk II

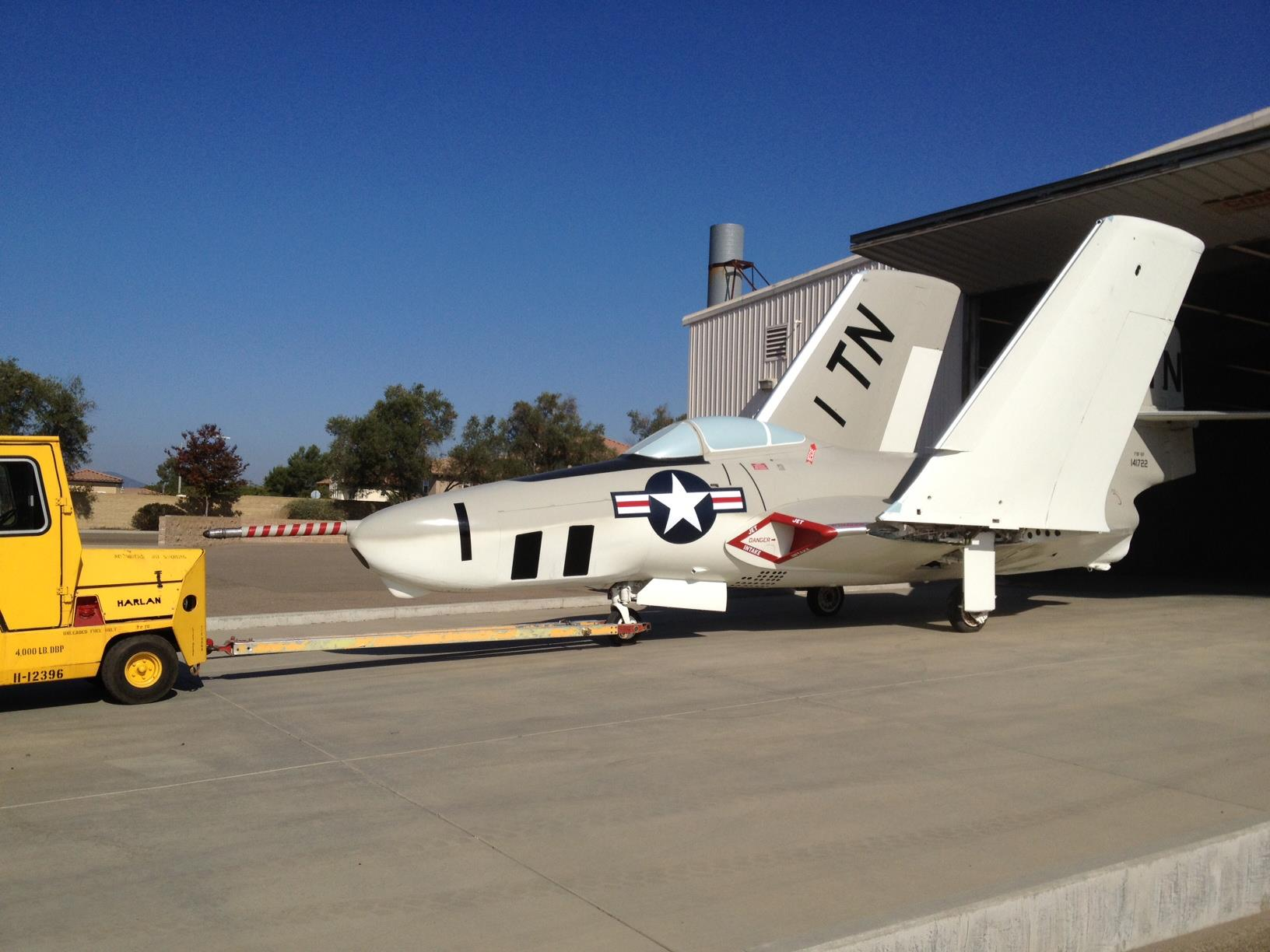
F9F-8P Cougar

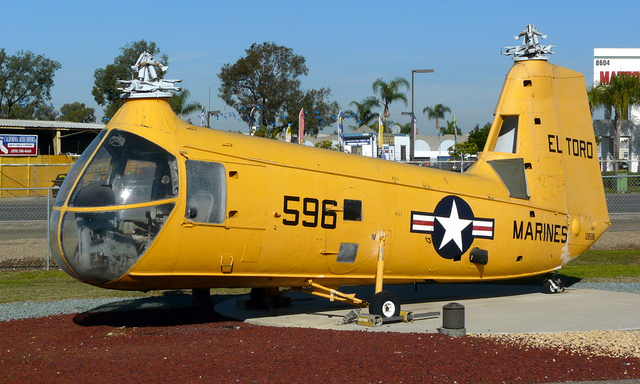
HUP-2 Retriever

- Beechcraft T-34B Mentor 140688
- Bell AH-1J Sea Cobra 157784
- Bell 214ST 28166
- Bell UH-1L Iroquois 157824
- Boeing Vertol CH-46E Sea Knight 154803
- Douglas A-4C Skyhawk 148492
- Douglas A-4F Skyhawk 154204
- Douglas A-4M Skyhawk II 160264
- Douglas TA-4J Skyhawk 158467
- Douglas F3D-2 Skyknight 124630
- Douglas F4D-1 Skyray 139177
- General Motors TBM-3E Avenger 53726
- Grumman A-6E Intruder 154170
- Grumman F9F-2 Panther 123652
- Grumman F9F-8P Cougar 141722
- McDonnell F2H-2 Banshee 124988
- McDonnell Douglas AV-8B Harrier II 165572
- McDonnell Douglas F/A-18A Hornet 161749
- McDonnell Douglas F-4S Phantom II 157246
- McDonnell Douglas RF-4B Phantom II 151981
- Mikoyan-Gurevich MiG-15 81072
- North American SNJ-5 Texan 90866
- North American Rockwell OV-10D Bronco 155494
- Sikorsky CH-53A Sea Stallion 153304
- Sikorsky HRS-3 Chickasaw 130252
- Sikorsky HUS Seahorse 150219
- Vought F8U-2NE Crusader 150920
- Vought RF-8G Crusader 144617

=== Other exhibits ===
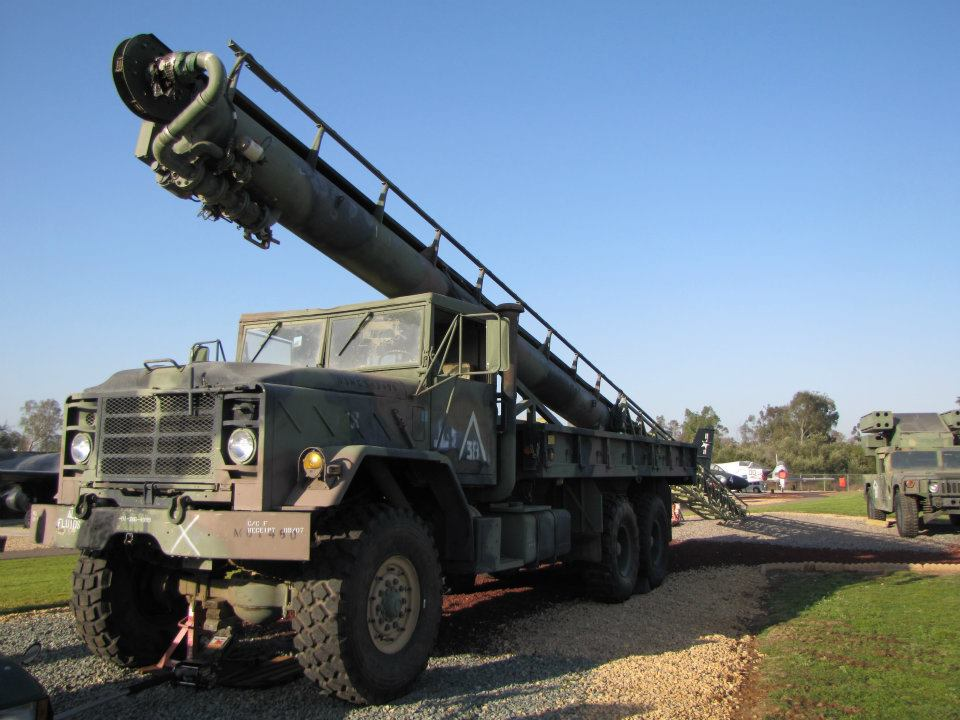
M927 UAV Launch Truck

- AAI RQ-2B Pioneer – This aircraft is mounted to the M927 Truck on display.
- BMP-1 – This vehicle was captured from the Iraqi Army during Desert Storm.
- D-20 – This vehicle was captured from the Iraqi Army during Desert Storm.
- MT-LB – This vehicle was captured from the Iraqi Army during Desert Storm.
- Landing Signals Officer (LSO) Shack
- M1097 Avenger
- M927 Truck

=== In storage ===
- Bell HTL Sioux 64-15338
- Bell UH-1N Twin Huey 159198
- Stinson OY-1 Sentinel 42-14918
- Douglas A-4B Skyhawk 142879
- Ford M151A2
- Kaman HOK-1 Huskie 139990
- Lockheed TO-1 33840
- North American PBJ-1J Mitchell 44-86727 – Under restoration
- Piasecki HUP-2 Retriever 128596 – Under restoration
- Vought RF-8G Crusader 146858

=== MCAS Miramar Post Exchange ===
The following items, being located away from the museum complex, are available only to visitors who have access to the post exchange.

- Douglas R4D-8 50835
- Douglas R5D Skymaster 90392
- Fairchild R4Q Packet 131708

=== Formerly on Display ===
The following items were at one time displayed at the Flying Leatherneck Aviation Museum but have since moved on to other collections.

- Douglas SBD-1 Dauntless 1612 – Under restoration. Now at the Air Zoo, Kalamazoo, Michigan
- General Motors FM-2 Wildcat 16278. Now at the Hickory Aviation Museum, Hickory, North Carolina
- Hawker Siddeley AV-8C Harrier 158387. Now at the Fort Worth Aviation Museum in Fort Worth, Texas
- McDonnell Douglas F/A-18A Hornet 163152 Now at the Pacific Coast Air Museum in Santa Rosa, California
- North American FJ-3 Fury 135883 Now at the USS Midway Museum in San Diego, California
- Northrop F-5E Tiger II 741564. Now at the Pima Air & Space Museum in Tucson, Arizona
- Northrop Grumman EA-6B Prowler 161882. Now at the March Field Air Museum in Riverside, California

== See also ==
- Marine Corps Museums
- United States Marine Corps Aviation
- Naval Aviation Hall of Honor (including USMC)
- United States naval aviator
