= Bolingbrook, Illinois =

- Village
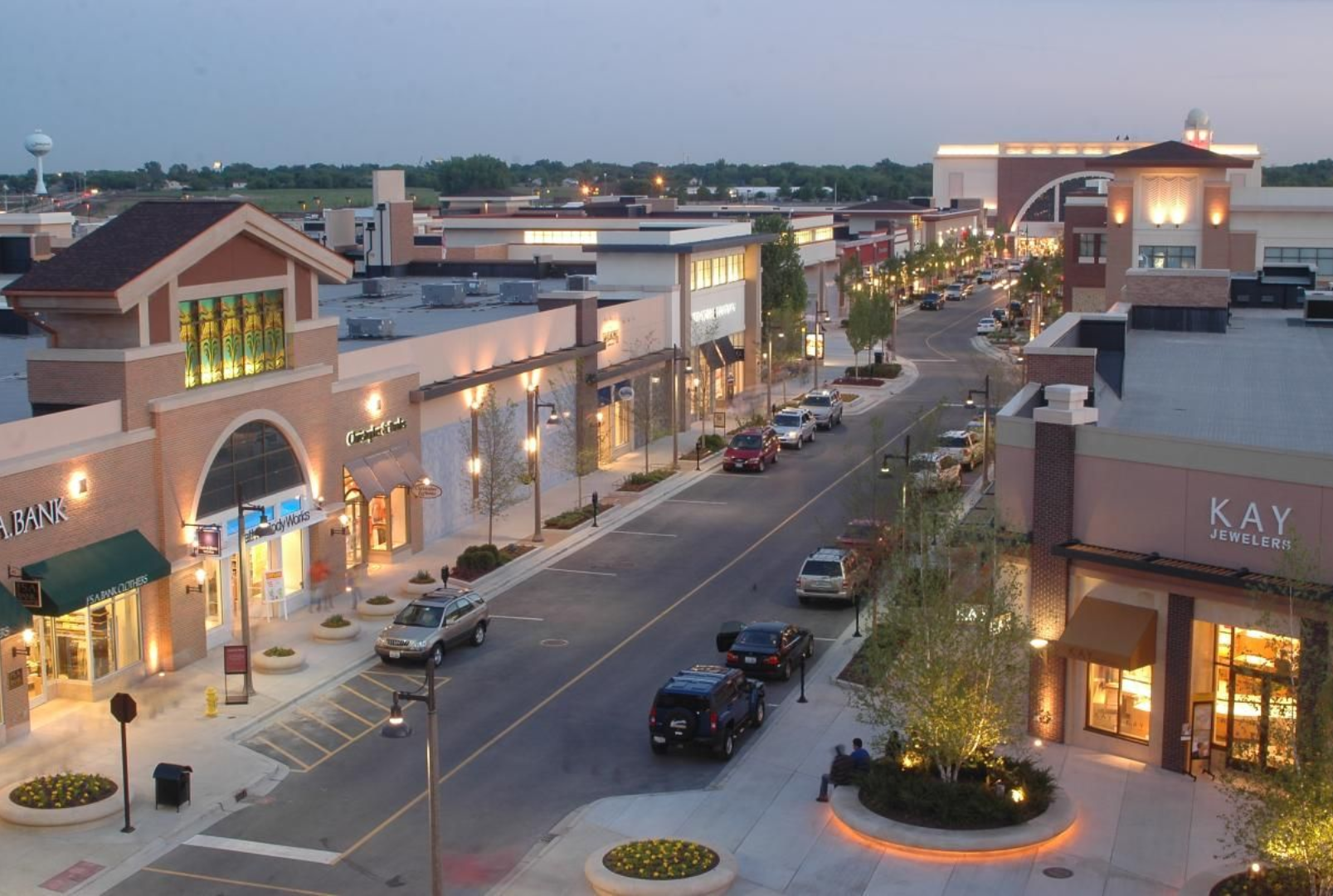
- Downtown Bolingbrook at The Promenade
- Nickname: The Brook
- Motto: A place to grow
- Interactive map of Bolingbrook, Illinois
- Location within Chicago metropolitan area Location within Illinois Location within the United States
- Coordinates: 41°40′52″N 88°07′25″W
- Country: United States
- State: Illinois
- Counties: Will, DuPage
- Township: DuPage, Wheatland, Plainfield, Lisle, Downers Grove
- Incorporated: October 6, 1965

Government
  - Type: Council–manager

Area
  - Total: 25.12 sq mi (65.07 km^{2})
  - Land: 24.92 sq mi (64.54 km^{2})
  - Water: 0.21 sq mi (0.54 km^{2}) 0.87%
- Elevation: 673 ft (205 m)

Population (2020)
  - Total: 73,922
  - Estimate (2024): 74,756 ▲
  - Density: 2,966.7/sq mi (1,145.44/km^{2})
- Time zone: UTC−6 (CST)
  - Summer (DST): UTC−5 (CDT)
- ZIP code(s): 60439, 60440, and 60490
- Area code(s): 630/331 and 815/779
- FIPS code: 17-07133
- GNIS feature ID: 2398147
- Website: www.bolingbrook.gov

Bolingbrook is a village in Will and DuPage counties in the U.S. state of Illinois. It is a southwest suburb of Chicago on I-55 and Historic Route 66 (Frontage Road). The village was a new town built on the Gateway Wetlands west of the Des Plaines River in the 1960s. Bolingbrook experienced rapid growth in the 1980s and 1990s, eventually becoming Will County's second-largest town after Joliet. Per the 2020 census, the population was 73,922. As of 2010, it is the 17th-largest incorporated place in Illinois and the state's second-largest village.

== History ==
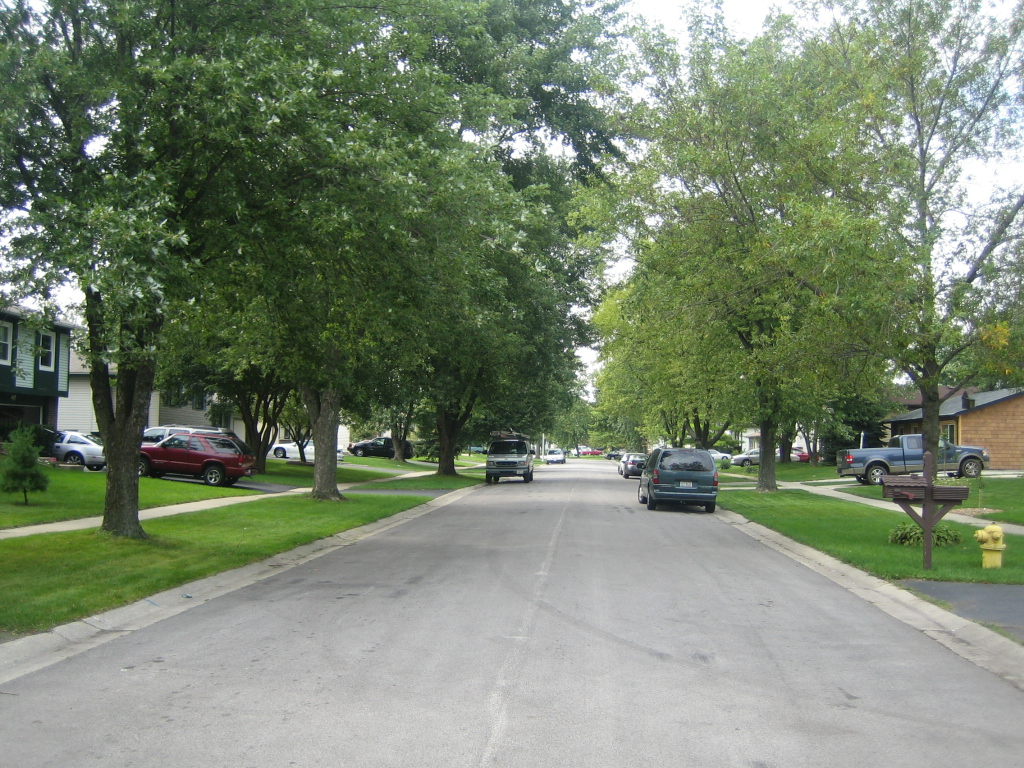
A typical neighborhood street in Bolingbrook

Bolingbrook is a suburb of Chicago incorporated in 1965. Similar to the neighboring village of Woodridge, almost all of the businesses, homes, churches and other buildings in Bolingbrook were built after 1960. The first settlement in what is now Bolingbrook was established in 1831, but the informal farming villages remained unincorporated for over 130 years. The area that is now Bolingbrook is located in the heart of the Gateway Wetlands, which begin in Downers Grove and end just north of the Joliet city limits. The tiny Boardman Cemetery, in what is now the Heritage Creek subdivision, contains the remains of some of these early residents.

Modern Bolingbrook has its roots in the housing boom of the 1950s. The first subdivision in Bolingbrook, known as Westbury, was immediately west of Route 53. A second subdivision, known as Colonial Village, followed on the far east side of Route 53.

The village continued to grow steadily for the remainder of the 1960s, reaching a population of 7,000 by 1970. The 1970s were the first period of rapid growth in Bolingbrook, during which its population quintupled to reach over 37,000 by 1980. Much of this growth was as much due to mass annexation as well as raw population growth; the population of Bolingbrook by the 1970 census but with its 1980 land boundary was approximately 25,000, further reflecting the vigorous annexation that took place during the 1970s.

By 1990, Bolingbrook's population had only increased by about 10% from the previous decade, to about 41,000.

== Geography ==
Bolingbrook is approximately 28 miles southwest of Downtown Chicago.

According to the 2021 census gazetteer files, Bolingbrook has a total area of 25.12 square miles (65.06 km^{2}), of which 24.92 square miles (64.54 km^{2}) (or 99.18%) is land and 0.21 square miles (0.54 km^{2}) (or 0.82%) is water.

Bolingbrook borders the communities of Woodridge, Romeoville, Plainfield, Naperville, and Darien.

Interstate 55, locally the Stevenson Expressway, runs through the village's southern part, heading northeast toward Chicago and southwest toward Plainfield and Joliet. Interstate 355, also known as the Veterans Memorial Tollway (formerly the North-South Tollway), runs along the far east side of the village between New Lenox and Addison. Illinois Route 53, locally known as Bolingbrook Drive, runs north–south through the middle of the village.

Other main streets in Bolingbrook include Boughton Road, Lily Cache Lane, Weber Road, Veterans Parkway (formerly Naperville Road), Briarcliff Road, Hassert Boulevard (formerly 111th Street), Rodeo Drive (formerly 119th Street), Schmidt Road, Crossroads Parkway, and Remington Boulevard.

=== Climate ===
Bolingbrook is in the Hot-summer humid continental climate, or Köppen Dfa zone. The zone includes four distinct seasons. Winter is cold with snow. Spring warms up with precipitation and storms. Summer has high precipitation and storms. Fall cools down.

Climate data for Bolingbrook IL, based on NE Bolingbrook(rain)/Morton Arboretum(temps) (1990-2020)
Month	Jan	Feb	Mar	Apr	May	Jun	Jul	Aug	Sep	Oct	Nov	Dec	Year
Mean daily maximum °F (°C)	31.5 (−0.3)	35.2 (1.8)	47.2 (8.4)	59.2 (15.1)	70.6 (21.4)	80.7 (27.1)	84.4 (29.1)	82.7 (28.2)	76.0 (24.4)	62.6 (17.0)	48.4 (9.1)	36.6 (2.6)	59.6 (15.3)
Daily mean °F (°C)	23.1 (−4.9)	26.4 (−3.1)	36.7 (2.6)	47.7 (8.7)	59.0 (15.0)	69.3 (20.7)	73.1 (22.8)	71.4 (21.9)	64.2 (17.9)	51.5 (10.8)	39.2 (4.0)	28.6 (−1.9)	49.2 (9.5)
Mean daily minimum °F (°C)	14.7 (−9.6)	17.7 (−7.9)	26.1 (−3.3)	36.1 (2.3)	47.4 (8.6)	57.9 (14.4)	61.8 (16.6)	60.2 (15.7)	52.3 (11.3)	40.4 (4.7)	29.9 (−1.2)	20.6 (−6.3)	38.8 (3.8)
Average precipitation inches (mm)	2.10 (53)	1.94 (49)	2.55 (65)	3.95 (100)	4.65 (118)	4.35 (110)	4.60 (117)	4.16 (106)	3.26 (83)	3.64 (92)	2.71 (69)	2.03 (52)	39.94 (1,014)
Source: NOAA

== Demographics ==
Historical population
Census	Pop.	Note	%±
1970	7,651		—
1980	37,261		387.0%
1990	40,843		9.6%
2000	56,321		37.9%
2010	73,366		30.3%
2020	73,922		0.8%
U.S. Decennial Census

=== Racial and ethnic composition ===
Bolingbrook village, Illinois – Racial and ethnic composition Note: the US Census treats Hispanic/Latino as an ethnic category. This table excludes Latinos from the racial categories and assigns them to a separate category. Hispanics/Latinos may be of any race.
Race / Ethnicity (NH = Non-Hispanic)	Pop 2000	Pop 2010	Pop 2020	% 2000	% 2010	% 2020
White alone (NH)	32,618	30,587	26,735	57.91%	41.69%	36.17%
Black or African American alone (NH)	11,324	14,735	14,120	20.11%	20.08%	19.10%
Native American or Alaska Native alone (NH)	83	94	86	0.15%	0.13%	0.12%
Asian alone (NH)	3,570	8,264	10,160	6.34%	11.26%	13.74%
Native Hawaiian or Pacific Islander alone (NH)	26	9	12	0.05%	0.01%	0.02%
Other race alone (NH)	170	149	294	0.30%	0.20%	0.40%
Mixed race or Multiracial (NH)	1,159	1,571	2,667	2.06%	2.14%	3.61%
Hispanic or Latino (any race)	7,371	17,957	19,848	13.09%	24.48%	26.85%
Total	56,321	73,366	73,922	100.00%	100.00%	100.00%

=== 2020 census ===
As of the 2020 census, Bolingbrook had a population of 73,922. The population density was 2,942.29 inhabitants per square mile (1,136.02/km^{2}). The median age was 36.9 years. 24.8% of residents were under the age of 18 and 11.7% were 65 years of age or older. For every 100 females, there were 96.8 males, and for every 100 females age 18 and over, there were 94.8 males age 18 and over.

There were 23,617 households in Bolingbrook, including 18,354 family households. Of all households, 40.0% had children under the age of 18 living in them, 58.7% were married-couple households, 13.6% had a male householder with no spouse or partner present, and 21.6% had a female householder with no spouse or partner present. About 16.7% of households were made up of individuals, and 6.3% had someone living alone who was 65 years of age or older.

There were 24,408 housing units at an average density of 971.50 per square mile (375.10/km^{2}). Of all housing units, 3.2% were vacant. The homeowner vacancy rate was 1.2% and the rental vacancy rate was 7.2%.

99.8% of residents lived in urban areas, while 0.2% lived in rural areas.

=== Income and poverty ===
The median income for a household in the village was $92,184, and the median income for a family was $102,174. Males had a median income of $51,465 versus $37,208 for females. The per capita income for the village was $35,900. About 7.5% of families and 7.8% of the population were below the poverty line, including 13.4% of those under age 18 and 6.8% of those age 65 or over.

=== Ancestry ===
As of the 2022 American Community Survey, the most common ancestries reported in the village were Mexican (23.6%), German (13.3%), Irish (8.3%), Polish (7.4%), Italian (5.7%), Indian (5.5%), English (3.9%), and Filipino (3.9%).

== Economy ==
As of 2019, 24 companies of various sizes have their corporate headquarters in Bolingbrook. The largest of these are the nationwide cosmetic retailer Ulta Beauty and the vehicle floor liner manufacturer WeatherTech. Other corporate headquarters include: ATI Physical Therapy, Stevenson Crane, American Chrome, Computer Projects of Illinois, Diageo, Diamond Technical Services, Epir Technologies, Goya Foods' Illinois division, Midwest Fuel & Injection, G & W Electric, Illinois Paper & Copier, Jet Brite car washes, Wi-Tronix, Perkins Manufacturing, Vision Integrated Graphics, Clark Foam Products, Wastebuilt, COTG - Chicago Office Technology Group, and Windy City Wire.

=== Top employers ===
According to the Bolingbrook Park District's 2017 Comprehensive Annual Financial Report, the top employers in the village are:

#	Employer	# of employees
1	Amazon	7,000
2	Plainfield School District	3,104
3	Presence St. Joseph Medical Center	3,023
4	Silver Cross Hospital	2,771
5	Valley View School District	2,492
6	Will County Government	2,200
7	WeatherTech	1,527
8	Joliet Junior College	1,553
9	Ozinga Brothers Inc.	1,500
10	West Liberty Foods	1,244

== Government ==
John J. "Jack" Leonard was instrumental in the village's incorporation and served as the village's first mayor.

In 1971, Bolingbrook purchased station 2 from the Lemont Fire Protection District, which had been serving much of the village, thus establishing its own fire department. Since then, that station has been expanded and four others have been built.

As of September 2024, the acting mayor of Bolingbrook is Mary Alexander-Basta. On July 31, 2020, longtime mayor Roger C. Claar resigned, having served in the role since 1986; Village Trustee Basta was unanimously appointed by the village board to complete Claar's term.

== Transportation ==
Pace provides bus service in Bolingbrook and throughout the suburban Chicago area. Route 834 provides local service in the village, while routes 755, 850, and 851 run express to Downtown Chicago using the shoulder of Interstate 55 and a number of park-and-ride facilities.

=== Major highways ===
Major highways in Bolingbrook include:

Interstate Highways
Interstate 55
Interstate 355

US Highways
Historic US 66

Illinois Highways
Route 53
Route 126

=== Railways ===
The BNSF Southern Transcon (Santa Fe) and Metra Heritage Corridor lines both run through the adjacent village of Romeoville. At Romeoville station, the Heritage Corridor provides weekday-only, rush-hour, peak-direction service to and from Chicago Union Station.

== Education ==
In Will County, most of Bolingbrook is in the Valley View Community Unit School District 365U while parts are in Indian Prairie Community Unit School District 204, Plainfield Community Consolidated School District 202, and Naperville Community Unit District 203. In DuPage County, the portions of Bolingbrook are in Woodridge School District 68 and Community High School District 99 (Downers Grove High School District 99).

Most of Bolingbrook lies within the boundaries of Fountaindale Public Library District, which, along with the Valley View district, also includes all or portions of nearby Romeoville.

=== Early history ===
School District 365U was originally known as District 94. It took its present name when it became the first school district in the United States to implement the 45-15 plan, in which schools were occupied year-round, with three-quarters of the students in session at any one time. Students went to school for 9 weeks and then had 3 weeks off. Additionally, teachers were optionally allowed to work year-round.

The first school built in Bolingbrook was North View School at 151 E. Briarcliff Rd., Bolingbrook, IL (now closed).

=== High schools ===
Bolingbrook High School

Bolingbrook High School (365U), Plainfield North High School and Plainfield East High School (202), Neuqua Valley High School (204), Naperville Central High School (203), and Downers Grove South High School (99). Romeoville High School also serves as an alternative for some students residing in Valley View 365U.

=== Middle schools ===
In Valley View 365U

- Brooks (in the former Bolingbrook High School building and home of the district's ESL program)
- Jane Addams (near the Bolingbrook Recreation and Aquatic Center)
- Hubert H. Humphrey (near The Promenade Bolingbrook)

In Indian Prairie 204 (Naperville)

- Gregory

In Naperville CUSD 203

- Madison

In Plainfield Community Consolidated School District 202

- Kennedy (Plainfield)

In Woodridge Elementary School District 68

- Jefferson (Woodridge)

=== Elementary schools ===
In Valley View 365U

- Bernard J. Ward (formerly a middle school)
- Independence
- Jamie McGee
- John R. Tibbott
- Jonas E. Salk
- Pioneer
- Oak View
- Wood View

In Indian Prairie 204

- Builta

In Naperville 203

- River Woods

In Plainfield Community Consolidated School District 202

- Liberty
- Elizabeth Eichelberger

In Woodridge Elementary School District 68

- John L. Sipley
- William F. Murphy

=== Alternative schools ===
In Valley View 365U

- (STEP) Secondary Transition Experience Program (also housed in the former Bolingbrook High School building)

=== Private schools ===
Catholic schools: Parochial grade school students may go on to Catholic high schools in proximity to Bolingbrook such as Benet Academy in Lisle, Joliet Catholic Academy in Joliet, and (until its closure in 2014) the all-girls Mount Assisi Academy in Lemont.

Islamic schools:

- Furqaan Academy (PK–12)

Sport Academy:

- Oakbrook Polo Academy 440 Royce Rd, Bolingbrook, IL 60440

== Parks and recreation ==
=== Bolingbrook Park District ===
The Bolingbrook Park District was created in 1970, after being approved by referendum. In 1974, the Park District built its first new building, the Deatherage-Drdak Center, constructed only with volunteer labor. In the following three decades the Bolingbrook Park District has grown to include numerous woodlands and parks, several community centers, the Pelican Harbor Indoor/Outdoor Aquatic Complex, and the Bolingbrook Recreation and Aquatic Complex (BRAC). Most recently, the Bolingbrook Park District was one of the four finalists for the National Gold Medal Award for Excellence in Park Management, Facilities and Programs.

In 1982, the Park District opened the first indoor wave pool in the United States. It was closed shortly after the BRAC and Pelican Harbor opened in 1996, and has since been converted to an ice skating arena.

In 2009, the Park District opened its Hidden Oaks Nature Center, which sits on 80 acres of woodland and river plain habitat. The Nature Center has a Platinum LEED Rating from the U.S. Green Building Council and was built from recycled materials. As of 2014, the Nature Center is used to run naturalist programs and summer camps. Animal residents include: coyotes, deer, great horned owls, and other species common to Northern Illinois.

=== Golf ===
Bolingbrook is home to the Boughton Ridge Golf Course, a nine-hole course owned by the Bolingbrook Park District. In addition, the Bolingbrook Golf Club, a municipal facility which includes an 18-hole course, is in the village. Other Golf Courses within proximity of Bolingbrook include Naperbrook GC, Tamarack GC, Wedgewood GC, and Links at Carillon (all in Plainfield), White Eagle GC and Springbrook GC in Naperville, Village Greens of Woodridge and Seven Bridges GC in Woodridge, Cog Hill GC in Lemont, and Mistwood GC in Romeoville.

=== Aviation ===
Clow International Airport is a small airport off of Boughton-Weber with an estimated 3,362-foot (1,025 m) runway. Clow is a public (non-commercial) airport, owned by the village and operated under a contract with a management company. In 1989, the airport was named the "best privately owned, public use airport in Illinois." Currently, there are 70,000 take-offs and landings at the airport annually.

The Illinois Aviation Museum at Bolingbrook was formed in 2004. The museum is staffed by volunteers and is in a remodeled hangar at Clow International Airport, currently donated by the Village of Bolingbrook.

== Health care ==
UChicago Medicine AdventHealth Bolingbrook is the only hospital in Bolingbrook.

== Notable people ==
- Mustafa Ali, WWE wrestler born in Bolingbrook
- Kenneth Boatright, former professional American football player raised in Bolingbrook
- Ronnie Bull, retired Bears running back who currently lives in Bolingbrook
- Troy Doris, Olympian finalist triple jumper
- J. J. Furmaniak, professional baseball infielder raised in Bolingbrook
- Jerry Harris, cheerleader from Cheer (TV series) raised in Bolingbrook
- Anthony Herron, former professional American football player
- Ben Moore (born 1995), basketball player in the Israeli Basketball Premier League
- Michael S. Pearson, Fort Hood 2009 victim, raised in Bolingbrook
- Drew Peterson, former Bolingbrook police sergeant, convicted felon
- Steve Williams, football player raised in Bolingbrook

== Sister cities ==
- San Pablo City, Laguna, Philippines
- Sialkot, Punjab, Pakistan
- Xuchang, Henan, China
- Brazzaville, Republic of the Congo

== See also ==
- The Promenade Bolingbrook
- Bolingbrook's Clow International Airport
