= Pierce Township, DeKalb County, Illinois =

Pierce Township
- Township
- Location in DeKalb County

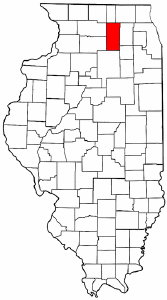
- DeKalb County's location in Illinois
- Coordinates: 41°50′54″N 88°39′29″W
- Country: United States
- State: Illinois
- County: DeKalb
- Established: Prior to 1853

Area
  - Total: 35.07 sq mi (90.8 km^{2})
  - Land: 34.98 sq mi (90.6 km^{2})
  - Water: 0.09 sq mi (0.23 km^{2}) 0.25%
- Elevation: 810 ft (247 m)

Population (2020)
  - Total: 440
  - Density: 13/sq mi (4.9/km^{2})
- Time zone: UTC-6 (CST)
  - Summer (DST): UTC-5 (CDT)
- ZIP codes: 60115, 60119, 60151, 60520
- FIPS code: 17-037-59676

Pierce Township is one of nineteen townships in DeKalb County, Illinois, United States. As of the 2020 census, its population was 440 and it contained 183 housing units.

== History ==
Pierce Township was formed from Squaw Grove and Pampas Township before 1853.

== Geography ==
According to the 2021 census gazetteer files, Pierce Township has a total area of 35.07 square miles (90.83 km^{2}), of which 34.98 square miles (90.60 km^{2}) (or 99.75%) is land and 0.09 square miles (0.23 km^{2}) (or 0.25%) is water.

=== Cities, towns, villages ===
- Maple Park (partial)

=== Cemeteries ===
- Community Methodist
- Saint Marys

== Demographics ==
As of the 2020 census there were 440 people, 207 households, and 98 families residing in the township. The population density was 12.55 inhabitants per square mile (4.85/km^{2}). There were 183 housing units at an average density of 5.22 per square mile (2.02/km^{2}). The racial makeup of the township was 90.91% White, 0.00% African American, 0.00% Native American, 0.23% Asian, 0.23% Pacific Islander, 2.27% from other races, and 6.36% from two or more races. Hispanic or Latino of any race were 6.82% of the population.

There were 207 households, out of which 3.90% had children under the age of 18 living with them, 47.34% were married couples living together, 0.00% had a female householder with no spouse present, and 52.66% were non-families. 20.80% of all households were made up of individuals, and 9.70% had someone living alone who was 65 years of age or older. The average household size was 2.37 and the average family size was 3.29.

The township's age distribution consisted of 5.5% under the age of 18, 18.0% from 18 to 24, 10.2% from 25 to 44, 49.2% from 45 to 64, and 17.1% who were 65 years of age or older. The median age was 55.8 years. For every 100 females, there were 173.7 males. For every 100 females age 18 and over, there were 172.4 males.

The median income for a household in the township was $89,034, and the median income for a family was $141,375. Males had a median income of $12,409 versus $41,758 for females. The per capita income for the township was $38,663. About 12.2% of families and 13.9% of the population were below the poverty line, including none of those under age 18 and 53.6% of those age 65 or over.

Historical population
Census	Pop.	Note	%±
US Decennial Census

== School districts ==
- DeKalb Community Unit School District 428
- Hinckley-Big Rock Community Unit School District 429
- Indian Creek Community Unit District 425
- Kaneland Community Unit School District 302

== Political districts ==
- Illinois's 14th congressional district
- State House District 70
- State Senate District 35
