= Kanesville =

Kanesville may refer to one of the following places in the United States:

- Council Bluffs, Iowa, formerly known as Kanesville
- Kanesville, Utah, a former unincorporated community in Weber County

== See also ==
- Kanesville Tabernacle, a log building in Council Bluffs, Iowa
- Kaneville, Illinois
- Kaneville Township, Kane County, Illinois
