= Ernest Van Leeuwen =

American marathon runner (1912–2007)

Ernest Van Leeuwen (December 30, 1912 - March 30, 2007) was an American marathon runner. He was named the USA Track and Field’s Masters Long Distance Running Outstanding Male Athlete in 1998 and 2003. Van Leeuwen set the record for men over the age of 90 of 6:46:34 at the 2005 Los Angeles Marathon, which would only be broken in 2023 by Italian runner Antonio Rao.

Prior to running, Van Leeuwen was an electrical engineer. In the 1940s, he created a special camera that he used to take time-lapse pictures of the sun, a number of which were displayed by Life magazine. He was awarded the Los Angeles Marathon's courage award in 2006. He died a year later, after suffering a stroke that made him miss the race in Los Angeles.

== See also ==
- List of United States records in masters athletics#Men's marathon
