= Kaneland High School =

Coordinates: 41°52′53″N 88°32′00″W

Location
- 47w326 Keslinger Rd; Maple Park, Illinois 60151

Information
- Type: Public
- Established: July 1, 1958
- School district: Kaneland Community Unit School District 302
- Principal: James Horne
- Teaching staff: 93.60 (FTE)
- Enrollment: 1,268 (2023–2024)
- Student to teacher ratio: 13.55
- Campus: Country
- Colors: Black and white
- Athletics conference: Interstate Eight Conference
- Nickname: Knights
- Newspaper: Kaneland Krier
- Website: khs.kaneland.org

Kaneland High School, or KHS, is a public four-year high school located in Maple Park, Illinois, United States. It is part of Kaneland Community Unit School District 302.

== History ==
Kaneland first opened in 1958.

In Molitor v. Kaneland Community Unit District 302, Illinois opened up school districts to civil lawsuits. The case was over a bus crash during the early years of the school. The father of a student injured in the crash sued for $56,000. The court stated that public school districts should not be immune from civil tort action.

== Academics ==
Kaneland's graduating class of 2014 had an average composite ACT score of 22.2, the highest in the school's history, and graduated 100.0% of its senior class. Kaneland has made Adequate Yearly Progress on the Prairie State Achievement Examination (PSAE), a state test part of the No Child Left Behind Act. In 2013, the school was placed on the Illinois Honor Roll for significantly improving its performance on the PSAE.

== Athletics ==
Kaneland competes in the Interstate Eight Conference and Illinois High School Association. They have a total of eleven Illinois High School State Championships, in football (1997, 1998), boys' track and field (1975, 1977), girls' track and field (1987, 1988, 2016), boys' cross country (1987, 2019), girls' basketball (1982), and baseball (2011).

Kaneland went to the playoffs in football eight times in the past ten school years. From 2010 to 2013, Kaneland did not lose a regular season game.

== Notable alumni ==
- Don Beebe, former NFL player; head coach of Aurora University Spartans football
- Casey Crosby, current MLB free agent
- Dave Dudzinski, professional basketball player
- P. J. Fleck, former NFL player; head coach of Minnesota Golden Gophers football
- Leah Hayes, swimmer, Sports Illustrated Kids 2018 SportsKid of the Year
- Matt Richtman, long-distance runner who won the Los Angeles Marathon in 2025
