= Kaneville Township, Illinois =

Kaneville Township
- Township
- Location in Kane County

- Kane County's location in Illinois
- Coordinates: 41°53′00″N 88°33′00″W
- Country: United States
- State: Illinois
- County: Kane
- Established: November 6, 1849

Area
  - Total: 35.14 sq mi (91.0 km^{2})
  - Land: 35.11 sq mi (90.9 km^{2})
  - Water: 0.02 sq mi (0.052 km^{2}) 0.07%
- Elevation: 850 ft (259 m)

Population (2020)
  - Total: 1,156
  - Density: 32.93/sq mi (12.71/km^{2})
- Time zone: UTC-6 (CST)
  - Summer (DST): UTC-5 (CDT)
- ZIP codes: 60119, 60144, 60151, 60511
- FIPS code: 17-089-38908
- Website: www.kanevilletownship.com

Kaneville Township is one of sixteen townships in Kane County, Illinois, USA. As of the 2020 census, its population was 1,156 and it contained 494 housing units.

== Geography ==
According to the 2021 census gazetteer files, Kaneville Township has a total area of 35.14 square miles (91.01 km^{2}), of which 35.11 square miles (90.93 km^{2}) (or 99.93%) is land and 0.02 square miles (0.05 km^{2}) (or 0.07%) is water. The township is divided roughly into northern and southern halves by Interstate 88.

=== Cities, towns, villages ===
- Big Rock (northern edge)
- Elburn (partial)
- Kaneville
- Maple Park (partial)

=== Unincorporated towns ===
- Kaneland Estates at 41.8783614°N 88.5531364°W
- Meredith at 41.8997427°N 88.5401848°W
- Pine View at 41.8822503°N 88.5514697°W
- Troxel at 41.8341955°N 88.5964695°W

(This list is based on USGS data and may include former settlements.)

=== Cemeteries ===
The township contains these three cemeteries: Gardner, Kaneville and Old Saint Mary's.

== Demographics ==
As of the 2020 census there were 1,156 people, 455 households, and 346 families residing in the township. The population density was 32.90 inhabitants per square mile (12.70/km^{2}). There were 494 housing units at an average density of 14.06 per square mile (5.43/km^{2}). The racial makeup of the township was 89.45% White, 0.17% African American, 0.61% Native American, 1.12% Asian, 0.00% Pacific Islander, 2.25% from other races, and 6.40% from two or more races. Hispanic or Latino of any race were 6.75% of the population.

There were 455 households, out of which 20.00% had children under the age of 18 living with them, 61.10% were married couples living together, 9.45% had a female householder with no spouse present, and 23.96% were non-families. 19.30% of all households were made up of individuals, and 2.60% had someone living alone who was 65 years of age or older. The average household size was 2.43 and the average family size was 2.78.

The township's age distribution consisted of 15.1% under the age of 18, 5.6% from 18 to 24, 17.5% from 25 to 44, 38.4% from 45 to 64, and 23.4% who were 65 years of age or older. The median age was 50.8 years. For every 100 females, there were 92.8 males. For every 100 females age 18 and over, there were 90.3 males.

The median income for a household in the township was $84,779, and the median income for a family was $93,026. Males had a median income of $54,107 versus $38,125 for females. The per capita income for the township was $41,471. About 1.4% of families and 1.4% of the population were below the poverty line, including 2.4% of those under age 18 and 1.9% of those age 65 or over.

Historical population
Census	Pop.	Note	%±
2000	1,237		—
2010	1,264		2.2%
2020	1,156		−8.5%
U.S. Decennial Census

== School districts ==
- Kaneland Community Unit School District 302

== Political districts ==
- Illinois's 14th congressional district
- State House District 50
- State Senate District 25
