= Virgil Township, Kane County, Illinois =

Virgil Township
- Township
- Location in Kane County

- Kane County's location in Illinois
- Coordinates: 41°56′09″N 88°32′48″W
- Country: United States
- State: Illinois
- County: Kane
- Established: November 6, 1849

Area
  - Total: 35.03 sq mi (90.7 km^{2})
  - Land: 35.02 sq mi (90.7 km^{2})
  - Water: 0.01 sq mi (0.026 km^{2}) 0.03%
- Elevation: 863 ft (263 m)

Population (2020)
  - Total: 1,921
  - Density: 54.85/sq mi (21.18/km^{2})
- Time zone: UTC-6 (CST)
  - Summer (DST): UTC-5 (CDT)
- ZIP codes: 60119, 60151
- FIPS code: 17-089-78188
- Website: www.virgiltownship.net

Virgil Township is one of sixteen townships in Kane County, Illinois, USA. As of the 2020 census, its population was 1,921 and it contained 789 housing units. The land is primarily used for agriculture.

== Geography ==
According to the 2021 census gazetteer files, Virgil Township has a total area of 35.03 square miles (90.73 km^{2}), of which 35.02 square miles (90.70 km^{2}) (or 99.97%) is land and 0.01 square miles (0.03 km^{2}) (or 0.03%) is water.

=== Cities, towns, villages ===
- Maple Park (all but western edge)
- Virgil

=== Extinct settlements ===
- Meredith at 41.8994723°N 88.5403588°W
- Richardson at 41.9664165°N 88.5856395°W

=== Cemeteries ===
The township contains these two cemeteries: Saints Peter and Paul's Catholic Cemetery and Thatcher Cemetery.

=== Airports and landing strips ===
- Aeroview Airport
- Miller/Maple Park Farm Airport

== Demographics ==
As of the 2020 census there were 1,921 people, 794 households, and 636 families residing in the township. The population density was 54.84 inhabitants per square mile (21.17/km^{2}). There were 789 housing units at an average density of 22.53 per square mile (8.70/km^{2}). The racial makeup of the township was 88.70% White, 0.31% African American, 0.68% Native American, 0.62% Asian, 0.00% Pacific Islander, 2.39% from other races, and 7.29% from two or more races. Hispanic or Latino of any race were 7.29% of the population.

There were 794 households, out of which 31.40% had children under the age of 18 living with them, 69.02% were married couples living together, 10.20% had a female householder with no spouse present, and 19.90% were non-families. 13.60% of all households were made up of individuals, and 6.30% had someone living alone who was 65 years of age or older. The average household size was 2.86 and the average family size was 3.11.

The township's age distribution consisted of 19.9% under the age of 18, 8.4% from 18 to 24, 27.8% from 25 to 44, 31.2% from 45 to 64, and 12.7% who were 65 years of age or older. The median age was 41.7 years. For every 100 females, there were 109.7 males. For every 100 females age 18 and over, there were 114.4 males.

The median income for a household in the township was $95,714, and the median income for a family was $102,500. Males had a median income of $47,978 versus $47,500 for females. The per capita income for the township was $38,577. About 1.3% of families and 2.5% of the population were below the poverty line, including 0.2% of those under age 18 and none of those age 65 or over.

Historical population
Census	Pop.	Note	%±
2000	1,995		—
2010	1,937		−2.9%
2020	1,921		−0.8%
U.S. Decennial Census

== School districts ==
- Central Community Unit School District 301
- Kaneland Community Unit School District 302
- Sycamore Community Unit School District 427

== Political districts ==
- Illinois's 14th congressional district
- State House District 50
- State Senate District 25
