= Don Beebe =

American football player and coach (born 1964)

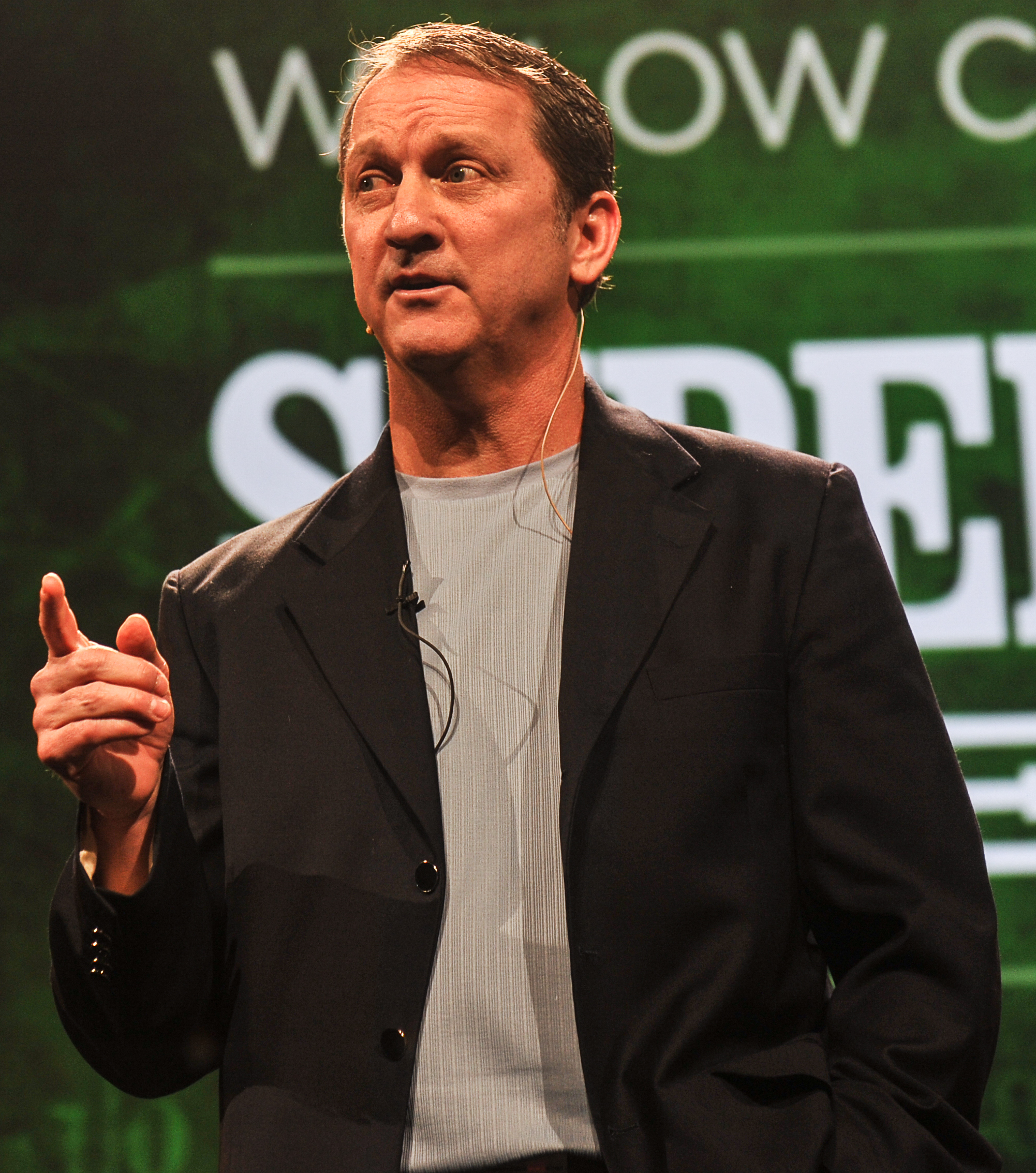
- Beebe in 2015

Aurora Spartans
- Title: Head coach

Personal information
- Born: December 18, 1964 (age 61); Aurora, Illinois, U.S.
- Listed height: 5 ft 11 in (1.80 m)
- Listed weight: 185 lb (84 kg)

Career information
- High school: Kaneland (Maple Park, Illinois)
- College: Western Illinois (1983, 1987); Chadron State (1988)
- NFL draft: 1989: 3rd round, 82nd overall pick

Career history

Playing
- Buffalo Bills (1989–1994); Carolina Panthers (1995); Green Bay Packers (1996–1997)

Coaching
- Aurora Christian HS (2004–2017) Head coach; Aurora (2019–present) Head coach

Awards and highlights
- Super Bowl champion (XXXI)

Career NFL statistics
- Receptions: 219
- Receiving yards: 3,416
- Receiving touchdowns: 23
- Stats at Pro Football Reference

Head coaching record
- Regular season: 55–8 (.873)
- Postseason: 4–5 (.444)
- Career: 59–13 (.819)

Donald Lee Beebe (born December 18, 1964) is an American football coach and former professional wide receiver who is the head coach of the Aurora Spartans. He previously played in the National Football League (NFL) for nine seasons, primarily with the Buffalo Bills. Beebe played college football for the Western Illinois Leathernecks and Chadron State Eagles and was selected by the Bills in the third round of the 1989 NFL draft. Following six seasons with the Bills, he was a member of the Carolina Panthers during their inaugural year and played for the Green Bay Packers in his last two seasons.

A member of the Bills teams that lost four consecutive Super Bowls, Beebe achieved recognition for preventing an opposing touchdown by forcing a fumble in Super Bowl XXVII, despite the Bills facing an insurmountable deficit. He made two further Super Bowl appearances with the Packers and was part of the team winning Super Bowl XXXI. Beebe pursued a coaching career after retirement and was hired as Aurora's head football coach in 2019.

== Early life ==
Beebe is one of five children of Don and Barb Beebe. He attended Kaneland High School in Maple Park, Illinois where he lettered in basketball, track and football, graduating in 1983. After attending Western Illinois University, he transferred to Chadron State College in Nebraska, where he set several school football records his senior year and ran a 6.3 60-yard dash on the indoor track team.

In his sole season with Chadron State, Beebe caught 49 passes for 906 yards and rushed 10 times for 81. He became the first player in school history to score a touchdown in every game, while also setting single-season school records for most all-purpose yards (1,661), points scored (90), and touchdowns (15). In 2000, Beebe was inducted into Chadron State's athletic hall of fame.

As of 2020, he still holds the following Chadron State football records:

- Most touchdown receptions in a game: 4 vs. Black Hills State, 1988
- Most touchdowns scored: 5 vs. Black Hills State, 1988
- Kick Returns and Kick Return Yards in a season: 29 for 722 yards, 1988

== NFL career ==
Pre-draft measurables
Height	Weight	Arm length	Hand span	40-yard dash	10-yard split	20-yard split	20-yard shuttle	Vertical jump	Broad jump
5 ft 10 3/4 in (1.80 m)	176 lb (80 kg)	33 5/8 in (0.85 m)	10 in (0.25 m)	4.38 s	1.53 s	2.59 s	4.08 s	36.5 in (0.93 m)	9 ft 7 in (2.92 m)
All values from NFL Combine

Beebe was drafted by the Buffalo Bills in the third round (82nd pick overall) of the 1989 NFL draft. He posted impressive statistics in speed and agility drills at the 1989 pre-draft combine.

In his nine NFL seasons, Beebe caught 219 passes for 3,416 yards, rushed for 28 yards, returned 81 kickoffs for 1,735 yards, and scored 25 touchdowns (23 receiving, one kickoff return, and one fumble recovery). He appeared in five Super Bowls as a player: XXVI, XXVII, and XXVIII with the Buffalo Bills (missing XXV due to injury) and XXXI and XXXII with Green Bay. While Buffalo lost its four consecutive title games, Beebe ultimately won a Super Bowl with the Packers in XXXI.

Beebe is known for his play in Super Bowl XXVII against the Dallas Cowboys. In the game's fourth quarter, Cowboys defensive tackle Leon Lett recovered a Bills fumble and advanced the ball toward the end zone. Lett began to celebrate prematurely, however, by holding the ball out to his right side. Although the Bills were losing 52–17 at the time, Beebe streaked down the field and knocked the ball out of Lett's hands just before he crossed the goal line. The loose ball went through the end zone and out of bounds for a touchback and prevented a Dallas touchdown, which would have given them a Super Bowl-record 58 points, plus an extra point kick. Beebe also caught two passes for 50 yards, including a 40-yard touchdown reception from Frank Reich earlier in the game.

Beebe played one season for the Carolina Panthers in 1995 before finishing his career with the Packers. In 1996, Beebe ended up being the Packers' second-leading receiver, with 39 receptions, 699 receiving yards, 4 touchdown receptions, as well as the only kickoff return touchdown of his career. In an overtime battle against the San Francisco 49ers, Beebe had 11 receptions for 220 yards and one touchdown in a 23–20 Packer victory. Beebe stumbled and fell after catching a pass from Favre. Beebe got up and ran the ball in for a 59-yard touchdown. Replays show that he was tagged by Marquez Pope and should have been ruled down, but referees missed the call and video review was not available that year.

== NFL career statistics ==
Legend
	Won the Super Bowl
**Bold**	Career high

=== Regular season ===
Year	Team	Games		Receiving					Rushing					Kick returns				
Year	Team	GP	GS	Rec	Yds	Avg	Lng	TD	Att	Yds	Avg	Lng	TD	Ret	Yds	Avg	Lng	TD
1989	BUF	14	0	17	317	18.6	63	2	0	–	–	–	–	**16**	353	22.1	85	0
1990	BUF	12	4	11	221	**20.1**	49	1	1	**23**	**23.0**	**23**	0	6	119	19.8	27	0
1991	BUF	11	7	32	414	12.9	34	**6**	0	–	–	–	–	7	121	17.3	24	0
1992	BUF	12	8	33	554	16.8	65	2	1	-6	-6.0	-6	0	0	–	–	–	–
1993	BUF	14	**14**	31	504	16.3	65	3	0	–	–	–	–	10	160	16.0	22	0
1994	BUF	13	11	**40**	527	13.2	72	4	**2**	11	5.5	6	0	12	230	19.2	35	0
1995	CAR	14	1	14	152	10.9	24	1	0	–	–	–	–	9	215	23.9	38	0
1996	GB	**16**	6	39	**699**	17.9	**80**	4	0	–	–	–	–	15	**403**	**26.9**	**90**	**1**
1997	GB	10	0	2	28	14.0	23	0	0	–	–	–	–	6	134	22.3	39	0
Career		116	51	219	3,416	15.6	80	23	4	28	7.0	23	0	81	1,735	21.4	90	1

=== Postseason ===
Year	Team	Games		Receiving					Kick returns				
Year	Team	GP	GS	Rec	Yds	Avg	Lng	TD	Ret	Yds	Avg	Lng	TD
1989	BUF	1	0	1	17	**17.0**	17	0	2	53	**26.5**	32	0
1990	BUF	0	0	Did not play due to injury									
1991	BUF	3	2	11	144	13.1	**43**	1	1	0	0.0	0	0
1992	BUF	**4**	**3**	**12**	**186**	15.5	40	**2**	0	–	–	–	–
1993	BUF	3	**3**	9	88	9.8	18	0	**3**	**71**	23.7	**34**	0
1996	GB	3	0	2	31	15.5	29	0	1	25	25.0	25	0
1997	GB	0	0	DNP									
Career		14	8	35	466	13.3	43	3	7	149	21.3	34	0

== Coaching career ==
In 1998, Beebe founded House of Speed, LLC, a company that specializes in training athletes in the essentials of top performance, speed and character. House of Speed began franchise operations in 2006 and has locations in eleven states. Beebe also works with several professional, collegiate and amateur sports organizations in the area of speed, including the Chicago Bears, the Los Angeles Rams, the University of Illinois Fighting Illini and Club Fusion Volleyball.

In 2004, Beebe began coaching football for Aurora Christian Schools in Aurora, Illinois. He—along with his brother, defensive coordinator David Beebe, and brother Dan, the school's athletic director—led the Eagles to the school's first state championship appearance in 2008, where the team finished as 4A state runner-up after losing to Bloomington Central Catholic 37–28. Three years later Beebe and the Eagles returned to the finals, this time winning the 2011 IHSA Class 3A State Championship with a 34–7 win over Mt. Carmel. In 2012, Beebe led the Eagles to a second straight IHSA Class 3A State Championship by defeating Tolono-Unity 42–12 before stepping down as coach after the 2013 season and an overall 97–26 record. His brother succeeded him as head coach.

In November 2018, Beebe was named the head coach at Aurora University, replacing Rick Ponx, who was fired just the day before.

== Personal life ==
In 2000, Chadron State renamed its renovated football stadium after Beebe, calling it Elliott Field at Don Beebe Stadium. Beebe wrote a book with Denise Crosby titled Six Rings from Nowhere. As of 2014, a deal was in the works to develop the book into a feature film about Beebe's life and Christian faith. Beebe's son, Chad, was a wide receiver for Northern Illinois University, a wide receiver for the Minnesota Vikings NFL team from 2018 to 2022, and was a wide receiver for the Houston Texans in 2022.

== Head coaching record ==
=== College ===
Year	Team	Overall	Conference	Standing	Bowl/playoffs	D3^{#}	AFCA^{°}
Aurora Spartans (Northern Athletics Collegiate Conference) (2019–present)
2019	Aurora	9–2	7–0	1st	L NCAA Division III First Round	24	
2020–21	Aurora	3–0	3–0	T–1st			
2021	Aurora	8–3	8–0	1st	L NCAA Division III First Round		
2022	Aurora	11–2	8–0	1st	L NCAA Division III Quarterfinal	13	
2023	Aurora	11–1	8–0	1st	L NCAA Division III Second Round	13	12
2024	Aurora	9–2	8–0	1st	L NCAA Division III Second Round	14	14
2025	Aurora	8–3	6–2	2nd	W Lakefront		
2026	Aurora	0–0	0–0				
Aurora:		59–13	48–2				
Total:		59–13					
National championship Conference title Conference division title or championship game berth
