= Matt Richtman =

American long-distance runner (born 2000)

Personal information
- Born: January 13, 2000 (age 26)
- Education: Kaneland High School; Bradley University; Montana State University

Sport
- Country: United States
- Sport: Sport of athletics
- Events: Half marathon, Marathon
- College team: Bradley Braves; Montana State Bobcats

Achievements and titles
- Personal bests: Road; Half marathon: 1:01:14 (Atlanta 2025); Marathon: 2:07:46 (Los Angeles 2025)
- Updated on March 17, 2025

Matthew Richtman (born January 13, 2000) is an American long-distance runner. In 2025, he became the first American winner of the Los Angeles Marathon since 1994 in a time of 2:07:46 hours.

== Career ==
Richtman was the 2017 Illinois High School Association winner in cross country running, and had high school personal bests of 4:17 and 9:14 in the 1600 m and 3200 m respectively. He spent two years running for the Bradley Braves track and field program before transferring to the Montana State Bobcats track and field team in 2020. He did not qualify for any NCAA outdoor or indoor track finals, though he did finish 112th, 40th, and 26th at the NCAA Division I men's cross country championships finals from 2021 to 2023.

At the 2024 Twin Cities Marathon, Richtman made his marathon debut, running 2:10:47 to finish 4th. Following that result, he finished 6th at the 2025 USA Half Marathon Championships while preparing for his Los Angeles Marathon run. At the 2025 Los Angeles Marathon in March, Richtman improved upon his best time by over three minutes, running 2:07:46, the race's 2nd fastest time in history to become the first American winner of the race in 31 years. His win led some to consider him favored to make the U.S. marathon team at the 2028 Summer Olympics in Los Angeles.

== Personal life ==
Richtman is from Elburn, Illinois where he attended Kaneland High School from 2014 to 2018. He majored in mechanical engineering at Montana State. His sister Becca was a NAIA women's outdoor track and field championship winner in the 3000 m steeplechase for the Montana Tech Orediggers track and field team.

== Statistics ==
=== Personal best progression ===
Marathon progression
#	Mark	Pl.	Competition	Venue	Date	Ref.
1	2:10:47	4th	Twin Cities Marathon	Minneapolis, MN	October 6, 2024	
2	2:07:46	1st place, gold medalist(s)	Los Angeles Marathon	Los Angeles, CA	March 16, 2025	
3	DNF after 20 km	-	Los Angeles Marathon	Los Angeles, CA	March 8, 2026	
