= 2019 Los Angeles Marathon =

American foot racing event in California

34th Los Angeles Marathon
- Venue: Los Angeles, United States
- Date: March 24, 2019

Champions
- Men: Elisha Barno (Elite); Joshua Cassidy (Wheelchair)
- Women: Askale Merachi (Elite); Katrina Gerhard (Wheelchair)

The 2019 Los Angeles Marathon, the 34th annual edition of the Los Angeles Marathon, was held in Los Angeles, California, United States on March 24, 2019. The men's race was won by Kenya's Elisha Barno, and the women's race was won by Ethiopia's Askale Merachi in a course record time. The race is the fourth-largest marathon in the U.S. with 19,992 finishers. The last finisher crossed the finish line 8:43:03 after the 6:55 a.m. start.

== Summary ==
Elisha Barno won the 2019 Los Angeles Marathon with a record time for a Kenyan runner of 2:11:45, John Korir of Kenya finished second with a time of 2:11:52, Juan Luis Barrios finished third with a time of 2:11:59.

For 15 miles, several of the elite men ran together in a pack. With Korir often leading the pack, there was little to no gap between those at the front, which included fellow Kenyans Weldon Kirui and Philemon Cheboi, Mexican Juan Luis Barrios, and American Tyler McCandless. Shortly after the 20 mile mark, Korir surged ahead, cranking out sub-5 minute miles. The gap between him and the rest of the pack widened to nearly a half-minute with three miles to go.

In the last half mile, Korir ran past the roar of the crowd on Ocean Avenue toward Santa Monica Pier, unaware that Barno was closing the gap by running a furious pace. Korir's pace had slowed considerably; he did not look back, and with only 200 meters left, Barno passed him.

Barno, an experienced marathoner with four consecutive marathon wins at Grandma's Marathon in Duluth, Minnesota, crossed the finish line seven seconds ahead of Korir and collapsed on the blacktop, covering his face with his hands. Korir crossed the finish, made the sign of the cross, knelt next to him, grabbed his hand and congratulated him on the win. It was the closest finish in the Los Angeles men's marathon history.

Askale Merachi won the women's race with a time of 2:24:11. She left the pack of lead women with Cynthia Jerop, and the two ran side by side until just after the 20-mile mark.

Joshua Cassidy won the men's wheelchair race and Katrina Gerhard claimed the women's equivalent.

== Results ==
The results were as follows.

=== Men ===
Men's top-10
Position	Athlete	Nationality	Time
1st place, gold medalist(s)	Elisha Barno	Kenya	2:11:45
2nd place, silver medalist(s)	John Korir	Kenya	2:11:52
3rd place, bronze medalist(s)	Juan Luis Barrios	Mexico	2:11:59
4	Milton Rotich	Kenya	2:13:24
5	Weldon Kirui	Kenya	2:13:24
6	Philemon Cheboi	Kenya	2:13:30
7	Lawi Kiptui	Kenya	2:13:57
8	Oleksandr Sitkovsjiy	Ukraine	2:14:01
9	Roman Romanenko	Russia	2:14:29
10	Hillary Chesire	Kenya	2:14:44

Video of podium ceremony for the men by ABC News correspondent Natalie Brunell

=== Women ===
Women's top-10
Position	Athlete	Nationality	Time
1st place, gold medalist(s)	Askale Merachi	Ethiopia	2:24:11 course record
2nd place, silver medalist(s)	Cynthia Jerop	Kenya	2:25:54
3rd place, bronze medalist(s)	Lucy Karimi	Kenya	2:26:15
4	Olha Skrypak	Ukraine	2:30:33
5	Jane Kibii	Kenya	2:32:12
6	Lindsey Anderson	United States	2:34:44
7	Belaynesh Fikadu	Ethiopia	2:35:35
8	Joan Massah	United States	2:35:54
9	Taylor Ward	United States	2:36:26
10	AnnMarie Kirkpatrick	United States	2:41:40

Video of podium ceremony for the women by ABC News correspondent Natalie Brunell

=== Wheelchair men ===
Position	Athlete	Nationality	Time
1st place, gold medalist(s)	Joshua Cassidy	Canada	1:31:47
2nd place, silver medalist(s)	Tristan Smyth	United States	1:38:33
3rd place, bronze medalist(s)	Josh George	United States	1:39:48

=== Wheelchair women ===
Position	Athlete	Nationality	Time
1st place, gold medalist(s)	Katrina Gerhard	United States	1:56:22
2nd place, silver medalist(s)	Jenna Fesemyer	United States	2:04:14
3rd place, bronze medalist(s)	Michelle Wheeler	United States	2:10:30
