= Hinckley, Illinois =

Hinckley
- Village
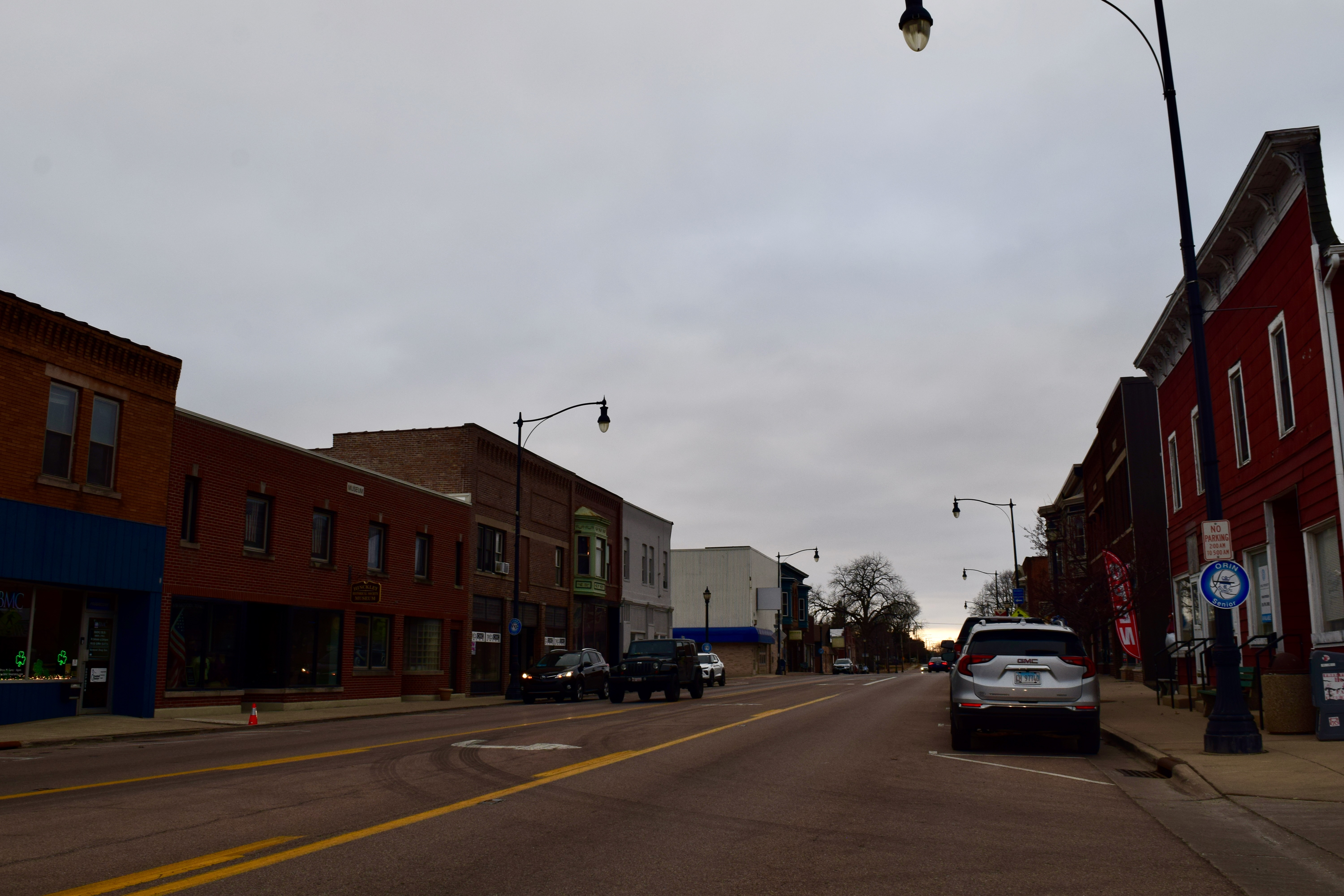
- Downtown Hinckley

- Location of Hinckley in DeKalb County, Illinois.
- Coordinates: 41°46′12″N 88°37′48″W
- Country: United States
- State: Illinois
- County: DeKalb
- Township: Squaw Grove

Area
  - Total: 0.85 sq mi (2.21 km^{2})
  - Land: 0.85 sq mi (2.19 km^{2})
  - Water: 0.0077 sq mi (0.02 km^{2})
- Elevation: 751 ft (229 m)

Population (2020)
  - Total: 2,006
  - Density: 2,368.7/sq mi (914.57/km^{2})
- Time zone: UTC-6 (CST)
  - Summer (DST): UTC-5 (CDT)
- ZIP code: 60520
- Area code: 815
- FIPS code: 17-35268
- GNIS feature ID: 2398512
- Website: www.hinckleyil.gov

Hinckley is a village in Squaw Grove Township, DeKalb County, Illinois, United States. The population was 2,006 at the 2020 census, a slight decline from 2,070 at the 2010 census.

== History ==
In the 1830s, a Mr. Hollenbeck, who lived near Ottawa, Illinois, was traveling the then-unsettled territory. He found a grove of trees west of the present-day Hinckley and named it Squaw Grove, after the Native American women who were tending camp.

In the spring of 1835, John Sebree built a log house. The following year, more families came to the area and a small town was started at the west edge of what is now Hinckley, which was named Squaw Grove.

Hinckley was conceived in the 1870s as the brainchild of Francis Hinckley, president of the Chicago and Iowa Railroad. The rail line was placed one-half mile east of the Village of Squaw Grove, which was then named Hinckley.

The first store came to Hinckley in 1872. By 1876, Hinckley had twenty businesses.

The Methodist Church began in 1835, and St. Paul's Church came in 1885. A volunteer fire brigade was organized in 1886.

In 1889, a tornado destroyed most of the village.

On January 7, 1927, the Harlem Globetrotters played their first road game in Hinckley.

== Education ==
Hinckley is a part of the Hinckley-Big Rock Community Unit School District 429, which operates three schools:

- Hinckley-Big Rock Elementary School is located on the west side of Hinckley on US HWY 30.
- Hinckley-Big Rock Middle School is located in the center of Big Rock on US HWY 30.
- Hinckley-Big Rock High School is located on the east side of Hinckley on US HWY 30.

== Geography ==
According to the 2021 census gazetteer files, Hinckley has a total area of 0.86 square miles (2.23 km^{2}), of which 0.85 square miles (2.20 km^{2}) (or 99.06%) is land and 0.01 square miles (0.03 km^{2}) (or 0.94%) is water.

== Demographics ==
Historical population
Census	Pop.	Note	%±
1880	368		—
1890	496		34.8%
1900	587		18.3%
1910	661		12.6%
1920	665		0.6%
1930	626		−5.9%
1940	710		13.4%
1950	774		9.0%
1960	940		21.4%
1970	1,053		12.0%
1980	1,447		37.4%
1990	1,682		16.2%
2000	1,994		18.5%
2010	2,070		3.8%
2020	2,006		−3.1%
U.S. Decennial Census

=== Racial and ethnic composition ===
Hinckley village, Illinois – Racial and ethnic composition Note: the US Census treats Hispanic/Latino as an ethnic category. This table excludes Latinos from the racial categories and assigns them to a separate category. Hispanics/Latinos may be of any race.
Race / Ethnicity (NH = Non-Hispanic)	Pop 2000	Pop 2010	Pop 2020	% 2000	% 2010	% 2020
White alone (NH)	1,916	1,917	1,734	96.09%	92.61%	86.44%
Black or African American alone (NH)	6	10	11	0.30%	0.48%	0.55%
Native American or Alaska Native alone (NH)	4	3	2	0.20%	0.14%	0.10%
Asian alone (NH)	2	7	17	0.10%	0.34%	0.85%
Native Hawaiian or Pacific Islander alone (NH)	0	4	2	0.00%	0.19%	0.10%
Other race alone (NH)	0	7	3	0.00%	0.34%	0.15%
Mixed race or Multiracial (NH)	16	13	73	0.80%	0.63%	3.64%
Hispanic or Latino (any race)	50	109	164	2.51%	5.27%	8.18%
Total	1,994	2,070	2,006	100.00%	100.00%	100.00%

=== 2020 census ===
As of the 2020 census, Hinckley had a population of 2,006. The median age was 38.7 years. 25.3% of residents were under the age of 18 and 15.2% were 65 years of age or older. For every 100 females, there were 103.9 males, and for every 100 females age 18 and over, there were 98.0 males age 18 and over.

0.0% of residents lived in urban areas, while 100.0% lived in rural areas.

There were 766 households in Hinckley, of which 32.4% had children under the age of 18 living in them. Of all households, 55.2% were married-couple households, 16.8% were households with a male householder and no spouse or partner present, and 21.1% were households with a female householder and no spouse or partner present. About 25.4% of all households were made up of individuals, and 10.9% had someone living alone who was 65 years of age or older.

There were 830 housing units, of which 7.7% were vacant. The homeowner vacancy rate was 1.7% and the rental vacancy rate was 10.7%. The population density was 2,346.20 inhabitants per square mile (905.87/km^{2}), and the average housing unit density was 970.76 per square mile (374.81/km^{2}).

Racial composition as of the 2020 census
Race	Number	Percent
White	1,793	89.4%
Black or African American	11	0.5%
American Indian and Alaska Native	2	0.1%
Asian	19	0.9%
Native Hawaiian and Other Pacific Islander	2	0.1%
Some other race	38	1.9%
Two or more races	141	7.0%

=== Income and poverty ===
The median income for a household in the village was $70,278, and the median income for a family was $79,667. Males had a median income of $54,028 versus $35,417 for females. The per capita income for the village was $33,663. About 4.9% of families and 8.9% of the population were below the poverty line, including 5.4% of those under age 18 and 5.7% of those age 65 or over.

== Popular culture ==
In 1981, Hinckley served as a stand-in for fictional North Crawford in Jonathan Demme's film adaptation of Who Am I This Time? by Kurt Vonnegut, Jr. Christopher Walken and Susan Sarandon portray two painfully shy people who find one another through a community theater production of "A Streetcar Named Desire", in which they portray the tempestuous Stanley and Stella Kowalski.
