= Grace Ravlin =

American painter

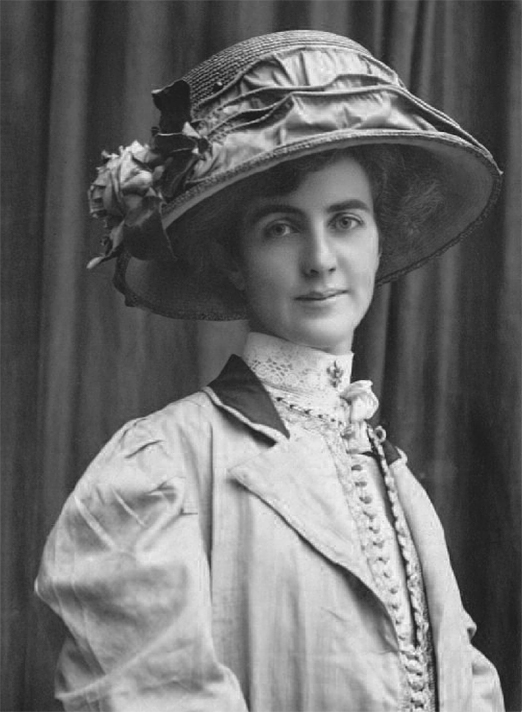
- Portrait photograph of Grace Ravlin taken about 1905
- Born: 15 April 1873; Kaneville, Illinois
- Died: 25 September 1956 (aged 83)

Grace Ravlin (April 15, 1873 – September 25, 1956) was an American artist known for painting festivals, ceremonies, and other communal events in places like Tangier, Taos, and Venice. Born in a Midwestern farming community, she showed an early interest in both music and art and, opting for the latter, was able to obtain instruction first from teachers who worked at the Art Institute of Chicago and later from William Merritt Chase at the Pennsylvania Academy of the Fine Arts. Having decided to become a professional artist, she traveled to Paris in 1906 and, using that city as a base of operations, spent much of the rest of her career painting outdoors in European and North African locales. When residing in the United States, she based herself in New York City or Chicago and from there traveled to the Northeastern coast, the Southwestern deserts, and Mexico. Along with her paintings of people and places, she made still-life florals that drew praise from art critics. During the course of her long career, she exhibited widely, received prestigious awards, and achieved notable sales of her works.

== Early life and training ==
Ravlin was born on April 15, 1873, in the farming community of Kaneville, Illinois. On graduating from elementary school, she commuted to Chicago to attend the large and newly constructed South Division High School. Her youthful plans to study music changed in her third year when she took art classes from visiting instructors from the School of the Art Institute of Chicago. After graduating, she worked as a teacher in Kaneville. She used her savings from her salary and a bequest she received after the death of her father in 1899 to start studying as a full-time student. She spent a summer in Delavan, Wisconsin, taking outdoor art classes from John Vanderpoel, and in the fall of 1902 began two years of study at the Art Institute. There, she was elected secretary of a students' association called the Art Students' League, and in 1904, a painting of hers called "Misty Day at Rocky Neck" received a prize as best oil painting in an exhibition of works by members of the association. While studying at the Art Institute, she showed her work in its exhibitions of student work, and during this time spent one summer traveling and painting on the coasts of Connecticut and Massachusetts. Between 1904 and 1906, Ravlin studied under William Merritt Chase in Philadelphia at the Pennsylvania Academy of the Fine Arts, where she began a practice of completing a still life each day.

== Art career ==
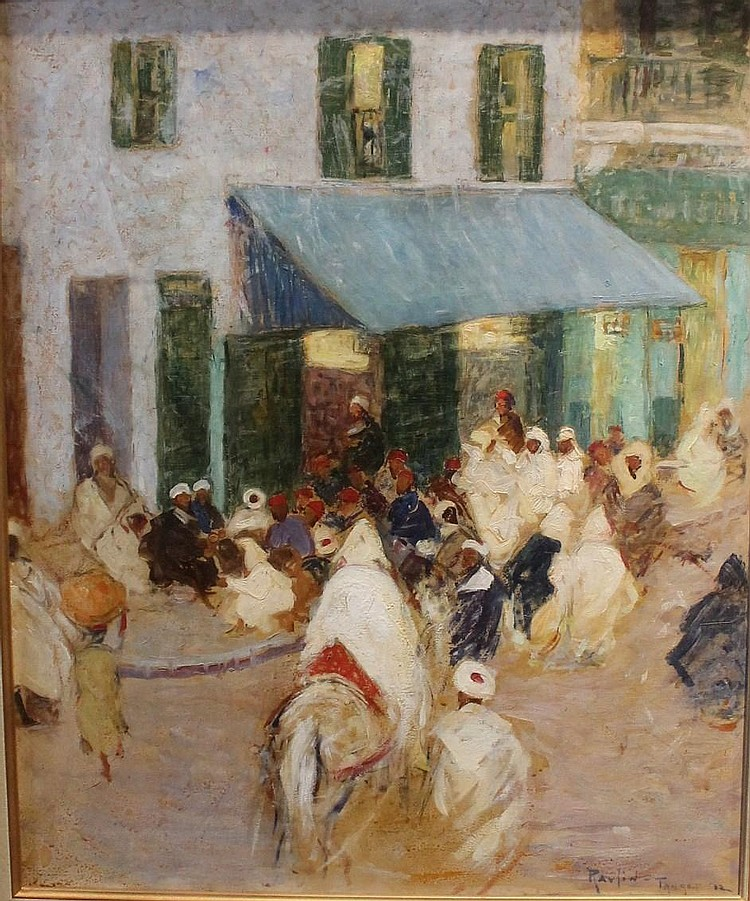
Grace Ravlin, Street Scene, Tangier, oil on canvas, 1912, 28 3/4 x 23 7/8 inches

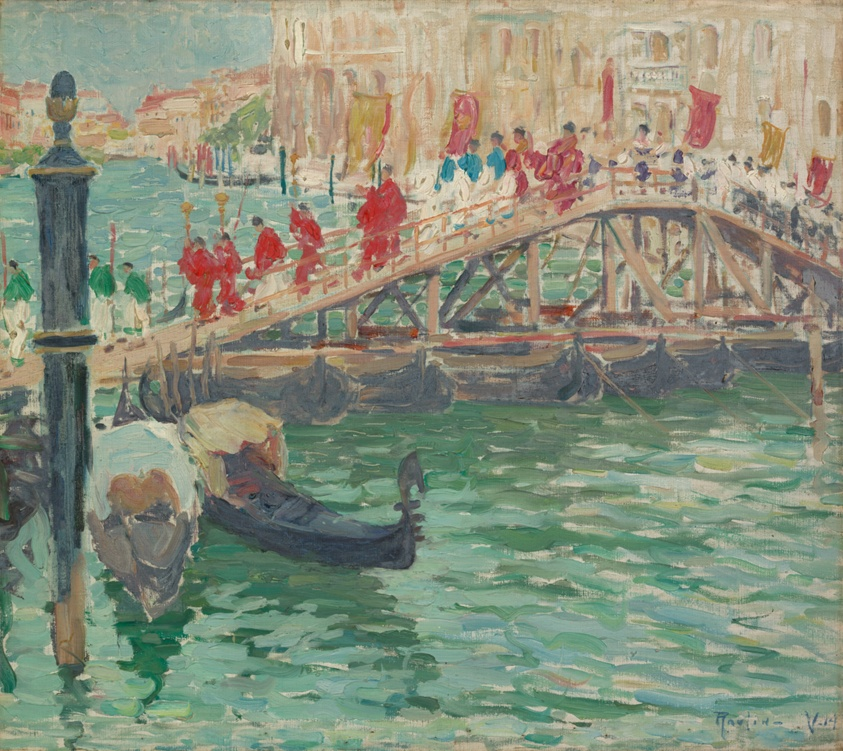
Grace Ravlin, Procession of the Redentore, Venice, oil on canvas, 1914, 23 x 25 inches

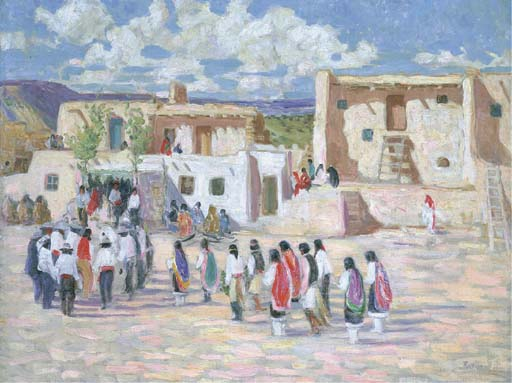
Grace Ravlin, Corn Dance, oil on canvas, 1916, 27 1/2 x 36 1/4 inches

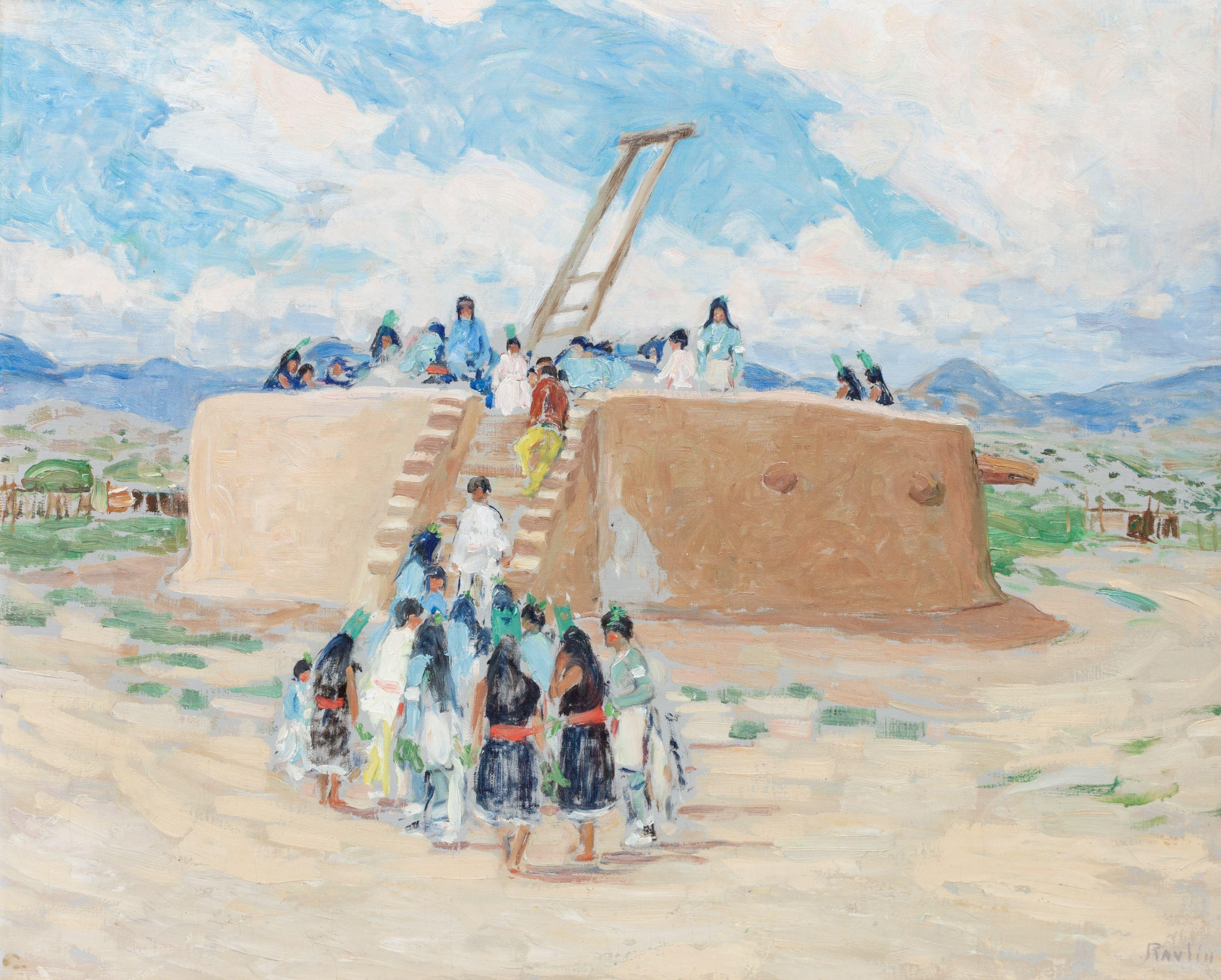
Grace Ravlin, Cochiti Corn Dancers, oil on canvas, 1916, 24 x 29 inches

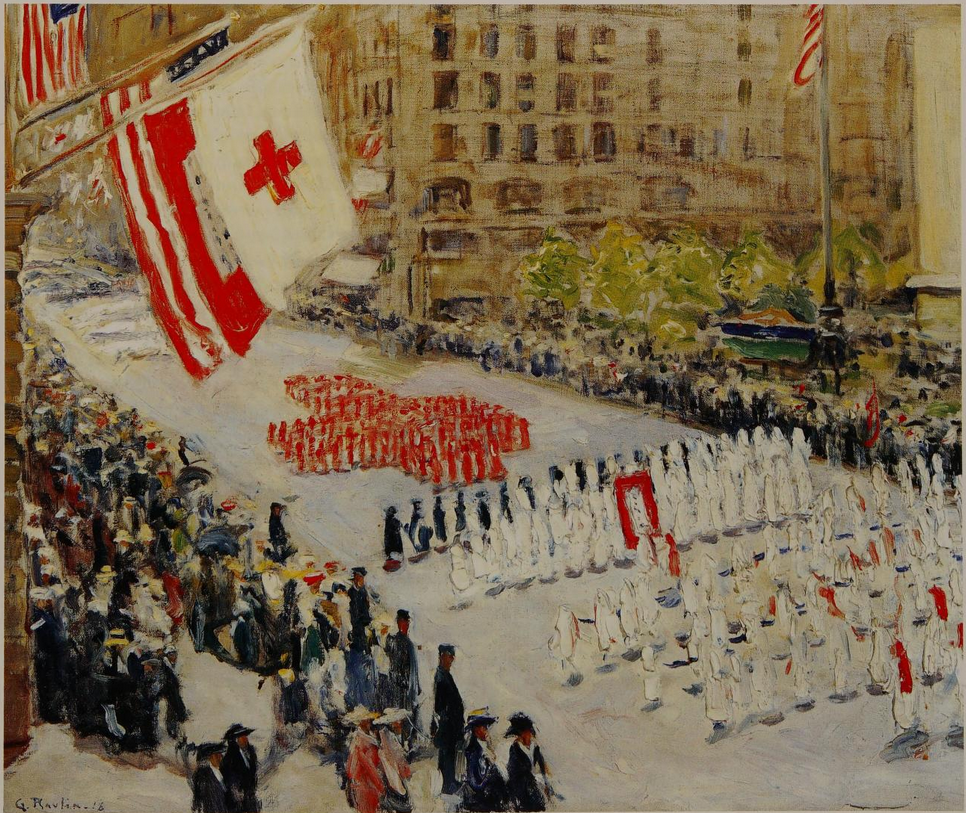
Grace Ravlin, Red Cross Parade, Fifth Avenue at 41st Street, oil on canvas, 1918, 15 1/4 x 30 inches

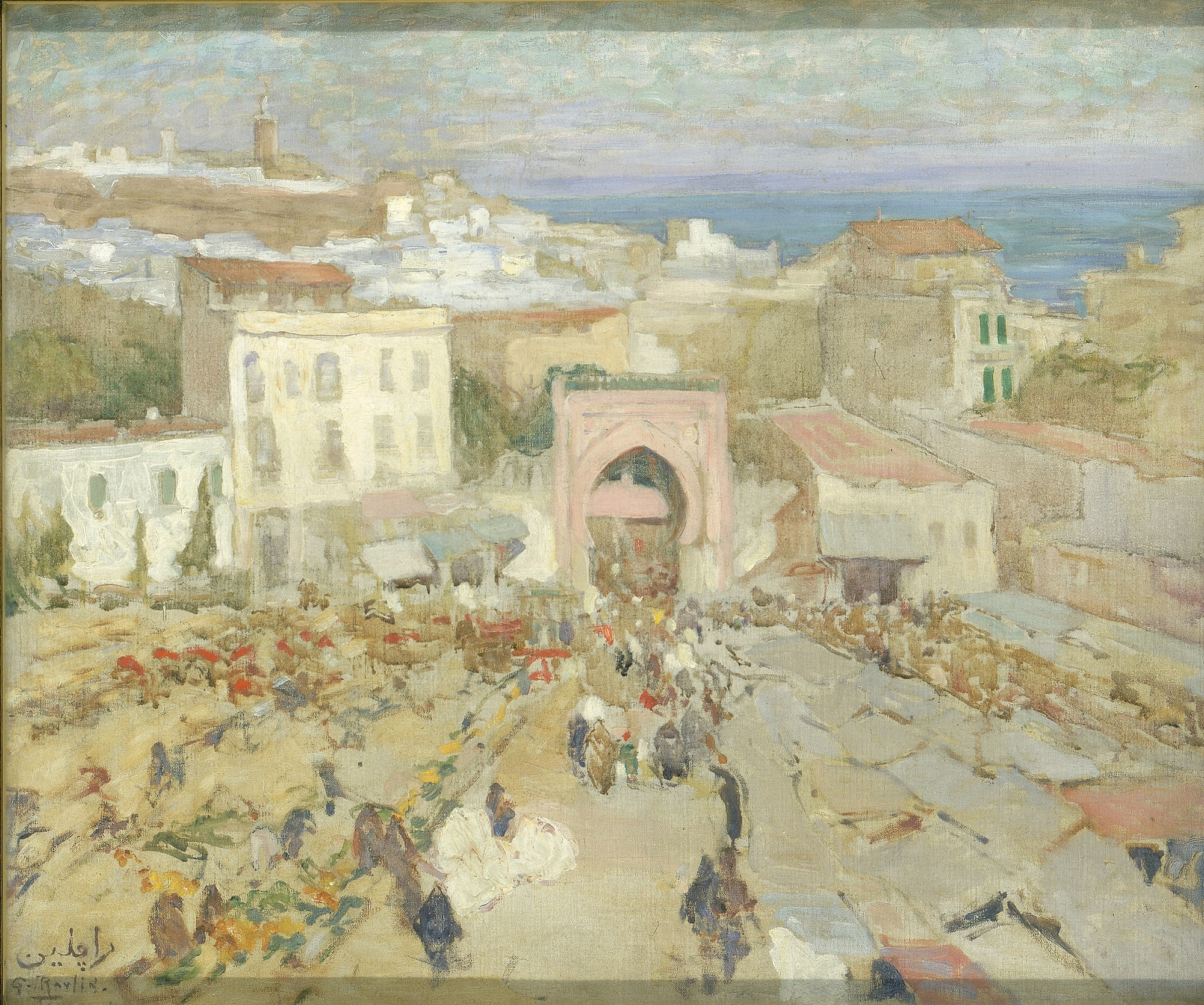
Grace Ravlin, Pink Gate Tangiers, Morocco, oil on linen, 1920, 23 3/4 x 28 7/8 inches

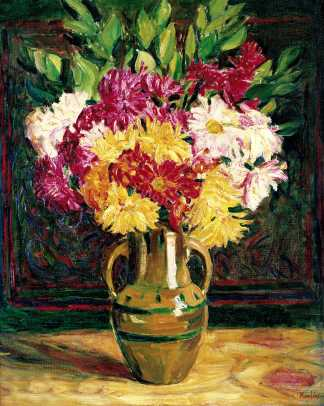
Grace Ravlin, Vase of Flowers, oil on canvas, 1920, 25 1/2 x 21 1/2 inches

=== Travels ===
Taking advice from her teachers, Ravlin took sail for France in August 1906, accompanied by an instructor from the Art Institute named Martha Susan Baker. She established a base in Paris and arranged with two French artists, Lucien Simon and René Ménard of the Cour Simon-Ménard, to review the work she produced while abroad. She rented a studio in Paris which she used as her base of operations during her frequent travels in Europe and North Africa. (Note: Sources do not give the address of her Paris studio. Indirect evidence suggests that it was in the building at the corner of rues Vavin and Bréa. The building contained artists' studios and had a famous art supplies shop on its first floor. The shop was owned by Lucien Lefebvre-Foinet who provided a valuable service for Ravlin in 1915.) In 1907 and 1908, Ravlin traveled to Venice, Belgium, and the Netherlands. She returned to the United States in 1908, seeking money to fund a new round of travel. She sold two paintings in a show at the Art Institute, took an office job, and waited for probate to be completed on a bequest from her recently deceased mother. She returned to France in 1909 and, continuing to keep Paris as her base, traveled mainly in Spain and Morocco between 1910 and 1913. After the outbreak of the First World War, she sought safety first in Venice and Genoa and then returned to the United States.

During 1914, she lived and worked in New York City and the following year made her base in Chicago from which she traveled in 1916 to New Mexico. During 1917 and 1918, she lived in New York and did little painting, and after the Armistice traveled once more to Paris. During 1919 and 1920, she traveled back and forth between Paris and towns in Tunisia and Morocco. A year later, a writer described her postwar travel in these words: "Lingering in Tangier, the metropolis of internationalism, and dividing her time between the French and the Spanish zones of Tunis and Morocco, she has become a sort of liaison artist, and is received with equal enthusiasm in Paris and in Barcelona." In the mid-1920s, Ravlin drew her trans-Atlantic travels to a close and settled in Manhattan. She made brief visits to New Mexico and Mexico City between 1921 and 1925. During the 1930s, she painted in Pittsburgh, Pennsylvania, and moved her home base from New York to Kaneville, where she lived for the rest of her life. A painting expedition to Gloucester, Massachusetts, in the late 1930s may have been her last stint of travel as a professional painter.

=== Exhibitions, awards, and sales ===
Within the United States, Ravlin exhibited at the Art Institute of Chicago, Pennsylvania Academy of the Fine Arts, Corcoran Gallery, National Academy of Design, Panama–Pacific International Exposition, and other museums and galleries. She exhibited in France at the Salon Nationale, Salon des Orientalistes, the Salon d'Automne, and elsewhere. She was given a solo exhibition at the Art Institute as well as solos in commercial galleries in Chicago, Paris, and Barcelona.

When Ravlin showed at the Art Institute's exhibition of works by Chicago artists in 1909, a critic singled out for praise a painting of hers called "The Seine". The critic said she executed the work "with skill and feelings" to capture "the mystic spirit of the river at night". She showed at the Salon de la Nationale between 1908 and 1914 and was accepted as an associate member in 1912. (Note: The American art press referred to the salons of the Société Nationale des Beaux-Arts as "Salon des Beaux Arts", "salon de la Nationale", "the Salon", "Salon of the Société Nationale", and the "New Salon".) A critic called attention to a "bright bit of true sunlight feeling" in a painting she showed at an exhibition held by a Parisian association of American and English women called the Trinity Lodge Art League in February 1911. Later that year, she participated in two exhibitions by invitation. The first, held by the Société des Peintres Orientalistes Français, took place at the Musée du Luxembourg in Paris. The second, held by an organization called Amis des Arts in Toulon, resulted in the award of a third-place medal. When she showed at the Salon de la Nationale in 1913, a critic singled out her landscapes of Tangiers for "very special praise", writing, "they are full of the atmosphere of the country and extremely well painted." Over the next two years, the French government bought a Tangiers street scene and three other Ravlin paintings to hang in public buildings including the Musée du Luxembourg in Paris.

On leaving Paris in 1914, Ravlin put her paintings in the care of a man who owned an art supplies shop in the building where she lived and stored her work. A year later, this man, Lucien Lefebvre-Foinet, submitted four of her paintings to the Panama–Pacific International Exposition in San Francisco. The exposition contained, as one source puts it, "one of the most ambitious art exhibitions ever presented in the United States". Then living in Chicago, Ravlin told a local reporter that she was surprised and delighted to read that the four paintings had been awarded a silver medal from the exposition's prize jury. She was particularly surprised, she said, because Lefevre-Foinet had taken it upon himself to send the paintings without telling her.

In 1914, Ravlin sold two pictures to a Chicago organization called the Civic Commission for the Encouragement of Local Art. Later that year, a group called Friends of American Art purchased a Ravlin painting for the collections of the Art Institute. Formed by the Art Institute in 1910, the group aimed to increase the museum's holdings of American paintings and sculpture. Ravlin's picture showed a religious procession crossing a temporary bridge in Venice. In discussing the purchase, a local critic said, "'Procession of the Redentore' is one of the best paintings Grace Ravlin has accomplished — and she has done other paintings worth much acclaim. The picture is stunningly colorful and each figure is a distinctive type. The fervid action in the procession is environed with verdure and secondary picturesque suggestions of 'habitations'."

When Ravlin showed paintings she had made in New Mexico at the 1917 edition of the Art Institute's annual exhibition of works by Chicago artists, the art press responded favorably. A critic for the Chicago Examiner described her work as "full of movement and life" and a critic for the Fine Arts Journal cited, "fine studies of Indian life snatched out of the heart of events with an artist's appreciation of native customs and tribal lore". Her contemporaneous solo at the galleries of Carson Pirie Scott & Company also drew favorable comment. In discussing the strengths of the paintings she made in Taos, a Chicago critic quoted a Parisian reviewer who said she had a deep understanding of the methods of Manet, adding, "All that comes from her brush is of a distinction I do not see elsewhere."

A 1917 review of Ravlin's paintings in an exhibition in Santa Fe called her a "delineator of intense life", and a review of her paintings in Los Angeles that year praised her paintings' composition, technique, and effectiveness. A year later, she won two prizes at the Art Institute's annual exhibition of works by Chicago artists, the Edward B. Butler Purchase Fund prize for a painting called "In the Navajo Country" and the Wentworth G. Field cash prize for "Indian Dance at Isleta". In 1919, the selection jury of the innovative Salon d'Automne included one of her paintings in its annual exhibition in Paris. The following year, she received a solo exhibition at Galerie Marcel Bersheim, a commercial gallery in Paris. When she was invited to participate in an exhibition at Galerías Layetanas in Barcelona, local critics praised her sensitivity to light and motion and said there was a good deal more to her art than the faithful representation of her subjects.

In 1922, the Art Institute awarded her the Charles S. Peterson purchase prize for a painting called "Street in Kairouan, Tunis". A year later she participated in a dual exhibition with Robert Henri at the Macbeth Gallery in New York. A critic for Art News praised Ravlin's work as "personal, individual, and animated", and another, in the Brooklyn Daily Eagle, saw in it a strong French influence.

Between the mid-1920s and mid-1930s Ravlin showed infrequently. Her work appeared in an exhibition at Rockford College in Illinois in 1927, in the Century of Progress Exhibition of Paintings & Sculpture at the Art Institute in the winter of 1933–1934, and in the Los Angeles Museum of History, Science, and Art in 1934. She tapered off her travel and painting in the mid-1930s while continuing to show infrequently. Among her last exhibitions to be mentioned in the art press were a show at Pittsburgh's Wunderly Gallery in 1936, an appearance in the Marshall Field Galleries of Chicago in 1937, and at least one exhibition at Grand Central Galleries in New York City early in the 1940s.

== Style and technique ==
Although she made some watercolor paintings, Ravlin mainly worked in oil on canvas, linen, board, or paper. She preferred painting outdoors, En plein air, using unposed subjects in natural settings. The became best known for group scenes — festivals, ceremonies, processions, dances, parades, street scenes, and gatherings of ordinary people. Early in her career, Ravlin shared with other members of the Peintres Orientalistes Français a preference for painting colorful, brilliantly sunlit scenes of people and places in Morocco and other North African locales. The paintings she made in Europe, the American southwest, and Mexico had much in common with these early works. Late in her career, a curator summarized these stylistic tendencies. "Miss Ravlin's gift", the curator wrote, "is her ability to transfer to the canvas the brilliancy of the sunlit landscape, the flash of color, and the spontaneous movement of the crowds." The critic added that French reviewers had noted her "freshness and limpidness of her color and her exactness of perception in the subtle relations of colors" and said they concluded that her work had "nothing to do with the studio", but constituted a direct "transference from nature" accompanied by the "clean color" and "expression of movement" that were characteristic of the modernists.

Critics saw a similar feeling for color arrangement in Ravlin's still lifes. In 1917, a critic noted her "stunningly modern-school still life studies, bold and daring, colorful and decorative" and added, that her still lifes were "perfectly consistent with the spontaneous quality of infinite lightness and joyousness that characterize everything from the brush of this intrepid and venturesome young woman".

In 1924, in discussing the distinctiveness of Ravlin's style, a critic for Art News called her "an artist with an intensely personal viewpoint, a palette all her own, and with nothing about her work to arouse reminiscences of the influence of any other painter, although modern French traditions are in the background of her spirited colorful works." Writing at the same time, another critic noted in her paintings "a certain language, a dry staccato touch which is frequently used in France."

== Personal life and family ==
Before her birth, Ravlin's father, Needham N. Ravlin, had become one of Kaneville's largest landowners and most prominent citizens. He was the town's first postmaster and its township supervisor, town clerk, trustee, and school director. In 1868, he was elected to the state's legislature. He and Ravlin's mother, Frances (West) Ravlin married in 1849 and had five children of whom Ravlin was the youngest.

While living in Kaneville before she became a professional artist, Ravlin played a harp guitar in a local women's group called the Carmen Symphony Club.

In addition to the money she received from selling her paintings, Ravlin supported her professional career using savings from jobs she held intermittently, from bequests on the death of her parents, and from contributions she received from her family.

In 1916, while living in New York City, she became a Red Cross volunteer, and, in 1918, a began to train as a nurse. After the armistice, she served for two years as a nurse's aide in Paris.

Ravlin died on September 25, 1956.

== See also ==
- List of Orientalist artists
- Orientalism
