= Josh Cassidy =

Canadian wheelchair racer

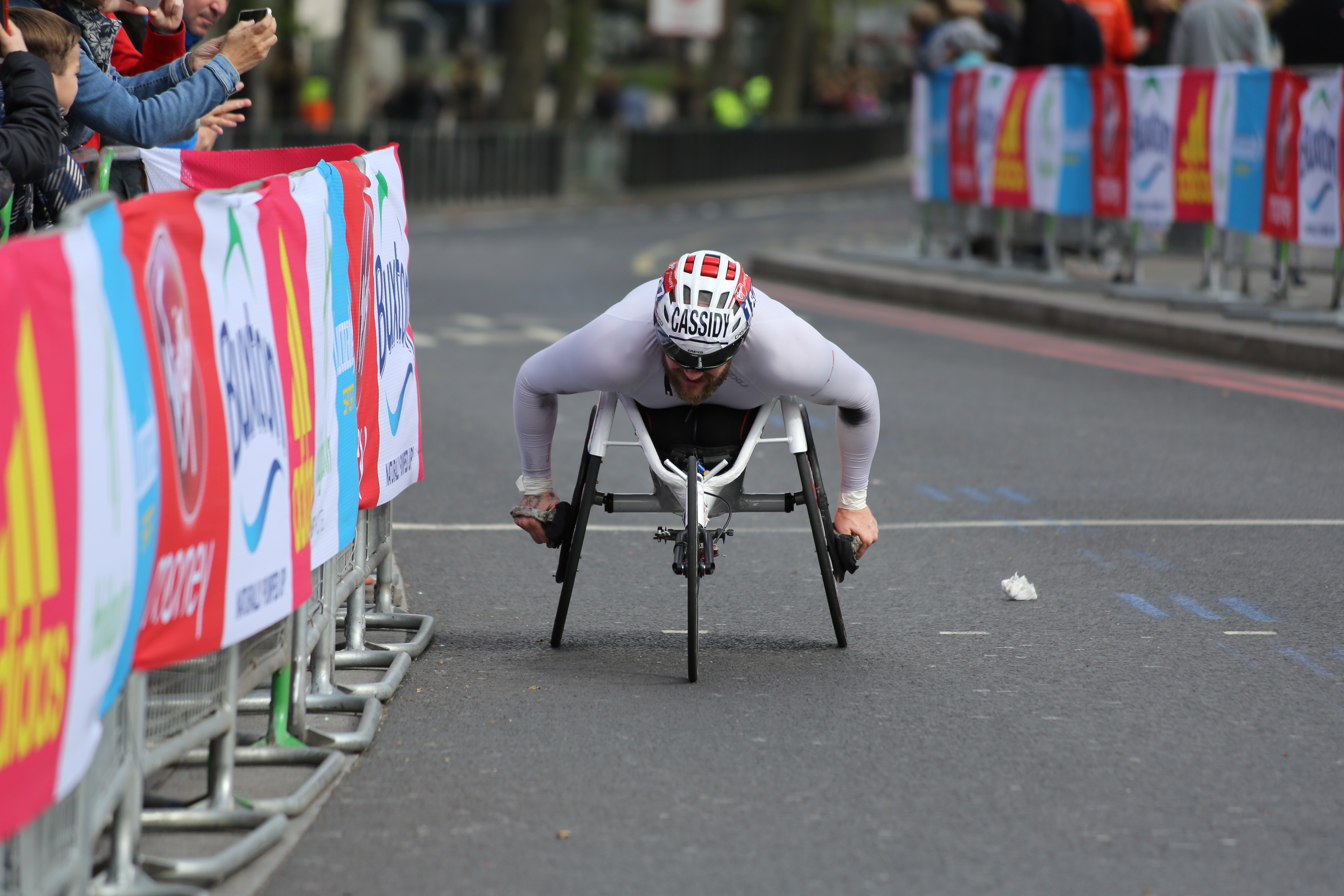
- Cassidy at the 2017 London Marathon

Personal information
- Born: 15 November 1984 (age 41) Ottawa, Ontario, Canada
- Height: 170 cm (5 ft 7 in)

Sport
- Disability: Legs are partially paralyzed as a result of spinal cord damage from neuroblastoma cancer at birth.
Medal record
Athletics
Parapan American Games
Silver medal – second place	2015 Toronto	800 m T54
Silver medal – second place	2015 Toronto	1500 m T54
Silver medal – second place	2015 Toronto	5000 m T54
Commonwealth Games
Bronze medal – third place	2010 Delhi	1500m T54

Josh Cassidy (born November 15, 1984, in Ottawa, Ontario) is a Canadian Paralympic wheelchair racer, motivational speaker, artist, and actor.

He is a 31 time Canadian Champion competing in the middle to long distance events. He has been National Champion and held National records at times throughout his career in the 800m, 1500m, 5000m, 10,000m and Marathon.

In 2005, he was carded as a Canadian National Team athlete, and competed in his first world championships in 2006 in Assen, Netherlands.

Cassidy represented Canada at the 2008 Summer Paralympics, finishing 10th in the 5000m, 12th in the 1500m, and 17th in the 800m.

In 2010, Cassidy won the 2010 London Marathon with a time of 1:35:21 seconds. In 2012, he won the 2012 Boston Marathon wheelchair race with a time of 1:18:25, which at the time became the fastest wheelchair marathon time ever recorded, though didn't count as a world record due to the Boston Marathon course being ineligible for world records. His record stood for five years until broken by Marcel Hug of Switzerland in 2017.

At the 2012 Summer Paralympics, Cassidy competed whilst fighting a bacteria infection. He placed 12th in the marathon, 20th in the 5000m, 10th in the 1500m. He overcame a crash in the 800m, and still placed 5th.

He won the Chicago Marathon in 2012.

In 2013 Cassidy won Bronze in the 10,000m at the World Championships in Lyon, France.

He has won the Los Angeles Marathon twice. In 2019 he overcame the odds when his racing chair had snapped in half the day before, but he managed to get a friend to fly a spare racer to him that night, hours before the race. He won LA Marathon again in 2023.

Cassidy won the Sydney Marathon in 2023 and 2024.

Cassidy joined the Canadian team for the 2022 Commonwealth Games in Birmingham, and was named as co-flagbearer for the opening ceremony alongside weightlifter Maude Charron. He came in 4th in the men's T54 marathon.

In 2026 Cassidy won the 2026 BOLDERBoulder Pro Men's Wheelchair with a time of 23:36

== Personal life ==
Josh Cassidy was born in Ottawa on November 15, 1984. He was diagnosed with neuroblastoma cancer in the spine and abdomen weeks after birth. He was given a very low chance of survival but was declared cancer-free after 5 years of remission, but it left his legs partially paralyzed. He lived across Canada during his father's career in the military as a fighter pilot, where they resided at several base locations. When Josh was nine, his family settled on a farm in Bruce County, Ontario. Josh is the oldest of ten children.

He has graduated from Sheridan College with a Bachelor of Applied Arts in Illustration.
