= Lindsey Anderson =

American steeplechase runner (born 1985)

Personal information
- Nationality: American
- Born: Lindsey Olson; 23 May 1985 (age 41) Payson, Utah
- Height: 1.63 m (5 ft 4 in)
- Weight: 52 kg (115 lb)

Sport
- Sport: Athletics
- Event: Steeplechase
- College team: Weber State Wildcats
- Turned pro: 2007
- Coached by: Paul Pilkington

Achievements and titles
- Personal best: 3000 m steeplechase: 9:30.75 (2008)

Lindsey Anderson (born May 23, 1985 in Payson, Utah) is an American middle distance and steeplechase runner. She is a two-time NCAA All-American, a four-time school record holder at Weber State University, and a six-time Big Sky Conference senior champion. She also set a personal best time of 9:30.75 in the 3,000 meter steeplechase by placing second at the 2008 U.S. Olympic Trials in Eugene, Oregon, which guaranteed her a qualifying place for the Olympics. University of Missouri women cross country head coach

== Morgan High School ==
Anderson, a native of Morgan, Utah, started out her athletic career as a middle-distance runner, since she was in seventh grade. Anderson attended Morgan High School, where she had won five state track and cross-country titles, and held starting positions on both the girls' soccer and basketball teams. Coming out of high school, she was offered a full scholarship to study at Weber State University in Ogden, Utah.

== Weber State University ==
While attending the University, Anderson continued to develop into what she called "a pretty, good college runner" in her first two years, before she worked with 1994 Los Angeles marathon champion Paul Pilkington in 2005. Under her coach's direction, Anderson stood out to be an Olympic hopeful, and eventually reached the summit of her career with a runner-up finish in the steeplechase at the 2007 NCAA Outdoor Championships, and a third-place finish at the U.S. Outdoor Championships. Additionally, she earned NCAA All-American honors twice, held four school records in middle-distance running, and won five Big Sky Conference championship titles under the senior division, and won team MVP for the season. Also during Anderson’s senior year of cross country, she was ranked number one in the Big Sky Conference but got sick with bronchitis and received a fourth-place finish in the 5K with a time of 18:09.3. .

== Professional and International Racing ==
In 2008, Anderson posted a career best time of 9:30.75 in the women's steeplechase at the U.S. Olympic Trials in Eugene, Oregon. Finishing second overall in the event, she clinched a spot on the United States team for the Olympics.

At the 2008 Summer Olympics in Beijing, Anderson competed in the first ever women's 3000 m steeplechase, along with her teammates Jennifer Barringer and Anna Willard. She ran in the first heat against sixteen other athletes, including Tunisia's Habiba Ghribi, and Russia's Gulnara Galkina-Samitova, both of whom were top medal contenders in this event. She finished the race in eighth place by five seconds ahead of Ethiopia's Mekdes Bekele, outside her personal best time of 9:36.81. Anderson, however, failed to advance into the final, as she placed twenty-fourth overall, and was ranked below four mandatory slots for the next round. Also, Anderson is usually the smallest competitor in the race, standing at only five foot four inches. However, she has an advantage in steeplechase because she was a jumper.4

Lindsey Anderson placed 12th and finished in 2:36:51 – paced the first half of the 2018 Chicago Marathon in 1:18:16 to qualify for United States Olympic Trials in the 2020 Trials in Atlanta.

Lindsey Anderson placed 6th and finished in 2:34:45 – paced the first half of the 2019 Los Angeles Marathon in 1:18:26 to qualify for United States Olympic Marathon Trials in the 2020 Trials in Atlanta.

== Personal life ==
Formerly Lindsey Olson, she is married to Mark Anderson who is also a runner. 2 They had their first child, a girl in October 2011. They had their second child, a boy in January 2015. Also, Anderson is usually the smallest competitor in the race, standing at only five foot four inches. However, she has an advantage in steeplechase because she was a jumper. All throughout Lindsey’s running career she was rarely number one, and suffered from a “fear of failure”. She was only offered two scholarships for running, and both were from Utah

== Coaching career ==
Coach Anderson coached at Weber State University from 2007 through 2014. Coach Lindsey Anderson accepted an offer at California State University Bakersfield in July 2014

"Marcia Mansur-Wentworth thinks she is going to be a great role model for our young women and young men and I am just thrilled that she wants to help us.” Anderson brings several years of coaching experience to Bakersfield after being an assistant coach for her alma mater, Weber State. She also competed for Oiselle, a women's running company that sponsors several elite female runners like Kara Goucher and Lauren Fleshman."

Coach Anderson led the College of Southern Idaho Golden Eagles cross country and track and field men and women as head coach 2018 – 2022. Anderson led CSI's women's team to the 2021 NJCAA Division I National Cross Country Championship --- The first in school history. During her five seasons at CSI, both the men's and women's cross country teams placed in the top 10 in the nation every season.

Coach Anderson led the Missouri Tigers cross country and track and field men and women as head coach 2022 – 2023.

Lindsey Anderson returns to Weber State as assistant coach in July 2023. She is a Big Sky Conference 25 Greatest Female Athletes of all time in 2014 and was inducted into the Weber State Athletics Hall of Fame in 2017.
