= Cortland Township, DeKalb County, Illinois =

Cortland Township
- Township
- Location in DeKalb County

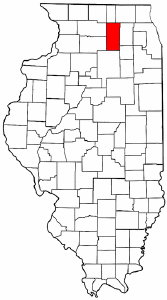
- DeKalb County's location in Illinois
- Coordinates: 41°56′00″N 88°39′00″W
- Country: United States
- State: Illinois
- County: DeKalb
- Established: February 1, 1865

Area
  - Total: 35.26 sq mi (91.3 km^{2})
  - Land: 35.03 sq mi (90.7 km^{2})
  - Water: 0.24 sq mi (0.62 km^{2}) 0.67%
- Elevation: 876 ft (267 m)

Population (2020)
  - Total: 11,244
  - Density: 321.0/sq mi (123.9/km^{2})
- Time zone: UTC-6 (CST)
  - Summer (DST): UTC-5 (CDT)
- ZIP codes: 60112, 60115, 60151, 60178
- FIPS code: 17-037-16483
- Website: cortlandtownship.com

Cortland Township is one of nineteen townships in DeKalb County, Illinois, USA. As of the 2020 census, its population was 11,244 and it contained 4,357 housing units. Cortland Township was originally named Richland Township, but was renamed to Pampas Township on November 20, 1850; it was renamed to Cortland Township on February 1, 1865.

== Geography ==
According to the 2021 census gazetteer files, Cortland Township has a total area of 35.26 square miles (91.32 km^{2}), of which 35.03 square miles (90.73 km^{2}) (or 99.33%) is land and 0.24 square miles (0.62 km^{2}) (or 0.67%) is water.

=== Cities, towns, villages ===
- Cortland
- Dekalb (east edge)
- Maple Park (partial)
- Sycamore (partial)

=== Cemeteries ===
- Mount Rest
- Mount Pleasant
- Ohio Grove

=== Airports and landing strips ===
- DeKalb Taylor Municipal Airport
- Ruder Airport

== Demographics ==
As of the 2020 census there were 11,244 people, 4,023 households, and 2,822 families residing in the township. The population density was 318.85 inhabitants per square mile (123.11/km^{2}). There were 4,357 housing units at an average density of 123.55 per square mile (47.70/km^{2}). The racial makeup of the township was 80.72% White, 4.75% African American, 0.36% Native American, 1.80% Asian, 0.04% Pacific Islander, 3.73% from other races, and 8.60% from two or more races. Hispanic or Latino of any race were 11.71% of the population.

There were 4,023 households, out of which 35.70% had children under the age of 18 living with them, 53.00% were married couples living together, 12.08% had a female householder with no spouse present, and 29.85% were non-families. 20.60% of all households were made up of individuals, and 8.00% had someone living alone who was 65 years of age or older. The average household size was 2.81 and the average family size was 3.28.

The township's age distribution consisted of 25.2% under the age of 18, 10.8% from 18 to 24, 28.9% from 25 to 44, 22.8% from 45 to 64, and 12.3% who were 65 years of age or older. The median age was 34.1 years. For every 100 females, there were 93.1 males. For every 100 females age 18 and over, there were 89.8 males.

The median income for a household in the township was $73,388, and the median income for a family was $93,278. Males had a median income of $51,148 versus $30,242 for females. The per capita income for the township was $32,753. About 4.7% of families and 7.6% of the population were below the poverty line, including 8.3% of those under age 18 and 4.6% of those age 65 or over.

Enter a new FIPS Code

Historical population
Census	Pop.	Note	%±
1930	1,078		—
1940	1,191		10.5%
1950	1,667		40.0%
1960	2,403		44.2%
1970	3,037		26.4%
1980	4,297		41.5%
1990	4,637		7.9%
2000	6,986		50.7%
2010	10,698		53.1%
2020	11,244		5.1%
US Decennial Census

== School districts ==
- DeKalb Community Unit School District 428
- Kaneland Community Unit School District 302
- Sycamore Community Unit School District 427

== Political districts ==
- Illinois's 14th congressional district
- State House District 70
- State Senate District 35
