= Squaw Grove Township, DeKalb County, Illinois =

Squaw Grove Township
- Township
- Location in DeKalb County

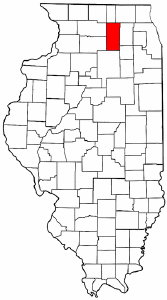
- DeKalb County's location in Illinois
- Coordinates: 41°45′29″N 88°39′22″W
- Country: United States
- State: Illinois
- County: DeKalb
- Established: November 6, 1849

Area
  - Total: 35.15 sq mi (91.0 km^{2})
  - Land: 34.99 sq mi (90.6 km^{2})
  - Water: 0.17 sq mi (0.44 km^{2}) 0.47%
- Elevation: 751 ft (229 m)

Population (2020)
  - Total: 2,717
  - Density: 77.65/sq mi (29.98/km^{2})
- Time zone: UTC-6 (CST)
  - Summer (DST): UTC-5 (CDT)
- ZIP codes: 60119, 60511, 60520, 60548, 60552
- FIPS code: 17-037-72182
- Website: www.squawgrovetownshipil.org

Squaw Grove Township is one of 19 townships in DeKalb County, Illinois, USA. As of the 2020 census, its population was 2,717 and it contained 1,118 housing units.

== Geography ==
According to the 2021 census gazetteer files, Squaw Grove Township has a total area of 35.15 square miles (91.04 km^{2}), of which 34.99 square miles (90.62 km^{2}) (or 99.53%) is land and 0.17 square miles (0.44 km^{2}) (or 0.47%) is water.

=== Cities, towns, villages ===
- Hinckley

Cemeteries

- Greenwood https://www.greenwoodcemeteryhinckleyil.org
- Immanuel Lutheran
- Miller

=== Airports and landing strips ===
- Ballek Landing Area
- Hinckley Airport

== Demographics ==
As of the 2020 census there were 2,717 people, 1,070 households, and 715 families residing in the township. The population density was 77.29 inhabitants per square mile (29.84/km^{2}). There were 1,118 housing units at an average density of 31.80 per square mile (12.28/km^{2}). The racial makeup of the township was 90.47% White, 0.48% African American, 0.07% Native American, 0.77% Asian, 0.11% Pacific Islander, 1.55% from other races, and 6.55% from two or more races. Hispanic or Latino of any race were 7.07% of the population.

There were 1,070 households, out of which 32.40% had children under the age of 18 living with them, 50.84% were married couples living together, 10.84% had a female householder with no spouse present, and 33.18% were non-families. 25.60% of all households were made up of individuals, and 9.00% had someone living alone who was 65 years of age or older. The average household size was 2.60 and the average family size was 3.18.

The township's age distribution consisted of 25.3% under the age of 18, 12.7% from 18 to 24, 22% from 25 to 44, 26.9% from 45 to 64, and 13.2% who were 65 years of age or older. The median age was 37.6 years. For every 100 females, there were 100.2 males. For every 100 females age 18 and over, there were 109.4 males.

The median income for a household in the township was $74,706, and the median income for a family was $92,417. Males had a median income of $61,892 versus $33,036 for females. The per capita income for the township was $35,752. About 3.8% of families and 7.0% of the population were below the poverty line, including 4.1% of those under age 18 and 4.6% of those age 65 or over.

Historical population
Census	Pop.	Note	%±
1930	1,331		—
1940	1,338		0.5%
1950	1,440		7.6%
1960	1,581		9.8%
1970	1,770		12.0%
1980	2,175		22.9%
1990	2,387		9.7%
2000	2,698		13.0%
2010	2,802		3.9%
2020	2,717		−3.0%
US Decennial Census

== School districts ==
- Hinckley-Big Rock Community Unit School District 429
- Indian Creek Community Unit District 425
- Sandwich Community Unit School District 430

== Political districts ==
- Illinois's 14th congressional district
- State House District 70
- State Senate District 35
