= Virgil, Illinois =

- Village
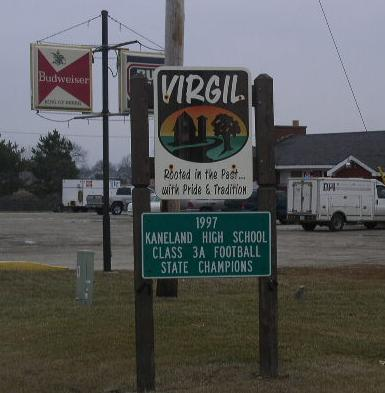
- Welcome sign on Illinois Route 64
- Motto: "Rooted in the Past with Pride & Tradition"
- Location of Virgil in Kane County, Illinois

- Location of Illinois in the United States
- Coordinates: 41°57′21″N 88°31′44″W
- Country: United States
- State: Illinois
- County: Kane
- Township: Virgil
- Settled: 1836
- Incorporated: 1990

Government
  - Type: Mayor–council
  - Village President: Jamie LeBlanc

Area
  - Total: 2.18 sq mi (5.65 km^{2})
  - Land: 2.18 sq mi (5.65 km^{2})
  - Water: 0 sq mi (0.00 km^{2})
- Elevation: 866 ft (264 m)

Population (2020)
  - Total: 289
  - Density: 132.4/sq mi (51.11/km^{2})
- Time zone: UTC-6 (CST)
  - Summer (DST): UTC-5 (CDT)
- ZIP Code(s): 60151, 60182
- Area codes: 630/331
- FIPS code: 17-78175
- GNIS feature ID: 2400074
- Wikimedia Commons: Virgil, Illinois
- Website: www.villageofvirgil.gov

Virgil is a village in Virgil Township, Kane County, Illinois, United States. It was incorporated on November 6, 1990. The population was 289 at the 2020 census.

== History ==
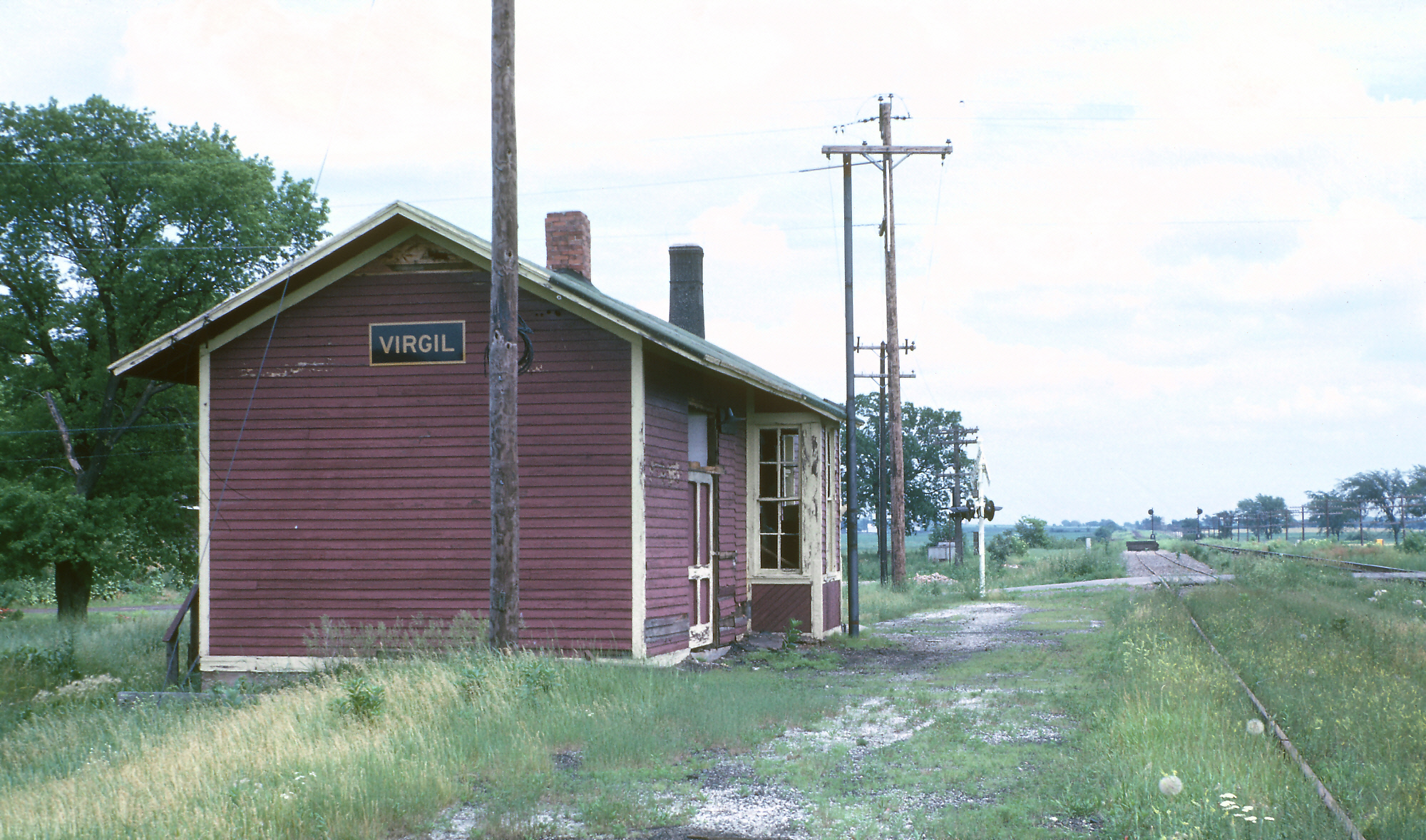
Virgil's railroad station, 1962

Virgil was the site of the 2010 Illinois earthquake's epicenter in the early morning hours of February 10.

== Geography ==
Virgil is located in western Kane County. Illinois Route 64 passes through the village center, leading east 12 miles (19 km) to St. Charles and west 8 miles (13 km) to Sycamore.

According to the 2021 census gazetteer files, Virgil has a total area of 2.18 square miles (5.65 km^{2}), all land.

== Demographics ==
Historical population
Census	Pop.	Note	%±
2000	266		—
2010	329		23.7%
2020	289		−12.2%
U.S. Decennial Census

=== 2020 census ===
Virgil village, Illinois – Racial and ethnic composition Note: the US Census treats Hispanic/Latino as an ethnic category. This table excludes Latinos from the racial categories and assigns them to a separate category. Hispanics/Latinos may be of any race.
Race / Ethnicity (NH = Non-Hispanic)	Pop 2000	Pop 2010	Pop 2020	% 2000	% 2010	% 2020
White alone (NH)	255	302	257	95.86%	91.79%	88.93%
Black or African American alone (NH)	3	6	5	1.13%	1.82%	1.73%
Native American or Alaska Native alone (NH)	0	2	3	0.00%	0.61%	1.04%
Asian alone (NH)	1	5	0	0.38%	1.52%	0.00%
Native Hawaiian or Pacific Islander alone (NH)	0	0	0	0.00%	0.00%	0.00%
Other race alone (NH)	0	0	0	0.00%	0.00%	0.00%
Mixed race or Multiracial (NH)	2	4	4	0.75%	1.22%	1.38%
Hispanic or Latino (any race)	5	10	20	1.88%	3.04%	6.92%
Total	266	329	289	100.00%	100.00%	100.00%

As of the 2020 census there were 289 people, 132 households, and 113 families residing in the village. The population density was 132.39 inhabitants per square mile (51.12/km^{2}). There were 119 housing units at an average density of 54.51 per square mile (21.05/km^{2}). The racial makeup of the village was 90.31% White, 1.73% African American, 1.04% Native American, 0.35% Asian, 0.00% Pacific Islander, 3.11% from other races, and 3.46% from two or more races. Hispanic or Latino of any race were 6.92% of the population.

There were 132 households, out of which 35.6% had children under the age of 18 living with them, 63.64% were married couples living together, 16.67% had a female householder with no husband present, and 14.39% were non-families. 12.12% of all households were made up of individuals, and 6.06% had someone living alone who was 65 years of age or older. The average household size was 3.39 and the average family size was 3.15.

The village's age distribution consisted of 22.6% under the age of 18, 9.0% from 18 to 24, 24.2% from 25 to 44, 28.1% from 45 to 64, and 16.2% who were 65 years of age or older. The median age was 41.9 years. For every 100 females, there were 135.2 males. For every 100 females age 18 and over, there were 120.3 males.

The median income for a household in the village was $83,333, and the median income for a family was $90,417. Males had a median income of $45,096 versus $43,333 for females. The per capita income for the village was $33,216. About 3.5% of families and 4.0% of the population were below the poverty line, including 1.1% of those under age 18 and 0.0% of those age 65 or over.

== See also ==
- List of towns and villages in Illinois
