= Antonio Rao =

Italian marathon runner

Antonio Rao (born 1933) is an Italian nanogenarian marathon runner. He broke the 90-94 men's world record at the Paris Marathon in 2023.
