= Kaneville, Illinois =

- Village
- Motto: Where small town values grow strong
- Location of Kaneville in Kane County, Illinois

- Location of Illinois in the United States
- Coordinates: 41°50′00″N 88°31′18″W
- Country: United States
- State: Illinois
- County: Kane
- Township: Kaneville

Government
  - Village President: David Kovach

Area
  - Total: 0.29 sq mi (0.74 km^{2})
  - Land: 0.29 sq mi (0.74 km^{2})
  - Water: 0 sq mi (0.00 km^{2})
- Elevation: 784 ft (239 m)

Population
  - Total: 452
  - Density: 1,585.8/sq mi (612.28/km^{2})
- Time zone: UTC-6 (CST)
  - Summer (DST): UTC-5 (CDT)
- ZIP Code(s): 60144
- Area code: 630
- FIPS code: 17-38895
- GNIS feature ID: 2398325
- Wikimedia Commons: Kaneville, Illinois
- Website: villageofkaneville.com

Kaneville is a village in southwestern Kane County, Illinois, United States. The village had a population of 452 at the 2020 census. Kaneville is part of the Chicago metropolitan area.

== History ==
The village was originally called "Royalton", but this was found to be taken by another settlement. The name was then changed to "Kaneville", in reference to Elias Kane.

Kaneville was incorporated in November 2006, and the first elected officials were chosen in elections held on April 17, 2007.

== Geography ==
Kaneville is in southwestern Kane County, in the southeast part of Kaneville Township. It is 12 miles (19 km) northwest of Aurora and 48 miles (77 km) west of the Chicago Loop.

According to the 2021 census gazetteer files, Kaneville has a total area of 0.29 square miles (0.75 km^{2}), all land.

== Demographics ==
Historical population
Census	Pop.	Note	%±
2010	484		—
2020	452		−6.6%
U.S. Decennial Census

Kaneville village, Illinois – Racial and ethnic composition Note: the US Census treats Hispanic/Latino as an ethnic category. This table excludes Latinos from the racial categories and assigns them to a separate category. Hispanics/Latinos may be of any race.
Race / Ethnicity (NH = Non-Hispanic)	Pop 2010	Pop 2020	% 2010	% 2020
White alone (NH)	454	386	93.80%	85.40%
Black or African American alone (NH)	0	2	0.00%	0.44%
Native American or Alaska Native alone (NH)	0	1	0.00%	0.22%
Asian alone (NH)	1	8	0.21%	1.77%
Native Hawaiian or Pacific Islander alone (NH)	0	0	0.00%	0.00%
Other race alone (NH)	0	4	0.00%	0.88%
Mixed race or Multiracial (NH)	0	16	0.00%	3.54%
Hispanic or Latino (any race)	29	35	5.99%	7.74%
Total	484	452	100.00%	100.00%

As of the 2020 census there were 452 people, 225 households, and 166 families residing in the village. The population density was 1,585.96 inhabitants per square mile (612.34/km^{2}). There were 194 housing units at an average density of 680.70 per square mile (262.82/km^{2}). The racial makeup of the village was 88.05% White, 0.44% African American, 0.22% Native American, 1.77% Asian, 0.00% Pacific Islander, 1.55% from other races, and 7.96% from two or more races. Hispanic or Latino of any race were 7.74% of the population.

There were 225 households, out of which 18.7% had children under the age of 18 living with them, 51.56% were married couples living together, 11.11% had a female householder with no husband present, and 26.22% were non-families. 23.56% of all households were made up of individuals, and 5.33% had someone living alone who was 65 years of age or older. The average household size was 2.66 and the average family size was 2.30.

The village's age distribution consisted of 13.1% under the age of 18, 7.1% from 18 to 24, 17.9% from 25 to 44, 34.8% from 45 to 64, and 27.2% who were 65 years of age or older. The median age was 53.2 years. For every 100 females, there were 110.6 males. For every 100 females age 18 and over, there were 112.3 males.

The median income for a household in the village was $64,688, and the median income for a family was $70,179. Males had a median income of $50,625 versus $26,944 for females. The per capita income for the village was $35,175. About 3.0% of families and 2.9% of the population were below the poverty line, including 5.9% of those under age 18 and 3.5% of those age 65 or over.

== Notable people ==
- Grace Ravlin, artist
