= Kaneland Community Unit School District 302 =

School district in Maple Park, Illinois, USA

Address
- 47W326 Keslinger Road Maple Park, Illinois, 60151; United States

District information
- Type: Public
- Grades: PreK–12
- NCES District ID: 1724480

Students and staff
- Students: 4,092

Other information
- Website: www.kaneland.org

Kaneland Community Unit School District 302 (D302) is a school district headquartered in Maple Park, Illinois. It is within southwest Kane County. It was established through consolidation of existing school districts on July 1, 1948. The area of the district is 140 square miles (360 km^{2}) and has all or portions of Maple Park, Aurora, Cortland, Elburn, Kaneville, Montgomery, North Aurora, Sugar Grove, and Virgil.

== Schools ==
Secondary

- Kaneland High School
- Harter Middle School

Primary

- Blackberry Creek Elementary School
- McDole Elementary School
- John Shields Elementary School
- John Stewart Elementary School
