= Los Angeles Marathon =

Annual race in the United States

- Date: February/March
- Location: Los Angeles, California, U.S.
- Event type: Road
- Distance: Marathon, 26.219 mi (42.195 km)
- Established: 1986 (40 years ago) (current era)
- Course records: Men: 2:06:35; Markos Geneti (2011); Women: 2:25:10; Lidiya Grigoryeva (2006)
- Website: lamarathon.com

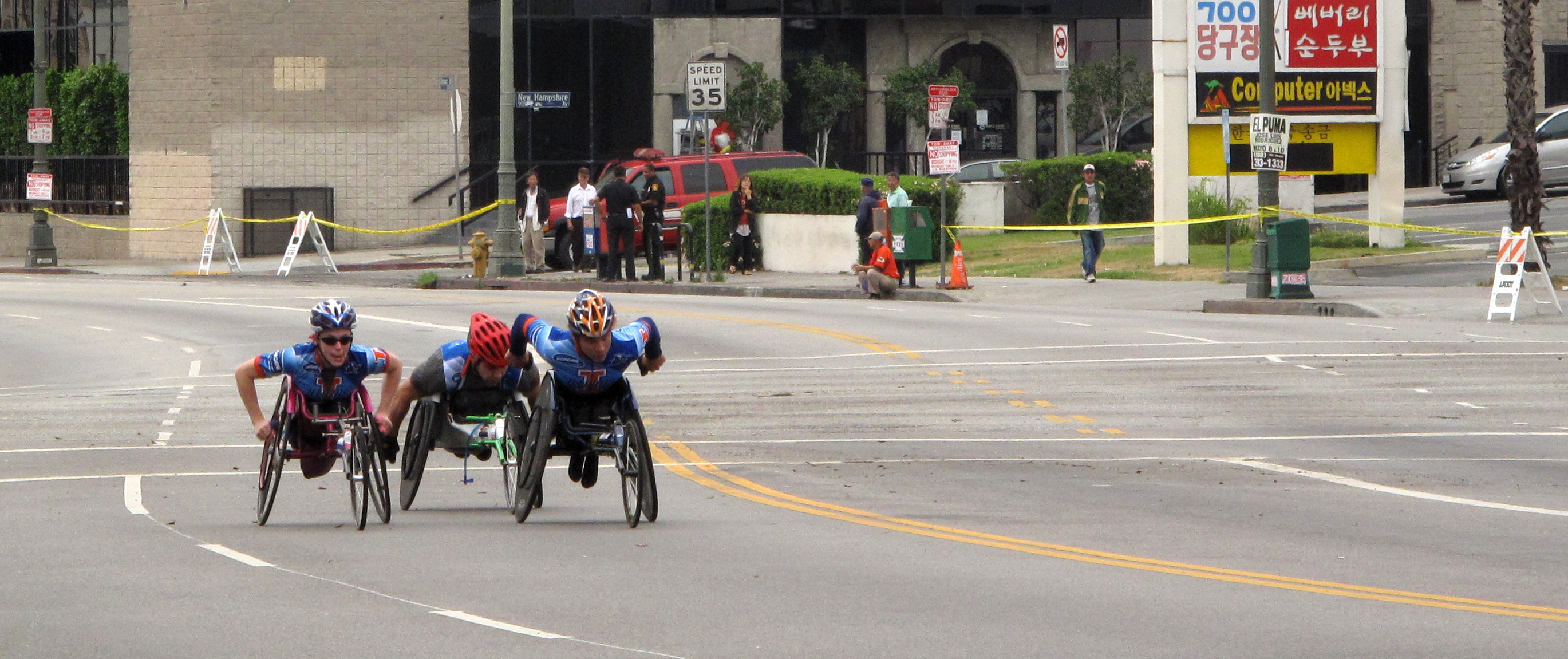
Traversing Olympic Blvd. in 2009

The Los Angeles Marathon (formerly known as the City of Los Angeles Marathon) is an annual running event typically held each spring in Los Angeles, California, since 1986. The marathon was inspired by the success of the 1984 Summer Olympic Games hosted in Los Angeles. It is one of the five largest marathons in the country, with 26,000 participants.

Since 2020, the event has been sponsored by Asics and is officially titled the Los Angeles Marathon presented by ASICS.

== History ==
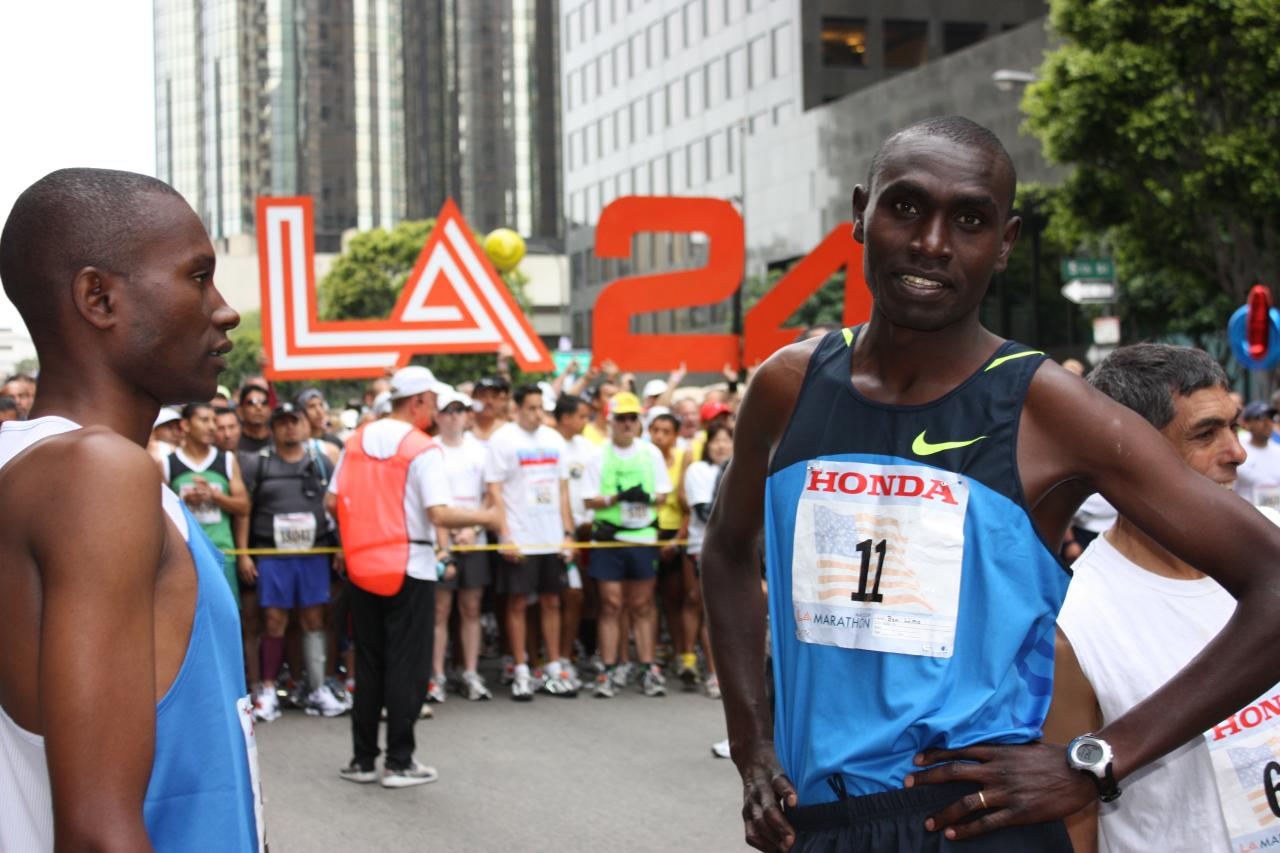
Benjamin Limo at the start of the marathon in 2009

=== Municipal Games era ===
In 1970, a race of length 25 miles (40 km) was held in Los Angeles.

In 1971, the race was lengthened to the distance of a standard marathon – 26 miles 385 yards – and known as the "Griffith Park Marathon". It was held at the same time as the Municipal Games.

The 1972 race was known as the "Municipal Games Marathon", while races from 1973 to 1977 were known as the "Los Angeles Marathon", (Note: The race was also known as the "City of Los Angeles Marathon" in 1973 and 1974.) and the 1978 edition was known as the "Los Angeles Police Marathon".

The Association of Road Racing Statisticians (ARRS) has no record of any races in this series after 1978.

=== Los Angeles Lite era ===
The inaugural race in 1981, known as the "Jordache Los Angeles Pro-Am Marathon", was run with two sections, a professional section with 100,000 USD in prize money, and an amateur section.

Both the 1982 and 1983 races were known as the "Los Angeles Lite Marathon".

In 1983, runners were misdirected, but the course was changed to ensure that finishers ran at least a marathon. (Note: National Masters News reported that "a well-intending police car, leading headstarting wheelchair participants, got out of runners' sight after the first quarter-mile, uphill, hence, the missed turn", and noted that the race director's "nimble adjustments of markers and barriers prevented further calamity", resulting in finishers running at least 26 mi 411 yd (42.219 km), and the leaders running around 26 mi 1,160 yd (42.904 km). One runner mentioned that many ended up jumping over a 3 ft (1 m) cable in a parking lot due to the error.)

ARRS has no record of any races in this series after 1983.

=== Current era ===
The inaugural marathon of the current series was first held in 1986. William Burke, the husband of former congresswoman and later Los Angeles County supervisor Yvonne Braithwaite Burke, was the inaugural president, and was responsible for obtaining corporate sponsorships and recruiting runners despite the lack of an organized running community. The first year had 11,000 entrants, the largest first-time marathon field, and ran a $357,000 operating deficit.

In 1997, Nadezhda Ilyina crossed the finish line first, but was disqualified for cutting the course through a service station. (Note: Ilyina stated that she was looking for a restroom when she ran into a gas station. A referee stated that this gave her an advantage of at least 25 yd (23 m).) The victory went to Ilyina's friend and first-time marathoner Lornah Kiplagat.

Burke and business partner Marie Patrick sold the marathon to Devine Racing in 2004 for $15 million.

In 2008, Devine Racing sold the operating rights to the Los Angeles Marathon to then-Los Angeles Dodgers owner, Frank McCourt. McCourt announced in 2019 that he would donate the Los Angeles Marathon and parent company Conqur Endurance to The McCourt Foundation, a Boston-based philanthropic organization overseen by his cousin, Brian McCourt. The foundation uses the marathon as a means to fundraise with other charitable organizations.

The race date for 2009 was moved to Memorial Day, May 25, because the city council wished "to limit the impact on Sunday morning church services". After runner criticism due to the increased probability of warmer weather, the race date was moved back to March for the 2010 race.

The 2016 edition was held on February 14 to coincide with the U.S. Olympic Trials for the marathon held in Los Angeles the day before.

The 34th edition of the marathon took place on March 24, 2019.

Despite Los Angeles County having issued a state of emergency four days prior due to the coronavirus pandemic and criticism from other public officials including councilman Mike Bonin, mayor Eric Garcetti allowed the 2020 marathon to continue as scheduled on March 8, 2020.

The 2021 edition of the race was postponed to November 7 due to the coronavirus, pandemic, with all registrants given the option of running the race virtually or transferring their entry to 2022, 2023, or 2024.

In 2022, the marathon chase was revived, after a 7 year absence after its 10 year stint. The chase involves both women and men elite fields running to reach the finish line first. However, the women are given a head start based on an assessment on both fields and their personal bests. For example, the 2024 edition featured a 17 minute head start favoring the women. Along with a $6,000 prize for the winner of each gender field, the winner of the chase earns a $10,000 bonus.

The 2026 edition, held on March 8, 2026, produced the closest finish in the marathon's history. Kenyan runner Michael Kimani Kamau led the men's race by 56 seconds at the 40-kilometer mark with a split of 2:03:40, running solo at the front through most of the second half. In the final stretch toward the finish in Century City, Kamau veered off the racing line at an unmarked turn after a spectator encounter; American Nathan Martin closed the gap with a finishing kick and was credited with the victory by 0.01 seconds in an official time of 2:11:17, eclipsing the previous closest margin of seven seconds set by Elisha Barno in 2019.

== Course ==
External image
- Course map of full marathon in 2020

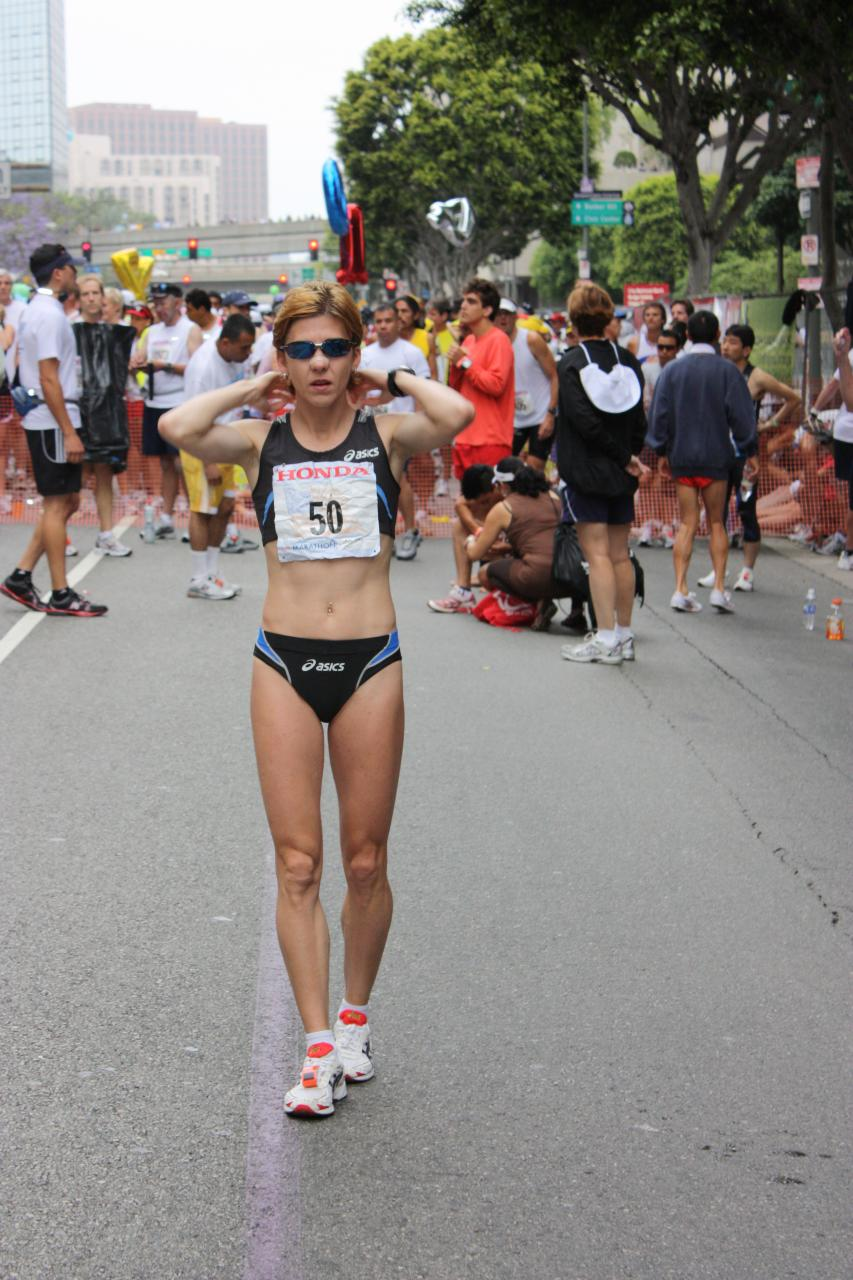
Romanian Nuța Olaru in 2009

The original route in 1986 started at Exposition Park and ended at the Los Angeles Memorial Coliseum.

The route around the turn of the millennium both started and ended in Downtown Los Angeles.

From 2007 to 2008, it started south of Universal City and ended in Downtown Los Angeles. (Note: In an effort to publicize the new route, marathon executives tapped Division of Labor, a San Francisco based ad agency to create a campaign dubbed "A Landmark Every Mile". It featured a quick succession of shots of the numerous iconic sites along the route. The campaign helped the marathon sell out for the first time in history.) Since McCourt purchased the marathon, the route has started at the Dodger Stadium parking lot ever since.

The iconic "Stadium to Sea" route started at Dodger Stadium (Note: Frank McCourt, the owner of the marathon, once owned the Los Angeles Dodgers.) and ended in Santa Monica.

The course was changed in the middle of 2020 to end at Avenue of the Stars in Century City due to "dramatically increased costs quoted by the city of Santa Monica" to continue hosting the finish there.

== Community impact ==
In 2014, the Los Angeles Marathon charity program continued its tremendous growth as 91 participating charities combined to raise a cumulative total $3.7 million.

== Students Run LA ==
In 1987, six students at East Los Angeles’ Boyle Heights High School enrolled in a marathon training program offered by teacher Harry Shabazian. On March 4, 1990, two dozen teachers from around the city joined the three co-founders, with students from their respective schools, and together, they all ran in the Los Angeles Marathon V. In 1993, Students Run LA spun off from LAUSD and became an independent 501(c)(3) organization. SRLA continues to provide its after-school mentoring and training program to all students of grades 7-12 for free. For the 6 months leading to the marathon, SRLA grants free entry and transport to its participants in races of increasing length, a 5K, 10K, 15K, two half marathons, and a 30K. Students in the program receive free training shirts, running shoes, marathon uniforms, along with race expenses. Today, more than 3,200 middle and high school students, from 185 school and community programs, train alongside 550 volunteer leaders, and 99% of students complete the LA Marathon.

Inspired by the success of SRLA, a pilot project was begun with the Montreal Marathon and Students on the run (Étudiants dans la course) was created with the first objective to complete the September 2010 Montreal Marathon. There were 19 students to begin with and 12 completed the 2010 event. The program continues with a new group and a new objective, complete the 2011 event.

== Legacy Runners ==
Each year, the marathon honors Legacy Runners, runners who have finished every Los Angeles Marathon since its inception in 1986. Each Legacy Runner receives a special bib with a permanent bib number.

In the 2024 edition, 95 Legacy Runners completed their 1000th mile of the LA Marathon, which was situated at mile 4 of the race.

== Television coverage ==
From 1986 to 2001 KCOP-TV televised the Los Angeles Marathon, in 2002, KCAL-TV, from 2003 to 2007, KNBC and from 2008 to 2025, KTLA. Since 2026, the marathon has been broadcast on KNBC with a Spanish language broadcast on KVEA, under a contract which will last until 2029.

== Top finishers ==
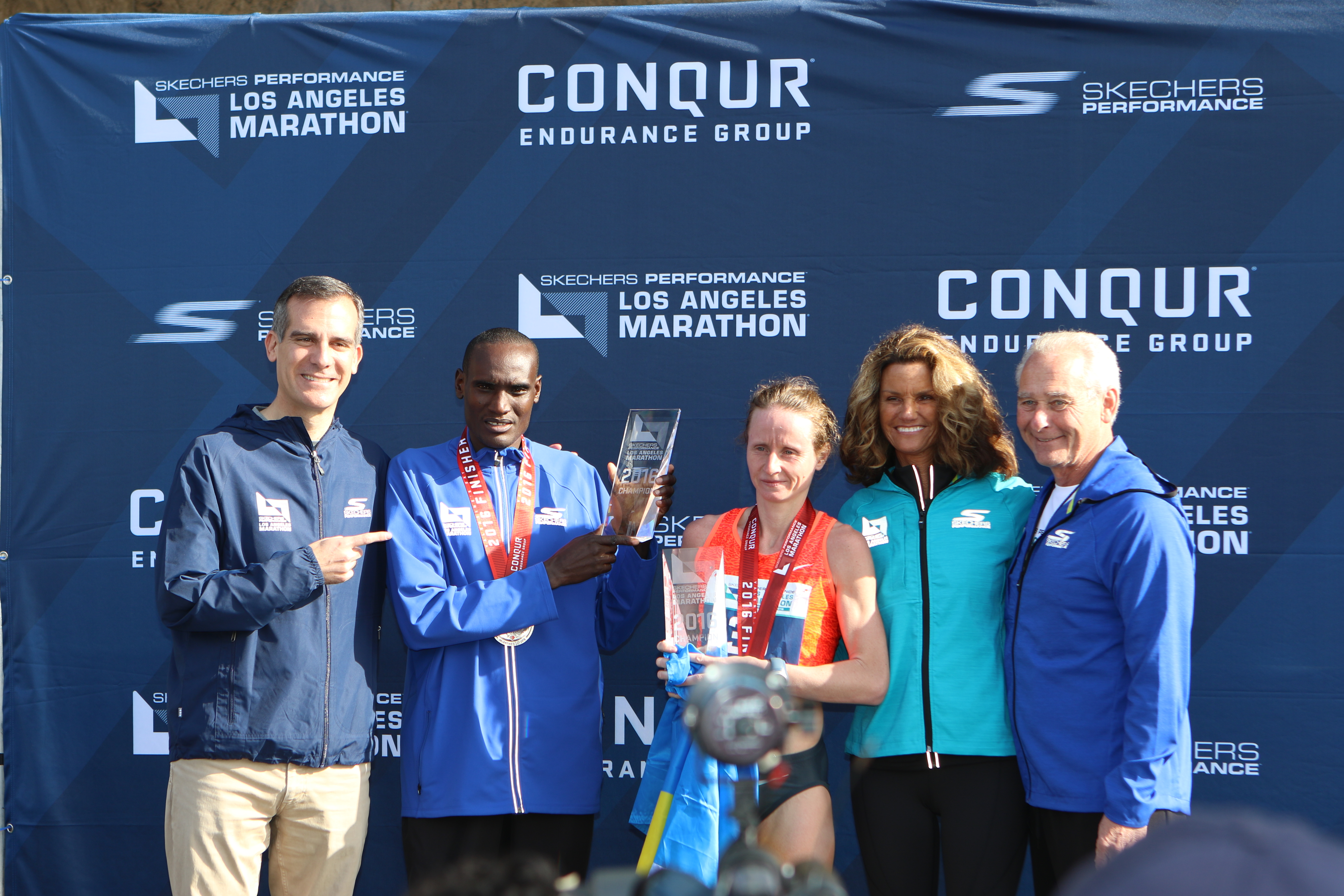
Winners Weldon Kirui and Nataliya Lehonkova with Mayor Garcetti, 2016

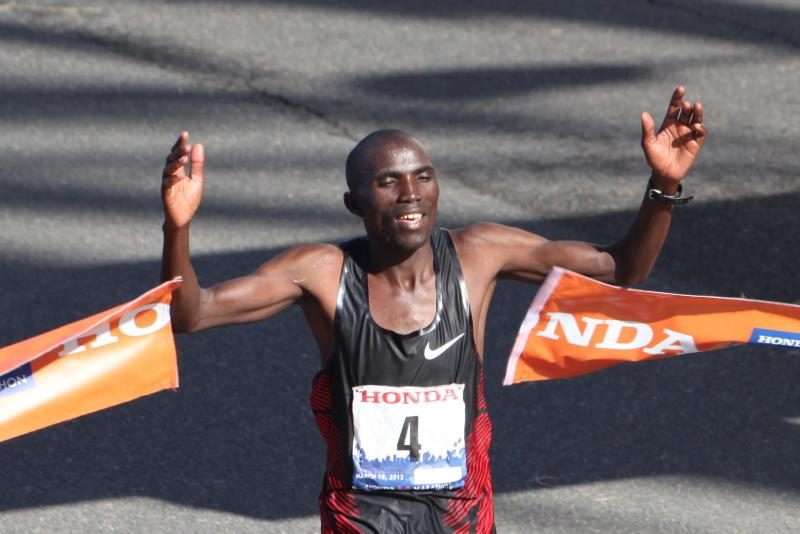
Simon Njoroge winning in 2012

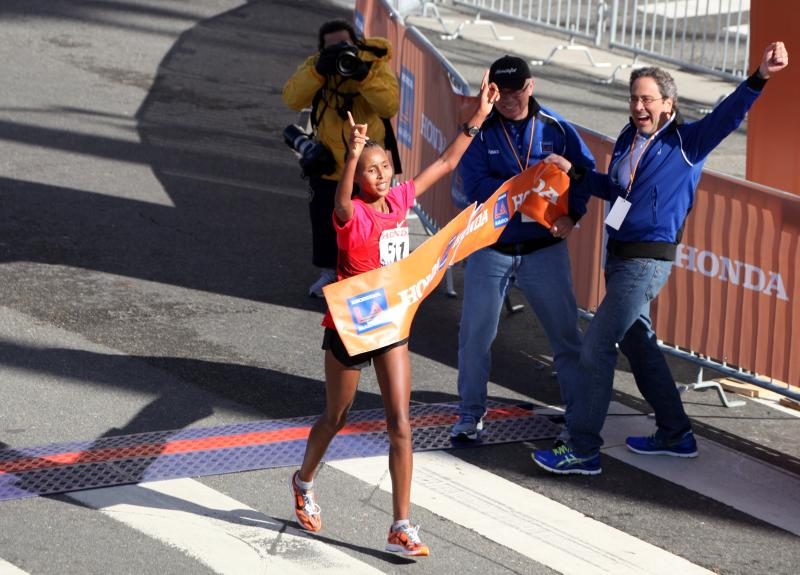
Fatuma Sado winning in 2012

Ages of top finishers in the Masters category are given in parentheses.

Key: Course record

Year
Category	Men		Women	
2026 Results March 8, 2026
Open	Nathan Martin (USA)	2:11:17	Priscah Cherono (KEN)	2:25:20
Wheelchair	Miguel Jimenez Vergara (USA)	1:42:12	Hannah Babalola (NGR)	2:17:52
2025 Results March 16, 2025
Open	Matt Richtman (USA)	2:07:46	Tejinesh Gebisa Tulu (ETH)	2:30:16
Wheelchair	Francisco Sanclemente (COL)	1:38:09	Wakako Tsuchida (JPN)	2:03:56
2024 Results March 17, 2024
Open	(Kenya) Dominic Ngeno	2:11:01	(Kenya) Stacy Ndiwa	2:25:29
Wheelchair	(Colombia) Francisco Sanclemente	1:37:14	(United States) Hannah Babalola	2:19:24
2023 Results March 19, 2023
Open	(Ethiopia) Jemal Yimer	2:13:15	(Kenya) Stacy Ndiwa	2:31:02
Wheelchair	(Colombia) Francisco Sanclemente	1:43:55	(United States) Hannah Babalola	2:50:35
2022 Results March 20, 2022
Open	(Kenya) John Korir	2:09:08	(Kenya) Delvine Meringor	2:25:04
Wheelchair	(United States) Tyler Byers	1:49:17	(United States) Corey Petersen	3:23:32
2021 Results November 7, 2021
Open	(Kenya) John Korir	2:12:48	(United Kingdom) Natasha Cockram	2:33:17
Wheelchair	(United States) Cesar Gonzalez	2:08:26	(United States) Mary Thompson	4:25:01
2020 Results March 8, 2020
Open	(Ethiopia) Bayelign Teshager	2:08:26	(Kenya) Margaret Muriuki	2:29:27
Masters	(United States) Carlos Lopez (42)	2:37:49	(United States) Madeleine Sargent (42)	2:48:17
Wheelchair	(Spain) Rafael Botello Jimenez	1:44:37	(Brazil) Vanessa Christina de Souza	1:59:55
2019 Results March 24, 2019
Open	(Kenya) Elisha Barno	2:11:45	(Ethiopia) Askale Marachi	2:24:11
Masters	(United States) Jesse Williams (41)	2:36:54	(United States) Ingrid Walters (47)	2:48:03
Wheelchair	(Canada) Joshua Cassidy	1:31:48	(United States) Katrina Gerhard	1:56:23
2018 Results March 18, 2018
Open	(Kenya) Weldon Kirui	2:11:47	(Ethiopia) Sule Gedo	2:33:50
Masters	(United States) Carlos Larios (45)	2:34:18	(United States) Ingrid Walters (46)	2:55:28
Wheelchair	(United States) Krige Schabort	1:35:40	(United States) Michelle Wheeler	2:16:36
2017 Results March 19, 2017
Open	(Kenya) Elisha Barno	2:11:53	(Kenya) Hellen Jepkurgat	2:34:24
Masters	(United States) Peter Lawrence (45)	2:38:05	(United States) Gina Johnson (43)	3:10:27
Wheelchair	(United States) Tom Davis	1:06:52	(United States) Jenna Rollman	1:43:14
2016 Results February 14, 2016
Open	(Kenya) Weldon Kirui	2:13:06	(Ukraine) Nataliya Lehonkova	2:30:40
Masters	(United States) Brett Bernacchi (43)	2:40:07	(United States) Rebecca Trachsel (41)	3:05:29
Wheelchair	(United States) Owen Daniels	1:21:27	(United States) Jenna Rollman	1:53:44
2015 Results March 15, 2015
Open	(Kenya) Daniel Limo	2:10:36	(Kenya) Ogla Kimaiyo	2:34:10
Masters	(United States) Oswaldo Hurtado (41)	2:34:03	(United States) Victoria Russell (43)	2:50:03
Wheelchair	(United States) Scott Parson	1:37:12	(United States) Shirley Reilly	2:00:27
2014 Results March 9, 2014
Open	(Ethiopia) Gebo Burka	2:10:37	(Ethiopia) Amane Gobena	2:27:37
Masters	(United States) Ricardo Ramirez (41)	2:38:20	(United States) Dolores Valencia (49)	2:57:58
Wheelchair	(United States) Joshua George	1:33:11	(United States) Susannah Scaroni	1:54:54
2013 Results March 17, 2013
Open	(Kenya) Erick Mose	2:09:43	(Belarus) Aleksandra Duliba	2:25:39
Masters	(France) Abderrahmane Djemadi (42)	2:37:07	(United States) Deena Kastor (40)	2:32:39
Wheelchair	(United States) Krige Schabort	1:30:50	(United States) Susannah Scaroni	1:54:39
2012 Results March 18, 2012
Open	(Kenya) Simon Njoroge	2:12:12	(Ethiopia) Fatuma Sado	2:25:39
Masters	(United States) Nicholas Bowden (40)	2:38:26	(Ukraine) Tetyana Mezentseva (40)	2:31:20
Wheelchair	(United States) Krige Schabort	1:39:53	(United States) Shirley Reilly	1:57:09
2011 Results March 20, 2011
Open	(Ethiopia) Markos Geneti	2:06:35	(Ethiopia) Buzunesh Deba	2:26:34
Masters	(Mexico) Juan Jose Ortiz Jauregui (44)	2:44:10	(Russia) Svetlana Ponomarenko (41)	2:38:56
Wheelchair	(South Africa) Krige Schabort	1:33:15	(United States) Shirley Reilly	1:57:25
2010 Results March 21, 2010
Open	(Kenya) Wesley Korir	2:09:19	(Kenya) Edna Kiplagat	2:25:38
Masters	(United States) Juan Ramirez (41)	2:39:35	(United States) Linda Somers-Smith (48)	2:36:33
Wheelchair	(South Africa) Krige Schabort	1:31:51	(United States) Amanda McGrory	1:53:12
2009 Results May 25, 2009
Open	(Kenya) Wesley Korir	2:08:24	(Russia) Tatyana Petrova	2:25:59
Masters	(United States) Martin Rindahl (45)	2:43:17	(United States) Carista Strickland (47)	3:14:45
Wheelchair	(Mexico) Aaron Gordian	1:31:19	(United States) Amanda McGrory	1:48:13
2008 Results March 2, 2008
Open	(Kenya) Laban Moiben	2:13:50	(Russia) Tatyana Aryasova	2:29:09
Masters	(Guatemala) Fermin Sequen (40)	2:34:34	(Russia) Tatiana Titova (42)	2:51:32
Wheelchair	(United States) Saul Mendoza	1:31:12	(United States) Cheri Blauwet	1:53:35
2007 Results March 4, 2007
Open	(Kenya) Fred Mogaka	2:17:14	(Russia) Ramilya Burangulova	2:37:54
Masters	(Japan) Yoshihisa Hosaka (58)	2:49:06	(Russia) Ramilya Burangulova (45)	2:37:54
Wheelchair	(Australia) Kurt Fearnley	1:23:40	(United Kingdom) Shelly Woods	1:50:55
2006 Results March 19, 2006
Open	(Kenya) Benson Cherono	2:08:40	(Russia) Lidiya Grigoryeva	2:25:10
Masters	(United States) Jose Ortiz Pina (43)	2:33:23	(Ukraine) Lyudmyla Pushkina (40)	2:41:15
Wheelchair	(South Africa) Ernst Van Dyk	1:24:48	(United States) Shirley Reilly	1:55:23
2005 Results March 6, 2005
Open	(Kenya) Mark Saina	2:09:35	(Russia) Lyubov Denisova	2:26:11
Masters	Ezequiel Hernandez (41)	2:45:01	(Ukraine) Tatyana Pozdnyakova (50)	2:31:05
Wheelchair	(Australia) Kurt Fearnley	1:30:11	(United States) Cheri Blauwet	1:51:45
2004 Results March 7, 2004
Open	(Kenya) David Kiptoo Kirui	2:13:41	(Ukraine) Tatyana Pozdnyakova	2:30:17
Masters	(Mexico) Reynaldo Ramirez (40)	2:35:38	(Ukraine) Tatyana Pozdnyakova (49)	2:30:17
Wheelchair	(France) Joel Jeannot	1:27:08	(United States) Cheri Blauwet	1:54:02
2003 Results March 2, 2003
Open	(Kenya) Mark Yatich	2:09:52	(Ukraine) Tatyana Pozdnyakova	2:29:40
Masters	(United States) Robert Leonardo (40)	2:40:46	(Ukraine) Tatyana Pozdnyakova (48)	2:29:40
Wheelchair	(Mexico) Saúl Mendoza	1:27:07	(United States) Cheri Blauwet	1:50:06
2002 Results March 3, 2002
Open	(Kenya) Steven Ndungu	2:10:27	(Russia) Lyubov Denisova	2:28:49
Masters	(United States) Jose Díaz (46)	2:41:07	(Ukraine) Tatyana Pozdnyakova (47)	2:30:26
Wheelchair	(South Africa) Ernst Van Dyk	1:28:44	(Mexico) Ariadne Hernandez	1:55:01
2001 Results March 4, 2001
Open	(Kenya) Steven Ndungu	2:13:13	(Russia) Elana Paramonova	2:35:58
Masters	(United States) Raymond Baradas (41)	2:38:43	(United States) Teresa Boches-Saban (44)	3:05:20
Wheelchair	(Mexico) Saúl Mendoza	1:32:50	(Mexico) Ariadne Hernandez	2:04:30
2000 Results March 5, 2000
Open	(Kenya) Benson Mutiisya Mbithi	2:11:55	(Estonia) Jane Salumäe	2:33:33
Masters	(United States) Marco Ortíz (50)	2:27:33	(United States) Judy Maguire (41)	2:58:21
Wheelchair	(Mexico) Saúl Mendoza	1:42:33	(United States) Jean Driscoll	2:12:17
1999 Results March 14, 1999
Open	(Kenya) Simon Bor	2:09:25	(Kyrgyzstan) Irina Bogachova	2:30:32
Masters	(Guatemala) Federico Yax	2:32:19	(United States) Judy Maguire	2:54:12
Wheelchair	(Mexico) Saúl Mendoza	1:28:43	(United States) Deanna Sodoma	2:03:44
1998 Results March 29, 1998
Open	(Tanzania) Zebedayo Bayo	2:11:21	(Kenya) Lornah Kiplagat	2:33:58
Masters	(Switzerland) Peter Rischl	2:31:53	(United States) Candy Clark	3:08:56
Wheelchair	(Mexico) Saúl Mendoza	1:29:57	(Japan) Kazu Hatanaka	1:56:55
1997 Results March 2, 1997
Open	(Morocco) El-Maati Chaham	2:14:16	(Kenya) Lornah Kiplagat	2:33:50
Masters	(United States) Yoshio Ishizuka	2:36:14	(United States) Philomena Chandra	3:03:10
Wheelchair	(Mexico) Saúl Mendoza	1:37:27	(Australia) Louise Sauvage	1:49:22
1996 Results March 3, 1996
Open	(Costa Rica) Jose Luis Molina	2:13:23	(Ukraine) Lyubov Klochko	2:30:30
Masters	(Guatemala) Hugo Juárez	2:33:26	(United States) Lorraine Gersitz	3:11:50
Wheelchair	(Switzerland) Heinz Frei	1:27:10	(United States) Jean Driscoll	1:46:09
1995 Results March 5, 1995
Open	(Ecuador) Rolando Vera	2:11:39	(France) (Note: From New Caledonia, a territory of France) Nadia Prasad	2:29:48
Masters	(United States) John Bednarksi	2:36:40	(United States) Alfreda Iglehart	3:13:29
Wheelchair	(Australia) Paul Wiggins	1:36:06	(United States) Jean Driscoll	1:52:51
1994 Results March 6, 1994
Open	(United States) Paul Pilkington	2:12:13	(United States) Olga Appell	2:28:12
Masters	(United States) Gregg Horner	2:34:20	(Italy) Emma Scaunich	2:37:05
Wheelchair	(France) Phillipe Couprie and (Australia) Paul Wiggins	1:34:52	(Denmark) Connie Hansen	1:48:58
1993 Results March 7, 1993
Open	(Brazil) Joselido Rocha	2:14:28	(Ukraine) Lyubov Klochko	2:39:48
Masters	(United States) Dennis Bock	2:36:32	(United States) Candy Dodge	3:03:10
Wheelchair	(United States) Jan Mattern	1:32:15	(Denmark) Connie Hansen	1:51:26
1992 Results March 1, 1992
Open	(Republic of Ireland) John Treacy	2:12:29	Madina Biktagirova	2:26:23
Masters	(Mexico) Manuel García Pérez	2:25:35	(United States) Sandra Marshall	3:02:47
Wheelchair	(United States) Jim Knaub	1:40:53	(Denmark) Connie Hansen	1:56:17
1991 Results March 3, 1991
Open	(United States) Mark Plaatjes	2:10:29	(United States) Cathy O'Brien	2:29:38
Masters	(New Zealand) John Campbell (42)	2:14:33	(United Kingdom) Priscilla Webb	2:40:20
Wheelchair	(United States) Jim Knaub	1:40:43	(Denmark) Connie Hansen	1:57:11
1990 Results March 4, 1990
Open	(Colombia) Pedro Ortíz	2:11:54	(United States) Julie Isphording	2:32:25
Masters	(New Zealand) John Campbell (41)	2:20:15	(Italy) Graziela Striuli	3:26:48
Wheelchair	(France) Moustapha Badid	1:45:40	(United States) Ann Cody-Morris	2:03:49
1989 Results March 5, 1989
Open	(Canada) Art Boileau	2:13:01	(Soviet Union) Zoya Ivanova	2:34:42
Masters	(New Zealand) John Campbell (40)	2:17:51	(United States) Carol Mather	3:02:57
Wheelchair	(United States) Jim Knaub	1:46:52	(United States) Candace Cable-Brookes	2:07:03
1988 Results March 6, 1988
Open	(Mexico) Martín Mondragón	2:10:19	(Mexico) Blanca Jaime	2:36:11
Masters	(United States) Bob Schlau (40)	2:19:27	(United States) Harolene Walters (47)	2:54:18
Wheelchair	(United States) Bob Molinatti	1:56:35	(United States) Candace Cable-Brookes	2:19:38
1987 Results March 1, 1987
Open	(Canada) Art Boileau	2:13:08	(United States) Nancy Ditz	2:35:24
Masters	(Colombia) Victor Mora García	2:19:44	(United States) Barbara Fituze	2:47:21
Wheelchair	(Canada) Ted Vance	1:54:06	(United States) Candace Cable-Brookes	2:05:45
1986 Results March 9, 1986
Open	(United States) Ric Sayre	2:12:59	(United States) Nancy Ditz	2:36:27
Masters	(Sweden) Kjell-Erik Ståhl (40)	2:19:20	(United States) Harolene Walters (45)	2:57:26
Wheelchair	(United States) Bob Molinatti	2:16:36	(United States) Candace Cable-Brookes	2:23:10
