= Maple Park, Illinois =

- Village
- Location of Maple Park in DeKalb County, Illinois
- Coordinates: 41°54′45″N 88°37′18″W
- Country: United States
- State: Illinois
- Counties: DeKalb, Kane
- Townships: Cortland, Pierce, Virgil

Area
  - Total: 2.16 sq mi (5.59 km^{2})
  - Land: 2.15 sq mi (5.58 km^{2})
  - Water: 0.0039 sq mi (0.01 km^{2})
- Elevation: 876 ft (267 m)

Population (2020)
  - Total: 1,433
  - Density: 665.3/sq mi (256.87/km^{2})
- Time zone: UTC-6 (CST)
  - Summer (DST): UTC-5 (CDT)
- ZIP Code(s): 60151
- Area codes: 815 and 630
- FIPS code: 17-46604
- GNIS feature ID: 2399247
- Website: villageofmaplepark.org

Maple Park is a village in DeKalb and Kane counties in the U.S. state of Illinois. The population was 1,433 at the 2020 census, up from 1,310 at the 2010 census. Maple Park was formerly known as Lodi.

== History ==
Maple Park was originally called "Lodi", after Lodi, Lombardy. The present name comes from a nearby grove of sugar maple trees. A post office called "Lodi" was established first in 1837, and the post office was renamed "Maple Park" in 1880.

== Geography ==
The majority of Maple Park's population is in Kane County, but more of its area is in DeKalb County. Illinois Route 38 runs through the southern side of the village, leading east 15 miles (24 km) to Geneva and west 8 miles (13 km) to DeKalb. It is 52 miles (84 km) west of downtown Chicago.

According to the 2021 census gazetteer files, Maple Park has a total area of 2.16 square miles (5.59 km^{2}), of which 2.15 square miles (5.57 km^{2}) (or 99.86%) is land and 0.00 square miles (0.00 km^{2}) (or 0.14%) is water.

== Demographics ==
Historical population
Census	Pop.	Note	%±
1880	385		—
1890	382		−0.8%
1900	391		2.4%
1910	389		−0.5%
1920	384		−1.3%
1930	389		1.3%
1940	398		2.3%
1950	433		8.8%
1960	592		36.7%
1970	660		11.5%
1980	637		−3.5%
1990	641		0.6%
2000	765		19.3%
2010	1,310		71.2%
2020	1,433		9.4%
U.S. Decennial Census

=== Racial and ethnic composition ===
Maple Park village, Illinois – Racial and ethnic composition Note: the US Census treats Hispanic/Latino as an ethnic category. This table excludes Latinos from the racial categories and assigns them to a separate category. Hispanics/Latinos may be of any race.
Race / Ethnicity (NH = Non-Hispanic)	Pop 2000	Pop 2010	Pop 2020	% 2000	% 2010	% 2020
White alone (NH)	733	1,189	1,259	95.82%	90.76%	87.86%
Black or African American alone (NH)	0	4	2	0.00%	0.31%	0.14%
Native American or Alaska Native alone (NH)	3	2	0	0.39%	0.15%	0.00%
Asian alone (NH)	1	7	10	0.13%	0.53%	0.70%
Native Hawaiian or Pacific Islander alone (NH)	0	0	0	0.00%	0.00%	0.00%
Other race alone (NH)	4	1	6	0.52%	0.08%	0.42%
Mixed race or Multiracial (NH)	5	13	42	0.65%	0.99%	2.93%
Hispanic or Latino (any race)	19	94	114	2.48%	7.18%	7.96%
Total	765	1,310	1,433	100.00%	100.00%	100.00%

=== 2020 census ===
As of the 2020 census, Maple Park had a population of 1,433. The population density was 664.35 inhabitants per square mile (256.51/km^{2}).

The median age was 37.0 years. 25.3% of residents were under the age of 18 and 12.6% of residents were 65 years of age or older. For every 100 females there were 101.3 males, and for every 100 females age 18 and over there were 102.7 males age 18 and over.

0.0% of residents lived in urban areas, while 100.0% lived in rural areas.

There were 519 households in Maple Park, of which 37.8% had children under the age of 18 living in them. Of all households, 56.3% were married-couple households, 17.9% were households with a male householder and no spouse or partner present, and 19.3% were households with a female householder and no spouse or partner present. About 23.2% of all households were made up of individuals and 9.8% had someone living alone who was 65 years of age or older.

There were 547 housing units, of which 5.1% were vacant. The housing unit density was 253.59 per square mile (97.91/km^{2}). The homeowner vacancy rate was 2.0% and the rental vacancy rate was 8.4%.

=== Demographic estimates ===
There were 404 families residing in the village. The average household size was 3.37 and the average family size was 3.02.

=== Income and poverty ===
The median income for a household in the village was $90,833, and the median income for a family was $105,714. Males had a median income of $53,092 versus $36,667 for females. The per capita income for the village was $34,935. About 1.0% of families and 2.6% of the population were below the poverty line, including 0.0% of those under age 18 and 0.0% of those age 65 or over.

== Education ==
Kaneland Community Unit School District 302 operates Kaneland High School.
