= Fox Valley (Illinois River) =

Region centered on the Fox River of Northern Illinois

Coordinates: 42°0′N 88°15′W

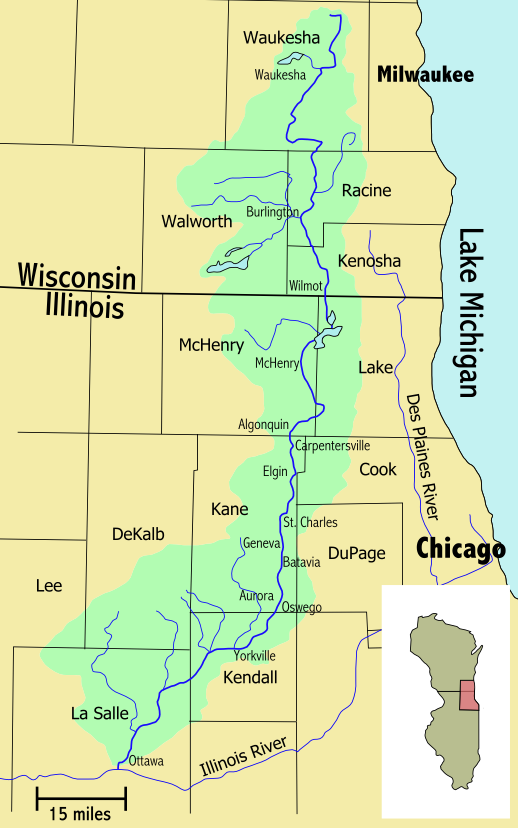
Fox Valley

The Fox Valley—also commonly known as the Fox River Valley—is a region centered on the Fox River of Northern Illinois, along the western edges of the Chicago metropolitan area. The region extends from the village of Antioch, in far northern Illinois, to the city of Ottawa in the south. It includes rural areas, suburban development, and 19th-century downtowns. Around 1 million people live in this area.

Native American tribes that historically lived in this region include the Potawatomi, Sauk, and Meskwaki tribes.

Some of cities in the Fox River Valley are part of the Rust Belt. Within this region is Aurora, the second-largest city in the state, Elgin, and the nearby cities of Batavia, St. Charles, and Geneva, which have been known as the Tri-City area since the early 20th century.

== Prominent cities ==
The following is a list of cities and villages from north to south, along the Fox River Valley:

- Antioch
- Fox Lake
- Johnsburg
- McHenry
- Fox River Grove
- Cary
- Algonquin
- Carpentersville
- East Dundee
- West Dundee
- Elgin
- South Elgin
- Wayne
- Campton Hills
- St. Charles
- Geneva
- Batavia
- North Aurora
- Aurora
- Montgomery
- Oswego
- Yorkville
- Millbrook
- Millington
- Sheridan
- Ottawa
