= Fox, Illinois =

- Unincorporated community
- Location within Illinois Location within the United States
- Coordinates: 41°37′22″N 88°30′0″W
- Country: United States
- State: Illinois
- County: Kendall
- Township: Fox
- Elevation: 705 ft (215 m)
- Time zone: UTC-6 (Central (CST))
  - Summer (DST): UTC-5 (CDT)
- Area code: 630
- GNIS feature ID: 408611

Fox is an unincorporated community in Kendall County, in the U.S. state of Illinois. It is located between the Village of Millbrook and the City of Yorkville.

The community was originally named Fox Station due to its relationship with the Chicago, Burlington, & Quincy Railroad. It served the local farming community by providing a school, grain elevator, feed mill, store and post office.
