= Jed Davis (politician) =

American politician

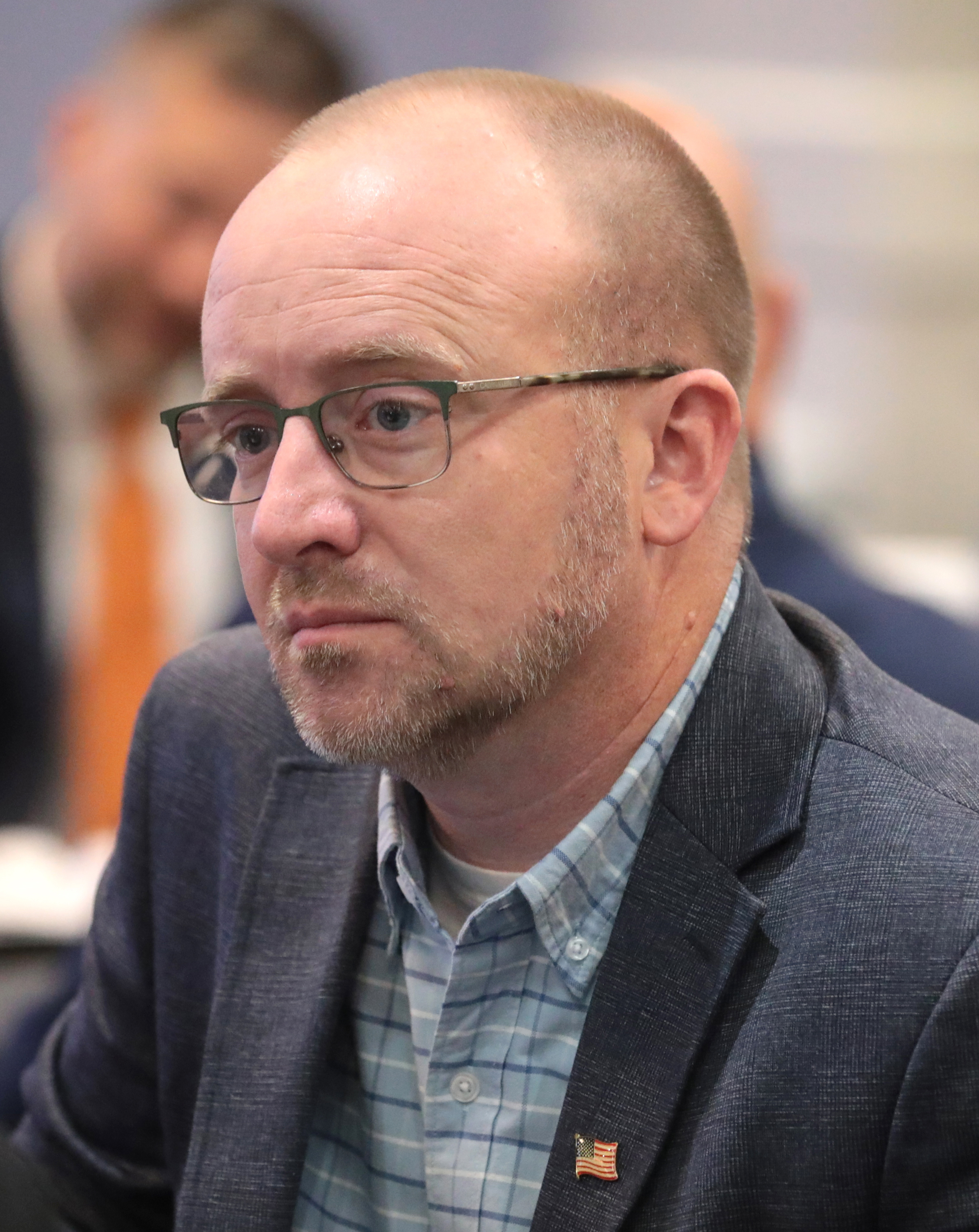
- Davis in 2022

Member of the Illinois House of Representatives from the 75th district
- Incumbent
- Assumed office January 11, 2023
- Preceded by: David Welter

Personal details
- Born: Jed Davis
- Party: Republican
- Education: Valparaiso University

Jed Davis is a Republican member of the Illinois House of Representatives from the 75th district. He was elected to the position in the 2022 election against Democratic candidate Heidi Henry on November 8, 2022. He assumed the seat on January 11, 2023.

== Early life and career ==
Davis attended local Lisbon Grade School, Newark Community High School then Valparaiso University to obtain a bachelor's degree in civil engineering. At the time of his election to the Illinois House of Representatives, he was a regional director for an international energy company and the president of the board of Parkview Christian Academy in Yorkville. He has served as a village trustee for Newark, Illinois. He is a licensed foster parent.

== Illinois House of Representatives ==
On November 21, 2021, Davis announced his candidacy for the Illinois House of Representatives from the 75th district. The 75th district, located on the southwestern edge of the Chicago metropolitan area includes parts of Grundy, Kendall, LaSalle, and Will counties. In the 2022 Republican primary, Davis defeated incumbent Republican David Welter for Republican nomination, and defeated Democratic candidate Heidi Henry in the 2022 general election.

Davis took office on January 11, 2023, at the start of the 103rd General Assembly. During his first term, Davis joined the Illinois Freedom Caucus, a group of Republican legislators. The group is inspired by and shares the beliefs of the Freedom Caucus of the United States House of Representatives. Davis serves on five committees. The committee on Cities and Villages, the committee on Economic Opportunity and Equity, the committee on Mental Health and Addiction, the committee on Small Business, Tech Innovation, and Entrepreneurship, and the Subcommittee of Transportation of Regulations, Roads & Bridges.
