= Helmar, Illinois =

- Unincorporated community
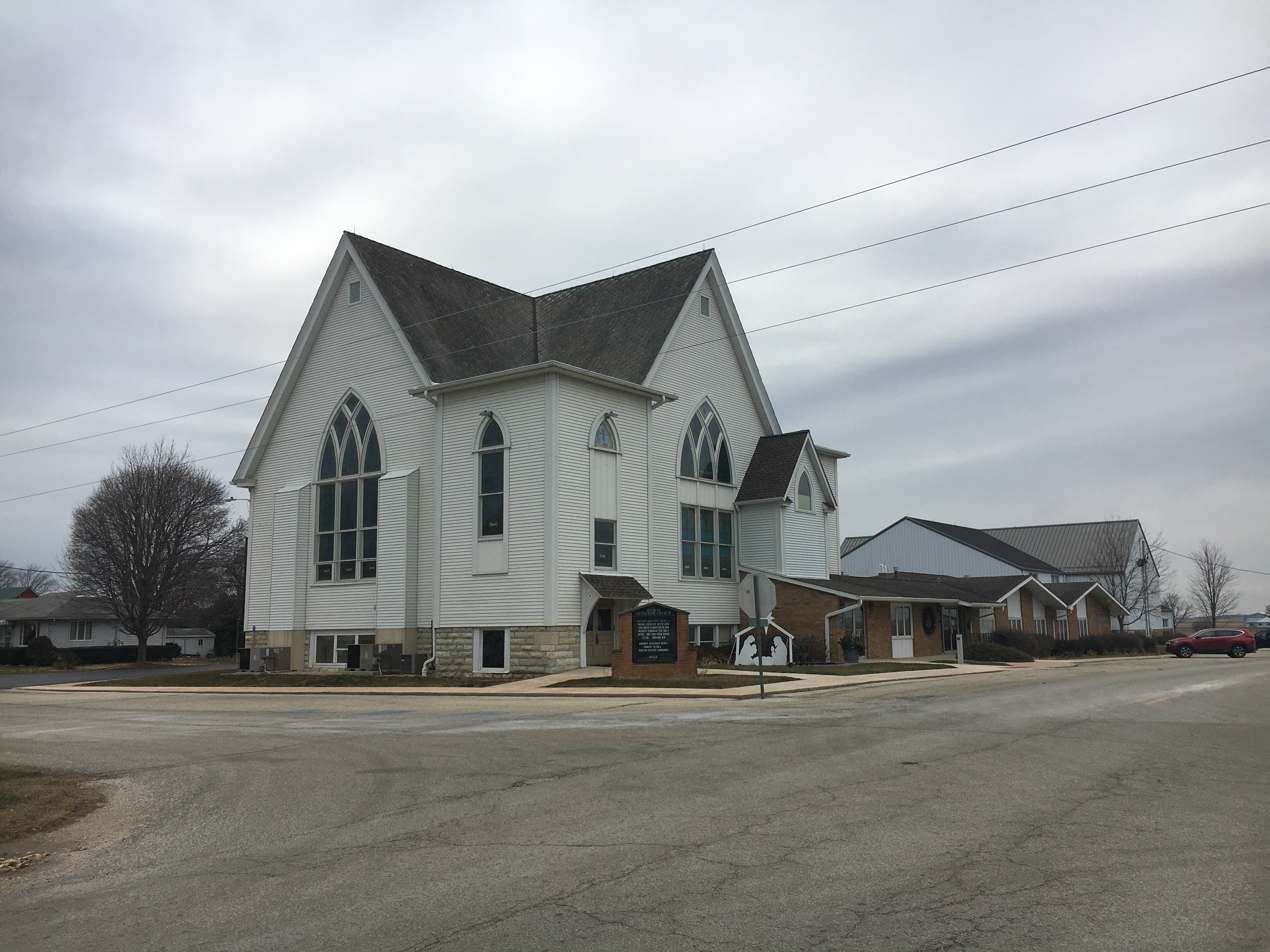
- Helmar Lutheran Church

- Location within Illinois Location within the United States
- Coordinates: 41°32′42″N 88°29′02″W
- Country: United States
- State: Illinois
- County: Kendall
- Elevation: 709 ft (216 m)
- Time zone: UTC-6 (Central (CST))
  - Summer (DST): UTC-5 (CDT)
- ZIP Code: 60541
- Area code: 815
- GNIS feature ID: 410040

Helmar is an unincorporated community in Kendall County, Illinois. The community is located near Newark and Plattville and is between Illinois State Routes 71 and 47.

== History ==
The community grew around the Lutheran church, then known as the North Prairie Lutheran Church, due to it being northward of Lisbon's church. Due to the church's name, the community as a whole was referred to as North Prairie. In 1894, the residents of North Prairie sought to establish a post office to serve the community. They needed to create a new name for the community, as North Prairie was already in use. They decided to name it Helmar, the anglicized form of Hjalmar, the Scandinavian name of early settler Andrew Anderson.

The post office remained in use until 1912.

Like many of the communities in the surrounding area, Norwegians made up a majority of the population of the community. Even today, these influences are represented within Helmar.
