= Fox Township, Illinois =

Fox Township, Illinois may refer to:

- Fox Township, Kendall County, Illinois
- Fox Township, Jasper County, Illinois

== See also ==
- Fox Township (disambiguation)
