= Fox Township, Pennsylvania =

Fox Township, Pennsylvania may refer to:

- Fox Township, Elk County, Pennsylvania
- Fox Township, Sullivan County, Pennsylvania

== See also ==
- Fox Township (disambiguation)
