= David Welter =

American politician

Member of the Illinois House of Representatives from the 75th district
- In office July 9, 2016 – January 11, 2023
- Preceded by: John D. Anthony
- Succeeded by: Jed Davis

Personal details
- Born: 1991 Joliet, Illinois
- Party: Republican
- Children: Three
- Website: repwelter.com

David Allen Welter is a Republican member of the Illinois House of Representatives representing the 75th district. The 75th district includes all or parts of Grundy, Kendall, LaSalle and Will counties. Prior to his appointment, he served as chairman of the Grundy County Board.

== Legislative career ==
John D. Anthony resigned from his seat in the Illinois House of Representatives effective June 17, 2016. Local Republican leaders appointed Welter to the vacancy and Welter was sworn in July 9, 2016. He is also the Republican spokesperson for the Committee on Energy & Environment. On January 25, 2021, he was appointed House Republican Conference chairperson for the 102nd General Assembly.

As of July 3, 2022, Representative Welter was a member of the following Illinois House committees:

- Appropriations - Public Safety Committee (HAPP)
- Energy & Environment Committee (HENG)
- Family Law & Probate Subcommittee (HJUA-FLAW)
- Health Care Availability & Access Committee (HHCA)
- Judiciary - Civil Committee (HJUA)
- Public Utilities Committee (HPUB)
- Utilities Subcommittee (HPUB-UTIL)

In the 2022 Republican primary, Jed Davis defeated Welter for renomination in the newly drawn 75th district.

== Post-legislative career ==
Welter is a real estate broker. On August 1, 2023, Illinois Governor J. B. Pritzker announced that he appointed Welter to the Executive Ethics Commission pending confirmation by the Illinois Senate.
