= Lisbon Township, Illinois =

Lisbon Township
- Township
- Location in Kendall County

- Kendall County's location in Illinois
- Coordinates: 41°30′23″N 088°25′12″W
- Country: United States
- State: Illinois
- County: Kendall

Area
  - Total: 36.59 sq mi (94.8 km^{2})
  - Land: 36.59 sq mi (94.8 km^{2})
  - Water: 0 sq mi (0 km^{2}) 0%
- Elevation: 604 ft (184 m)

Population (2020)
  - Total: 771
  - Density: 21.1/sq mi (8.14/km^{2})
- FIPS code: 17-093-43913
- GNIS feature ID: 0429263

Lisbon Township occupies the 6 mile square on the southern edge of Kendall County, Illinois. As of the 2020 census, its population was 771 and it contained 302 housing units.

Early settler John Moore was credited with naming Lisbon Township after Lisbon, Portugal, commenting he wanted a name that was "different." It contains portions of the communities of Helmar, Lisbon and Plattville. With a population of just under 1,000, it is the least-populous township in Kendall County.

== Geography ==
It is located at 41.506551 N, -88.419992 W.

According to the 2021 census gazetteer files, Lisbon Township has a total area of 36.59 square miles (94.77 km^{2}), all land.

== Demographics ==
As of the 2020 census there were 771 people, 209 households, and 159 families residing in the township. The population density was 21.07 inhabitants per square mile (8.14/km^{2}). There were 302 housing units at an average density of 8.25 per square mile (3.19/km^{2}). The racial makeup of the township was 91.57% White, 0.26% African American, 0.00% Native American, 0.39% Asian, 0.00% Pacific Islander, 2.46% from other races, and 5.32% from two or more races. Hispanic or Latino of any race were 6.87% of the population.

There were 209 households, out of which 28.70% had children under the age of 18 living with them, 65.55% were married couples living together, 6.70% had a female householder with no spouse present, and 23.92% were non-families. 17.20% of all households were made up of individuals, and 8.10% had someone living alone who was 65 years of age or older. The average household size was 2.89 and the average family size was 3.36.

The township's age distribution consisted of 20.4% under the age of 18, 13.1% from 18 to 24, 22% from 25 to 44, 29.3% from 45 to 64, and 15.2% who were 65 years of age or older. The median age was 40.3 years. For every 100 females, there were 95.5 males. For every 100 females age 18 and over, there were 98.8 males.

The median income for a household in the township was $84,063, and the median income for a family was $86,696. Males had a median income of $52,500 versus $25,625 for females. The per capita income for the township was $32,843. About 3.1% of families and 6.6% of the population were below the poverty line, including 8.1% of those under age 18 and 1.1% of those age 65 or over.

Historical population
Census	Pop.	Note	%±
2000	851		—
2010	899		5.6%
2020	771		−14.2%
U.S. Decennial Census

== Government ==
The township is governed by an elected Town Board of a Supervisor and four Trustees. The Township also has an elected Assessor, Clerk, and Highway Commissioner.
