= Bristol, Illinois =

- Unincorporated community
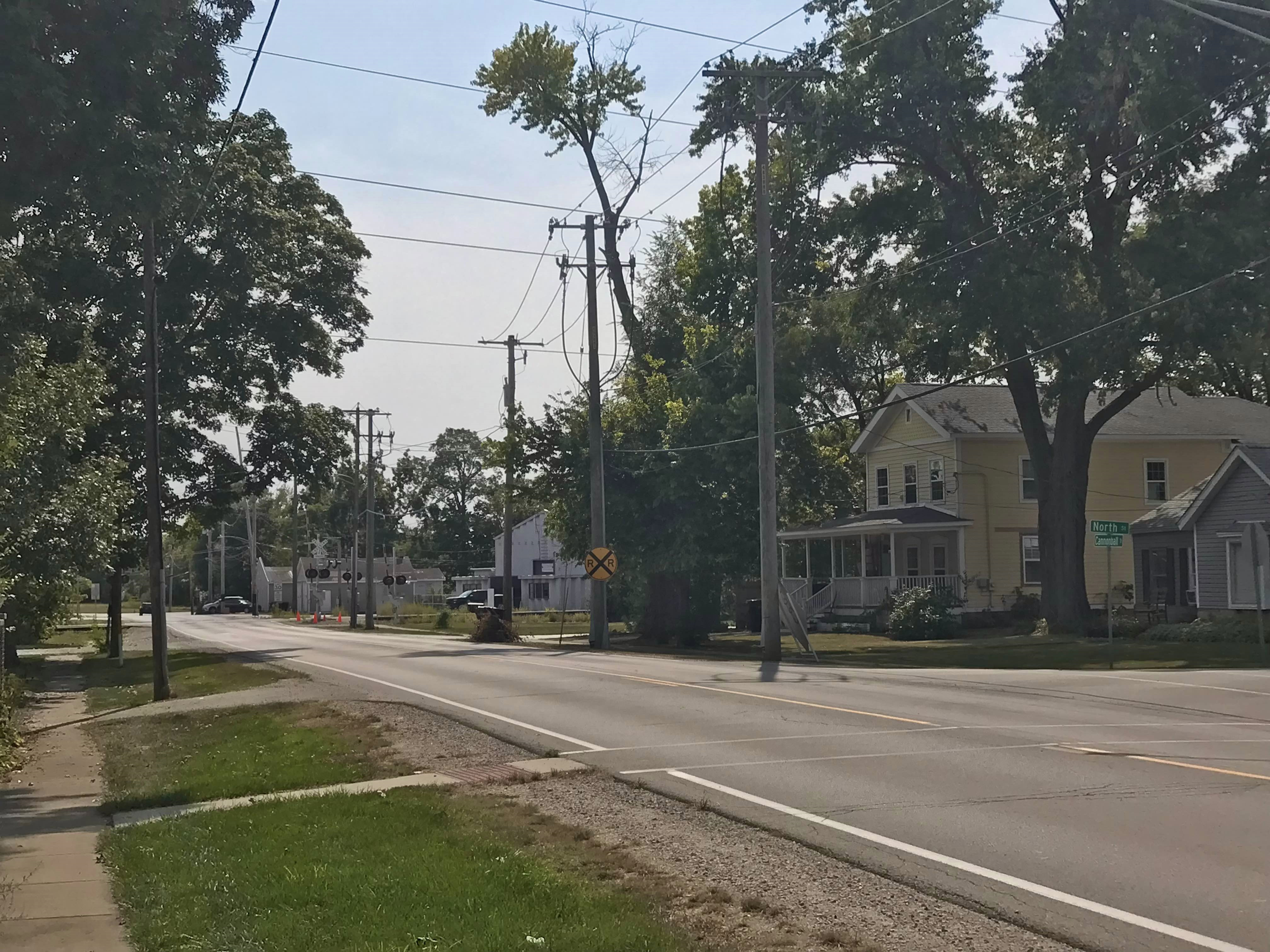
- A photo of former Bristol Station within Bristol, Illinois.

- Location within Illinois Location within the United States
- Coordinates: 41°41′08″N 88°25′41″W
- Country: United States
- State: Illinois
- County: Kendall
- Township: Bristol
- Elevation: 640 ft (200 m)
- Time zone: UTC-6 (CST)
  - Summer (DST): UTC-5 (CDT)
- ZIP code: 60512
- Area codes: 630/331
- GNIS feature ID: 404875

Bristol, Illinois, is an unincorporated community in Bristol Township, Kendall County in the U.S. state of Illinois, just south of the Kane County border. Oswego lies to its east, Montgomery lies to its north, and Yorkville lies to its south and west.

== History ==
Bristol originally was referred to as Bristol Station until 1957, when nearby Bristol merged with Yorkville to form a single unified city. Due to the unification, Bristol Station was able to drop the Station off its name and it is officially referred to as simply "Bristol". The community is still within proximity to Yorkville, whose borders are now no more than a mile from the center of town, and due to the growth of Oswego, Yorkville, and Sugar Grove, Bristol will soon either be annexed by one of the larger municipalities or become completely surrounded. Bristol has a small post office, bar, and train station located near the center of town. In June 2008, Raging Waves, Illinois' largest water park, was built just north of Bristol.

== Education ==
Bristol Grade School is an elementary school that lays within the community boundaries.

Bristol is served by the Yorkville Community Unit School District 115, including Yorkville High School.
