= Ament Corners, Illinois =

- Unincorporated community
- Location within Illinois Location within the United States
- Coordinates: 41°35′50″N 88°26′09″W
- Country: United States
- State: Illinois
- County: Kendall
- Township: Kendall
- Elevation: 705 ft (215 m)
- Time zone: UTC-6 (Central (CST))
  - Summer (DST): UTC-5 (CDT)
- Area code: 630
- GNIS feature ID: 1802324

Ament Corners is an unincorporated community in Kendall County, in the U.S. state of Illinois.

The community was first settled in the early 1830s by the Ament brothers, and named for them.
