= Plattville, Illinois =

- Village
- Location of Plattville in Kendall County, Illinois.

- Location of Illinois in the United States
- Coordinates: 41°32′05″N 88°22′20″W
- Country: United States
- State: Illinois
- County: Kendall
- Township: Lisbon

Government
  - Mayor: June McCord (acting)

Area
  - Total: 2.26 sq mi (5.85 km^{2})
  - Land: 2.26 sq mi (5.85 km^{2})
  - Water: 0 sq mi (0.00 km^{2})
- Elevation: 600 ft (180 m)

Population (2020)
  - Total: 220
  - Density: 97/sq mi (37.6/km^{2})
- Time zone: UTC-6 (CST)
  - Summer (DST): UTC-5 (CDT)
- ZIP code: 60560
- Area codes: 630 / 331/815
- FIPS code: 17-60391
- GNIS feature ID: 2399688

Plattville is a village in Lisbon Township, Kendall County, Illinois, United States, west of Joliet. As of the 2020 census it had a population of 220. The community was established in 1860 and named after founder Daniel Platt, who first built a home there in 1834 on the Frink and Walker stagecoach route between Chicago and Ottawa.

Plattville was officially incorporated in March 2006 and had an estimated population of 245 in 2007. Plattville's first mayor was George "Jerry" Friel, who died in 2009. He was instrumental in his role in incorporating the village of Plattville in the mid-2000s, and spent some of his own money to file the town's incorporation papers.

== Geography ==
Plattville is in south-central Kendall County, 17 miles (27 km) west of the center of Joliet but less than 1 mile (1.6 km) west of the city's western limits. The village is part of the Chicago metropolitan area. Yorkville lies to the north, and Lisbon lies to the southwest.

According to the 2021 census gazetteer files, Plattville has a total area of 2.26 square miles (5.85 km^{2}), all land.

== Demographics ==
As of the 2020 census there were 220 people, 71 households, and 54 families residing in the village. The population density was 97.39 inhabitants per square mile (37.60/km^{2}). There were 88 housing units at an average density of 38.96 per square mile (15.04/km^{2}). The racial makeup of the village was 89.09% White, 0.91% African American, 0.00% Native American, 0.91% Asian, 0.00% Pacific Islander, 4.09% from other races, and 5.00% from two or more races. Hispanic or Latino of any race were 9.09% of the population.

There were 71 households, out of which 33.8% had children under the age of 18 living with them, 60.56% were married couples living together, 5.63% had a female householder with no husband present, and 23.94% were non-families. 19.72% of all households were made up of individuals, and 7.04% had someone living alone who was 65 years of age or older. The average household size was 3.04 and the average family size was 2.68.

The village's age distribution consisted of 27.4% under the age of 18, 6.8% from 18 to 24, 17.4% from 25 to 44, 30.6% from 45 to 64, and 17.9% who were 65 years of age or older. The median age was 43.0 years. For every 100 females, there were 108.8 males. For every 100 females age 18 and over, there were 97.1 males.

The median income for a household in the village was $87,083, and the median income for a family was $95,000. Males had a median income of $68,125 versus $32,813 for females. The per capita income for the village was $40,353. About 7.4% of families and 17.4% of the population were below the poverty line, including 19.2% of those under age 18 and 0.0% of those age 65 or over.

Historical population
Census	Pop.	Note	%±
2010	242		—
2020	220		−9.1%
U.S. Decennial Census
