= Silver Springs State Fish and Wildlife Area =

Park in Kendall county, Illinois, US

- IUCN category IV (habitat/species management area)
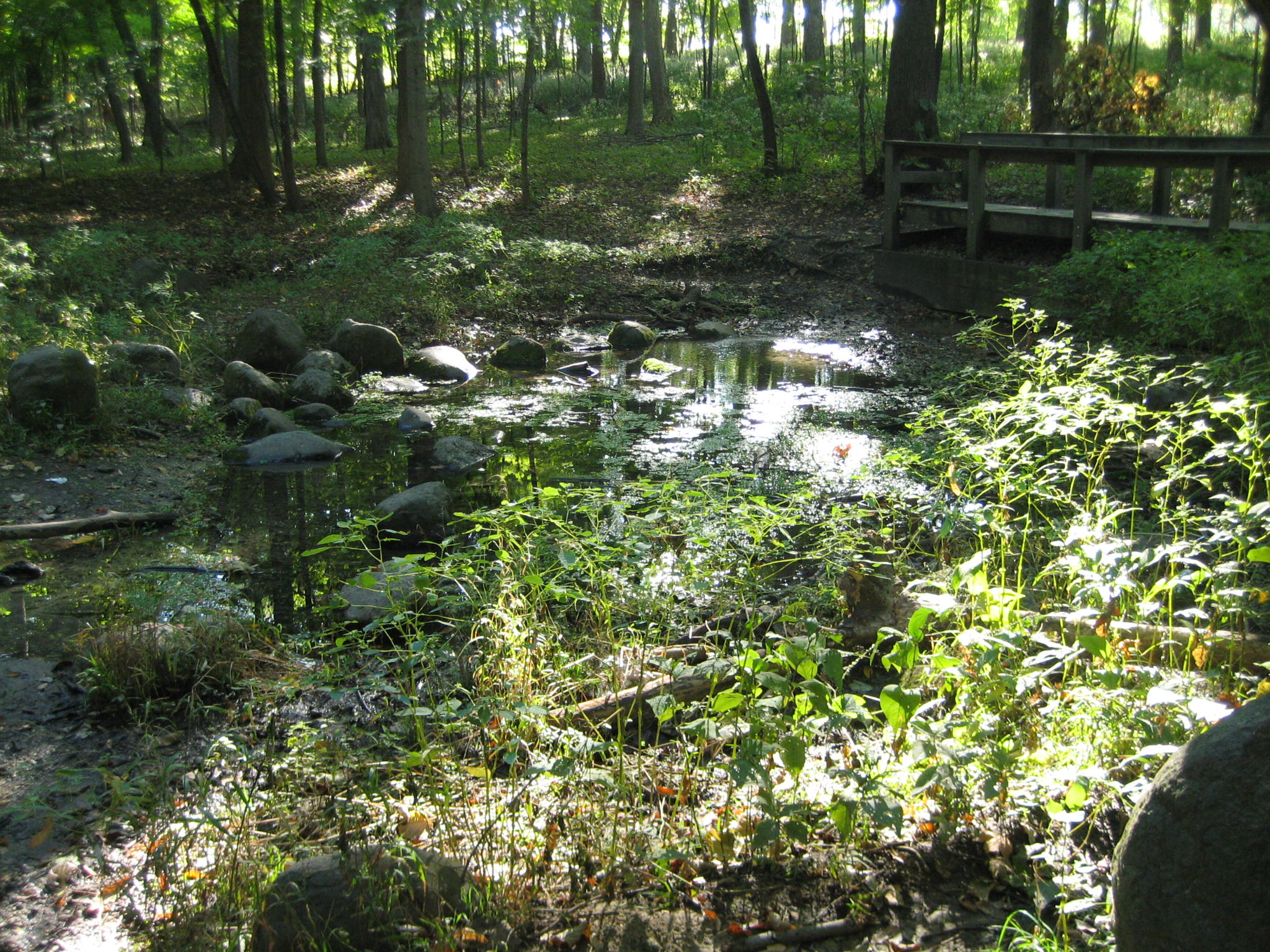
- Silver Springs

- Location within Illinois Location within the United States
- Location: Kendall County, Illinois, USA
- Nearest city: Yorkville, Illinois, Plano, Illinois, Millbrook, Illinois
- Coordinates: 41°37′39″N 88°31′21″W
- Area: 1,350 acres (550 ha)
- Established: 1969
- Governing body: Illinois Department of Natural Resources

Silver Springs State Fish and Wildlife Area is an Illinois state park on 1,350 acres (550 ha) in Kendall County, Illinois, United States. The park was established in the late 1960s and is named for the natural spring within its boundaries. The park has two artificial lakes and the Fox River flows through the northern end of the park. Silver Springs hosts a variety of activities including fishing, hunting, boating and hiking. The park has areas of native prairie restoration, a sledding hill and a seven-mile (11 km) equestrian trail. The prairie restoration areas hold many species of plants including lead plant, and purple coneflower.

== Location ==
The Park is divided by the Fox River, with the northern area situated next to the Edith Farnsworth House, designed by Ludwig Mies van der Rohe. The property that Mrs. Farnsworth bought frames part of the western side of the Park. One of the main access points to the park is a bridge that takes Fox River Drive (Ben Street in Plano), over the river, and to an adjoining road (Fox Road) that runs past the entrance to the park. In the 1960s when the current bridge was being constructed, Mrs. Farnsworth appealed to the Kendall County Board, suggesting a block to the bridge, citing ecological concerns among other things.

== History ==
There is evidence that the Fox River valley near Silver Springs was populated by indigenous people near the end of the last ice age, 10–14,000 years ago. The original 1,250 acres (510 ha) tract of land that became Silver Springs State Fish and Wildlife Area was purchased by the state of Illinois in 1969, and has been open since January of that year. The park is located in Kendall County, Illinois, five miles (8.0 km) west of the city of Yorkville. Since the original acquisition in 1969, 100 acres (40 ha) have been added to the park

Silver Springs State Fish and Wildlife Area was one of five new state parks opened in northern Illinois from 1969–1971. As part of more than 20,000 acres (8,100 ha) added to the Illinois state park system during this period, Silver Springs opened to alleviate traffic at other state parks in the area. At the time, the Illinois Department of Natural Resources (IDNR), which oversees the state park system, was attempting to provide the Chicago area with the most state park facilities in Illinois.

The park had nine extant wells tapping the Galena–Platteville Aquifer when the state purchased the property. By 1973 a modern well was drilled, reaching a depth of 120 feet (37 m). The well, located near the park entrance, was drilled by K & K Well Drilling Co. of Mokena, Illinois through black dirt, gravel, clay, and limestone. Upon completion, the well produced about 500 US gallons (1,900 L) per day during the summer. The well provides the park with water, but the other nine wells remained in use following its completion.

A prairie restoration project began on 30 acres (12 ha) within Silver Springs in 1980; 15 acres (6.1 ha) was added to the restoration project in 1991. The IDNR undertook another prairie restoration in an area within the park, on the north side of the Fox River, in 2002. For the 2002 project, the IDNR removed numerous invasive species from the area including: basswood, ash, maple, and exotic honeysuckle. The non-native exotic honeysuckle species had thrived in the absence of fire through human intervention. These actions were meant to allow native burr and black oak, and shagbark hickory a chance to reproduce.

== Bodies of water ==
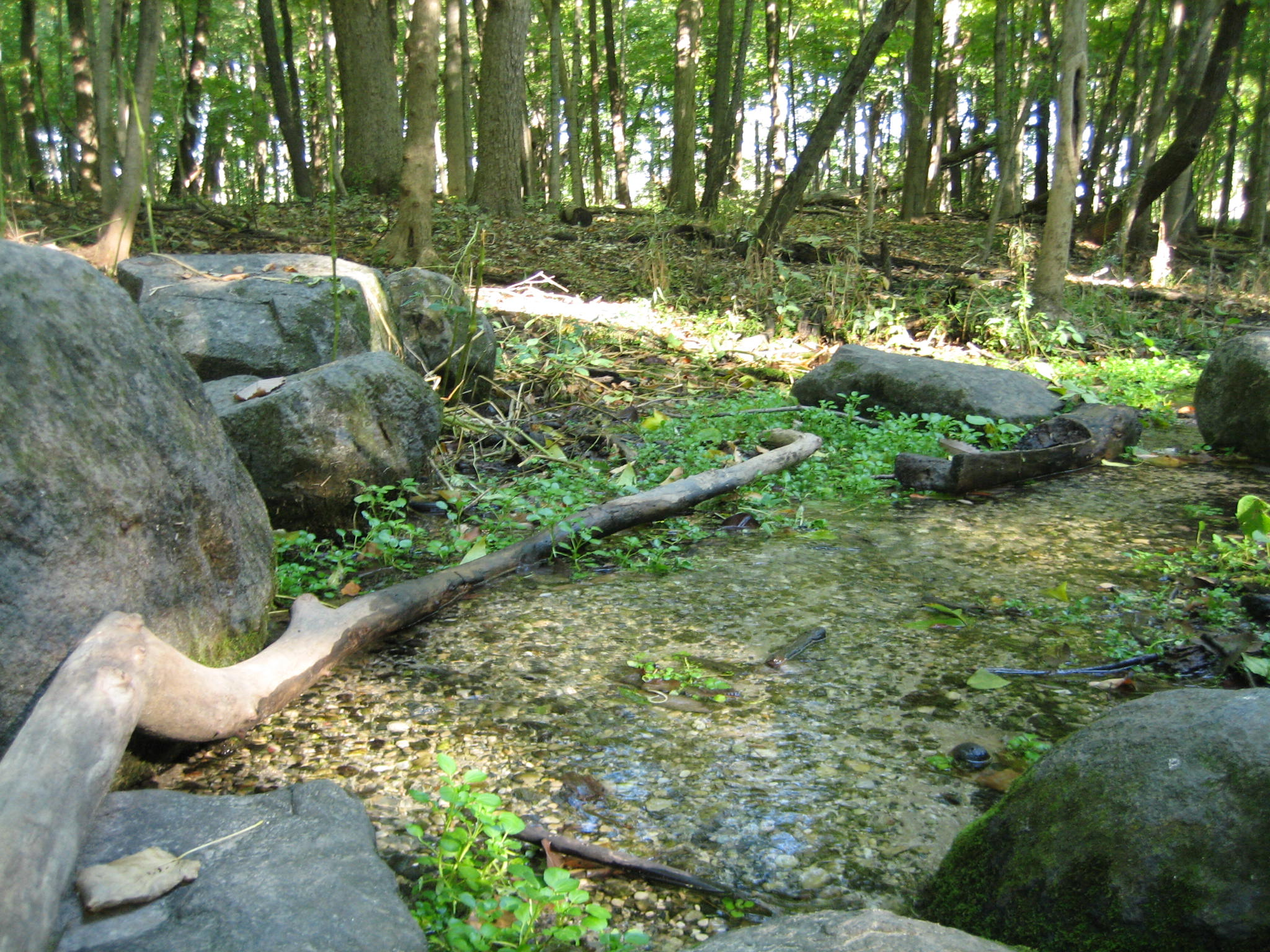
Silver Springs, a natural spring, and the park's namesake

Silver Springs State Fish and Wildlife Area covers 1,350 acres (550 ha) and includes four distinct bodies of water, two artificial lakes, the Fox River, and Silver Springs. The larger of the two lakes, Loon Lake, covers 21 acres (8.5 ha) and has 0.9 miles (1.4 km) of shoreline. Loon Lake's maximum depth is 20 feet (6.1 m) and it has an average depth of 11.8 feet (3.6 m). Loon Lake, sometimes known as Silver Spring Lake, was constructed in 1960 when a lowland area was excavated. The lake's water level is maintained through a small 20-acre (8.1 ha) watershed and groundwater seepage. Water quality at Loon Lake was identified as "good" in 1996 by the Illinois Environmental Protection Agency. Beaver Lake, north of Loon Lake, is smaller, covering 4.5 acres (1.8 ha). It has almost a half mile (800 m) of shoreline and a maximum depth of 14 feet (4.3 m); Beaver Lake's average depth is 8 feet (2.4 m).

The park's name comes from a natural spring located along a trail on the south end of the park. The spring's name is derived from the effect of sunlight on its surface, which makes the pool appear to shimmer like silver. Even through the winter, the bubbling spring never freezes, and plants often poke through snow surrounding the watercress-bordered pool in the coldest months. Three miles of the Fox River, which Silver Springs empties into, flows through the park's north end.

== Wildlife ==
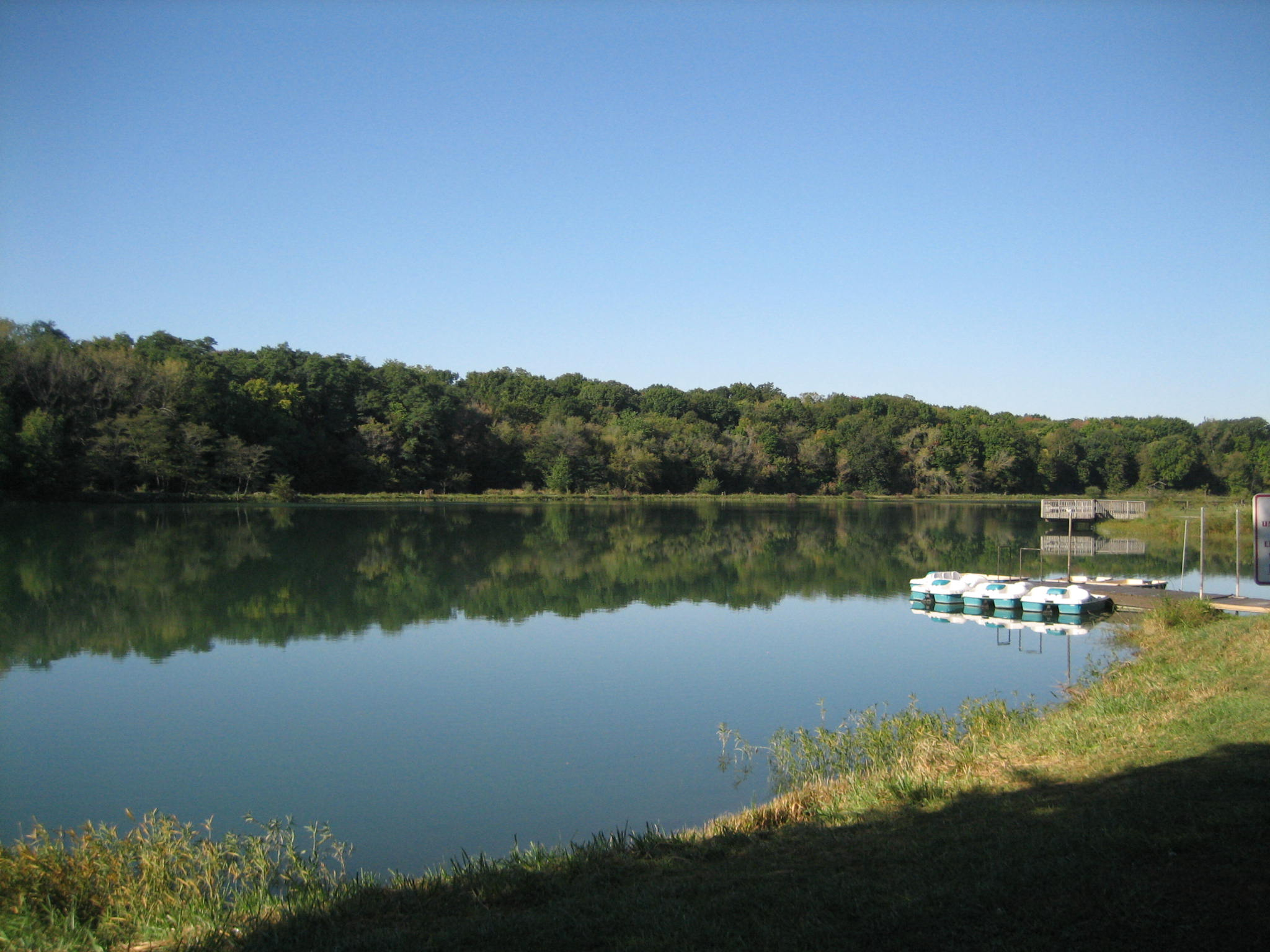
Twenty one acre (8 ha) Loon Lake is stocked with rainbow trout twice per year.

Plant species native to Illinois prairies prior to European settlement are found within the park's 45-acre (18 ha) prairie restoration. While the plant life varies by season, species observed in the park include: lead plant, purple coneflower, wild bergamot, and purple prairie clover, black-eyed susan, tall coreopsis, compass plant, wild quinine, rattlesnake master, New Jersey tea, big bluestem, switch grass, and Indian grass. Along the park's four miles (6.4 km) trail, several species of trees are found. Six species of oak, three species of ash, and basswood, cottonwood, pawpaw, Kentucky coffeetree and hackberry are among the tree species living within the boundaries of Silver Springs.

The Fox River at Silver Springs has numerous species of freshwater fish including, bluegill, crappie, channel catfish, bullhead, carp, muskie and northern pike. The Loon and Beaver Lake fish population is maintained through human stocking. Channel catfish, bass, bluegill and crappie are stocked in both lakes.

Besides its prairie restorations and bodies of water, Silver Springs has areas of deciduous forests, and wetlands, both of which are populated with species of mammals, birds and insects. Bird life observed in the park includes: osprey, great horned owl, eastern screech owl and long-eared owl; bald eagle have been sighted further upstream along the Fox. Reptiles and amphibians are present in the park but are more elusive than other types of animal life.

== Activities ==
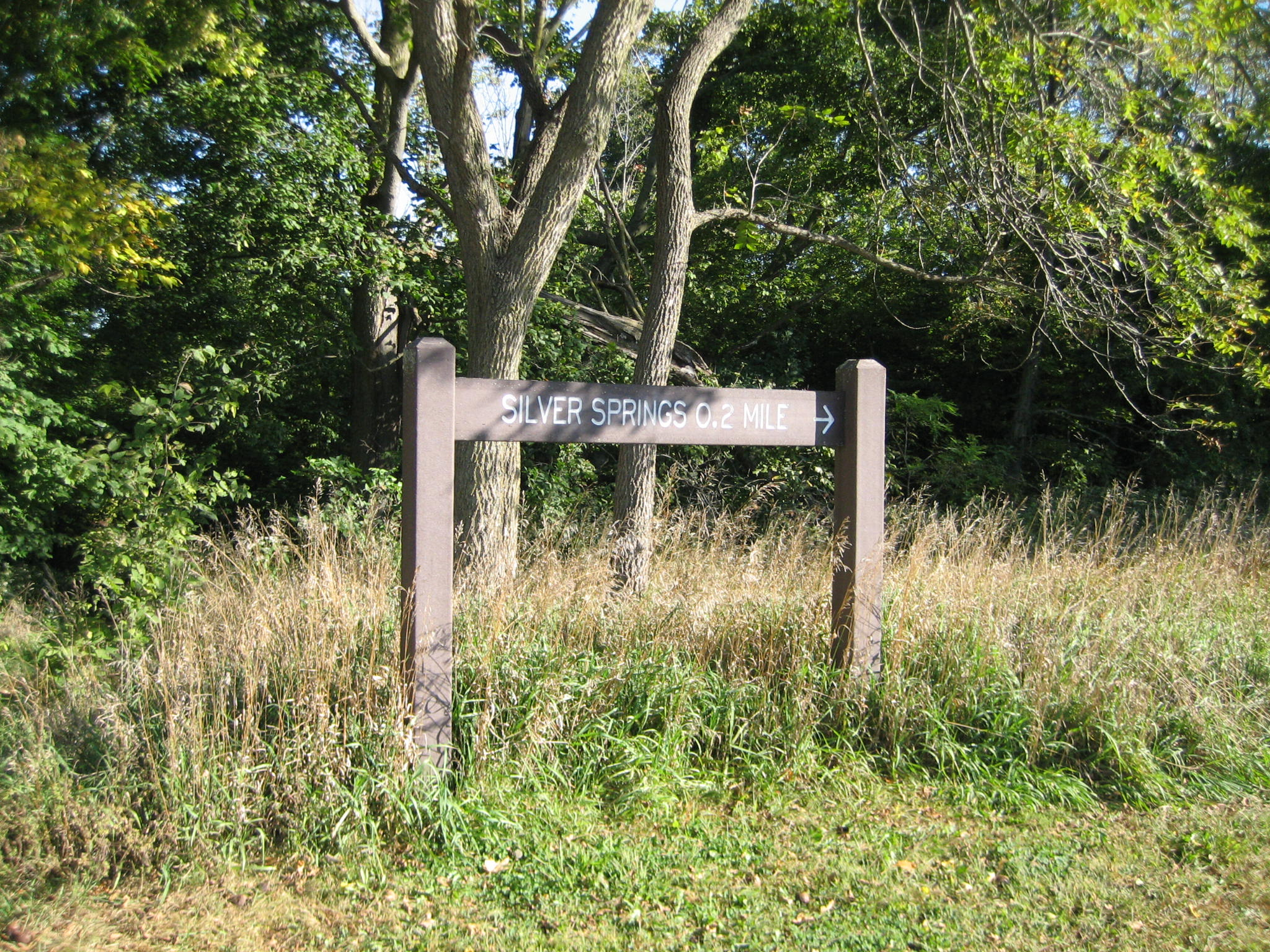
Trailhead leading to Silver Springs

When in season, hunting and fishing are two of the park's primary activities; during the fall and winter over 1,300 acres (530 ha) are opened to the public for hunting. Pheasant hunting, through a park operated controlled hunting program, is popular at the park. Dove hunting, squirrel hunting, and bow hunting for deer are also permitted with some restrictions. The park has areas set aside for trap shooting, and archery, participants are required to bring their own equipment and restrictions apply. For anglers, Loon Lake is stocked in the spring and fall with rainbow trout and a small one-half acre pond to the east of the lake is stocked annually for children during the National Hunting and Fishing Days, which is marked yearly by events at Silver Springs. The Fox River is open for fishing from both the bank and boats. There are no motor restrictions and a boat launch is available at the park. The Fox River is shallow near the park and boaters are advised to use caution.

Silver Springs State Fish and Wildlife Area has trails for hiking and horseback riding. A short, half mile (800 m) trail leads to Silver Springs near the park's east entrance. A longer, four miles (6.4 km) trail follows the course of the Fox River through the park's wooded areas. The equestrian trail is located in the wildlife management area of the park and stretches seven miles (11 km). A one-mile (1.6 km) path travels through the prairie restoration area as well. During the winter, much of the park's trail system is open to cross-country skiing, and a four-mile (6 km) trail is open to snowmobiling, weather permitting. When ice thickness permits, the lakes are opened to ice skating and ice fishing. Sledding is another popular activity; Toboggan Hill is located inside the park's east entrance.
