= Yorkville Community Unit School District 115 =

Public schools in Illinois, United States

Address
- 602 Center Parkway Yorkville, Illinois, 60560; United States

District information
- Type: Public
- Grades: PreK–12
- Superintendent: Dr. Matthew Zediker
- NCES District ID: 1743960

Students and staff
- Students: 6,369

Other information
- Website: www.y115.org

Yorkville Community Unit School District 115 is a school district headquartered in Yorkville, Illinois, and serving portions of Kane County and Kendall County in the suburbs of Chicago. In addition to Yorkville, its service area includes Bristol, Montgomery, Oswego, Newark, and Plano. The district territory covers a total of 85 square miles (220 km^{2}).

== History ==
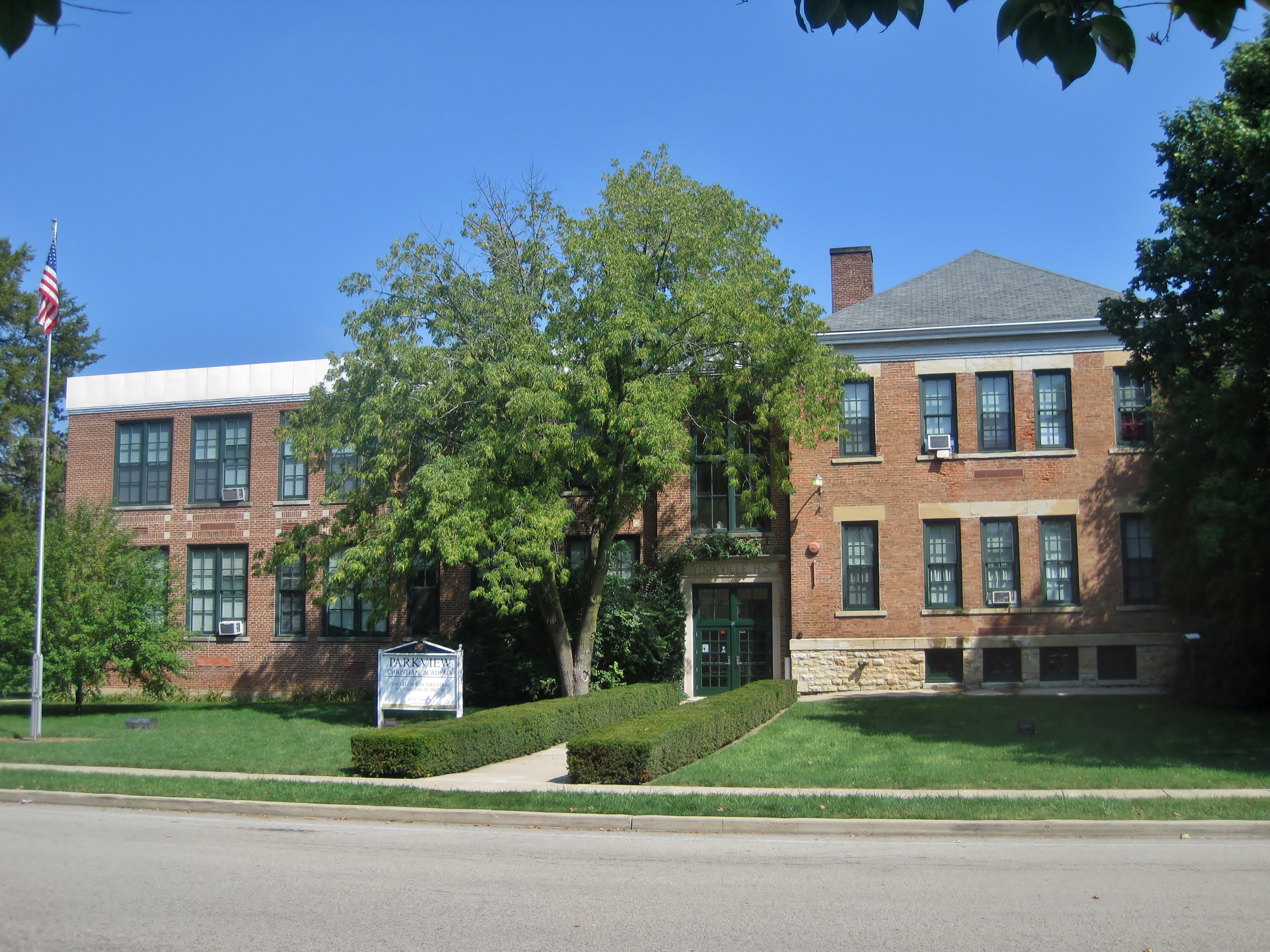
The historic Yorkville School, now known as Parkview Christian Academy

The Yorkville School was built in the mid 1880's as a result of Yorkville and Bristol's decision to form a school district. Yorkville High School was constructed in 1959. The historic Yorkville School is now the site of Parkview Christian Academy, a private school unaffiliated with the district.

Over the previous two decades the district's enrollment has approximately doubled and over the next few years it is expected to increase further. To address the issue the district spent 2 million dollars on the purchase of 106 acres of land west of the Yorkville High School which they have proposed to rezone and develop a second middle school on. District officials have also floated the idea of constructing other institutions, such as a new elementary school, on the large empty land.

== Schools ==
- Yorkville High School (2,217 students)
  - Yorkville High School Academy (Grade 9)
- Yorkville Middle School (7-8; 1,105 students)

Elementary schools (K-6):

- Autumn Creek Elementary (~650 students)
- Bristol Bay Elementary (~630 students)
- Grande Reserve Elementary (688 students)

Intermediate schools (4-6):

- Yorkville Intermediate School (~700 students)

Grade schools (K-3):

- Bristol Grade School (~250 students)
- Circle Center Grade School (~540 students)
- Yorkville Grade School (~200 students)

=== Early Childhood ===
- Yorkville Early Childhood Center (Serves children aged 3-5)

=== Other ===
- Yorkville Transition Program (Serves young adults 18-22 years old with disabilities)
