= Millington, Illinois =

- Village
- Location of Millington in Kendall County, Illinois
- Coordinates: 41°33′44″N 88°36′08″W
- Country: United States
- State: Illinois
- Counties: Kendall, LaSalle
- Townships: Fox, Mission, Northville

Area
  - Total: 0.76 sq mi (1.98 km^{2})
  - Land: 0.71 sq mi (1.83 km^{2})
  - Water: 0.054 sq mi (0.14 km^{2})
- Elevation: 564 ft (172 m)

Population (2020)
  - Total: 617
  - Density: 871.1/sq mi (336.32/km^{2})
- Time zone: UTC-6 (CST)
  - Summer (DST): UTC-5 (CDT)
- ZIP code: 60537
- Area code: 815
- FIPS code: 17-49308
- GNIS feature ID: 2399361
- Website: www.millingtonil.com

Millington is a village in Kendall and LaSalle counties in the U.S. state of Illinois. The population was 617 at the 2020 census, down from 665 at the 2010 census.

The Kendall County portion of Millington is part of the Chicago metropolitan area, while the LaSalle County portion is part of the Ottawa, IL Micropolitan Statistical Area.

== History ==
In the fall of 1834 the nucleus of the village was begun when George Markley and Samuel Jackson staked out the first claim and built a log cabin on the river bank near the house where Sam Adams now lives(408 Church St.). They claimed some 600 acres on both sides of the river and the next spring the dam to furnish waterpower for a sawmill which was also begun in 1835. The mill was located on the south side of the river.

Samuel Jackson came from Pennsylvania. A loyal Democrat, he supported the presidential campaign of Andrew Jackson with such vigor that he wore the nickname of “General” for the rest of his life. He was a member of the County Commissioners Court of Kendall County when the new court buildings were built. He married Eunice Tubbs.

The Millington Newark Cemetery is located on Church Street on the southern edge of the village, on top of the hill overlooking the village center. It is populated with over 3,000 graves, including a Revolutionary War veteran buried on the north side.

Samuel's brother, Jesse Jackson, came from Pennsylvania for a visit and was so pleased with the location that he bought out Markley's interest and moved his family here in 1836. His was the first frame house in Millington. That year the sawmill was completed and put into operation.

== Geography ==
Millington is in the western part of Kendall County and the northeastern part of LaSalle County at 41°33′43″N 88°35′59″W. In the 2010 census, 245 of Millington's residents lived in Kendall County and 420 lived in LaSalle County. The actual boundary line of the counties is not clearly defined in town, although a road farther south, named "Sandhill Road" in Kendall County and "N. 4201 Rd." in LaSalle County, clearly shows the county line, especially in the winter, as LaSalle County is slower in plowing the road, while the Kendall County portion is somewhat clear.

According to the 2021 census gazetteer files, Millington has a total area of 0.76 square miles (1.97 km^{2}), of which 0.71 square miles (1.84 km^{2}) (or 92.79%) is land and 0.06 square miles (0.16 km^{2}) (or 7.21%) is water. It lies mostly on the southeast side of the Fox River, except for a neighborhood along Belle Rive Drive on the northwest side of the river.

Millington is 2 miles (3 km) north of Newark, 7 miles (11 km) south of Sandwich, and 11 miles (18 km) southwest of Yorkville. Joliet is 30 miles (48 km) to the east, and Aurora is 22 miles (35 km) to the northeast.

== Demographics ==
Historical population
| Census | Pop. | Note | %± |
|---|---|---|---|
| 1880 | 255 | | — |
| 1890 | 301 | | 18.0% |
| 1900 | 286 | | −5.0% |
| 1910 | 223 | | −22.0% |
| 1920 | 212 | | −4.9% |
| 1930 | 208 | | −1.9% |
| 1940 | 248 | | 19.2% |
| 1950 | 270 | | 8.9% |
| 1960 | 309 | | 14.4% |
| 1970 | 338 | | 9.4% |
| 1980 | 439 | | 29.9% |
| 1990 | 470 | | 7.1% |
| 2000 | 458 | | −2.6% |
| 2010 | 665 | | 45.2% |
| 2020 | 617 | | −7.2% |
U.S. Decennial Census

As of the census of 2020, there were 617 people, 257 households, and 190 families residing in the village. The population density was 811.8 inhabitants per square mile (313.4/km^{2}). There were 240 housing units at an average density of 315.8 per square mile (121.9/km^{2}). The racial makeup of the village was 92.54% White, 0.16% African American, 0% Asian, 0.97% American Indian and Alaska Native, and 4.86% from two or more races. Hispanic or Latino of any race were 4.38% of the population.

There were 257 households, out of which 40.1% had children under the age of 18 living with them, 53.3% were married couples living together, 4.3% had a female householder with no husband present, and 10.0% were non-families. 24.1% of all households were made up of individuals, and 5.4% had someone living alone who was 65 years of age or older. The average household size was 2.58 and the average family size was 3.01.

In the village, the population was spread out, with 26.4% under the age of 18, 5.7% from 18 to 24, 28.8% from 25 to 44, 33.2% from 45 to 64, and 10.0% who were 65 years of age or older. The median age was 37.5 years. For every 100 females, there were 145.2 males. For every 100 females age 18 and over, there were 144.9 males.

The median income for a household in the village was $74.063, and the median income for a family was $86,500. Males had a median income of $63,026 versus $32,500 for females. The per capita income for the village was $36,357. About 1.1% of families and 3.8% of the population were below the poverty line, including 3.5% of those under age 18 and 3.0% of those age 65 or over.

The community is served by the Newark Fire Department, the Kendall County Sheriff's Department (through the Newark Police), the Sheridan Volunteer Fire Protection District (for ambulance service).

The community is also served by Newark School District, (south of Pine Street in the community), Sandwich District 430 (north side of Pine Street to the border with LaSalle County and north of the Fox River), and Community District School District #2 (west of the LaSalle County Line, and south of the Fox River).
