= Yorkville High School =

Public school in Illinois, United States

Location
- 797 Game Farm Road; Yorkville, Illinois 60560; United States; 41°39′07″N 88°27′07″W

Information
- Type: Public secondary school
- Established: 1893
- School district: Yorkville Community Unit School District 115
- Principal: David Travis
- Teaching staff: 123.95 (on an FTE basis)
- Grades: 9–12
- Enrollment: 2,217 (2023-2024)
- Student to teacher ratio: 17.89
- Campus: Suburban
- Colors: Red and white
- Athletics conference: Southwest Prairie Conference
- Nickname: Foxes
- Website: yhs.y115.org

Yorkville High School, also known as YHS, is a public high school located in Yorkville, Illinois, a suburb of Chicago, in the United States. It serves grades 9-12 for the Yorkville Community Unit School District 115.

The school serves Yorkville, Bristol, Montgomery, Oswego, and Plano.

== History ==
In 2008, the Yorkville High School Academy opened across the street from the high school. It serves as a freshman campus, while the high school remains for grades 10th through 12th.

== Athletics ==
The Yorkville Foxes compete in the Southwest Prairie Conference. The school colors are red and white. The following Illinois High School Association (IHSA) sanctioned sports are offered:

- Baseball (boys)
- Basketball (girls and boys)
- Bowling (girls and boys)
- Competitive Cheerleading (girls)
- Cross country (girls and boys)
  - Girls state champion - 2011, 2012, 2013, 2014, 2015
  - Boys state champion - 2013, 2014
- Football (boys)
- Golf (girls and boys)
- Dance Squad (girls)
- Soccer (girls and boys)
- Softball (girls)
- Swimming (girls and boys)
- Tennis (girls and boys)
- Track (girls and boys)
- Volleyball (girls)
- Wrestling (boys)
  - State champion - 1976, 1993, 1994

Yorkville formerly competed in the Northern Illinois Big 12 Conference, Western Sun Conference, The Little Seven Conference, and the Suburban Prairie Conference.

== Notable people ==
- Jon Blackman - Tight End/Left Tackle who played in the NFL and defunct XFL, class of 1993
- Dennis "Denny" Hastert - Former U.S. representative and speaker of the House, and convicted felon, taught and coached at the school
- Mike Radja - Professional ice hockey player, class of 2003
- Andy Richter - Comedian, actor and writer, class of 1984
- Yuki Yuen - Journalist in Hong Kong, senior anchor and feature group reporter of TVB News.
