= Kendall County Courthouse (Illinois) =

- U.S. National Register of Historic Places
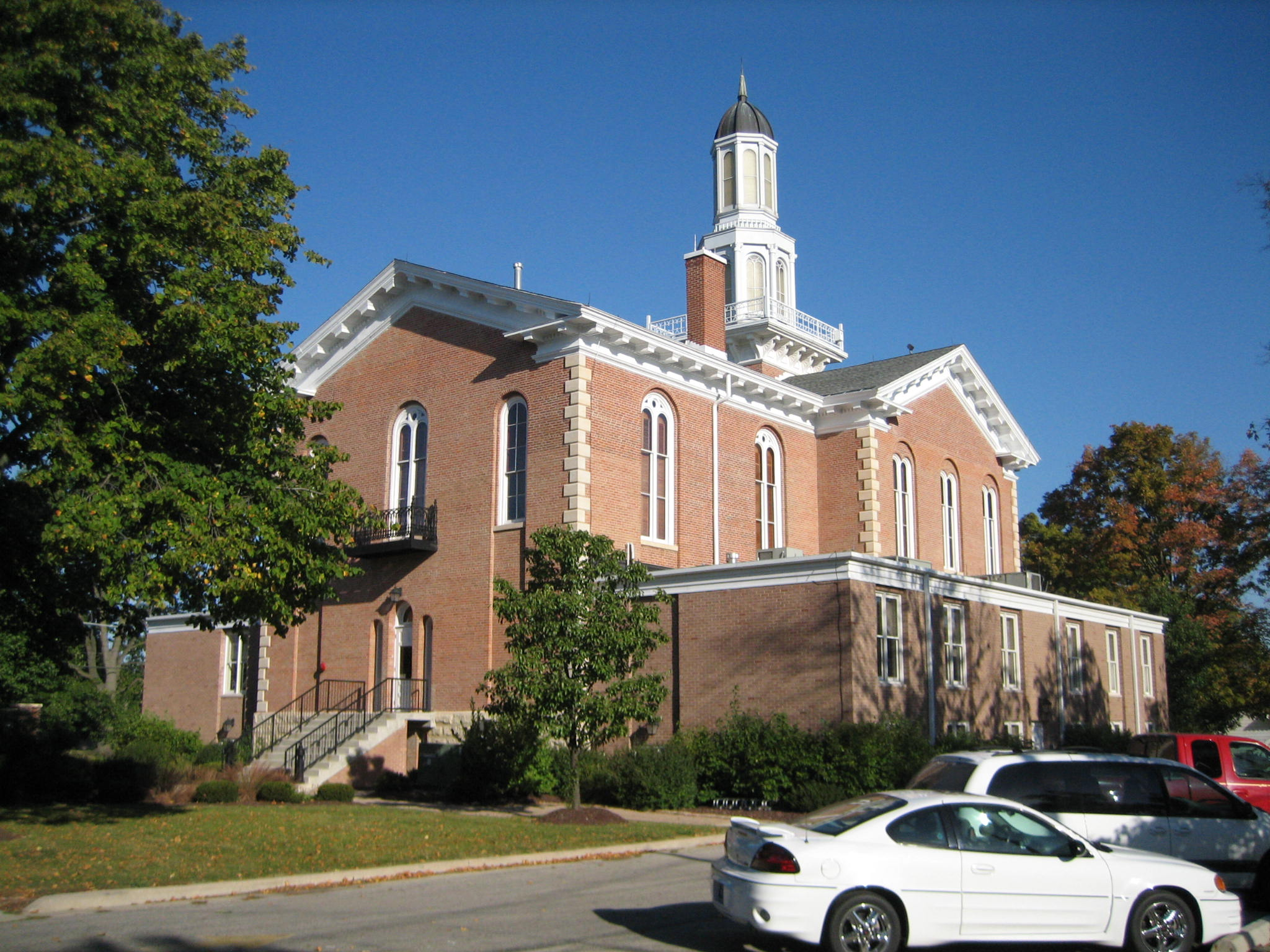

- Location within Illinois Location within the United States
- Interactive map showing the location of Kendall County Courthouse
- Location: 109 W. Ridge St., Yorkville, Illinois
- Coordinates: 41°38′25″N 88°26′52″W
- Area: less than one acre
- Built: 1862–64; 1887
- Architect: O.S. Kinnie (1862); Henry Hebard (1887)
- Architectural style: Italianate
- NRHP reference No.: 98001354
- Added to NRHP: November 12, 1998

The Kendall County Courthouse is a former courthouse in Yorkville, Kendall County, Illinois, United States. The original building was completed in 1864 but was later destroyed by fire. A replica of the Italianate structure was erected in 1887. The building was added to the National Register of Historic Places in 1998.

== History ==
Construction on the Kendall County Courthouse began in 1862 in Yorkville, Illinois on a bluff overlooking the Fox River. The limestone and brick building was completed in 1864 and went into service as the primary judiciary building for Kendall County. The original completed structure stood four and a half stories tall including its two-story cupola.

At about 4 a.m on March 25, 1887 the courthouse was struck by fire. Yorkville, without a fire department at the time, was forced to rely upon railroad water cars from nearby Aurora to extinguish any blazes. Citizens of Yorkville rescued the sheriff, his family and two prisoners being held in the jail. Though the exact cause of the fire was never determined, it is believed to have started in a coal stove in the sheriff's residence. The railroad cars did not arrive to Yorkville in time and the building was almost completely destroyed. The fire left only the exterior walls standing.

After the fire the interior of the building was redesigned and the building reconstructed. The roof was topped with a one-story domed capital. The dome was removed in 1920 because of continued problems with water leakage. The population of Kendall County grew and in 1958 the courthouse expanded with the addition of two wings to the building, on the east and west sides of the structure. The building stayed in use as the courthouse until 1998, when a new facility was built. The old Kendall County Courthouse then stood vacant until a restoration project started in 2000. The restoration included the installation of a replica of the cupola that was removed in 1920 and renovation of the historic courtroom. As of 2008, the courtroom and some meeting room serves as rental space for reunions and conferences.

== Architecture ==
The original building was a prominent example of Italianate architecture which the 1887 rebuild was designed to replicate. The original design was drafted by architect O.S. Kinnie, he died in 1869 and is credited with designing dozens of courthouses and public buildings in Ohio, Illinois and Indiana. No photos of the original building exist and the known descriptions come from new reports and government meeting minutes. The redesign was done by Henry Hebbard.

== Historic significance ==
The Kendall County Courthouse is locally important for its contributions to government and politics in the area. Many decisions were made within the building that shaped the future of Kendall County. The courthouse was added to the U.S. National Register of Historic Places on November 12, 1998.

== See also ==
- National Register of Historic Places listings in Kendall County, Illinois
