= Bristol Township, Illinois =

Bristol Township
- Township
- Location in Kendall County

- Kendall County's location in Illinois
- Coordinates: 41°41′14″N 088°26′19″W
- Country: United States
- State: Illinois
- County: Kendall
- Established: November 6, 1849

Area
  - Total: 28.74 sq mi (74.4 km^{2})
  - Land: 28.35 sq mi (73.4 km^{2})
  - Water: 0.39 sq mi (1.0 km^{2}) 1.34%
- Elevation: 640 ft (195 m)

Population (2020)
  - Total: 32,030
  - Density: 1,130/sq mi (436.2/km^{2})
- FIPS code: 17-093-08368
- GNIS feature ID: 0428711

Bristol Township is the smallest township in Kendall County, Illinois. As of the 2020 census, its population was 32,030 and it contained 10,839 housing units.

== Geography ==
According to the 2021 census gazetteer files, Bristol Township has a total area of 28.74 square miles (74.44 km^{2}), of which 28.35 square miles (73.43 km^{2}) (or 98.66%) is land and 0.39 square miles (1.01 km^{2}) (or 1.34%) is water.

U.S. Route 30 and U.S. Route 34 run east to west through the township. Yorkville covers much of the township.

The township is named after the Bristol family.

=== Cities and towns ===
- Montgomery (partial)
- Oswego (partial)
- Yorkville (majority)

=== Unincorporated towns ===
- Bristol

== Demographics ==
As of the 2020 census there were 32,030 people, 9,193 households, and 7,430 families residing in the township. The population density was 1,114.63 inhabitants per square mile (430.36/km^{2}). There were 10,839 housing units at an average density of 377.19 per square mile (145.63/km^{2}). The racial makeup of the township was 68.62% White, 8.15% African American, 0.43% Native American, 2.69% Asian, 0.01% Pacific Islander, 8.29% from other races, and 11.80% from two or more races. Hispanic or Latino of any race were 20.65% of the population.

There were 9,193 households, out of which 49.00% had children under the age of 18 living with them, 62.04% were married couples living together, 11.55% had a female householder with no spouse present, and 19.18% were non-families. 15.20% of all households were made up of individuals, and 4.70% had someone living alone who was 65 years of age or older. The average household size was 3.19 and the average family size was 3.54.

The township's age distribution consisted of 30.4% under the age of 18, 7.7% from 18 to 24, 32.5% from 25 to 44, 22.2% from 45 to 64, and 7.1% who were 65 years of age or older. The median age was 34.3 years. For every 100 females, there were 108.5 males. For every 100 females age 18 and over, there were 99.3 males.

The median income for a household in the township was $104,614, and the median income for a family was $105,830. Males had a median income of $61,001 versus $40,315 for females. The per capita income for the township was $36,234. About 2.7% of families and 4.9% of the population were below the poverty line, including 9.1% of those under age 18 and 3.9% of those age 65 or over.

Historical population
Census	Pop.	Note	%±
2000	7,677		—
2010	26,230		241.7%
2020	32,030		22.1%
U.S. Decennial Census

== Government ==
The township is governed by an elected Town Board of a Supervisor and four Trustees. The Township also has an elected Assessor, Clerk, and Highway Commissioner.
