= Lisbon, Illinois =

- Village
- Location of Lisbon in Kendall County, Illinois

- Location of Illinois in the United States
- Coordinates: 41°28′50″N 88°27′21″W
- Country: United States
- State: Illinois
- County: Kendall
- Townships: Lisbon, Big Grove

Area
  - Total: 2.12 sq mi (5.48 km^{2})
  - Land: 2.12 sq mi (5.48 km^{2})
  - Water: 0 sq mi (0.00 km^{2})
- Elevation: 627 ft (191 m)

Population (2020)
  - Total: 271
  - Density: 128.0/sq mi (49.44/km^{2})
- Time zone: UTC-6 (CST)
  - Summer (DST): UTC-5 (CDT)
- ZIP code: 60541
- Area codes: 815 & 779
- FIPS code: 17-43900
- GNIS feature ID: 2398449
- Wikimedia Commons: Lisbon, Illinois

Lisbon is a village in Kendall County, Illinois, United States. The population was 271 at the 2020 census.

The community was established in 1836 with a log tavern and a highway connecting Joliet to Chicago Road. This led to the addition of a post office, an enterprise, and a schoolhouse. The town became part of Kendall County in 1841.

John Moore is credited with naming Lisbon Township after Lisbon, Portugal.

According to Joseph R. Adams in the May 28, 1896, edition of the Kendall County News, "Though ten miles from a railroad, the villagers appear not wanting. They appear to be living better and happier than those differently situated."

Lisbon is now home to Lisbon Consolidated School, the John Moore Park, West Lisbon Church, and Lisbon Bethlehem Lutheran Church.

== Geography ==
Lisbon is located in southern Kendall County at 41°28′50″N 88°28′58″W (41.480600, -88.482740). It is 12 miles (19 km) south of Yorkville, the county seat, and 22 miles (35 km) west of Joliet. U.S. Route 52 passes through the north side of the village, leading east to Joliet and west 32 miles (51 km) to Troy Grove.

According to the 2021 census gazetteer files, Lisbon has a total area of 2.12 square miles (5.49 km^{2}), all land.

== Demographics ==
Historical population
Census	Pop.	Note	%±
1880	216		—
1900	279		—
1910	197		−29.4%
1920	205		4.1%
1930	145		−29.3%
1940	206		42.1%
1950	183		−11.2%
1960	234		27.9%
1970	261		11.5%
1980	259		−0.8%
1990	216		−16.6%
2000	248		14.8%
2010	285		14.9%
2020	271		−4.9%
U.S. Decennial Census

As of the 2020 census there were 271 people, 98 households, and 68 families residing in the village. The population density was 128.01 inhabitants per square mile (49.42/km^{2}). There were 111 housing units at an average density of 52.43 per square mile (20.24/km^{2}). The racial makeup of the village was 95.57% White, 0.00% African American, 0.00% Native American, 0.37% Asian, 0.00% Pacific Islander, 1.48% from other races, and 2.58% from two or more races. Hispanic or Latino of any race were 3.32% of the population.

There were 98 households, out of which 39.8% had children under the age of 18 living with them, 64.29% were married couples living together, 4.08% had a female householder with no husband present, and 30.61% were non-families. 25.51% of all households were made up of individuals, and 18.37% had someone living alone who was 65 years of age or older. The average household size was 3.59 and the average family size was 2.87.

The village's age distribution consisted of 31.7% under the age of 18, 10.3% from 18 to 24, 28.4% from 25 to 44, 13.2% from 45 to 64, and 16.4% who were 65 years of age or older. The median age was 29.4 years. For every 100 females, there were 103.6 males. For every 100 females age 18 and over, there were 113.3 males.

The median income for a household in the village was $63,750, and the median income for a family was $82,500. Males had a median income of $52,500 versus $21,667 for females. The per capita income for the village was $24,321. About 1.5% of families and 0.7% of the population were below the poverty line, including 0.0% of those under age 18 and 2.2% of those age 65 or over.

== Education ==
It is in the Lisbon Community Consolidated School District 90 and the Newark Community High School District 18.

== Notable people ==
- Washington Bushnell, Illinois politician
- John Dwyer, baseball player, catcher and outfielder for the Cleveland Blues
