= Little Rock, Illinois =

- Unincorporated community
- Location within Illinois Location within the United States
- Coordinates: 41°43′03″N 88°34′34″W
- Country: United States
- State: Illinois
- County: Kendall
- Township: Little Rock
- Established: 1836
- Elevation: 712 ft (217 m)
- Time zone: UTC-6 (CST)
  - Summer (DST): UTC-5 (CDT)
- ZIP code: 60545
- Area codes: 630 / 331
- GNIS feature ID: 412401 412401

Little Rock is an unincorporated community in Little Rock Township, Kendall County, Illinois. It is located in the far northwestern corner of the county. Big Rock lies to the northeast, Hinckley lies to the northwest, Plano lies to the southeast, and Sandwich lies to the southwest of the village.

The community originated as a stagecoach stop along Galena Road (also known as Chicago Road to the west of Little Rock). The community is named for Little Rock Creek, which flows on the community's western side.
