= Jon Blackman =

American football player (born 1975)

Jon Blackman “That Man”
No. 84,71
- Position: Tight end / Offensive tackle

Personal information
- Born: October 8, 1975 (age 51); Yorkville, Illinois, U.S.
- Listed height: 6 ft 8 in (2.03 m)
- Listed weight: 271 lb (123 kg)

Career information
- High school: Yorkville
- College: Purdue
- NFL draft: 1998: undrafted

Career history
- Detroit Lions (1998)*; Indianapolis Colts (1998); Philadelphia Eagles (2000)*; Denver Broncos (2000)*; Berlin Thunder (2000); Carolina Panthers (2000–2001)*; Las Vegas Outlaws (2001)
- * Offseason or practice squad member only

Jon Blackman (born October 8, 1975) is an American former professional football player. He played college football as a tight end for the Purdue Boilermakers. He was a member of the Detroit Lions, Indianapolis Colts, Philadelphia Eagles, and the Las Vegas Outlaws of the XFL. He is a father of two.

== High school ==
Jon Blackman attended Yorkville High School. He was named #1 prospect by the Chicago Sun Times and Most Valuable Player in the Little Seven Conference his senior season (93). Blackman also was a member of the basketball team earning 2nd team all state honors as a sophomore averaging 23 points and 15 rebounds per game.

== Professional career ==
=== Detroit Lions ===
On April 27, 1998, Jon Blackman was signed as an undrafted free agent. He was waived by the Detroit Lions on August 4, 1998.

=== Indianapolis Colts ===
On September 7, 1998, he was signed to the Indianapolis Colts practice squad. Was signed to active roster on December 1, 1998

=== Philadelphia Eagles ===
Blackman signed as a free agent by the Philadelphia Eagles in 1999.

=== Las Vegas Outlaws ===
Blackman was selected in the 2000 XFL Supplemental draft by the Las Vegas Outlaws. His position was changed from tight end to offensive tackle.
