= Mike Radja =

American ice hockey player

- Born: March 7, 1985 (age 41) Yorkville, Illinois, U.S.
- Height: 6 ft 0 in (183 cm)
- Weight: 180 lb (82 kg; 12 st 12 lb)
- Position: Forward
- Shoots: Left
- team Former teams: Free agent Syracuse Crunch; Rockford IceHogs; TPS; Bridgeport Sound Tigers; Augsburger Panther; Binghamton Senators; Peoria Rivermen; Houston Aeros; Nippon Paper Cranes; High1; Belfast Giants; Elmira Jackals; Anyang Halla
- NHL draft: Undrafted
- Playing career: 2008–present

Mike Radja (born March 7, 1985) is an American professional ice hockey forward who is currently a free agent. Radja previously played for Anyang Halla of the Asia League Ice Hockey. In Europe, he played for HC TPS in the Liiga, Augsburger Panther in the Deutsche Eishockey Liga and the Belfast Giants in the Elite Ice Hockey League.

== Playing career ==
Radja was raised in Yorkville, Illinois and graduated from Yorkville High School in 2003. Radja played two seasons of junior hockey for the Waterloo Black Hawks of the USHL. While at Waterloo Radja played with his future University of New Hampshire teammate Kevin Regan. Radja scored a key goal in the game which clinched the Black Hawks' victory in the 2004 Clark Cup.

He attended the University of New Hampshire from 2004 to 2008. In December 2006 he suffered a knee injury which caused him to miss a month of play. He made a quick recovery, however. In 2008 he was suspended for two games after an incident in which he was briefly detained by police while visiting T. J. Oshie after a game against North Dakota. That season proved to be a successful one for Radja, he was selected for the Hockey East All Star team and was the National College Hockey Player of the month in February 2008.

After leaving UNH, he briefly played for the Syracuse Crunch of the AHL at the end of 2007–08 season. The next year he played in eight games with the Fresno Falcons of the ECHL before spending most of the season with the Rockford IceHogs of the AHL. In the 2009–10 season Radja played in twenty five games in Finland with TPS of the SM-liiga before returning to North America to play for the Syracuse Crunch and Bridgeport Sound Tigers in the AHL. The next year Radja returned to Europe to play for the Augsburger Panther of the Deutsche Eishockey Liga. On January 13, 2012 Radja signed with the Houston Aeros of the American Hockey League.

After four seasons abroad, Radja opted to continue his professional career back in North America, signing a one-year ECHL contract in a return with the Elmira Jackals on August 4, 2016.

== Career statistics ==
			Regular season					Playoffs
Season	Team	League	GP	G	A	Pts	PIM	GP	G	A	Pts	PIM
2002–03	Waterloo Black Hawks	USHL	56	17	16	33	45	6	0	2	2	4
2003–04	Waterloo Black Hawks	USHL	55	17	23	40	46	10	3	5	8	4
2004–05	U. of New Hampshire	HE	42	8	12	20	28	—	—	—	—	—
2005–06	U. of New Hampshire	HE	38	8	9	17	26	—	—	—	—	—
2006–07	U. of New Hampshire	HE	33	19	18	37	12	—	—	—	—	—
2007–08	U. of New Hampshire	HE	36	19	24	43	32	—	—	—	—	—
2007–08	Syracuse Crunch	AHL	2	0	3	3	0	—	—	—	—	—
2008–09	Fresno Falcons	ECHL	8	7	6	13	4	—	—	—	—	—
2008–09	Rockford IceHogs	AHL	57	11	12	23	20	1	0	0	0	0
2009–10	TPS	SM-l	25	6	3	9	12	—	—	—	—	—
2009–10	Syracuse Crunch	AHL	31	7	7	14	12	—	—	—	—	—
2009–10	Bridgeport Sound Tigers	AHL	17	5	5	10	6	5	0	1	1	4
2010–11	Augsburger Panther	DEL	49	11	8	19	26	—	—	—	—	—
2011–12	Elmira Jackals	ECHL	46	31	21	52	30	10	3	5	8	4
2011–12	Binghamton Senators	AHL	3	0	1	1	2	—	—	—	—	—
2011–12	Peoria Rivermen	AHL	2	0	0	0	0	—	—	—	—	—
2011–12	Houston Aeros	AHL	18	2	4	6	0	—	—	—	—	—
2012–13	Nippon Paper Cranes	AL	42	28	37	65	64	4	2	3	5	6
2013–14	Nippon Paper Cranes	AL	42	35	37	72	40	7	2	7	9	4
2014–15	High1	AL	23	9	14	23	16	6	0	1	1	6
2015–16	Belfast Giants	EIHL	54	30	24	54	32	2	0	0	0	0
2016–17	Elmira Jackals	ECHL	22	4	7	11	8	—	—	—	—	—
2016–17	Anyang Halla	AL	18	9	10	19	10	6	2	1	3	4
AHL totals			130	25	32	57	40	6	0	1	1	4
AL totals			125	81	98	179	130	23	6	12	18	20

== Awards and honors ==
Award	Year
All-Hockey East First Team	2007–08
AHCA East First-Team All-American	2007–08
