= Little Rock Township, Illinois =

Little Rock Township
- Township
- Location in Kendall County

- Kendall County's location in Illinois
- Coordinates: 41°40′34″N 088°32′47″W
- Country: United States
- State: Illinois
- County: Kendall
- Established: November 6, 1849

Area
  - Total: 35.44 sq mi (91.8 km^{2})
  - Land: 35.23 sq mi (91.2 km^{2})
  - Water: 0.21 sq mi (0.54 km^{2}) 0.60%
- Elevation: 663 ft (202 m)

Population (2020)
  - Total: 14,036
  - Density: 398.4/sq mi (153.8/km^{2})
- FIPS code: 17-093-44043
- GNIS feature ID: 0429266
- Website: https://littlerocktownship.com/

Little Rock Township occupies the 6-mile (9.7 km) square (with the southeast corner nipped off by the Fox River) in Kendall County, Illinois. As of the 2020 census, its population was 14,036 and it contained 4,882 housing units. Little Rock is named after Little Rock Creek, which flows through the township. The largest settlement in the township is the city of Plano, from where the township is administered.

== Geography ==
According to the 2021 census gazetteer files, Little Rock Township has a total area of 35.44 square miles (91.79 km^{2}), of which 35.23 square miles (91.25 km^{2}) (or 99.40%) is land and 0.21 square miles (0.54 km^{2}) (or 0.60%) is water.

U.S. Route 34 runs east to west through the township.

=== Cities and towns ===
- Plano (majority)
- Sandwich (eastern edge)

=== Unincorporated towns ===
- Little Rock

== Demographics ==
As of the 2020 census there were 14,036 people, 4,869 households, and 3,564 families residing in the township. The population density was 396.08 inhabitants per square mile (152.93/km^{2}). There were 4,882 housing units at an average density of 137.77 per square mile (53.19/km^{2}). The racial makeup of the township was 61.16% White, 6.33% African American, 0.93% Native American, 1.65% Asian, 0.05% Pacific Islander, 15.40% from other races, and 14.46% from two or more races. Hispanic or Latino of any race were 33.97% of the population.

There were 4,869 households, out of which 39.60% had children under the age of 18 living with them, 46.11% were married couples living together, 18.71% had a female householder with no spouse present, and 26.80% were non-families. 24.80% of all households were made up of individuals, and 7.80% had someone living alone who was 65 years of age or older. The average household size was 2.87 and the average family size was 3.38.

The township's age distribution consisted of 25.1% under the age of 18, 8.2% from 18 to 24, 29.1% from 25 to 44, 25.5% from 45 to 64, and 11.9% who were 65 years of age or older. The median age was 35.4 years. For every 100 females, there were 103.9 males. For every 100 females age 18 and over, there were 113.3 males.

The median income for a household in the township was $82,119, and the median income for a family was $95,924. Males had a median income of $52,598 versus $34,498 for females. The per capita income for the township was $32,766. About 8.2% of families and 6.8% of the population were below the poverty line, including 7.2% of those under age 18 and 9.4% of those age 65 or over.

Historical population
Census	Pop.	Note	%±
2000	7,662		—
2010	13,076		70.7%
2020	14,036		7.3%
U.S. Decennial Census

== Government ==
The township is governed by an elected Town Board of a Supervisor and four Trustees. The Township also has an elected Assessor, Clerk, and Highway Commissioner.
