= Big Grove Township, Illinois =

Big Grove Township
- Township
- Location in Kendall County

- Kendall County's location in Illinois
- Coordinates: 41°29′37″N 088°32′56″W
- Country: United States
- State: Illinois
- County: Kendall

Area
  - Total: 35.73 sq mi (92.5 km^{2})
  - Land: 35.72 sq mi (92.5 km^{2})
  - Water: 0.01 sq mi (0.026 km^{2}) 0.02%
- Elevation: 751 ft (229 m)

Population (2020)
  - Total: 1,622
  - Density: 45.41/sq mi (17.53/km^{2})
- FIPS code: 17-093-05872
- GNIS feature ID: 0428670

Big Grove Township occupies the 6-mile (9.7 km) square in the southwest corner of Kendall County, Illinois. As of the 2020 census, its population was 1,622 and it contained 650 housing units.

== Geography ==
According to the 2021 census gazetteer files, Big Grove Township has a total area of 35.73 square miles (92.54 km^{2}), of which 35.72 square miles (92.51 km^{2}) (or 99.98%) is land and 0.01 square miles (0.03 km^{2}) (or 0.02%) is water. It contains Newark and portions of Lisbon.

U.S. Route 52 crosses the township east to west.

== Demographics ==
As of the 2020 census there were 1,622 people, 650 households, and 535 families residing in the township. The population density was 45.40 inhabitants per square mile (17.53/km^{2}). There were 640 housing units at an average density of 17.91 per square mile (6.92/km^{2}). The racial makeup of the township was 91.68% White, 0.00% African American, 0.55% Native American, 0.25% Asian, 0.06% Pacific Islander, 1.05% from other races, and 6.41% from two or more races. Hispanic or Latino of any race were 5.80% of the population.

There were 650 households, out of which 37.70% had children under the age of 18 living with them, 66.00% were married couples living together, 8.62% had a female householder with no spouse present, and 17.69% were non-families. 15.80% of all households were made up of individuals, and 10.80% had someone living alone who was 65 years of age or older. The average household size was 3.11 and the average family size was 3.42.

The township's age distribution consisted of 27.5% under the age of 18, 7.5% from 18 to 24, 24.7% from 25 to 44, 24.5% from 45 to 64, and 15.8% who were 65 years of age or older. The median age was 36.8 years. For every 100 females, there were 89.8 males. For every 100 females age 18 and over, there were 91.9 males.

The median income for a household in the township was $90,500, and the median income for a family was $98,281. Males had a median income of $53,068 versus $25,172 for females. The per capita income for the township was $33,807. About 2.8% of families and 7.6% of the population were below the poverty line, including 9.5% of those under age 18 and 2.8% of those age 65 or over.

Historical population
Census	Pop.	Note	%±
2000	1,526		—
2010	1,647		7.9%
2020	1,622		−1.5%
U.S. Decennial Census

== Government ==
The township is governed by an elected Town Board of a Supervisor and four Trustees. The Township also has an elected Assessor, Clerk, and Highway Commissioner.
