= Fox Township =

Fox Township may refer to:

- Fox Township, Kendall County, Illinois
- Fox Township, Jasper County, Illinois
- Fox Township, Black Hawk County, Iowa
- Fox Township, Platte County, Missouri
- Fox Township, Carroll County, Ohio
- Fox Township, Elk County, Pennsylvania
- Fox Township, Sullivan County, Pennsylvania
