= Newark Community High School =

Location
- 413 Chicago Road; Newark, Illinois 60541; United States
- 41°32′31.1″N 88°34′45.3″W

Information
- Other name: NCHS
- Type: Public high school
- Motto: Learning Drives Success
- School district: Newark CHSD 18
- Superintendent: Lane Abrel
- Principal: Tim Ulrich
- Teaching staff: 18.68 (FTE)
- Grades: 9-12
- Gender: Co-ed
- Enrollment: 178 (2023-2024)
- Student to teacher ratio: 9.53
- Colors: Blue; White
- Athletics conference: Little Ten Conference
- Team name: Norsemen and Lady Norsemen
- Website: www.nchs18.org

Newark Community High School is a public high school serving students from LaSalle, Kendall, and Grundy counties in Illinois. It is located in the town of Newark, in Kendall County. In the 2018–2019 school year, there was an enrollment of 161 students in grades 9–12.

== Special programs ==
Newark has a wide variety of special programs for students. These include video conferencing with real world experts, Capitol Forum at the state capitol, Civic and Personal Development, Podcasting, Learn And Serve Project, and many others. A unique graduation requirement is the need for each student to keep a four-year electronic portfolio of personal reflections, where the student critiques their performance and suggests methods of personal improvement.

== Athletics ==
Newark sport teams include baseball, softball, girls volleyball, boys and girls basketball, soccer, golf and cheerleading. They are a member of the Illinois "Little Ten" Athletic Conference. The team name is the "Newark Norsemen" ("Lady Norsemen" for girls' teams), a reference to the predominantly Norwegian original area settlers, and team colors are royal blue and white. In 2011, the Newark Norsemen boys' basketball team won the 1A State Championship, setting or tying six IHSA records in the final game and finishing the season with a 33–1 record. The team was proudly welcomed home from their victory by Newark residents, who staged a huge procession through the town of about 900, followed by a reception at the high school. In 2008, the Newark Lady Norsemen girls' basketball team advanced to the Illinois State finals, and many Newark residents made the trip to Redbird Arena in Normal, IL to watch them play. The Lady Norsemen captured second in state, an event which the entire town celebrated with an impromptu "Welcome Home!" parade and congratulatory reception. 2008 also saw the boys' basketball team as LTC Co-Champions In 2018, the Newark Lady Norsemen went to the RedBird Arena, and won the 1A state championship. In 2017, they had finished fourth in the Class 1A state championship, and the Lady Norsemen wanted a mantra to carry into 2018. They decided on MTR. The mantra, short for "Make Them Remember" turned out to be the girls mission. When they won state, it had been the first volleyball state title, and second crown, after the boys basketball championship in 2011. The Lady Norsemen won with 40 wins and only 2 losses.

== Clubs and organizations ==
FFA: The Newark FFA Club has been recognized as one of Illinois' leading chapters, having ranked second in the state in nine out of the last ten years. In 2008, they received national ranking and were selected as a 2-star winner in the national FFA Awards program. Some of the distinctive FFA activities at Newark include "Drive Your Tractor To School" day and the FFA Petting Zoo, which is held during FFA Week in February.

Other organizations: Newark has many other extracurricular events and organizations, including Choir, Band, Drama Club, National Honor Society, Earth Club, Kill Club, and Academic Teams.
