= Millbrook, Illinois =

- Village
- Location of Millbrook in Kendall County, Illinois

- Location of Illinois in the United States
- Coordinates: 41°36′26″N 88°32′43″W
- Country: United States
- State: Illinois
- County: Kendall
- Township: Fox

Area
  - Total: 1.85 sq mi (4.78 km^{2})
  - Land: 1.85 sq mi (4.78 km^{2})
  - Water: 0 sq mi (0.00 km^{2})
- Elevation: 627 ft (191 m)

Population (2020)
  - Total: 277
  - Density: 150.1/sq mi (57.94/km^{2})
- Time zone: UTC-6 (CST)
  - Summer (DST): UTC-5 (CDT)
- ZIP code: 60536
- Area code(s): 630, 331
- FIPS code: 17-49100
- GNIS feature ID: 2399351
- Wikimedia Commons: Millbrook, Illinois
- Website: www.thevillageofmillbrook.com

Millbrook is a village in Kendall County, Illinois, United States. It was incorporated on November 5, 2002, and had a population of 277 at the 2020 census.

The village is part of the Chicago metropolitan area.

== Geography ==
Millbrook is in western Kendall County on the southeast side of the Fox River. It is 7 miles (11 km) southwest of Yorkville, the county seat, 19 miles (31 km) southwest of Aurora, and 28 miles (45 km) west-northwest of Joliet. The village is bordered to the northeast by Silver Springs State Fish and Wildlife Area, along the Fox River.

According to the 2021 census gazetteer files, Millbrook has a total area of 1.85 square miles (4.79 km^{2}), all land.

== Demographics ==
Historical population
Census	Pop.	Note	%±
2010	335		—
2020	277		−17.3%
U.S. Decennial Census

As of the 2020 census there were 277 people, 121 households, and 93 families residing in the village. The population density was 150.05 inhabitants per square mile (57.93/km^{2}). There were 109 housing units at an average density of 59.05 per square mile (22.80/km^{2}). The racial makeup of the village was 93.50% White, 0.00% African American, 0.00% Native American, 0.00% Asian, 0.00% Pacific Islander, 2.17% from other races, and 4.33% from two or more races. Hispanic or Latino of any race were 6.14% of the population.

There were 121 households, out of which 41.3% had children under the age of 18 living with them, 69.42% were married couples living together, 3.31% had a female householder with no husband present, and 23.14% were non-families. 15.70% of all households were made up of individuals, and 9.92% had someone living alone who was 65 years of age or older. The average household size was 3.19 and the average family size was 2.95.

The village's age distribution consisted of 23.8% under the age of 18, 6.2% from 18 to 24, 22.6% from 25 to 44, 37.3% from 45 to 64, and 10.1% who were 65 years of age or older. The median age was 41.5 years. For every 100 females, there were 75.9 males. For every 100 females age 18 and over, there were 78.9 males.

The median income for a household in the village was $91,875, and the median income for a family was $112,569. Males had a median income of $60,893 versus $33,125 for females. The per capita income for the village was $36,605. About 6.5% of families and 9.3% of the population were below the poverty line, including 13.4% of those under age 18 and 5.6% of those age 65 or over.

== Points of interest ==
- Silver Springs State Fish and Wildlife Area
- Farnsworth House
- Millbrook United Methodist Church
