= Kendall County, Illinois =

County in Illinois, United States

- County
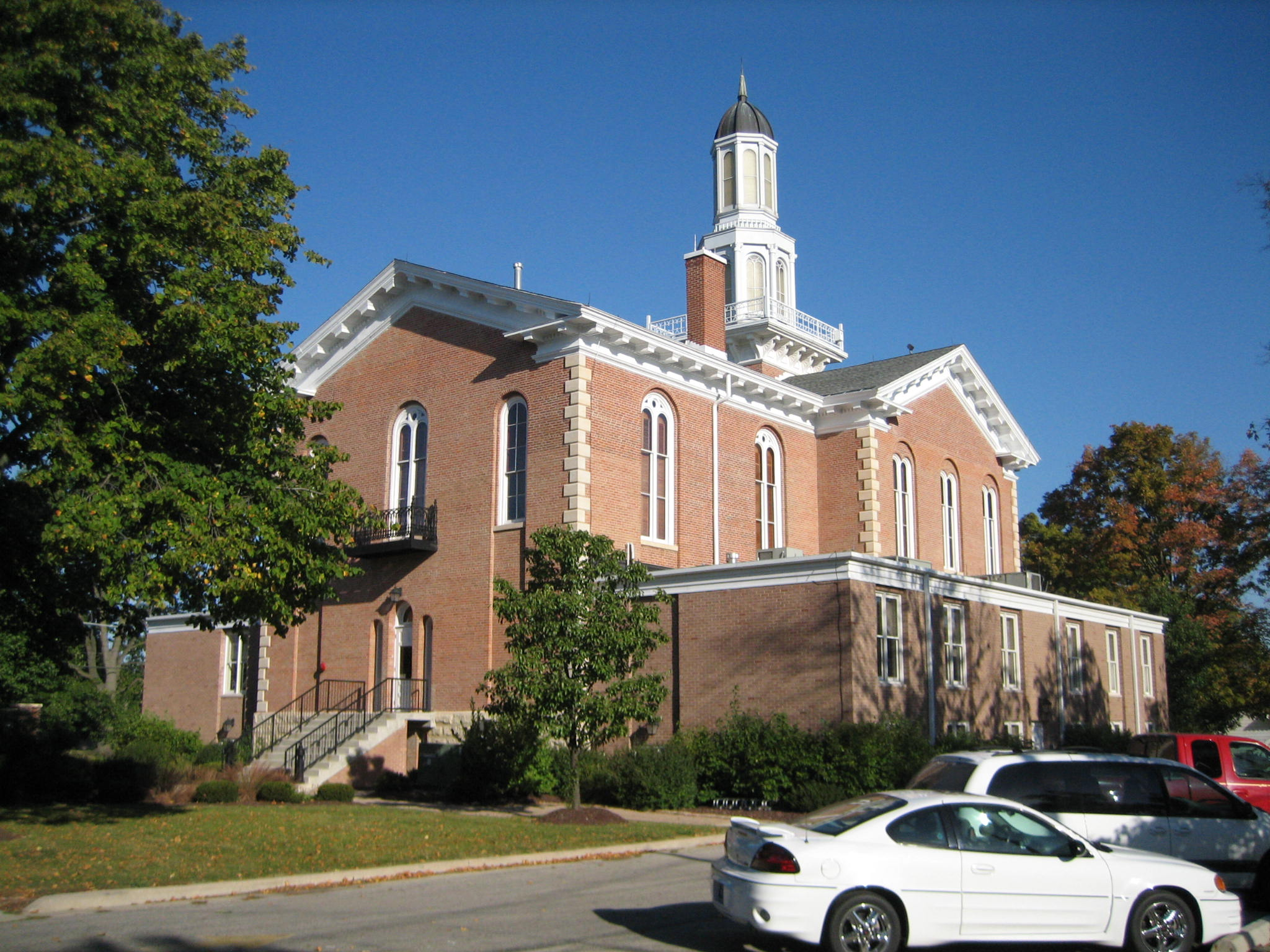
- Kendall County Courthouse

- Location within the U.S. state of Illinois
- Coordinates: 41°35′N 88°26′W
- Country: United States
- State: Illinois
- Founded: 1841
- Named for: Amos Kendall
- Seat: Yorkville
- Largest village: Oswego

Area
  - Total: 322 sq mi (830 km^{2})
  - Land: 320 sq mi (830 km^{2})
  - Water: 2.0 sq mi (5.2 km^{2}) 0.61%

Population (2020)
  - Total: 131,869
  - Estimate (2025): 145,470 ▲
  - Density: 410/sq mi (160/km^{2})
- Time zone: UTC−6 (Central)
  - Summer (DST): UTC−5 (CDT)
- Congressional district: 14th
- Website: www.kendallcountyil.gov

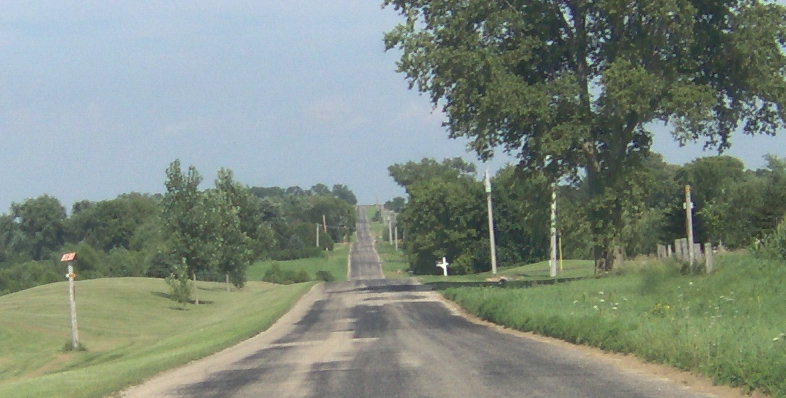
Terminal moraines, such as this one in central Kendall County, rise dramatically from the surrounding plain.

Kendall County is a county in the U.S. state of Illinois, within the Chicago metropolitan area. According to the 2020 census, it has a population of 131,869. Its county seat is Yorkville, and its most populous municipality is Oswego.

Kendall County is part of the Chicago metropolitan area and was the fastest-growing county in the United States between 2000 and 2010.

== History ==
Kendall County was formed in 1841 out of LaSalle and Kane Counties.

The county is named after Amos Kendall, who was the editor of the Frankfort, Kentucky, newspaper, and went on to be an important advisor to President Andrew Jackson. Kendall became the U.S. postmaster general in 1835.

=== Early settlement and Native American presence ===
Before European settlers arrived, the land that would become Kendall County was inhabited by several Native American tribes, including the Potawatomi, Fox, and Kickapoo. These tribes lived in semi-permanent villages along the Fox River and relied on hunting, fishing, and agriculture for their sustenance. The presence of these indigenous peoples influenced the early European settlers' interactions and land use practices.

=== Pioneer life and establishment of towns ===
The first European-American settlers arrived in the 1820s, primarily from New England and New York. They were attracted to the region's fertile soil and abundant waterways. These pioneers faced numerous challenges, including harsh winters, prairie fires, and conflicts with Native American tribes. Despite these obstacles, they established homesteads, farms, and small communities. Towns like Newark, Lisbon, and Plattville began to take shape, serving as centers of commerce and social activity for the burgeoning population.

=== Role in the Underground Railroad ===
Kendall County played a significant role in the Underground Railroad, a network of secret routes and safe houses used by enslaved African Americans to escape to free states and Canada. Abolitionist sentiments ran strong in the area, and many residents actively participated in assisting runaway slaves. Notable figures like the Lewis and Sackett families in Oswego provided shelter and support to freedom seekers, risking their own safety in the process.

=== Civil War and military contributions ===
During the American Civil War, Kendall County made substantial contributions to the Union cause. Hundreds of local men enlisted in the Union Army, serving in regiments such as the 36th Illinois Volunteer Infantry Regiment and the 104th Illinois Volunteer Infantry Regiment. Additionally, Kendall County residents organized relief efforts, raised funds, and supported families of soldiers serving on the front lines.

=== Industrialization and economic growth ===
The late 19th and early 20th centuries witnessed the rapid industrialization of Kendall County. The construction of railroads, particularly the Chicago, Burlington and Quincy Railroad, spurred economic development by facilitating the transportation of goods and materials. Industrial centers emerged in towns like Yorkville, Plano, and Sandwich, where factories, mills, and foundries produced agricultural implements, machinery, and other goods.

=== Impact of agriculture ===
Agriculture remained the backbone of Kendall County's economy well into the 20th century. The county's rich soil and favorable climate made it ideal for farming, especially for corn, soybeans, and dairy products. Family-owned farms and agricultural cooperatives played a crucial role in sustaining rural communities and providing food and commodities to urban markets.

=== Suburbanization and population growth ===
Following World War II, Kendall County experienced a population boom as suburbanization swept across the United States. Improved transportation infrastructure, including the construction of Interstate 88 and Interstate 55, facilitated commuting to nearby urban centers like Chicago. Subdivisions and housing developments sprang up throughout the county, catering to the needs of a growing population seeking the tranquility of suburban life.

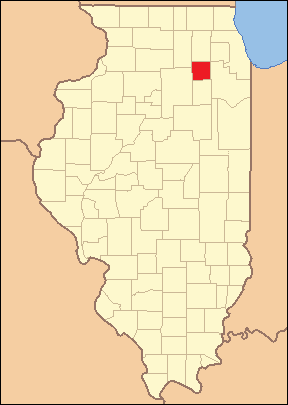
Kendall County at the time of its creation in 1841

== Geography ==
According to the U.S. Census Bureau, the county has an area of 322 square miles (830 km^{2}), of which 320 square miles (830 km^{2}) are land and 2.0 square miles (5.2 km^{2}) (0.6%) are covered by water.

Kendall County is a small but rapidly growing county that has the majority of its population in the northeast and along the Fox River (the only river in the county), which runs through the county's northwestern section. Many new subdivisions have been constructed in this county, which has produced considerable population growth. Southern Kendall still remains largely agricultural. Kendall County has two primary ranges of low-lying hills formed by what is known as an end moraine. Ransom, the more predominant of the two moraines, runs through the west and north-central part of the county. This moraine has created elevations over 800 feet (240 m), in contrast to elevations in southern Kendall County that drop to the lower 500-foot (150 m) range. Minooka, the other major end moraine ridge in Kendall County, runs along its entire eastern border with Will County. The two moraines intersect at almost a right angle in the township of Oswego. The county's only designated state park is Silver Springs State Fish and Wildlife Area.

=== Climate and weather ===
Yorkville, Illinois

Climate chart (precipitation, max. and min. temperature)
J	F	M	A	M	J	J	A	S	O	N	D
1.6 29 10	1.5 35 16	2.6 46 26	3.9 59 36	3.9 71 46	4.3 81 56	4.4 84 61	4.4 82 58	3.5 75 50	2.7 63 38	3.2 47 28	2.4 34 16
- █ Average max. and min. temperatures in °F
- █ Precipitation totals in inches
- Source: The Weather Channel
Metric conversion
J	F	M	A	M	J	J	A	S	O	N	D
41 −2 −12	39 2 −9	65 8 −3	99 15 2	99 22 8	110 27 13	112 29 16	111 28 14	89 24 10	69 17 3	81 8 −2	61 1 −9
- █ Average max. and min. temperatures in °C
- █ Precipitation totals in mm

In recent years, average temperatures in the county seat of Yorkville have ranged from a low of 10 °F (−12 °C) in January to a high of 84 °F (29 °C) in July, although a record low of −26 °F (−32 °C) was recorded in January 1985 and a record high of 111 °F (44 °C) was recorded in July 1936. Average monthly precipitation ranged from 1.52 inches (39 mm) in February to 4.39 inches (112 mm) in July.

=== Major highways ===
- Interstate 80
- U.S. Highway 30
- U.S. Highway 34
- U.S. Highway 52
- Illinois Route 25
- Illinois Route 31
- Illinois Route 47
- Illinois Route 71
- Illinois Route 126

=== Adjacent counties ===
- DeKalb County - northwest
- Kane County - north
- DuPage County - northeast
- Will County - east
- Grundy County - south
- LaSalle County - southwest

== Demographics ==
Historical population
Census	Pop.	Note	%±
1850	7,730		—
1860	13,074		69.1%
1870	12,399		−5.2%
1880	13,083		5.5%
1890	12,106		−7.5%
1900	11,467		−5.3%
1910	10,777		−6.0%
1920	10,074		−6.5%
1930	10,555		4.8%
1940	11,105		5.2%
1950	12,115		9.1%
1960	17,540		44.8%
1970	26,374		50.4%
1980	37,202		41.1%
1990	39,413		5.9%
2000	54,544		38.4%
2010	114,736		110.4%
2020	131,869		14.9%
2025 (est.)	145,470	▲	10.3%
U.S. Decennial Census; 1790-1960 1900-1990; 1990-2000 2010 2020

2000 census age pyramid for Kendall County

=== 2020 census ===
As of the 2020 census, the county had a population of 131,869. The median age was 35.8 years. 28.8% of residents were under the age of 18 and 10.9% of residents were 65 years of age or older. For every 100 females there were 96.8 males, and for every 100 females age 18 and over there were 94.0 males age 18 and over.

The racial makeup of the county was 68.4% White, 7.6% Black or African American, 0.6% American Indian and Alaska Native, 3.6% Asian, <0.1% Native Hawaiian and Pacific Islander, 8.1% from some other race, and 11.7% from two or more races. Hispanic or Latino residents of any race comprised 20.6% of the population.

88.6% of residents lived in urban areas, while 11.4% lived in rural areas.

There were 43,534 households in the county, of which 45.3% had children under the age of 18 living in them. Of all households, 62.1% were married-couple households, 11.9% were households with a male householder and no spouse or partner present, and 19.7% were households with a female householder and no spouse or partner present. About 17.0% of all households were made up of individuals and 6.7% had someone living alone who was 65 years of age or older.

There were 45,008 housing units, of which 3.3% were vacant. Among occupied housing units, 83.1% were owner-occupied and 16.9% were renter-occupied. The homeowner vacancy rate was 1.3% and the rental vacancy rate was 5.6%.

=== Racial and ethnic composition ===
Kendall County, Illinois – Racial and ethnic composition Note: the US Census treats Hispanic/Latino as an ethnic category. This table excludes Latinos from the racial categories and assigns them to a separate category. Hispanics/Latinos may be of any race.
Race / Ethnicity (NH = Non-Hispanic)	Pop 1980	Pop 1990	Pop 2000	Pop 2010	Pop 2020	% 1980	% 1990	% 2000	% 2010	% 2020
White alone (NH)	35,652	37,134	48,677	85,156	84,690	95.83%	94.22%	89.24%	74.22%	64.22%
Black or African American alone (NH)	180	205	693	6,343	9,693	0.48%	0.52%	1.27%	5.53%	7.35%
Native American or Alaska Native alone (NH)	44	46	84	129	117	0.12%	0.12%	0.15%	0.11%	0.09%
Asian alone (NH)	141	210	479	3,403	4,625	0.38%	0.53%	0.88%	2.97%	3.51%
Native Hawaiian or Pacific Islander alone (NH)	x	x	11	28	10	x	x	0.02%	0.02%	0.01%
Other race alone (NH)	61	13	45	91	487	0.16%	0.03%	0.08%	0.08%	0.37%
Mixed race or Multiracial (NH)	x	x	469	1,688	5,120	x	x	0.86%	1.47%	3.88%
Hispanic or Latino (any race)	1,124	1,805	4,086	17,898	27,127	3.02%	4.58%	7.49%	15.60%	20.57%
Total	37,202	39,413	54,544	114,736	131,869	100.00%	100.00%	100.00%	100.00%	100.00%

=== 2010 census ===
As of the 2010 United States census, 114,736 people, 38,022 households, and 30,067 families were residing in the county. The population density was 358.2 inhabitants per square mile (138.3/km^{2}). The 40,321 housing units averaged 125.9 per square mile (48.6/km^{2}). The racial makeup of the county was 83.6% White, 5.7% African American, 3.0% Asian, 0.3% Native American, 5.0% from other races, and 2.3% from two or more races. Those of Hispanic or Latino origin made up 15.6% of the population. In terms of ancestry, 28.0% were German, 16.0% were Irish, 9.5% were Polish, 9.4% were Italian, 7.5% were English, and 3.2% were American.

Of the 38,022 households, 47.9% had children under the age of 18 living with them, 65.8% were married couples living together, 9.2% had a female householder with no husband present, 20.9% were not families, and 16.4% of all households were made up of individuals. The average household size was 3.01, and the average family size was 3.41. The median age was 32.9 years.

The county's median household income was $79,897, and its median family income was $87,309. Males had a median income of $64,048 versus $42,679 for females. The county's per capita income was $30,565. About 2.9% of families and 3.9% of the population were below the poverty line, including 4.6% of those under age 18 and 3.4% of those age 65 or over.

Kendall County was listed as the fastest-growing county in the US from 2000 to 2009, experiencing a population growth rate of 110.4% in this period. The reason for this growth is heavy suburbanization from the metropolitan Chicago area.

== Communities ==
=== Cities ===
- Aurora (part)
- Joliet (part)
- Plano
- Sandwich (part)
- Yorkville (mostly)

=== Villages ===
- Lisbon
- Millbrook
- Millington (mostly)
- Minooka (mostly)
- Montgomery (part)
- Newark
- Oswego (mostly)
- Plainfield (part)
- Plattville

=== Census-designated place ===
- Boulder Hill

=== Other unincorporated communities ===
- Ament Corners
- Bristol
- Fox
- Helmar
- Little Rock

=== Townships ===
The county is an 18-mile (29 km) square, which is divided up into 9 townships. Each township is divided into 36 one-mile-square sections, except that the Fox River is used as a township border, resulting in Bristol being the smallest township with the extra area being assigned to Oswego and Kendall Townships. Two exceptions to the section grid reflect Indian land grants under the Treaty of Prairie du Chien in 1829: the Mo-Ah-Way Reservation in Oswego Township and the Waish-Kee-shaw Reservation in Na-Au-Say Township. These areas were eventually sold to European settlers.

- Big Grove Township
- Bristol Township
- Fox Township
- Kendall Township
- Lisbon Township
- Little Rock Township
- Na-au-say Township
- Oswego Township
- Seward Township

== Government ==
County board members run in two districts. All other officers run county-wide:

- County board members (District 1): Ruben Rodriguez, Scott Gengler, Brian DeBolt, Seth Wormley, Jason Peterson;
- County board members (District 2): Elizabeth Flowers, Brooke Shanley, Zach Bachman, Matt Kellogg, Dan Koukol;
- County board chairman – Matt Kellogg
- Forest preserve president – Brian DeBolt
- Circuit court clerk – Matthew G. Prochaska
- Coroner – Jacquie Purcell
- County clerk and recorder – Debbie Gillette
- Sheriff – Dwight Baird
- State's attorney – Eric Weis
- Treasurer – Jill Ferko

=== Politics ===
For years, Kendall County was one of the most Republican counties in Illinois. Between the 1856 and 2004 elections, the only time Kendall County did not give a plurality to the GOP presidential nominee was in 1912, when the Republican Party was mortally divided and Progressive Party candidate Theodore Roosevelt won 57.56% of the county's vote against conservative incumbent president William Howard Taft. Moreover, only one Democratic presidential candidate – Franklin Delano Roosevelt in 1932 and 1936 – ever cracked 40% of Kendall County's vote during this span of 38 presidential elections.

In 2008, Illinois native Barack Obama became the first Democrat to carry the county since Franklin Pierce in 1852. Obama did not repeat this feat against Mitt Romney in 2012, nor did Democrat Hillary Clinton in 2016.

Joe Biden won the county with a majority in 2020. Kamala Harris in 2024 became the first Democratic presidential nominee to carry the county despite losing the presidential election.

Kendall County is one of only thirteen counties to have voted for Obama in 2008, Romney in 2012, Trump in 2016, and Biden in 2020. (Note: The other twelve are Butte County, California; Teton County, Idaho; Kent County, Maryland; McLean County, Illinois; Tippecanoe County, Indiana; Kent County, Michigan; Leelanau County, Michigan; Carroll County, New Hampshire; Rockingham County, New Hampshire; Marion County, Oregon; Grand County, Utah; and Albany County, Wyoming.)

United States presidential election results for Kendall County, Illinois
Year	Republican		Democratic		Third party(ies)	
Year	No.	%	No.	%	No.	%
1892	1,691	59.46%	848	29.82%	305	10.72%
1896	2,128	71.51%	774	26.01%	74	2.49%
1900	2,121	72.04%	713	24.22%	110	3.74%
1904	2,120	78.84%	423	15.73%	146	5.43%
1908	1,948	73.87%	556	21.08%	133	5.04%
1912	534	20.14%	531	20.03%	1,586	59.83%
1916	3,316	75.38%	1,008	22.91%	75	1.70%
1920	3,459	87.99%	439	11.17%	33	0.84%
1924	3,513	79.68%	432	9.80%	464	10.52%
1928	3,589	75.53%	1,154	24.28%	9	0.19%
1932	2,749	52.77%	2,398	46.04%	62	1.19%
1936	3,138	54.86%	2,374	41.50%	208	3.64%
1940	4,200	67.79%	1,978	31.92%	18	0.29%
1944	4,022	70.55%	1,673	29.35%	6	0.11%
1948	3,925	71.77%	1,517	27.74%	27	0.49%
1952	4,982	77.11%	1,476	22.84%	3	0.05%
1956	5,057	78.15%	1,407	21.74%	7	0.11%
1960	5,975	72.62%	2,242	27.25%	11	0.13%
1964	5,710	62.47%	3,430	37.53%	0	0.00%
1968	7,184	70.45%	2,228	21.85%	786	7.71%
1972	9,373	78.65%	2,525	21.19%	19	0.16%
1976	9,011	67.50%	4,202	31.48%	136	1.02%
1980	10,028	69.99%	3,143	21.94%	1,156	8.07%
1984	10,872	73.81%	3,789	25.72%	69	0.47%
1988	10,653	70.62%	4,347	28.82%	84	0.56%
1992	8,521	46.29%	5,423	29.46%	4,462	24.24%
1996	8,958	50.69%	6,499	36.78%	2,215	12.53%
2000	13,688	60.12%	8,444	37.09%	637	2.80%
2004	19,776	60.80%	12,497	38.42%	254	0.78%
2008	21,380	45.75%	24,742	52.95%	609	1.30%
2012	24,047	50.71%	22,471	47.39%	900	1.90%
2016	24,961	46.18%	24,884	46.03%	4,210	7.79%
2020	29,492	45.93%	33,168	51.66%	1,545	2.41%
2024	31,970	48.04%	32,977	49.55%	1,602	2.41%

=== Property values ===
Kendall County was the fastest growing county in the US, more than doubling in population between the 2000 and 2010 censuses.

All five Kendall County communities analyzed saw their real home prices fall dramatically from 2007 to 2015, from a low of 17 percent in Montgomery to a high of 44 percent in Plano. Minooka and Oswego both saw their home values fall 34 percent. In Yorkville, they fell 36 percent.

== Education ==
K-12 school districts include:

- Hinckley-Big Rock Community Unit School District 429
- Oswego Community Unit School District 308
- Plainfield School District 202
- Plano Community Unit School District 88
- Sandwich Community Unit School District 430
- Yorkville Community Unit School District 115

Secondary school districts include:

- Minooka Community High School District 111
- Morris Community High School District 101
- Newark Community High School District 18

Elementary school districts include:

- Lisbon Community Consolidated School District 90
- Minooka Community Consolidated School District 201
- Newark Community Consolidated School District 66
- Saratoga Community Consolidated School District 60C

The northern half of the county is in Community College District 516 and is served by Waubonsee Community College in Sugar Grove, Aurora, and Plano. The southern half is in Community College District 525 and is served by Joliet Junior College in Joliet.

== In popular culture ==
Locations within and around the City of Plano were stand-ins for Clark Kent's hometown of Smallville, Kansas, in the 2013 film Man of Steel as well as the 2016 film Batman v. Superman: Dawn of Justice. Plano has also been used in the film Witless Protection, with both films having been filmed in Plano's historic downtown area. Filming has also taken place south of Plano at the Farnsworth House, a modern architectural landmark, for documentaries and commercials.

== See also ==
- National Register of Historic Places listings in Kendall County, Illinois
