= Kendall Township, Illinois =

Kendall Township
- Township
- Location in Kendall County

- Kendall County's location in Illinois
- Coordinates: 41°35′16″N 088°25′51″W
- Country: United States
- State: Illinois
- County: Kendall

Area
  - Total: 39.21 sq mi (101.6 km^{2})
  - Land: 39.07 sq mi (101.2 km^{2})
  - Water: 0.13 sq mi (0.34 km^{2}) 0.34%
- Elevation: 682 ft (208 m)

Population (2020)
  - Total: 8,532
  - Density: 218.4/sq mi (84.32/km^{2})
- FIPS code: 17-093-39454
- GNIS feature ID: 0429202
- Website: kendalltwp.com

Kendall Township is located in Kendall County, Illinois. As of the 2020 census, its population was 8,532 and it contained 3,152 housing units.

Kendall Township was named after the county, which was named after Amos Kendall, a powerful Democratic politician in the Andrew Jackson administration. Kendall later became a business partner of Samuel F.B. Morse, inventor of the Morse Code and the electric telegraph, and made his fortune with Morse.

Yorkville's division amongst Bristol and Kendall Townships mirrors the fact that, until the 1950s, The City of Yorkville was situated along the south bank of the Fox River, while the Village of Bristol was situated to the north. When the communities consolidated to form the United City of Yorkville (16 Apr 1957), a small community in Bristol Township, named "Bristol Station", was allowed to become the new Bristol, Illinois (unincorporated).

== Geography ==
It is located at 41.619626 N, -88.442966 W.

According to the 2021 census gazetteer files, Kendall Township has a total area of 39.21 square miles (101.55 km^{2}), of which 39.07 square miles (101.19 km^{2}) (or 99.66%) is land and 0.13 square miles (0.34 km^{2}) (or 0.34%) is water.

== Demographics ==
As of the 2020 census there were 8,532 people, 2,830 households, and 2,382 families residing in the township. The population density was 217.61 inhabitants per square mile (84.02/km^{2}). There were 3,152 housing units at an average density of 80.39 per square mile (31.04/km^{2}). The racial makeup of the township was 83.36% White, 3.45% African American, 0.48% Native American, 0.89% Asian, 0.01% Pacific Islander, 3.73% from other races, and 8.09% from two or more races. Hispanic or Latino of any race were 10.68% of the population.

There were 2,830 households, out of which 43.40% had children under the age of 18 living with them, 74.10% were married couples living together, 6.89% had a female householder with no spouse present, and 15.83% were non-families. 13.80% of all households were made up of individuals, and 9.20% had someone living alone who was 65 years of age or older. The average household size was 3.14 and the average family size was 3.48.

The township's age distribution consisted of 31.0% under the age of 18, 6.9% from 18 to 24, 25.6% from 25 to 44, 24.3% from 45 to 64, and 12.3% who were 65 years of age or older. The median age was 34.1 years. For every 100 females, there were 102.4 males. For every 100 females age 18 and over, there were 95.1 males.

The median income for a household in the township was $107,857, and the median income for a family was $115,338. Males had a median income of $62,395 versus $36,075 for females. The per capita income for the township was $39,419. About 3.7% of families and 3.6% of the population were below the poverty line, including 5.2% of those under age 18 and 1.6% of those age 65 or over.

Historical population
Census	Pop.	Note	%±
2000	4,636		—
2010	7,739		66.9%
2020	8,532		10.2%
U.S. Decennial Census

== Government ==
The township is governed by an elected Town Board of a Supervisor and four Trustees. The Township also has an elected Assessor, Clerk, and Highway Commissioner. Kendall County has its main offices, courthouse, and central County Seat within Yorkville. Kendall Township has published an informational website https://www.toi.org/township/kendall-county-kendall-township
