= Newark, Illinois =

- Village
- Flag
- Motto: "A Community of Pride and Progress"
- Location of Newark in Kendall County, Illinois

- Location of Illinois in the United States
- Coordinates: 41°32′13″N 88°34′49″W
- Country: United States
- State: Illinois
- County: Kendall
- Townships: Big Grove, Fox

Area
  - Total: 1.12 sq mi (2.91 km^{2})
  - Land: 1.12 sq mi (2.91 km^{2})
  - Water: 0 sq mi (0.00 km^{2})
- Elevation: 673 ft (205 m)

Population (2020)
  - Total: 973
  - Density: 865.5/sq mi (334.16/km^{2})
- Time zone: UTC-6 (CST)
  - Summer (DST): UTC-5 (CDT)
- ZIP code: 60541
- Area code: 815
- FIPS code: 17-52103
- GNIS feature ID: 2399488
- Wikimedia Commons: Newark, Illinois
- Website: newark-il.us

Newark is a village in Kendall County, Illinois, United States. The population was 973 at the 2020 census.

== Geography ==
Newark is located in southwestern Kendall County. Illinois Route 71 passes through the village, leading northeast 10 miles (16 km) to Yorkville, the county seat, and southwest 20 miles (32 km) to Ottawa.

According to the 2021 census gazetteer files, Newark has a total area of 1.12 square miles (2.90 km^{2}), all land.

== Demographics ==
Historical population
Census	Pop.	Note	%±
1880	442		—
1890	390		−11.8%
1900	410		5.1%
1910	406		−1.0%
1920	391		−3.7%
1930	414		5.9%
1940	425		2.7%
1950	457		7.5%
1960	489		7.0%
1970	590		20.7%
1980	798		35.3%
1990	840		5.3%
2000	887		5.6%
2010	992		11.8%
2020	973		−1.9%
U.S. Decennial Census

As of the 2020 census there were 973 people, 439 households, and 362 families residing in the village. The population density was 865.66 inhabitants per square mile (334.23/km^{2}). There were 389 housing units at an average density of 346.09 per square mile (133.63/km^{2}). The racial makeup of the village was 90.24% White, 0.00% African American, 0.62% Native American, 0.21% Asian, 0.10% Pacific Islander, 1.54% from other races, and 7.30% from two or more races. Hispanic or Latino of any race were 7.50% of the population.

There were 439 households, out of which 32.6% had children under the age of 18 living with them, 64.24% were married couples living together, 7.74% had a female householder with no husband present, and 17.54% were non-families. 15.95% of all households were made up of individuals, and 10.48% had someone living alone who was 65 years of age or older. The average household size was 3.29 and the average family size was 3.02.

The village's age distribution consisted of 22.0% under the age of 18, 8.1% from 18 to 24, 23.1% from 25 to 44, 29.5% from 45 to 64, and 17.4% who were 65 years of age or older. The median age was 43.2 years. For every 100 females, there were 85.3 males. For every 100 females age 18 and over, there were 87.1 males.

The median income for a household in the village was $101,750, and the median income for a family was $112,794. Males had a median income of $53,942 versus $24,857 for females. The per capita income for the village was $36,725. About 2.5% of families and 8.6% of the population were below the poverty line, including 12.2% of those under age 18 and 3.9% of those age 65 or over.
