= Fox Township, Kendall County, Illinois =

Fox Township
- Township
- Location in Kendall County

- Kendall County's location in Illinois
- Coordinates: 41°35′23″N 088°32′29″W
- Country: United States
- State: Illinois
- County: Kendall

Area
  - Total: 36.64 sq mi (94.9 km^{2})
  - Land: 36.17 sq mi (93.7 km^{2})
  - Water: 0.47 sq mi (1.2 km^{2}) 1.28%
- Elevation: 636 ft (194 m)

Population (2020)
  - Total: 1,681
  - Density: 46.47/sq mi (17.94/km^{2})
- FIPS code: 17-093-27416
- GNIS feature ID: 0429022

Fox Township occupies the 6 mile square on the western edge of Kendall County, Illinois. As of the 2020 census, its population was 1,681 and it contained 636 housing units. The township was named after the Fox River, which in turn was likely named after the Fox Tribe of southeastern Wisconsin.

== Geography ==
According to the 2021 census gazetteer files, Fox Township has a total area of 36.64 square miles (94.90 km^{2}), of which 36.17 square miles (93.68 km^{2}) (or 98.72%) is land and 0.47 square miles (1.22 km^{2}) (or 1.28%) is water. It includes the villages of Millbrook and Millington.

== Demographics ==
Historical population
Census	Pop.	Note	%±
2000	1,257		—
2010	1,675		33.3%
2020	1,681		0.4%
U.S. Decennial Census

As of the 2020 census there were 1,681 people, 586 households, and 479 families residing in the township. The population density was 45.89 inhabitants per square mile (17.72/km^{2}). There were 636 housing units at an average density of 17.36 per square mile (6.70/km^{2}). The racial makeup of the township was 89.41% White, 0.18% African American, 0.42% Native American, 0.24% Asian, 0.00% Pacific Islander, 2.14% from other races, and 7.61% from two or more races. Hispanic or Latino of any race were 7.32% of the population.

There were 586 households, out of which 35.80% had children under the age of 18 living with them, 79.18% were married couples living together, 1.71% had a female householder with no spouse present, and 18.26% were non-families. 15.50% of all households were made up of individuals, and 8.70% had someone living alone who was 65 years of age or older. The average household size was 3.10 and the average family size was 3.45.

The township's age distribution consisted of 21.3% under the age of 18, 14.7% from 18 to 24, 23.8% from 25 to 44, 29.6% from 45 to 64, and 10.5% who were 65 years of age or older. The median age was 34.7 years. For every 100 females, there were 121.3 males. For every 100 females age 18 and over, there were 119.7 males.

The median income for a household in the township was $100,357, and the median income for a family was $121,250. Males had a median income of $80,417 versus $31,250 for females. The per capita income for the township was $38,506. About 3.3% of families and 4.1% of the population were below the poverty line, including 2.9% of those under age 18 and 6.8% of those age 65 or over.

== Government ==
The township is governed by an elected Town Board of a Supervisor and four Trustees. The Township also has an elected Assessor, Clerk, Highway Commissioner and Supervisor.
