= Yorkville, Illinois =

City in Illinois, United States

- City
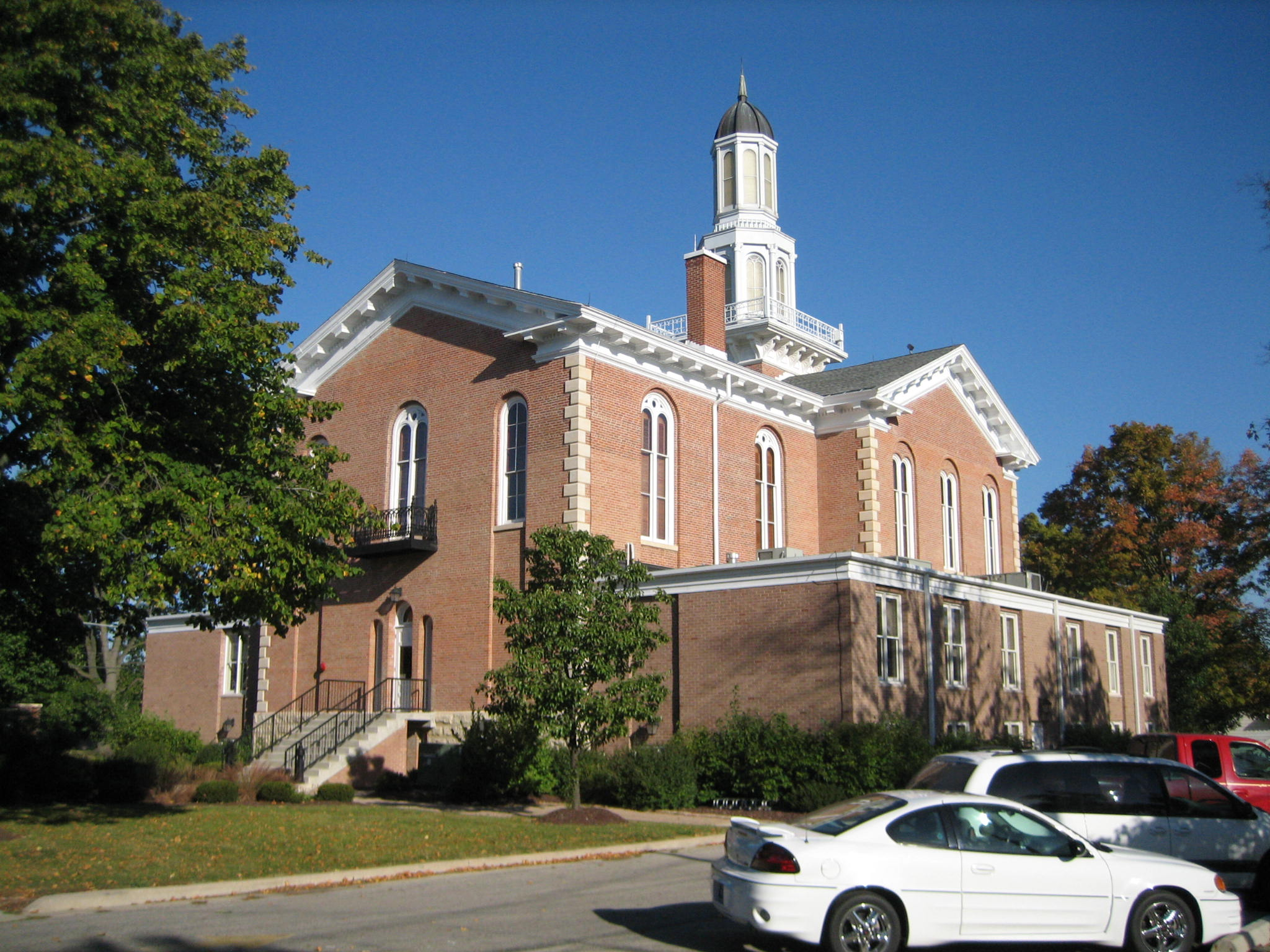
- The Kendall County Courthouse is listed on the U.S. National Register of Historic Places.
- Nicknames: The Ville, Y-Town
- Motto: "The City with a River in Its Heart”
- Interactive map of Yorkville, Illinois
- Location within Illinois Location within the United States
- Coordinates: 41°38′29″N 88°26′49″W
- Country: United States
- State: Illinois
- County: Kendall
- Townships: Bristol, Kendall, Fox
- Founded: 1833
- Incorporated: 1836

Government
  - Type: Mayor–council
  - Mayor: John Purcell

Area
  - Total: 20.09 sq mi (52.04 km^{2})
  - Land: 20.00 sq mi (51.79 km^{2})
  - Water: 0.097 sq mi (0.25 km^{2})
- Elevation: 745 ft (227 m)

Population (2020)
  - Total: 21,533
  - Density: 1,076.8/sq mi (415.77/km^{2})
- Time zone: UTC-6 (CST)
  - Summer (DST): UTC-5 (CDT)
- ZIP code: 60560
- Area codes: 630 / 331
- FIPS code: 17-84038
- Website: www.yorkville.il.us

Yorkville is a city within the Chicago metropolitan area and the county seat of Kendall County, Illinois, United States. It is a suburb of Chicago, Illinois. The population was 23,835 as of the 2022 census.

== History ==
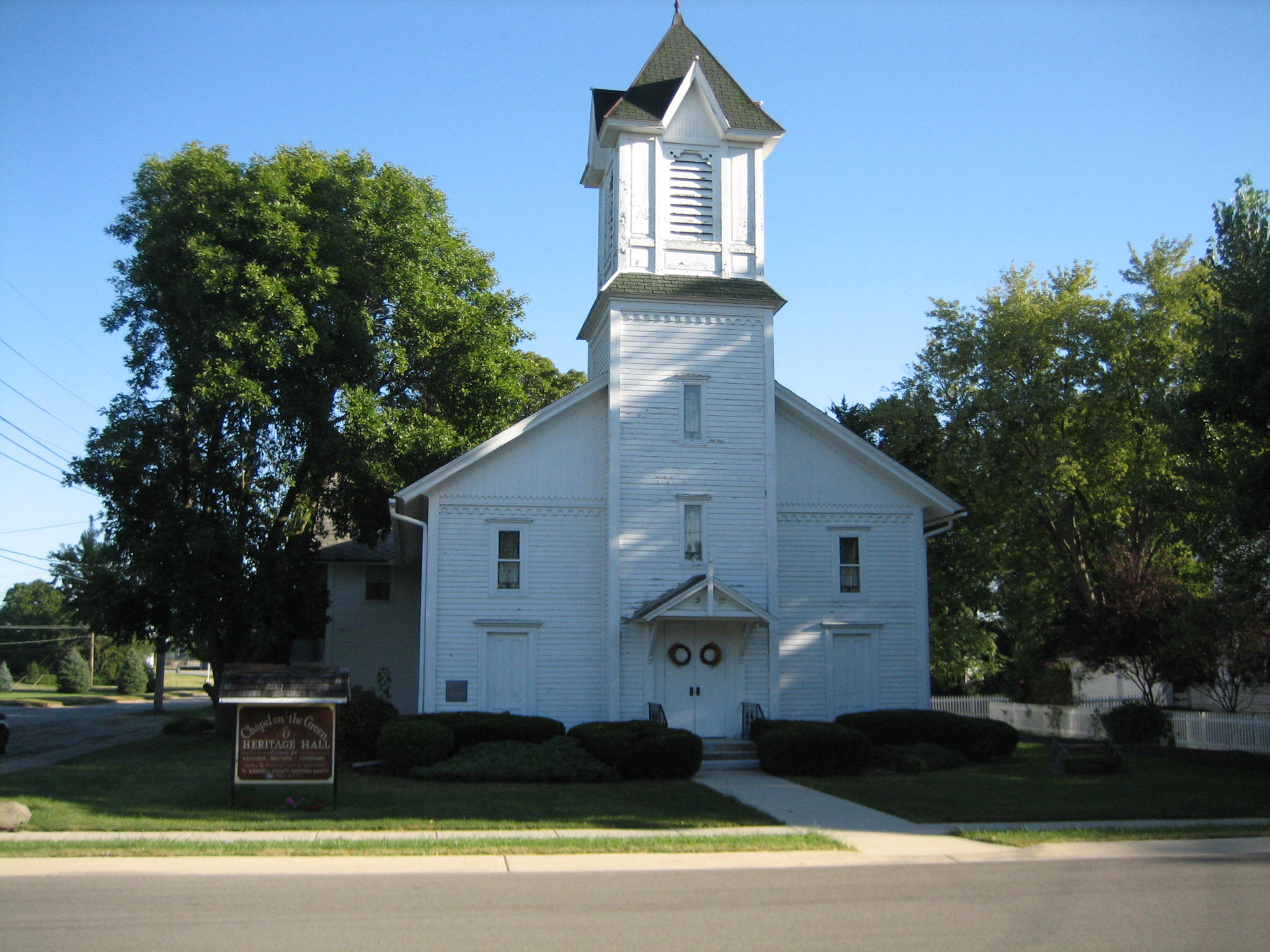
The Chapel on the Green, in Yorkville, is the oldest church in Kendall County.

In 1833, the city of Yorkville was settled by early pioneers. Originally, the city's main thoroughfare of Bridge Street was designed for horse-drawn carriages and pedestrians. As time passed, Hydraulic Street, which runs parallel to the Fox River, boasted a trolley that ran from Ottawa to Aurora. This part is now operated by the Illinois Railway.

At the time, Yorkville's central business district was on the south side of the Fox River and the public square was north of the river, a layout unique to the region. The public gathering place was near the river's edge. The Kendall County Courthouse was next to the downtown commercial district. Many of the city's remaining historic single-family homes are within walking distance of Bridge Street, the courthouse and Union Hall. Earl Adams was the first to settle what would become Yorkville when he built his cabin on Courthouse Hill on the south side of town in 1833. One year later, Lyman and Burr Bristol set up residency in neighboring Bristol, north of the river.

When the county of Kendall was formed in 1841, Yorkville was chosen as the county seat. After a 13-year period in which Oswego claimed that honor, voters chose to relocate the county government in 1859 to Yorkville, a more central location. The new courthouse was completed in 1864. Replaced in 1997 with a courthouse on the city's north side, the 1864 building is used by the Kendall County Forest Preserve and other organizations. Yorkville was no exception to the railroad boom. Development began and businesses sprang up in 1870 along the tracks and included Squire Dingee's pickle factory, the Yorkville Ice Cream Company and the Rehbehn Brothers button factory. A few of those buildings still remain.

The present city of Yorkville was originally two towns, Bristol to the north and the Yorkville south of the Fox River, with separate governments for more than 100 years. In 1957, Bristol and Yorkville merged, becoming the United City of Yorkville. Ellsworth Windett became the combined city's first mayor. As a part of the consolidation, the residents of both towns agreed to a uniform school district. It was in that same year high school classes began in the downtown area at the northeast corner of Van Emmon and Bridge Streets. In 1888, a two-story brick school building on West Center Street was constructed. After the construction of Circle Center School in 1968, the two-story building was closed and the space was rented by the Yorkville School District to neighboring Waubonsee Community College. Due to rising enrollment in the early 1970s, the school was reopened and renamed as Parkview Christian Academy.

== Geography ==
Yorkville is in northern Kendall County and is bordered to the northeast by Montgomery, to the east by Oswego, and to the west by Plano. Its boundaries are located approximately 4 miles (6.4 km) southwest of Aurora, 13 miles (21 km) southwest of Naperville, and 39 miles (63 km) west of Chicago.

According to the 2021 census gazetteer files, Yorkville has a total area of 20.10 square miles (52.06 km^{2}), of which 20.00 square miles (51.80 km^{2}) (or 99.51%) is land and 0.10 square miles (0.26 km^{2}) (or 0.49%) is water. The Fox River flows through downtown Yorkville. The city is in Bristol, Kendall, and Fox townships.

== Climate ==
Yorkville has a hot-summer humid continental climate, typical for the Midwest. Specifically, Yorkville is in the Köppen Dfa zone. In this Köppen Dfa zone precipitation is usually amble, especially in the summer months. The spring and summer months can have severe weather, including tornadoes and thunderstorms. The region has four distinct seasons. Winters tend to be cold or even frigid and have snow. Springs tend to be humid, and can have precipitation as well as storms. Summers are usually hot and tend to have the highest precipitation overall, as well as storms. It tends to cool down in the fall. Temperature records include a record low of −26 °F (−32 °C), recorded in January 1985, and a record high of 111 °F (44 °C), recorded in July 1936.

Climate data for Yorkville Monthly Normals based on 2SE Yorkville(rain)/Aurora(temps)(1991-2020)
Month	Jan	Feb	Mar	Apr	May	Jun	Jul	Aug	Sep	Oct	Nov	Dec	Year
Mean daily maximum °F (°C)	30.5 (−0.8)	34.9 (1.6)	47.0 (8.3)	58.9 (14.9)	71.1 (21.7)	80.5 (26.9)	84.0 (28.9)	82.1 (27.8)	75.8 (24.3)	62.8 (17.1)	47.8 (8.8)	35.6 (2.0)	59.2 (15.1)
Daily mean °F (°C)	23.2 (−4.9)	23.2 (−4.9)	37.9 (3.3)	49.6 (9.8)	60.6 (15.9)	70.3 (21.3)	74.4 (23.6)	72.6 (22.6)	65.5 (18.6)	53.0 (11.7)	39.7 (4.3)	28.7 (−1.8)	49.9 (10.0)
Mean daily minimum °F (°C)	16.0 (−8.9)	19.5 (−6.9)	28.9 (−1.7)	39.3 (4.1)	50.1 (10.1)	60.1 (15.6)	64.8 (18.2)	63.1 (17.3)	55.3 (12.9)	43.1 (6.2)	31.7 (−0.2)	21.8 (−5.7)	41.1 (5.1)
Average precipitation inches (mm)	2.02 (51)	1.97 (50)	2.57 (65)	3.97 (101)	4.47 (114)	5.03 (128)	4.30 (109)	3.91 (99)	3.56 (90)	3.47 (88)	2.61 (66)	2.12 (54)	40 (1,015)
Average snowfall inches (cm)	9.1 (23)	9.1 (23)	2.6 (6.6)	0.6 (1.5)	0 (0)	0 (0)	0 (0)	0.0 (0.0)	0 (0)	0 (0)	1.3 (3.3)	6.4 (16)	29.1 (73.4)
Source: NOAA

== Demographics ==
Historical population
Census	Pop.	Note	%±
1880	365		—
1890	375		2.7%
1900	413		10.1%
1910	431		4.4%
1920	441		2.3%
1930	492		11.6%
1940	562		14.2%
1950	632		12.5%
1960	1,568		148.1%
1970	2,049		30.7%
1980	3,422		67.0%
1990	3,925		14.7%
2000	6,189		57.7%
2010	16,921		173.4%
2020	21,533		27.3%
U.S. Decennial Census

=== 2020 census ===
As of the 2020 census, Yorkville had a population of 21,533 and a population density of 1,071.56 inhabitants per square mile (413.73/km^{2}). The median age was 35.6 years. 28.8% of residents were under the age of 18 and 11.3% of residents were 65 years of age or older. For every 100 females there were 96.2 males, and for every 100 females age 18 and over there were 93.9 males age 18 and over.

98.8% of residents lived in urban areas, while 1.2% lived in rural areas.

There were 7,414 households in Yorkville, of which 43.8% had children under the age of 18 living in them. Of all households, 59.5% were married-couple households, 12.4% were households with a male householder and no spouse or partner present, and 21.8% were households with a female householder and no spouse or partner present. About 19.5% of all households were made up of individuals and 8.2% had someone living alone who was 65 years of age or older.

Yorkville had 7,698 housing units, of which 3.7% were vacant. The homeowner vacancy rate was 1.6% and the rental vacancy rate was 5.7%. The average housing unit density was 383.08 per square mile (147.91/km^{2}).

Racial composition as of the 2020 census
Race	Number	Percent
White	16,523	76.7%
Black or African American	1,414	6.6%
American Indian and Alaska Native	58	0.3%
Asian	347	1.6%
Native Hawaiian and Other Pacific Islander	1	0.0%
Some other race	1,162	5.4%
Two or more races	2,028	9.4%
Hispanic or Latino (of any race)	3,208	14.9%

=== Income ===
The median income for a household in the city was $101,245, and the median income for a family was $102,368. Males had a median income of $63,750 versus $44,472 for females. The per capita income for the city was $35,449. About 4.6% of families and 6.6% of the population were below the poverty line, including 12.9% of those under age 18 and 3.8% of those age 65 or over.

== Economy ==
The William Wrigley Company has a large manufacturing facility in Yorkville. Wrigley planned to start making Skittles in Yorkville. It planned to invest about $50 million to expand its Yorkville factory by 145,000 square feet.

== Parks and recreation ==
Raging Waves waterpark, the self-proclaimed largest waterpark in Illinois, is in Yorkville. It opened in 2008 and owns about 45 acres (18 ha) of property.

The Marge Cline Whitewater Park (on the Fox River) opened in 2010. It is the only whitewater park of its kind in Illinois, similar to East Race in South Bend, Indiana. It offers opportunities for freestyle kayaking, slalom kayaking and river tubing. It is named after Marge Cline, former president of American Whitewater (1982–1988), National Board of Directors of American Canoe Association, President of Midwest Division of ACA, and member of the Chicago Whitewater association.

== Education ==
The area is served by Yorkville Community Unit School District 115. Schools include Yorkville Middle School and Yorkville High School. Additionally, a small portion of Yorkville attends Oswego Community Unit School District 308.

- Autumn Creek Elementary
- Bristol Bay Elementary
- Bristol Grade School
- Circle Center Grade School
- Grande Reserve Elementary
- Yorkville Grade School
- Yorkville Intermediate School
- Yorkville Middle School
- Yorkville Freshman Academy
- Yorkville High School

== Notable people ==
- Jon Blackman, college and NFL football player
- Dennis Hastert, former Speaker of the House and convicted felon
- Mike Radja, ice hockey player, born in Yorkville
- Andy Richter, actor and comedian
- The Giving Tree Band, American indie folk rock group

== In popular culture ==
In August 2011, the movie Man of Steel was filmed at a house built specifically for the set in Yorkville. It appeared in the movie as the Kent family farm. In the fall of 2014, that house was rebuilt for use on the set of Batman v Superman: Dawn of Justice.
