= Interstate Eight Conference =

- Conference: IHSA
- Founded: 1979
- No. of teams: 6
- Region: Northern Illinois

Locations of each school in the Interstate Eight Conference

The Interstate Eight Conference (Interstate 8 or I–8) is an athletic conference of Illinois high schools that are members of the Illinois High School Association (IHSA). The conference currently has six member schools throughout Northern Illinois that compete in 12 different sports (boys' basketball, girls' basketball, girls' volleyball, boys' golf, girls' golf, football, boys' soccer, girls' soccer, wrestling, baseball, softball, cross country, and track and field).

The Interstate Eight began in 1979 and originally had eight schools—Coal City, Dwight, Marseilles, Plano, Reed-Custer, Seneca, Wilmington, and Yorkville. Sandwich soon entered the I-8 when Marseilles dropped out. In 1991, Yorkville was replaced by Lisle. In 2006 Herscher, Manteno, Peotone, and Westmont joined the conference. Despite the conference growing from eight to 12 teams, the conference name remained Interstate 8. Dwight left the conference prior to the 2014–15 season while Streator joined the conference. In 2019–20, Reed-Custer, Manteno, Peotone, Herscher, Wilmington, Seneca, Streator, Coal City, Westmont and Lisle left the conference leaving only Plano and Sandwich in the conference. That year, the conference added six schools from the soon to be defunct Northern Illinois Big 12 Conference. These included Kaneland, LaSalle-Peru, Morris, Ottawa, Rochelle, and Sycamore. These moves left Plano as the only remaining founding member of the conference.

In 2022, Sandwich High School and Plano High School announcing to leave the conference to join Kishwaukee River Conference starting in 2023–24 season. Plano was the final remaining original I8C member, completing nearly 45 seasons. This left the Interstate Eight with, ironically, only six schools. All of which are the former NI-Big 12 schools.

Most of the member schools are/were in rural/smaller towns. Former members Westmont and Lisle are suburbs of Chicago but enrollments are small in size. Westmont's population is divided between the varying schools in the area, including high schools in Darien, Woodridge, Hinsdale, Bolingbrook, Naperville, Lisle, Lombard, and Glen Ellyn. Lisle's enrollment is small, due to Lisle's relatively small size as a city, as well as being located east of Naperville, which has at least four high schools in the immediate vicinity, as well as the Glenbard schools and Wheaton-Warrenville South all being within a close proximity to the high school.

The Conference is divided into Large and Small divisions during football season and teams only play members of their division for the conference schedule. Baseball and softball are also divided into North and South divisions. In all other sports, the conference is undivided.

== Members ==
There are six current members of the conference

=== Current members ===
High Schools	Town	County	Team name	Colors	Joined	IHSA Classification
Kaneland High School	Maple Park	Kane	Knights		2019	2A/3A
LaSalle-Peru High School	LaSalle	LaSalle	Cavaliers		2019	2A/3A
Morris Community High School	Morris	Grundy	Warriors		2019	2A/3A
Ottawa Township High School	Ottawa	LaSalle	Pirates		2019	2A/3A
Rochelle Township High School	Rochelle	Ogle	Hubs		2019	2A/3A
Sycamore High School	Sycamore	DeKalb	Spartans		2019	2A/3A

=== Former Members ===
High Schools	Town	County	Team name	Colors	Joined	Left	Current Conference
Coal City High School	Coal City	Grundy	Coalers		1979	2019	Illinois Central Eight
Dwight High School	Dwight	Livingston	Trojans		1979	2014	Tri-County
Herscher High School	Herscher	Kankakee	Tigers		2006	2019	Illinois Central Eight
Lisle High School	Lisle	DuPage	Lions		1991	2019	Illinois Central Eight
Manteno High School	Manteno	Kankakee	Panthers		2002	2019	Illinois Central Eight
Marseilles High School	Marseilles	LaSalle	Panthers		1979	1985	None (Closed in 1990)
Peotone High School	Peotone	Will	Blue Devils		2002	2019	Illinois Central Eight
Plano High School	Plano	Kendall	Reapers		1979	2023	Kishwaukee River
Reed-Custer High School	Braidwood	Will	Comets		1979	2019	Illinois Central Eight
Sandwich High School	Sandwich	DeKalb	Indians		1985	2023	Kishwaukee River
Seneca High School	Seneca	LaSalle	Fighting Irish		1979	2018	Tri-County
Streator Township High School	Streator	LaSalle	Bulldogs		2014	2019	Illinois Central Eight
Westmont High School	Westmont	DuPage	Sentinels		2006	2019	Chicago Prep
Wilmington High School	Wilmington	Will	Wildcats		1979	2019	Illinois Central Eight
Yorkville High School	Yorkville	Kendall	Foxes		1979	1991	Southwest Prairie

=== Membership Timeline ===
Full members Football-only members Non-football members

== State titles ==
=== Football ===
Football is based on an 8 class system since 2001.

- Plano (2006 3A, 2007 3A)
- Coal City (1993 2A)
- Seneca (1990 2A)
- Wilmington (2014 3A)

=== Boys baseball ===
- Lisle (2013 2A)
- Wilmington (2003, 2005)
- Reed-Custer (1985) (2016)
- Herscher (1999) (2015)

=== Wrestling ===
- Wilmington (2007, 2008, 2009)
- Sandwich (1991, 1997, 1999, 2001)
- Reed-Custer (2010,2012)

=== Boys basketball ===
- Seneca (2005–06 A)

=== Boys golf ===
- Dwight (1980)

=== Boys soccer ===
- Lisle (2010 1A)

=== Girls soccer ===
- Manteno (2009 1A)
- Manteno (2014 1A)

=== Competitive cheerleading ===
- Dwight (2013)
- Wilmington(2016)

=== Competitive Dance Team ===
- Peotone (2012 1A)

=== Boys cross country ===
Cross Country is based on a 3 class system since 2007.

- Seneca (1989 A)
- Kaneland (2019 AA)

=== Girls cross country ===
Cross Country is based on a 3 class system since 2007.

- Herscher (1991 A, 1992 A, 1996 A)

=== Girls track and field ===
- Herscher (1996)

=== Girls softball ===
- Coal City (2010)

=== Girls volleyball ===
- Lisle (1985)

=== Scholastic Bowl ===
Lisle (2011, 2012, 2013, 2014, 2015, 2016 wins)
