= Northern Illinois Big 12 Conference =

Big Twelve conference in Northern Illinois

- Conference: IHSA
- Founded: 2010
- Folded: 2018
- No. of teams: 10
- Region: Northern Illinois

The Northern Illinois Big 12 Conference was a high-school athletic conference with ten high schools in northern Illinois. The conference began competing during the 2010–2011 academic year and dissolved following the 2018–2019 academic year. In many respects, including membership and organization, the NI-Big 12 was much like a reboot of the old North Central Illinois Conference (NCIC). Six of the schools were former members of the North Central Illinois Conference (1929-2011), and the conference was divided into two divisions, much as the NCIC was for decades. The former NCIC schools were Geneseo, LaSalle-Peru, Sterling, Ottawa, and Rochelle. Also, there were five schools that were members of the Western Sun Conference (2007-2010). The former Western Sun Schools are DeKalb, Kaneland, Sycamore, Yorkville, and Rochelle, which left the NCIC in 2007 to join the WSC, and was thus a member of both extinct conferences.

The creation of the new conference appeared to have settled an unstable situation that existed in the NCIC since the departure of the Rochelle Hubs after winning nine consecutive NCIC (Southwest Div.) football championships. When Rochelle became a founding member of the Western Sun, the NCIC began shifting members trying to keep together a conference that was built of schools with inordinately large population variances. Whereas the NCIC schools had not all played in the same division in football for several decades, all the schools of the NIB-12 do play in the same division in all sports, regardless of the number of classes.

The NIB-12 essentially consisted of the largest of the former NCIC's schools, with the smallest schools being replaced by Rochelle's new rivals from the Western Sun. The average enrollment of the NIB-12 schools in the 2014–15 school year was 1210, with the largest school being Yorkville (1650) and the smallest being Geneseo (832).

In 2013, both Dixon and Streator chose to leave the NIB-12. Streator was burdened by the greatest traveling distances in the conference, and Dixon simply proved too weak to be able to compete. With the two Western Division schools leaving, Rochelle was moved from the Eastern division to the Western, leaving both divisions with five teams.

All NIB-12 high schools are members of the Illinois High School Association (IHSA).

== Members ==
=== East division ===
School	Town	Team Name	Colors	IHSA Classes (2/3/4)	Departed for
DeKalb High School	DeKalb	Barbs		AA/2A-3A/4A	DuPage Valley
Kaneland High School	Maple Park	Knights		AA/2A/3A	Interstate 8
Morris Community High School	Morris	Redskins		AA/2A/3A	Interstate 8
Sycamore High School	Sycamore	Spartans		AA/2A/3A	Interstate 8
Yorkville High School	Yorkville	Foxes		AA/2A-3A/4A	Southwest Prairie

=== West division ===
School	Town	Team Name	Colors	IHSA Classes (2/3/4)	Departed for
Rochelle Township High School	Rochelle	Hubs		AA/2A/3A	Interstate 8
Geneseo High School	Geneseo	Maple Leafs		AA/2A/3A	Western Big 6
LaSalle-Peru High School	LaSalle	Cavaliers		AA/2A/3A	Interstate 8
Ottawa Township High School	Ottawa	Pirates		AA/2A/3A-4A	Interstate 8
Sterling High School	Sterling	Golden Warriors		AA/2A/3A	Western Big 6
