= Mid-America Competing Band Directors Association =

- Abbreviation: MACBDA
- Formation: 1972; 54 years ago
- Dissolved: 2021 (estimated)
- Type: Performing arts organization
- Purpose: Summer high school marching band competition circuit.
- Region served: Midwestern United States

The Mid-America Competing Band Directors Association (MACBDA) was a governing body and summer high school marching band competition circuit based in the Upper Midwest.

The circuit's competitive season traditionally began in June, and previously included field, parade, and concert band competitions hosted throughout the Midwestern United States. Beginning in 2008, almost all competitive events were hosted in Wisconsin and Minnesota, and were limited to field band competitions with occasional parade band presentations.

The most recent circuit championship was at Perkins Stadium, in Whitewater, Wisconsin on July 14, 2019. The association had twenty-five member bands in 2008, but only five remained active as of July 2018. Competitions were not held in 2020–21 due to the Covid pandemic. As of the 2022 season, the association has not scheduled any competitions.

== About ==
MACBDA was founded in 1972 by a group of high school band directors who wished to develop a summer competition circuit, similar to competitive junior drum corps. A summer season was preferable, as average autumn temperatures in the Midwest are often considered too cold for marching bands to perform successfully.

The circuit hosted member bands from Wisconsin, Illinois, Indiana, Iowa, Michigan, and Minnesota. Prior to 1991, bands competed in three activities; concert band, parade, and field band. As of July 2018, only five field bands remained active members of the circuit.

=== Governance ===
The circuit was governed by a two executive officers, a President and Vice President. It is unclear how the circuit was organized, whether it be as a public benefit nonprofit corporation or as an unincorporated entity, or in which state the circuit was registered. MACBDA was not an IRS 501(c) tax exempt organization.

=== Archive and past scores ===
No official archive of MACBDA's proceedings exists and very few caption recaps or scores have been preserved from past competitions. The official website, now offline, listed scores for the current year’s competitions.

Some score summaries can be recovered via the Internet Archive, or via fansites such as Marching.com.

== Membership ==
Competing bands were often attached to high school band programs, and supported by band booster clubs. Other bands were supported by nonprofit organizations and accepted performers from multiple schools or communities. All band members were required to be enrolled in high school, and were eligible to compete the summer following graduation. (Note: Rules and regulations published by MACBDA pertained only to field band competitions.) However, member bands who pre-dated the founding of the circuit would accept members up to age 21.

=== Members as of 2021 ===
Unit	Sponsor	Location
Lighthouse Brigade of Racine	Racine Unified School District (formerly)	Racine, Wisconsin
Sound of Sun Prairie	Sun Prairie High School / Sun Prairie Band Boosers	Sun Prairie, Wisconsin
Green Beret Marching Band		Janesville, Wisconsin
Rock River Concord	Fort Atkinson High School	Fort Atkinson, Wisconsin
Columbus Saints Drum and Bugle Corps	Saints Performing Arts, Inc.	Columbus, Ohio

=== Former members ===
Unit	Sponsor	Location
Band of the Black Watch	Kenosha Unified School District	Kenosha, Wisconsin
Bishop Grandin Marching Ghosts	Bishop Grandin High School	Calgary, Alberta
Blackhawk Brigade	Prairie du Chien High School	Prairie du Chien, Wisconsin
Calgary Stampede Showband	Calgary Marching Showband Association	Calgary, Alberta
Crimson Express	Murphysboro High School	Murphysboro, Illinois
CYO Emerald Knights Band	Catholic Youth Organization (Kenosha)	Kenosha, Wisconsin
Dakota Marching Indians	Dakota Junior Senior High School	Dakota, Illinois
Dundee Scots		West Dundee, Illinois
Edmonton Ambassadors		Edmonton, Alberta
Edmonton Crusaders		Edmonton, Alberta
Heraldry Guard	Crystal Lake Central High School; Crystal Lake South High School	Crystal Lake, Illinois
Hibbing Blue Jackets	Hibbing High School	Hibbing, Minnesota
Lena-Winslow Band	Lena-Winslow High School	Lena, Illinois
Lutheran Vanguard	Wisconsin Evangelical Lutheran Synod	Appleton, Wisconsin
Newman Pride	Newman Central Catholic High School	Newman, Illinois
Oregon Shadow Armada	Oregon High School	Oregon, Wisconsin
Pride of the Lions		Regina, Saskatchewan
R Troop	Romeoville High School	Romeoville, Illinois
Renegade Regiment	Sandwich Community High School	Sandwich, Illinois
Rocori Spartans	Rocori High School	Cold Spring, Minnesota
Saskatoon Lions		Saskatoon, Saskatchewan
Trojan Guard	Chesterton High School	Chesterton, Indiana
The Lake Band	Lake Band Parents Inc.	Milwaukee, Wisconsin
The Warren Junior Military Band		Warren, Ohio
Whitnall Falcons	Whitnall High School	Greenfield, Wisconsin

== Competitive season ==
=== Classification ===
Bands were split between A and Open classes, based on the number of performing members. A third class, AA, was previously available according to results archived on Marching.com.

AAA Class was removed and replaced with Open Class between 2006 and 2007.

=== Field band adjudication ===
MACBDA utilized a single-tier adjudication handbook for field band competitions. There were no adjustments or recommendations for scoring large and small bands. The annual Youth in Music Band Championships utilized the MACBDA scoring format.

==== Captions and rubric ====
Scoring was based on two broad categories: Performance, and Effect. The categories were further divided into four reference criteria or captions, with each given a maximum value of 200 points, or up to 20 points when factored. Percussion and Auxiliary, or color guard, captions were also available, each given a maximum value of 100 points, or ten points when factored. The final score was tabulated by adding all captions, less any penalties.

Captions and their maximum values were:
Category	Performance	+	Effect	=	Points
Music	Music Performance (200) / 10	+	Music Effect (200) / 10	=	50.00
Music	Percussion (100) / 10	+	Music Effect (200) / 10	=	50.00
Visual	Visual Performance (200) / 10	+	Visual Effect (200) / 10	=	50.00
Visual	Auxiliary (100) / 10	+	Visual Effect (200) / 10	=	50.00
			Subtotal	=	100.00
			Timing & Penalties	=	0.00
			Total	=	100.00

One adjudicator was assigned to each caption, and one each to percussion and auxiliary. An additional adjudicator was responsible for timing and penalties. In addition to a tabulator, each competition required eight personnel.

MACBDA did not have captions for drum majors, twirling teams and majorettes, or dance teams. Performance excellence by a drum major was recognized by the Effect or Performance adjudicators where appropriate. Twirlers and dance teams would fall under the responsibility of the Auxiliary adjudicator. Almost all participating bands performed with a color guard team.

==== Placements and awards ====
Placements and total scores were announced for each class following the last band's performance. Caption awards were also announced for "High Music Execution", "High Visual Execution", "High Music General Effect", "High Visual General Effect", "High Percussion" and "High Auxiliary'. The awards recognized the highest placing band in each caption, regardless of class.

A Drum Major excellence award was also announced, but did not affect the overall score for any of the competing bands.

=== Parade band adjudication ===
Parade band adjudication fell under three captions: Marching, Effect, and Music. The two captions with the largest impact on a band's final score are Effect and Music, valued at up to 40 points each. Effect emphasizes overall ensemble performance, while music execution favors quality of tone and musical intonation.

Parade competitions could have up to nine judges, three per caption. Scores are averaged within captions, and then summed.

Captions and their maximum values are:
Caption	Points
General Effect & Showmanship (40)	40.0
Music Execution (40)	40.0
Marching & Maneuvering (20)	20.0
Subtotal	100.0
Penalties	0.0
Total	100.0

== Past champions ==
It is unclear when MACBDA championships were first hosted or which event was sanctioned as a championship prior to 1979. The following is an incomplete and unverified list of championship results:

Year	A class (Note: Unverified location or championship results.)	—	Open Class (Note: Also known as AA Class.)	Ref(s)
1972–1978	No data		No data	
1979 (Note: Source names the competition as the National Cherry Festival, and not MACBDA Championships.)	No data		Heraldry Guard	
1980	No data		Dundee Scots	
1981	No data		Dundee Scots	
1982	No data		Heraldry Guard	
1983	No data		Band of the Black Watch	
1984	No data		The Lake Band	
1985	R Troop		Band of the Black Watch	
1986	R Troop		Band of the Black Watch	
1987	No data		Band of the Black Watch	
1988	No data		Band of the Black Watch	
Year	A class	AA class	AAA Class (Note: Also known as Open Class)	Ref(s)
1989	Newman Pride	Oregon High School	Band of the Black Watch	
1990 (Note: Source names the competition as Racine Fourth Fest Band Championships, not MACBDA Championships.)	Dakota Marching Indians	Oregon High School	Sound of Sun Prairie	
1991	No data	No data	No data	
1992	Dakota Marching Indians	No data	Pride of the Lions	
1993 (Note: Source names the competition as National Championships, and not MACBDA Championships.)	No data	No data	Warren Junior Military Band	
1994 (Note: Source names the competition as Lighthouse Brigade Band Championships and not MACBDA Championships.)	Green Beret	Rocori Spartans	Oregon High School	
1995	No data			
1996	Dakota Marching Indians	Edmonton Crusaders	Pride of the Lions	
1997	Dakota Marching Indians	Rocori Spartans	Pride of the Lions	
1998	Dakota Marching Indians	Rocori Spartans	Sound of Sun Prairie	
1999	Edmonton Crusaders	Rocori Spartans	Sound of Sun Prairie	
2000	Green Beret	No data	Sound of Sun Prairie	
2001	Dakota Marching Indians	Crimson Express	Sound of Sun Prairie	
2002	Dakota Marching Indians	Crimson Express	Sound of Sun Prairie	
2003	Renegade Regiment	No data	Pride of the Lions	
2004	Renegade Regiment	No data	Sound of Sun Prairie	
2005	Dakota Marching Indians	Renegade Regiment	Sound of Sun Prairie	
2006	Warren Junior Military Band	Renegade Regiment	Lighthouse Brigade	
2007	Green Beret	Renegade Regiment	Sound of Sun Prairie	
Year	A	—	Open Class	Ref(s)
2008	Saskatoon Lions		Oregon High School	
2009	CYO Emerald Knights		Oregon High School	
2010	Green Beret		Oregon Shadow Armada	
2011	No data		Calgary Stampede	
2012	Green Beret		Oregon Shadow Armada	
2013	Green Beret		Oregon Shadow Armada	
2014	No data		Sound of Sun Prairie	
2015	No data		Oregon Shadow Armada	
2016	No data		Sound of Sun Prairie	
2017	No data		Lighthouse Brigade	
2018	Rock River Concord		Sound of Sun Prairie	
2019	Green Beret		Sound of Sun Prairie	

== See also ==
- Bands of America
- Northwest Association for Performing Arts
- Western Band Association
- Youth in Music
