= Sandwich Township, DeKalb County, Illinois =

Township in DeKalb County, Illinois, US

Sandwich Township
- Township
- Location in DeKalb County

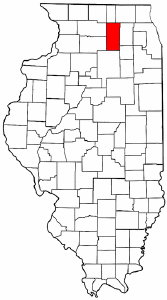
- DeKalb County's location in Illinois
- Coordinates: 41°40′20″N 88°37′48″W
- Country: United States
- State: Illinois
- County: DeKalb
- Established: July 14, 1896

Area
  - Total: 15.33 sq mi (39.7 km^{2})
  - Land: 15.26 sq mi (39.5 km^{2})
  - Water: 0.06 sq mi (0.16 km^{2}) 0.41%
- Elevation: 686 ft (209 m)

Population (2020)
  - Total: 7,510
  - Density: 492/sq mi (190/km^{2})
- Time zone: UTC-6 (CST)
  - Summer (DST): UTC-5 (CDT)
- ZIP codes: 60511, 60548, 60552
- FIPS code: 17-037-67561

Sandwich Township is one of nineteen townships in DeKalb County, Illinois, United States. As of the 2020 census, its population was 7,510 and it contained 3,017 housing units. Sandwich Township was formed from a portion of Somonauk Township on July 14, 1896.

== Geography ==
According to the 2021 census gazetteer files, Sandwich Township has a total area of 15.33 square miles (39.70 km^{2}), of which 15.26 square miles (39.52 km^{2}) (or 99.59%) is land and 0.06 square miles (0.16 km^{2}) (or 0.41%) is water.

=== Cities, towns, villages ===
- Sandwich (west three-quarters)

=== Cemeteries ===
- Pratt's Oaklawn
- Saint Paul's Catholic
- Oak Ridge

=== Airports and landing strips ===
- Gord Airport
- Hospital Heliport
- Sandwich Airport
- Woodlake Landing Airport

== Demographics ==
As of the 2020 census there were 7,510 people, 2,664 households, and 1,770 families residing in the township. The population density was 489.98 inhabitants per square mile (189.18/km^{2}). There were 3,017 housing units at an average density of 196.84 per square mile (76.00/km^{2}). The racial makeup of the township was 84.51% White, 1.01% African American, 0.43% Native American, 0.71% Asian, 0.01% Pacific Islander, 6.19% from other races, and 7.14% from two or more races. Hispanic or Latino of any race were 14.13% of the population.

There were 2,664 households, out of which 32.20% had children under the age of 18 living with them, 49.32% were married couples living together, 10.92% had a female householder with no spouse present, and 33.56% were non-families. 24.00% of all households were made up of individuals, and 10.80% had someone living alone who was 65 years of age or older. The average household size was 2.82 and the average family size was 3.31.

The township's age distribution consisted of 25.6% under the age of 18, 10.7% from 18 to 24, 25.5% from 25 to 44, 20.6% from 45 to 64, and 17.5% who were 65 years of age or older. The median age was 37.4 years. For every 100 females, there were 103.8 males. For every 100 females age 18 and over, there were 90.0 males.

The median income for a household in the township was $71,500, and the median income for a family was $77,339. Males had a median income of $43,452 versus $26,260 for females. The per capita income for the township was $30,055. About 5.0% of families and 7.3% of the population were below the poverty line, including 8.7% of those under age 18 and 2.0% of those age 65 or over.

Historical population
Census	Pop.	Note	%±
1930	2,913		—
1940	2,898		−0.5%
1950	3,404		17.5%
1960	4,287		25.9%
1970	5,250		22.5%
1980	5,739		9.3%
1990	5,990		4.4%
2000	6,933		15.7%
2010	7,709		11.2%
2020	7,510		−2.6%
US Decennial Census

== School districts ==
- Sandwich Community Unit School District 430
- Somonauk Community Unit School District 432

== Political districts ==
- Illinois's 14th congressional district
- State House District 70
- State Senate District 35
