= Dundee Scots =

High school marching band

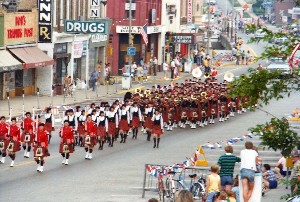
The Dundee Scots on parade

The Dundee Scots were a high school marching band from the Dundee area in Northern Illinois, United States. Their beginning dates to the Fall of 1966, when they adopted the Scottish theme to complement the town's namesake, Dundee, Scotland. They entered their first Summer of band competition in 1967, winning third place in class AAA at Winnipeg, Manitoba, Canada. In the Summer of 1968 the Scots won another third place at the V.F.W. National Contest in Detroit, Michigan.

== Background ==
The band rose to national fame under the directorship of Doyle Heffron. Noteworthy performances included playing for Richard Nixon's inaugural in 1972. One of the first successes was beating out 49 other states to win the VFW parade in St. Louis, Missouri in 1970. The Scots furthered that success by winning the Governor's Trophy at the National Cherry Festival in 1969, 1970, and 1971, prompting representatives of the Cherry Festival to travel to Dundee's Spain Field and award the trophy as a permanent prize to the Dundee Scots. Prior to that, the trophy had always been a traveling trophy. Doyle Heffron later became the director of the Cherry Festival in Traverse City, Michigan.

In 1972 they were one of the founding members of the MACBDA, a premier summer marching band circuit for high school bands in the Midwest. They continued competing in that organization, winning the overall championship several times, until they disbanded in 1994.

The Dundee Scots released an album in 1971 entitled The Sound of the Dundee Scots. This album included music from field competitions dating from 1968 through 1971.

- Scotland the Brave
- British Grenadier & Rule Britannia
- Field Competition 1971: Narrator - Robert Lemke
- Trumpet Voluntary
- Brigadoon Medley
- Commonwealth Medley
- What Kind of Fool am I
- Wee MacGregor
- Londonderry Aire
- Auld Lang Syne
- Brigadoon Fanfare
- Camelot Medley
- When Johnny Comes Marching Home
- Macarena
- Requiem for the Masses
- Swing Low
- Somewhere
- April in Paris
- We've Only Just Begun

Unlike other High School bands, the Scots were a military style band, with the precision and discipline more like a drum and bugle corps. Uniforms included Royal Stewart tartan kilts, white tunics, sporrans, and headwear. Instrumentalists wore Glengarry caps, the color guard wore Balmoral tams, and the Drum Majors wore shakos.
