= Rufus B. von KleinSmid =

American academic (1875–1964)

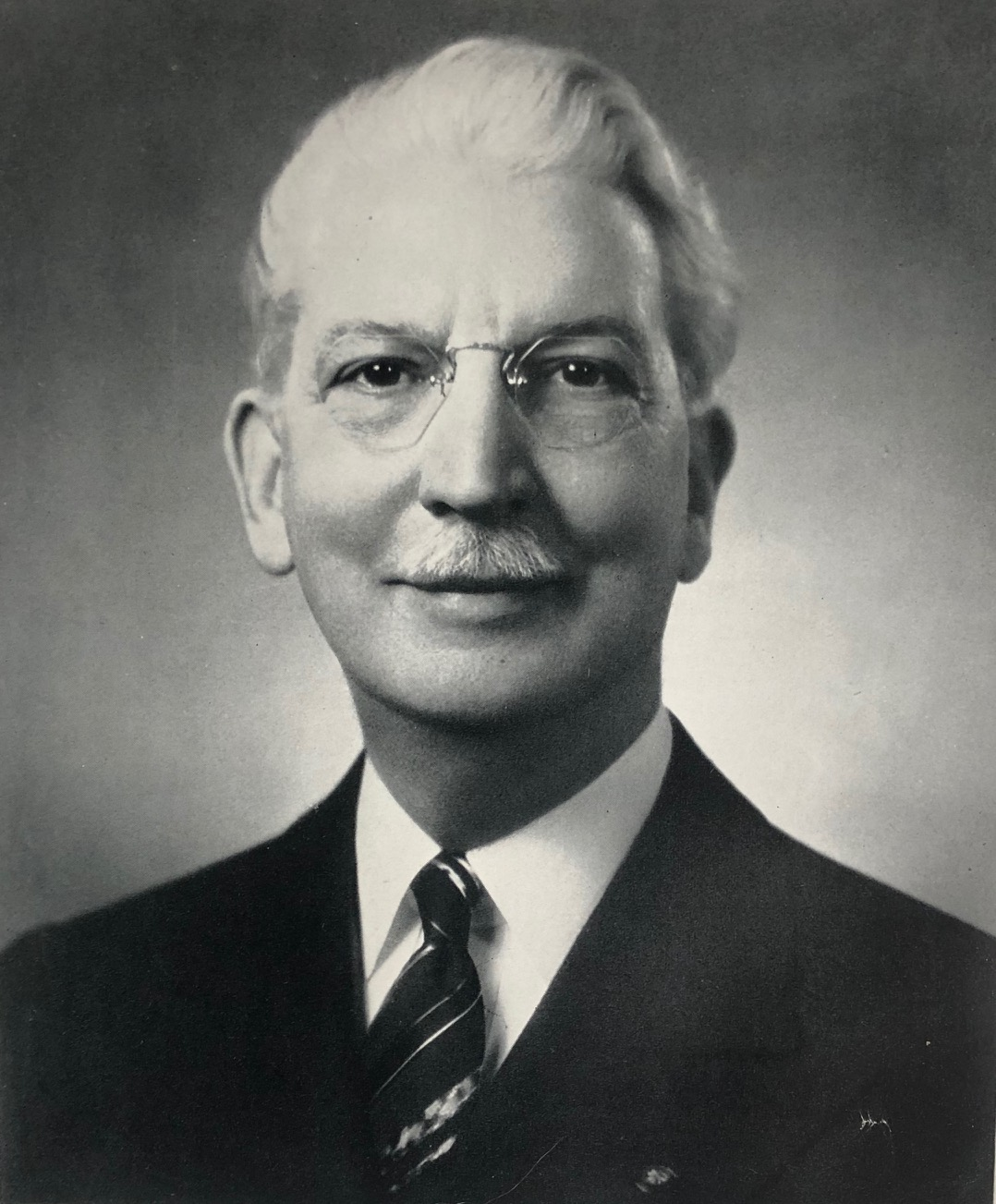
- KleinSmid from 1946 USC yearbook

5th President of the University of Southern California
- In office 1921–1947
- Preceded by: George F. Bovard
- Succeeded by: Fred D. Fagg, Jr.

7th President of the University of Arizona
- In office 1914–1921
- Preceded by: Arthur H. Wilde
- Succeeded by: Cloyd H. Marvin

Personal details
- Born: 1875 Sandwich, Illinois
- Died: July 9, 1964 (aged 89)
- Spouse: Elisabeth Patterson Sawyers (m. 1911; died 1947)
- Children: 1
- Education: Northwestern University, 1905

Rufus Bernhard von KleinSmid (1875 – July 9, 1964), also spelled Kleinsmidt, was an American academic administrator: he was the seventh president of the University of Arizona (1914–1921) and the fifth president of the University of Southern California (1921–1947). At both universities he was notable in accomplishing capital and academic programs.

== Life and career ==
Von KleinSmid was born and grew up in Sandwich, Illinois. His family was of Dutch descent. He earned a BA and MA at Northwestern University, graduating in 1905.

After teaching for a short time at Northwestern, he moved to DePauw University, where he became a professor of education and psychology. He was noted for his work in criminal psychology and founded the American Association of Criminal Psychology.

In 1911 he married Elisabeth Patterson Sawyers, a fellow faculty member at DePauw. They had one daughter together.

=== Administrator ===
Von Kleinsmid shifted into academic administration as seventh President of University of Arizona (1914-1921). He was notable for his building program there.

He became the fifth president of University of Southern California in 1921. Started as a Methodist-affiliated college, the university had become secular. A high priority of his administration was to expand professional training programs. In 1924 he established the School of International Relations, beginning leadership in that field for the university.

Von KleinSmid also presided over a building program that added nine major structures to the university campus. By the end of his first decade in office, USC had attained full national accreditation and established a graduate school to unify graduate work across the university. But the onset and persistence of the Great Depression forced the university to cut back somewhat.

USC worked to attract foreign exchange students from around the world. In the early 1930s, it ranked third among American universities for its number of foreign students.

During the 1930s, Prince Iyesato Tokugawa worked with USC to encourage student foreign exchange programs between the U.S. and Japan. During the prince's 1934 visit to the United States, von KleinSmid bestowed an honorary Doctor of Laws degree upon him for his philanthropic and educational achievements. In 1935 President Franklin Delano Roosevelt visited the university and also received an honorary Doctor of Laws degree.

The Japanese attack on Pearl Harbor in December 1941 brought the United States into World War II. During the war, army barracks were constructed on the USC campus and some buildings were taken over for military use. The curriculum reflected a wartime emphasis on international relations, history, geography, languages, science and the like. Some 2,000 military trainees added to crowded conditions on campus.

After the war, the lack of space at USC grew even worse, as the G.I. Bill enabled numerous veterans to study at the university. Enrollment soared from 15,500 in 1945 to more than 24,000 in 1947.

In 1947 KleinSmid, then aged 70, elected to step down and became USC's chancellor. He held this position for the remaining seventeen years of his life.

He was recognized as "one of three of the nation's most distinguished citizens" through the National Institute of Social Sciences Gold Medal Award. On an international level, KleinSmid received awards from 20 national governments for his achievements.

KleinSmid died on July 9, 1964.

== Legacy ==
A passionate supporter of eugenics, which he described as "the science of good birth", and related sterilization programs, KleinSmid co-founded the Human Betterment Foundation. In 1913, he argued that "the acceptance is even now upon us, and the application of the principles of Eugenics to organized society is one of the most important duties of the social scientist of the present generation."

From 1942 until the end of his life, von KleinSmid became excessively racist and refused to allow Americans of Japanese descent to complete their studies at USC, receive diplomas, or to obtain official transcripts that would allow those students to transfer to other American educational institutions to complete their education. His actions were in sharp contrast to the actions taken by the presidents Robert Gordon Sproul of the University of California and Lee Paul Sieg of the University of Washington.

On June 10, 2020, USC decided to remove von KleinSmid's name from one of its most prominent buildings, the von KleinSmid Center for International and Public Affairs. The building was later renamed in honor of war hero and USC alumnus Joe Medicine Crow.

== See also ==
- University of Southern California School of International Relations
- Von KleinSmid Mansion

== Notes ==
Academic offices
Preceded by Arthur H. Wilde	7th President of the University of Arizona; 1914--1921	Succeeded by Cloyd Heck Marvin
Preceded by George F. Bovard	5th President of the University of Southern California; 1921-1947	Succeeded by Fred D. Fagg, Jr.
