= Sandwich Community High School =

Location
- 515 Lions Road; Sandwich, Illinois 60548; United States
- Coordinates: 41°38′23″N 88°36′54″W

Information
- School type: Public secondary
- Opened: 1855
- School district: Sandwich Community Unit School District 430
- Superintendent: Tom Sodaro
- CEEB code: 143830
- NCES School ID: 173537003693
- Principal: Shane Darnell
- Teaching staff: 44.51 (FTE)
- Grades: 9–12
- Gender: Coed
- Enrollment: 549 (2023–2024)
- Average class size: 18.2
- Student to teacher ratio: 12.33
- Campus: Suburban
- Colours: black orange
- Athletics conference: Kishwaukee River Conference
- Nickname: Indians/Lady Indians
- Yearbook: Reflector
- Communities served: Sandwich, Somonauk, Lake Holiday, Sheridan, Plano, Millington, Newark
- Website: shs.sandwich430.org

Sandwich Community High School is a public four-year secondary education school located in Sandwich, Illinois, about 60 miles from Chicago. The high school is part of Sandwich Community Unit School District 430. The school is a member of the Kishwaukee River Conference, and the school participates in Baseball, Softball, Volleyball, Cross Country, Soccer, Golf, Boys/Girls Basketball, Wrestling, Boys/Girls Track & Field, Fishing, Swimming and Diving, Doing It, Scholastic Bowl, and all music-related competitions. The high school is currently a Class 3A school in Football, while competing as Class 2A school in other events due to its enrollment size.

== History ==
The school was initially held at Herman E. Dummer School, which at that time served as the high school until the class sizes grew too big for the school. The new high school was opened in 1967, and the facility on Lions Road is still used to this day for the high school. With the help of a few referendums, the school has added on and grown a few times since the initial construction, with the last phase of addition having been in the summer of 2007 with the addition of two portable classrooms onto the site to allow for more classes to be held. The school district currently has purchased land near the intersection of E. Lions Road and N. Millington Road, with the intent to build a new high school, but when that will be is still undetermined.

== Athletics ==
As of the 2025-2026 school year, Sandwich competes as part of the Kishwaukee River Conference, which it officially joined in 2023. Previously it was a member of the Interstate Eight Conference having been a member since 1979, and before that, Sandwich was part of the Little Ten Conference, of which it was one of the schools included during the conference's creation. Sandwich had received regular-season basketball championships in the conference in 1920, 1927, and 1937. Sandwich won four state titles for wrestling in 1991, 1997, 1999, and 2001. The Cross Country and Track & Field programs at the school are normally perennial qualifiers for postseason competition, but as of this time, there is no state title.

=== The War on 34 (Football) ===
Sandwich and neighboring Plano have had a contentious history, not only due to them sharing a common border, but they also reside along Route 34, which sits only about a mile away from Sandwich High School. Both schools were charter members of the Little Ten Conference, which tied them together as far back as 1919. Sandwich also followed Plano's departure from the conference in 1967, so it is fair to say that both are tied to the other's history. The rivalry game was traditionally played during the Sandwich Fair, on the Friday or 3rd Day of the Fair. Usually after the game, fans of both schools, whose strong rivalry generally carries over off of the field and into the fairgrounds, resulting in taunting and fighting between the fans throughout the rest of the night of the game. This was the case until 2006, when the conference added four more schools into the then eight member conference, resulting in a conference divisional split and the schools being placed in opposite divisions based on size. It was then decided that the game would be moved back later into the season to accommodate more teams earlier in the season. However, Plano grew in size, and was allowed to replace one of the smaller schools in the other division, and both schools were together once again. The schools have competed against each other since, with Sandwich having won the most recent meeting against the two high schools.

== Activities ==
Sandwich has approximately 20 clubs and organizations:

- Future Farmers of America (FFA)
- Fellowship of Christian Athletes (FCA)
- Tri-M Music Honor Society (Tri-M)
- National Honor Society (NHS)
- Future Educators of America (FEA)
- Worldwide Youth in Science and Engineering (WYSE)
- DCP-SAFE (DeKalb County Partnership for a Substance Abuse Free Environment)
- SADD (Students Against Destructive Decisions)
- SHS Student Leadership Council (SLC)
- SHS History Club
- SHS Computer Club
- SHS Writing Club
- SHS Science Club
- SHS Fine Arts Club
- SHS French Club (Defunct since 2007)
- Kendall County Project SNOWBALL
- SHS Spanish Club
- SHS Drama Club
- SHS Yearbook
- SHS Student Council

== Music Program ==
Sandwich's bands and choirs have performed in multiple states, and some provinces in Canada. The bands have been invited to, and attended the 54th, 55th, 56th, 57th, and 58th Presidential Inaugurations and performed at the corresponding Presidential Inaugural Festival at the University of Maryland in College Park, MD. During the 2005 Inaugural Festival the band received the "Spirit of Washington" award, which honored bands for their courteous nature. The competitive marching band, the "Renegade Regiment", has received multiple championships in class A and AA. In 2006, the Renegade Regiment played during the Calgary Stampede in the World Indoor Marching Band Championships, which were held at the Scotiabank Saddledome in Calgary. The band received 5th Place, and had the honorary title of being the 5th best band in the world. The bands and choirs are also involved in the Illinois Music Educators Association (IMEA) Festivals, IHSA music sweepstakes, and the Interstate Eight Band/Choir Festival.

=== Wind Ensemble ===
This band is open to students through chair auditions, which also determine placement within the respective sections. This band has been in existence since 2006, when it was split from the Concert Band due to size constraints of the room being used for practice. The Wind Ensemble is regarded as the Honor Band, while the Concert Band is for anybody that takes the Concert Band class. The 2008-2009 Wind Ensemble was in participation in the 2009 Inaugural Festival, while members of the 2006-2008 Wind Ensemble were participants in the 2005 Inaugural Festival, as the band had not yet split into the Wind Ensemble and Concert Band. Prior to the 2005-2006 School year, the school had a single Concert Band, having only split into two bands due to an increase in size which would exceed the capability of the existing band room to accommodate.

=== Concert Band ===
Open to all without a need for tryout, aside to judge placement within the section, the Concert Band is the larger of the two bands, and it, along with the Wind Ensemble comprise all the students who participate in other Music program events and activities.

=== Jazz Band ===
The Jazz Band is open to students who wish to play jazz/blues pieces, or for those who wish to learn a new instrument in the process. Jazz I is for beginner students, or students inexperienced in either playing a new instrument or in playing in the Jazz Band. Jazz II is for more experienced students, and entrance into it is through tryout. The Jazz Band has played in multiple places throughout the country, with a trip to Kansas City in 2007 having been the most recent.

=== Pep Band ===
The Pep Band is a band that plays during the Basketball season, ranging from November until January. The band does not require a tryout, and the band is more of a 'fun' band than its more serious counterparts in the department.

=== Marching Indians ===
The Marching Indians is a band that until recently, was mandatory for students to take part in, so that the band classes would satisfy the Phys. Ed. exemption requirement for the school. The band is now voluntary, with some component of it still mandatory for students. The band does field drills during halftime, and it plays in the endzone during football games in the fall.

=== Renegade Regiment ===
The Renegade Regiment is the competitive marching band for Sandwich High School, and has had a long life in the MACBDA marching band circuit. The Renegade Regiment, or 'Regiment' for short, was started by SHS tenured band director, Terry Wickwire, who was a former US Air Force musician. The band, started in the late 1970s, has competed in numerous competitions. In the summer, the band would perform in southern Wisconsin, in places near and around Madison, along with doing a multitude of parades in the Western Suburbs of Chicago. The Regiment had a short-lived band competition, which was held at the high school for only a couple of years, but more emphasis was put on its fall counterpart. In the fall, the band would do competitions around the Chicago suburbs, and as an end to the Regiment season, the band would hold an invitational competition at the high school, known as "Musicfest". In 2006, the band had won its second class AA title, and received 5th Place at the World Indoor Marching Band Championships in Calgary, Alberta. The band has received at least two Class A titles, five consecutive Class AA titles, and they have received second and third at many shows while in the MACBDA circuit.

==== 2006 Tour-Minimally Speaking ====
Location	Place for Field	Class	Place for Parade	Best Winds	Best Drum Line	Best Guard	Best Drum Major	Grand Champion
Fort Atkinson, Wisconsin	2nd	AA						
Oregon, Wisconsin	3rd	Open						
Whitnall HS/Greenfield, Wisconsin	1st	AA						
Racine, Wisconsin	1st	AA						
Dakota, Illinois	1st	AA					X	
Traverse City, Michigan	4th	Open					X	
Janesville, Wisconsin	1st	AA					X	
MACBDA Finals-Sun Prairie, Wisconsin	1st	AA		X	X	X	X	
Dwight, Illinois	1st	AA	1st	X	X	X	X	X
A A Stagg HS/Palos Hills, Illinois	2nd	AA						
Downers Grove South HS/Downers Grove, Illinois	3rd	AA				X		
Marengo, Illinois	1st	AA		X		X		

==== 2007 Tour-Scheherazade ====
Location	Place for Field	Class	Place for Parade	Best Winds	Best Drum Line	Best Guard	Best Drum Major	Grand Champion
Fort Atkinson, Wisconsin	1st	AA						
Oregon, Wisconsin	1st	AA						
Sun Prairie, Wisconsin	1st	AA						
Racine, Wisconsin	1st	AA						
Dakota, Illinois	5th	Open						
Sioux Falls, South Dakota	1st	AA						
Saskatoon, Saskatchewan	2nd	AA						
World Indoor Marching Band Championships/Calgary, Alberta	5th	None						
MACBDA Finals/Calgary, Alberta	1st	AA						
Dwight, Illinois	EXH	AA						
Naperville Central HS Invitational/Lisle, Illinois	2nd	A						
Downers Grove South HS/Downers Grove, Illinois	3rd	AA						
Prospect Knight of Champions/Prospect Heights, Illinois	2nd	AA		X		X	X	
Marengo, Illinois	1st	AA	1st	X	X	X		

==== 2008 Tour ====
Location	Place for Field	Class	Place for Parade	Best Winds	Best Drum Line	Best Guard	Best Drum Major	Grand Champion
Naperville Central HS Invitational/Lisle, Illinois	1st	A				X	X	
Marengo, Illinois	1st	AA			X	X		

==== 2009 Tour ====
Location	Place for Field	Class	Place for Parade	Best Winds	Best Drum Line	Best Guard	Best Drum Major	Grand Champion
Prospect Knight of Champions/Prospect Heights, Illinois	8th	AA						
Marengo, Illinois	1st	AA	2nd	X		X		

== Notable alumni ==
- Garrett Gilkey (born 1990), former American football guard who attended the school in his freshman year
- Timothy McCune (born 1963), American business executive, Class of 1981
- Dave Graf (born 1917), Though not an alumnus, but Industrial Arts Teacher 1955 to 1976 (approx), won National Teacher of the Year in 1968, would always emphasize and nurture a student's natural talents. An extraordinary gentleman and asset to the school and community.
