= Garrett Gilkey =

American football player (born 1990)

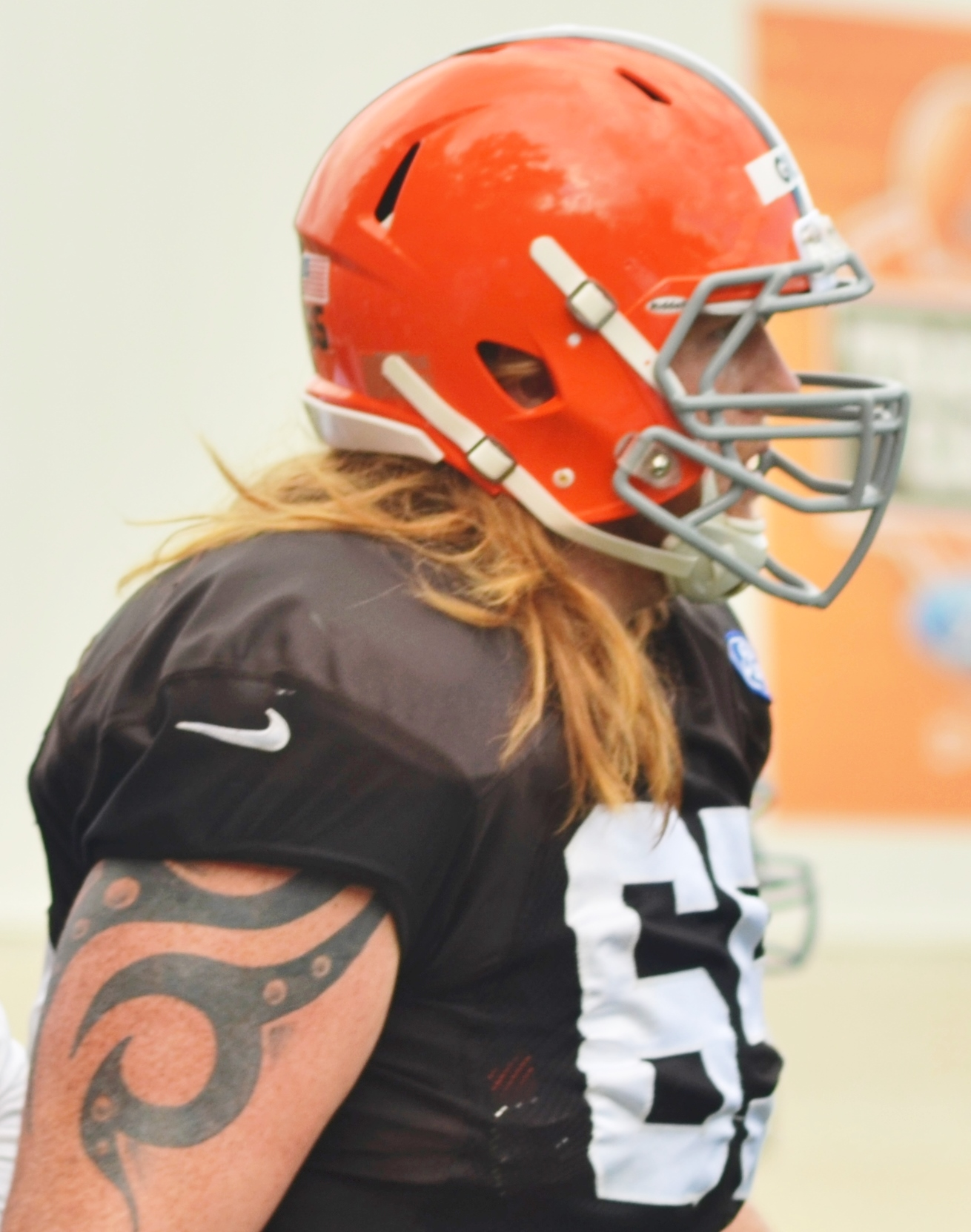
- Gilkey with the Cleveland Browns in 2013

No. 65, 72
- Position: Guard

Personal information
- Born: July 9, 1990 (age 36); Lemont, Illinois, U.S.
- Listed height: 6 ft 6 in (1.98 m)
- Listed weight: 320 lb (145 kg)

Career information
- High school: Aurora Christian (Aurora, Illinois)
- College: Chadron State
- NFL draft: 2013: 7th round, 227th overall pick

Career history
- Cleveland Browns (2013); Tampa Bay Buccaneers (2014–2015)

Career NFL statistics
- Games played: 22
- Games started: 2
- Stats at Pro Football Reference

Garrett Gilkey (born July 9, 1990) is an American former professional football player who was a guard in the National Football League (NFL). He played college football for the Chadron State Eagles. He was selected by the Cleveland Browns in the seventh round of the 2013 NFL draft and also played for the Tampa Bay Buccaneers.

== Early life and college ==
Gilkey was born in Lemont, Illinois, a village southwest of Chicago. Gilkey grew up in Naperville and moved with his parents and four siblings to the town of Sandwich, Illinois at age 12. As a freshman, Gilkey attended Sandwich Community High School but transferred to Aurora Christian High School in nearby Aurora.

After graduating from Aurora Christian High in 2008, Gilkey enrolled at Chadron State College, an NCAA Division II school in northwestern Nebraska. At Chadron State, Gilkey played in 37 games with 34 starts and earned first-team All-American honors from D2Football.com. Gilkey was one of three Division II players invited to the 2012 Senior Bowl.

== Professional career ==
=== Cleveland Browns ===
On April 27, 2013, Gilkey was selected by the Cleveland Browns in the seventh round with the 227th overall pick in the 2013 NFL draft. On May 24, 2013, he agreed to a four-year deal with the Browns.

=== Tampa Bay Buccaneers ===
Gilkey was claimed off waivers by the Tampa Bay Buccaneers on September 1, 2014. On July 26, 2016, Gilkey was waived by Tampa Bay due to a failed physical.

== Personal life ==
Gilkey received a Master of Engineering from the University of Alabama at Birmingham and his MBA from the Indiana University Bloomington. He is the president and CEO of HGC Development Group, a design-build firm based in Tampa, Florida.
