= Ottawa Township High School =

Coordinates: 41°20′42.7″N 88°50′15.4″W

Location
- 211 E Main St; Ottawa, LaSalle County, Illinois; United States

Information
- Type: Public
- Established: 1897
- School district: 140
- Superintendent: Michael Cushing
- Principal: Pat Leonard
- Teaching staff: 93.00 (FTE)
- Grades: 9–12
- Enrollment: 1,270 (2023-2024)
- Student to teacher ratio: 13.66
- Colors: Crimson and white
- Athletics: Cross Country, Basketball, Swimming, Baseball, Football, Tennis, Soccer, Wrestling,
- Athletics conference: Interstate Eight
- Mascot: Sudsy
- Nickname: Pirates
- Website: www.ottawahigh.com

Ottawa Township High School, or Ottawa High School, is a high school located at 211 East Main Street in Ottawa, IL.

== Buildings ==
The school comprises three buildings, each with three stories. The main building is the first building seen upon approaching the school. It contains floors 100, 200, and 300 as well as the main offices and the library. Its classes are mostly vocational in nature but also has some English and Math. The Manual Arts Building is to the east of the main building and has floors 400, 500, and 600 as well as the cafeteria and Kingman Gymnasium. This building is devoted to the social sciences and manual arts as well as the special education program. The MacRae Shannon Building is named for a former principal and is the newest building. It is located behind the Main building and contains floors 700, 800, and 900. This building houses the majority of the Science, and Math classes as well as music and fine arts. The 900 and 300 floors contain the Freshman Academy, containing various classes, except for foreign language and fine arts.

== Athletics ==
The school's athletic team, known as the Pirates, competed in the North Central Illinois Conference for decades. Beginning with the 2010–2011 school year, they are competing in the newly formed Northern Illinois Big 12 Conference. Beginning with 2019-2020 they will compete in the Interstate 8 (I-8) Conference.

== Notable alumni ==
- Steve Brusatte (2002), paleontologist
- Michael Hermosillo, Los Angeles Angel, Chicago Cub
- Maria Kanellis (2000), Former WWE Diva
- Aaron Shea, Michigan Wolverines, Cleveland Browns
