= Youth in Music Band Championships =

Music organizations based in the United States

- Abbreviation: YIM, YIMMYs
- Formation: June 2005; 21 years ago
- Founded at: Minneapolis, Minnesota
- Region served: Upper Midwest, U.S.
- President: Brent Turner
- Parent organization: Youth in Music, Inc.
- Website: youthinmusic.org

The Youth in Music Band Championships is an annual high school marching band competition in Minneapolis, Minnesota. It is one of the largest marching band events in the Upper Midwest, attracting three dozen competitors and thousands of spectators every year from many U.S. states. The competition has been called YIM Grand Championships, YIM Upper Midwest Championships, and the YIMMYs.

The first championship was held in 2005. Since 2006, state championship honors have been awarded to competing bands from Minnesota.

== History ==
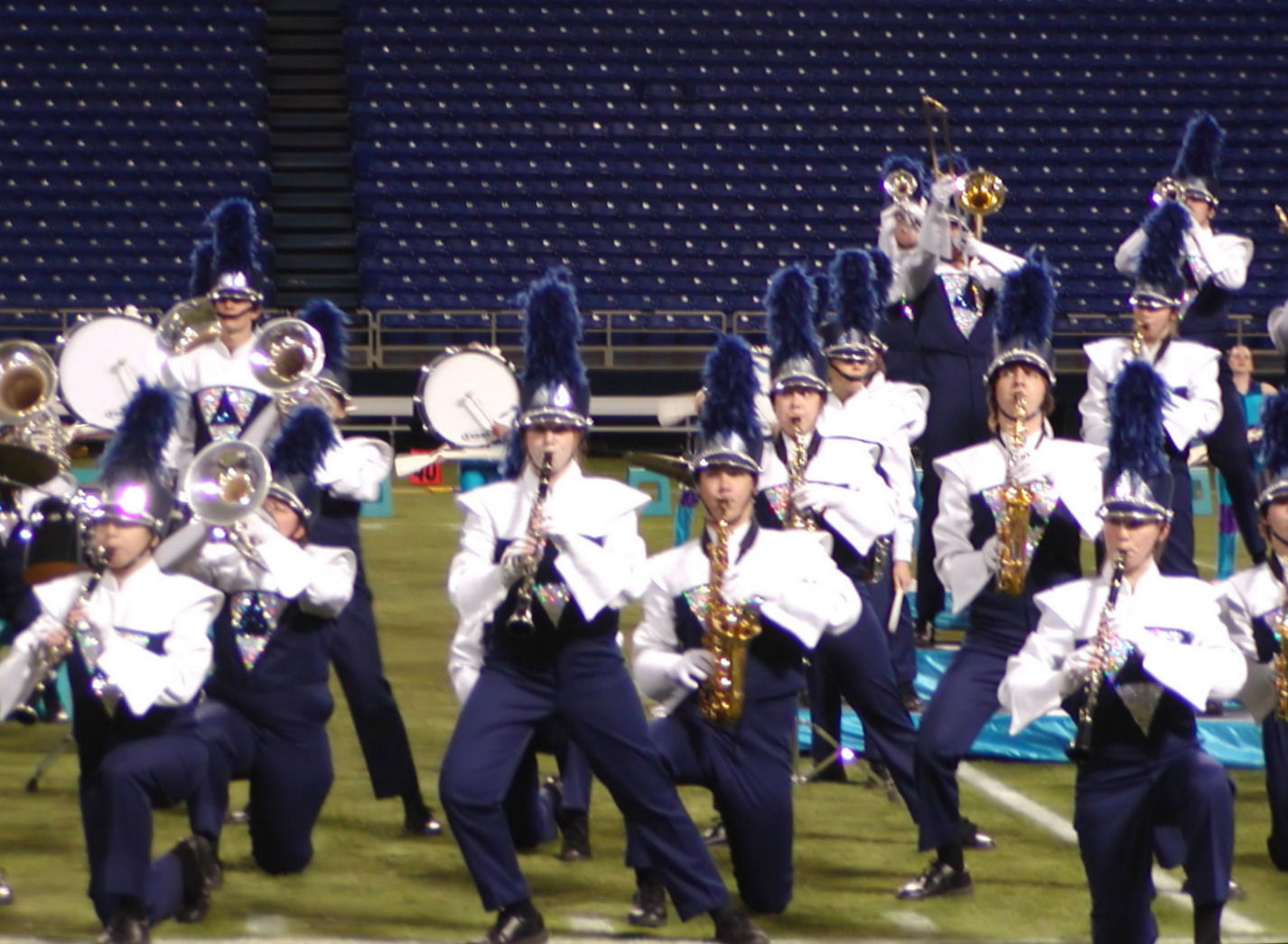
Rosemount High School's finals performance in 2006.

=== Past participants ===
Bands from Minnesota, Illinois, Wisconsin, Iowa, South Dakota and Nebraska have attended YIM since its inception. The following is an incomplete list of recent and past participating bands.

^{†} Indicates a past participant.

==== Illinois bands ====
- South High School^{†}, Downers Grove
- Lincoln-Way Community High School District 210
  - Lincoln-Way Central High School^{†}, New Lenox
  - Lincoln-Way East High School^{†}, Frankfort

==== Iowa bands ====
- MOC-Floyd Valley High School^{†}, Orange City
- Sioux City Community Schools
  - North High School^{†}, Sioux City
  - West High School^{†}, Sioux City

==== Minnesota bands ====
- Anoka-Hennepin School District 11
  - Andover High School, Andover
  - Anoka High School, Anoka
  - Blaine High School, Blaine
  - Champlin Park High School, Champlin
  - Coon Rapids High School, Coon Rapids
- Eden Prairie High School, Eden Prairie
- Farmington High School, Farmington
- Grand Rapids High School, Grand Rapids
- Hastings High School, Hastings
- Independent School District 196
  - Eastview High School, Apple Valley, Minnesota
  - Rosemount High School, Rosemount
- Irondale High School, New Brighton
- Lakeville South High School, Lakeville
- Luverne High School, Luverne
- Maple Grove Senior High School, Maple Grove
- Marshall High School, Marshall
- Minnetonka High School, Minnetonka
- Osseo High School, Osseo
- Park Center High School, Brooklyn Park
- Pipestone Area High School, Pipestone
- Rochester Lourdes High School, Rochester
- Rocori High School^{†}, Cold Spring
- Waseca High School, Waseca

==== South Dakota bands ====
- Brandon Valley High School, Brandon
- Brookings High School, Brookings
- Harrisburg High School, Harrisburg
- Mitchell High School, Mitchell
- Sioux Falls School District
  - Lincoln High School, Sioux Falls
  - Roosevelt High School, Sioux Falls

==== Nebraska bands ====
- Bellevue East High School, Bellevue
- Millard North High School, Omaha
- Millard West High School, Omaha
- Papillion-La Vista South High School, Papillion

==== Wisconsin bands ====
- Chippewa Falls High School, Chippewa Falls
- North High School, Eau Claire
- Menomonie High School^{†}, Menomonie
- River Falls High School, River Falls
- West De Pere High School^{†}, De Pere

=== Past championship locations ===
Year	Venue
2005–2013	Hubert H. Humphrey Metrodome; Minneapolis, Minnesota
2014–2015	Farmington Senior High School; Minneapolis, Minnesota
2016–present	U.S. Bank Stadium; Minneapolis, Minnesota

== Classification and adjudication ==
YIM utilizes their own Adjudication Handbook and have created their own adjudication sheets. Tabulation software is provided by Competition Suite.

=== Classifications ===
Three classes, A, AA, AAA, have been available since 2005. In 2016, AAAA Class was added. Criteria for class alignment is unknown. However, an archived FAQ from 2007 suggested participating bands consider school attendance, the number of performing members, booster organization, experience of staff and other qualitative information when selecting a class.

=== Captions and rubric ===
Scoring is based on two broad categories: Performance, and Effect. The categories are further divided into four reference criteria or captions, with each given a maximum value of 200 points, or up to 20 points when factored. Percussion and Auxiliary (or color guard) captions are also available. Both given a maximum value of 100 points, or ten points when factored. The final score is tabulated by adding all captions, less any penalties.

Captions and their maximum values are:
Category	Effect	+	Performance	=	Points
Music	Music Effect (200) / 10	+	Music Performance (200) / 10	=	50.00
Music	Music Effect (200) / 10	+	Percussion (100) / 10	=	50.00
Visual	Visual Effect (200) / 10	+	Visual Performance (200) / 10	=	50.00
Visual	Visual Effect (200) / 10	+	Auxiliary (100) / 10	=	50.00
			Subtotal	=	100.00
			Timing & Penalties	=	0.00
			Total	=	100.00

One adjudicator is assigned to each caption, and one each for percussion and auxiliary. An additional adjudicator is responsible for timing and penalties.

YIM does have captions for Best Visual, Best Colorguard, Best Percussion Section, YIMMY Drum Major and YIMMY Best Performer Overall. Youth in Music also honors a YIMMY Hall of Fame Band Director each year.

== Awards and honors ==
As of 2017, the top scoring band in each class, and the next six highest scoring bands from the first, preliminary, round advance to the final round. The two rounds are called Sessions I and II by competition organizers. Following the preliminary round, caption awards for "Outstanding Percussion", "Outstanding Winds", and "Outstanding Color Guard" which are given to recipients in each class.

=== YIMMY awards ===
Recognition is also given to "Best Drum Major" and "Best Performer" in response to their performance excellence. The "Spirit of YIMMY" award is given to one band each year in recognition for their esprit de corps. The criteria for these awards is unknown.

An award memorializing musician Butch DuFault is given to an outstanding band director. YIM has awarded academic scholarships to participating students in the past.

=== Minnesota State Marching Band Championships ===
YIM began awarding state championship honors in 2006. The format for such awards has varied. In 2017, honors were given to the top three highest scoring Minnesota bands in each class. A single state champion award has also been announced in years prior.

The inclusion of a state championship award was likely due to other Minnesota music education organizations lack of sanctioned marching band events. Minnesota State High School League (MSHSL), the Minnesota NFHS affiliate, organizes soloist and small ensemble festivals. The Minnesota Music Educators Association (MMEA), the Minnesota NAfME affiliate, organizes an All-State honor band program which includes concert and jazz bands. And the Minnesota Band Directors Association (MBDA) has issued guidelines for marching band performances, in addition to organizing an alternative All-State concert and jazz honor band, but not a marching band championship award of any kind.

== Past champions ==
YIM realigned the classes available in 2016. A Grand Champion award was not awarded in 2005.

Year	A	AA	AAA	—	Grand Champion
2005 (1st)	None	MOC-Floyd Valley (Iowa)	Irondale (Minnesota)		None
2006 (2nd)	Minnetonka (Minnesota)	MOC-Floyd Valley ^{(2)}	Rosemount (Minnesota)		Rosemount (Minnesota)
2007 (3rd)	Menomonie (Wisconsin)	Waseca (Minnesota)	Rosemount ^{(2)}		Rosemount ^{(2)}
2008 (4th)	Coon Rapids (Minnesota)	Downers Grove South (Illinois)	Rosemount ^{(3)}		Rosemount ^{(3)}
2009 (5th)	Anoka (Minnesota)	West De Pere (Wisconsin)	Rosemount ^{(4)}		Rosemount ^{(4)}
2010 (6th)	Hastings (Minnesota)	Rochester Lourdes (Minnesota)	Rosemount ^{(5)}		Rosemount ^{(5)}
2011 (7th)	Hastings ^{(2)}	Waseca ^{(2)}	Rosemount ^{(6)}		Rosemount ^{(6)}
2012 (8th)	Hastings ^{(3)}	Waseca ^{(3)}	Rosemount ^{(7)}		Rosemount ^{(7)}
2013 (9th)	Hastings ^{(4)}	Waseca ^{(4)}	Rosemount ^{(8)}		Rosemount ^{(8)}
2014 (10th)	Hastings ^{(5)}	Chippewa Falls (Wisconsin)	Rosemount ^{(9)}		Rosemount ^{(9)}
2015 (11th)	Champlin Park (Minnesota)	Rochester Lourdes ^{(2)}	Eden Prairie (Minnesota)		Eden Prairie (Minnesota)
Year	A	AA	AAA	AAAA	Grand Champion
2016 (12th)	Anoka ^{(2)}	Minnetonka (Minnesota)	Roosevelt	Rosemount (Minnesota)	Rosemount ^{(10)}
2017 (13th)	Hastings ^{(6)}	Rochester Lourdes ^{(3)}	Roosevelt ^{(2)}	Rosemount ^{(2)}	Rosemount ^{(11)}
2018 (14th)	Anoka ^{(3)}	Rochester Lourdes ^{(4)}	Roosevelt ^{(3)}	Rosemount ^{(3)}	Rosemount ^{(12)}
2019 (15th)	Andover (Minnesota)	Hastings (Minnesota)	Millard West (Nebraska)	Rosemount ^{(4)}	Rosemount ^{(13)}
2020 (16th)	No championships				
2021 (17th)	Lakeville South (Minnesota)	Farmington (Minnesota)	Millard West ^{(2)}	Rosemount ^{(5)}	Rosemount ^{(14)}
2022 (18th)	Hastings ^{(7)}	Lakeville South (Minnesota)	Millard West ^{(3)}	Rosemount ^{(6)}	Rosemount ^{(15)}
2023 (19th)	Hastings ^{(8)}	Lakeville South ^{(2)}	Millard West ^{(4)}	Rosemount ^{(7)}	Rosemount ^{(16)}
2024 (20th)	Anoka ^{(3)}	Mankato Area (Minnesota)	Irondale ^{(3)}	Rosemount ^{(8)}	Rosemount ^{(17)}
2025 (21st)	Harrisburg	Mankato Area ^{(2)}	Irondale ^{(4)}	Rosemount ^{(9)}	Rosemount ^{(18)}
2026 (22nd)	Rochester Lourdes	Roosevelt	Irondale ^{(5)}	Rosemount ^{(10)}	Rosemount ^{(19)}

=== Minnesota State Marching Band Champions ===
Below is an incomplete list of Minnesota State Marching Band Champions awarded at YIM:

Year	A	AA	AAA	AAAA
2016	Anoka	Minnetonka	Grand Rapids	Rosemount
2017	Hastings	Rochester Lourdes	Grand Rapids	Rosemount
2018	Anoka	Rochester Lourdes	Grand Rapids	Rosemount
2019	Andover	Hastings	None	Rosemount
2020	No championships			
2021	Lakeville South	Farmington	Irondale	Rosemount
2022	Hastings	Lakeville South	Irondale	Rosemount
2023	Hastings	Lakeville South	Irondale	Rosemount
2024	Anoka	Mankato Area	Irondale	Rosemount
2025	Coon Rapids	Mankato Area	Irondale	Rosemount
2026	Rochester Lourdes	Waseca	Irondale	Rosemount

== See also ==
- Bands of America
- Mid-America Competing Band Directors Association
- Northwest Association for Performing Arts
- Western Band Association
