= Ed Brady (American football) =

American football player (born 1962)

No. 90, 55, 53
- Positions: Linebacker, long snapper

Personal information
- Born: June 17, 1962 (age 64); Morris, Illinois, U.S.
- Listed height: 6 ft 2 in (1.88 m)
- Listed weight: 238 lb (108 kg)

Career information
- High school: Morris
- College: Illinois
- NFL draft: 1984: 8th round, 215th overall pick

Career history
- Los Angeles Rams (1984–1985); Cincinnati Bengals (1986–1991); Tampa Bay Buccaneers (1992–1995)

Career NFL statistics
- Games played: 188
- Fumble recoveries: 5
- Tackles: 1
- Stats at Pro Football Reference

Ed John Brady (born June 17, 1962) is an American former professional football player who was a linebacker in the National Football League (NFL). He played college football for the Illinois Fighting Illini.

Brady was raised in Morris, Illinois, and attended Morris Community High School, where he led the Morris Redskins football team to a state championship. Brady played for the University of Illinois and was a member of the 1983 team which lost to UCLA 45–9 in the Rose Bowl.

Brady spent 12 seasons in the National Football League (NFL). He was selected by the Los Angeles Rams in the eighth round of the 1984 NFL draft, and played for the Los Angeles Rams, Cincinnati Bengals and Tampa Bay Buccaneers. As a member of the Bengals, he played in Super Bowl XXIII in 1989 in which Cincinnati lost to the San Francisco 49ers 20–16. Listed as a linebacker, Brady only played a handful of downs at that position. He played more than 180 career NFL games as a long snapper. He was the captain of the Tampa Bay Buccaneers special teams unit from 1992 to 1995. He retired in 1996 after failing to make the roster for the Jacksonville Jaguars.

Following his playing career, Brady became a high school football coach in Irvine, California. He currently is coaching inside linebackers and special teams at Lakota East High School in Liberty Township, Ohio.
