= Irondale High School =

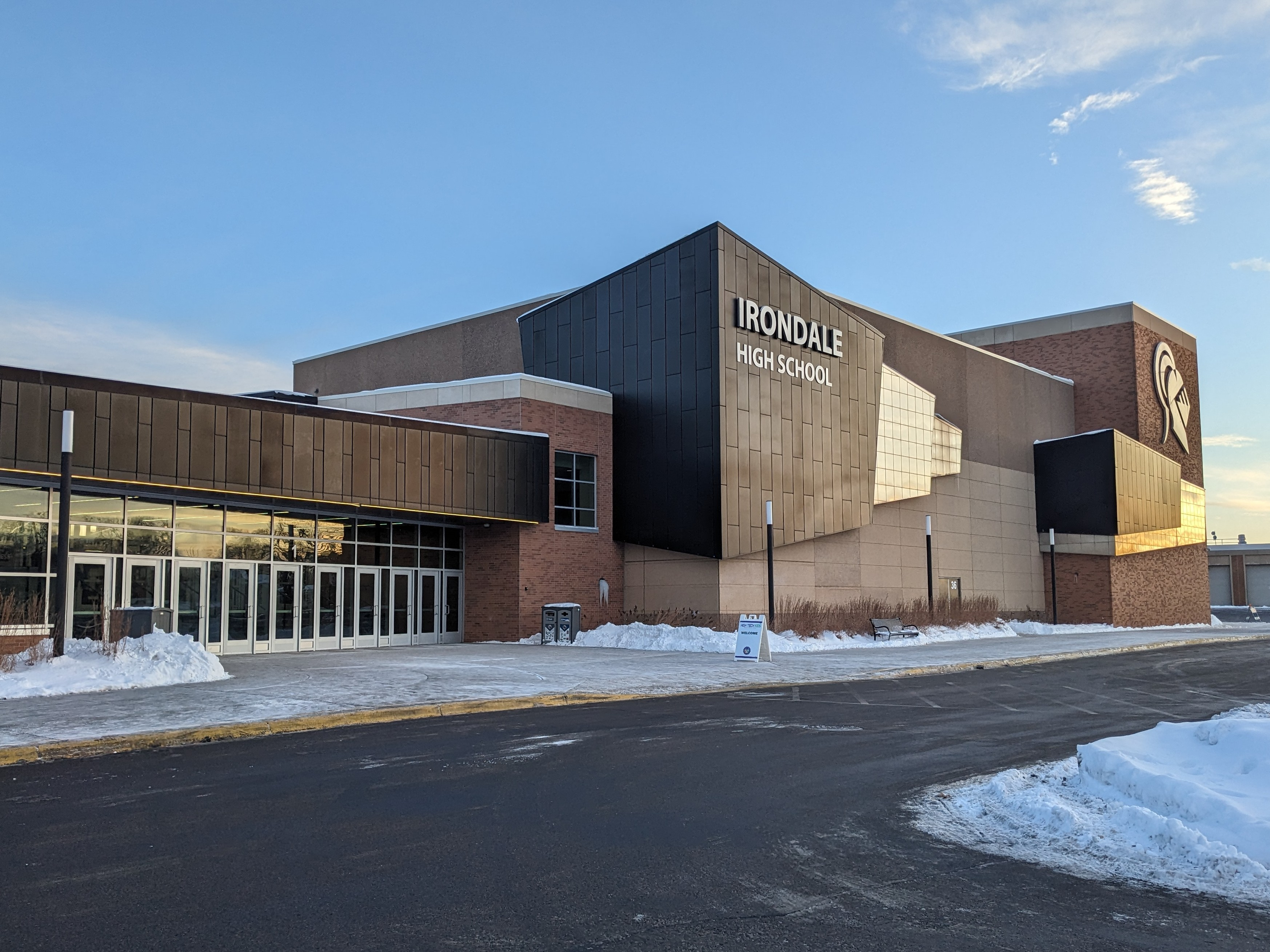
- South entrance

Location
- 2425 Long Lake Road; New Brighton, Minnesota 55112; United States; 45.09035°N 93.2072°W

Information
- Type: Public
- Motto: Iron Sharpens Iron
- Established: 1967
- School district: Mounds View Public Schools
- Principal: Vichai Saefong
- Teaching staff: 88.36 (on FTE basis)
- Grades: 9–12
- Enrollment: 1,812 (2024–2025)
- Student to teacher ratio: 20.51
- Colors: Maroon and Gold
- Athletics conference: MSHSL Region 5A
- Mascot: Knight
- Team name: Irondale Knights or The Knights
- Website: irondale.mvpschools.org

Irondale High School is a public high school in New Brighton, Minnesota, United States. Part of the Mounds View Public Schools district, the school is in a suburban area ten miles north of downtown Minneapolis and Saint Paul. Irondale made headlines in 2011 when it introduced its Early College program, which began in the 2012–13 school year. The program, run in conjunction with Anoka-Ramsey Community College, allows students to graduate in four years with both a high school diploma and an associate's degree (up to one and a half years toward a degree and/or a minor). This program prompted a visit from US Secretary of Education Arne Duncan, who praised Minnesota's efforts to further education.

Irondale hosts grades 9–12, and was founded in 1967. It is one of two high schools in the Mounds View Public school district (621); the other is Mounds View High School.

== Academics and recognition ==
In 2024, U.S. News & World Report ranked Irondale High School #3,322 on its list of the best high school in the United States, and #60 in Minnesota.

In 2010, Newsweek listed Irondale in the top 5% of high schools in the country based on how much the faculty challenges students by offering AP/IB/Cambridge tests and college-level courses to students.

Irondale was the first high school in Minnesota to offer a comprehensive Early College program.

During the 2006–07 school year, the school met all of the requirements for Adequate Yearly Progress and had an AYP graduation rate of 99.05%. The school offers Advanced Placement classes and participates in the University of Minnesota's College in the Schools program. Nearly 90% of students pursue post-secondary options.

== Extracurricular activities ==
Irondale sponsors additional activities that students may participate in.

=== Sports ===
- Football
- Hockey
- Basketball
- Volleyball
- Soccer
- Softball
- Baseball
- Cross Country
- Track and Field
- Swimming
- Tennis
- Ultimate Frisbee
- Dance
- Gymnastics
- Wrestling
- Alpine Skiing
- Nordic Skiing
- Golf
- Lacrosse
- Adapted Hockey
- Adapted Soccer
- Adapted Softball

=== Activities ===
- Band
- Choir
- Drama
- Dance Club
- E-sports
- Hackysack Club
- Marching Band
- Math Team
- Mock Trial
- National Honors Society
- Orchestra
- Quiz Bowl
- Robotics
- Speech
- Stripes
- Trap Shooting
- Winter Drumline
- Winter Guard

==== Robotics ====
Irondale has a FIRST Robotics Competition Team, number 2052, named KnightKrawler. It was showcased at Pinewood Elementary School in 2023. In 2016 it was a finalist in the Carson Division at FIRST Championship - St. Louis. The same year, it won the Chairman's Award at the Minnesota 10,000 Lakes Regional.

==== Band programs ====
===== Marching band =====
Irondale’s marching band has a history of competitive success. The band was the first Minnesota state champion at the 2005 Youth in Music Band Championships held annually at U.S. Bank Stadium. In 2010, the Irondale Marching Knights took first place in the AA class at the St. Louis Bands of America super regional. They were also declared the Class AAA champion at the 2024, 2025, and the 2026 Youth in Music Band Championships. They were also declared the Minnesota Class AAA state Champion in 2021, 2022, 2023, 2024, 2025 and 2026, also at the Youth in Music Band Championships.

===== Winter drumline =====
Irondale's winter drumline was named the Minnesota Percussion Associations State Champion in 1996, 2008, 2009, 2013, 2014, 2016, 2017, 2018, 2019, 2023, and 2025. At the 2003 Winter Guard International World Championships, the Drumline was the WGI Percussion Scholastic Open class Bronze Medalists. They were Scholastic A class finalists at WGI Championships in 2016 and 2017, placing 7th and 8th respectively out of over 60 competing groups. In 2018, they continued their success at the national level as the Scholastic A class Silver Medalists by placing 2nd out of 64 groups. In 2022, they were again Scholastic A class finalists, placing 10th. In 2023, they were the Scholastic A Class Gold Medalists, becoming the first Minnesota group to win percussion gold at WGI.

===== Winter guard =====
Irondale's winter guard was the 2002 Scholastic Open Class World Champions at WGI championships. They were the North Star Circuit State Champions in 1993 and from 1996 to 2014..

== Notable alumni ==
- Lisa Bender is a Democratic politician from Minneapolis.
- Scott Bjugstad is a former Olympic and NHL forward (1984–92).
- Members of the band Information Society: Kurt Harland Larson, Paul Robb, and James Cassidy.
- Kate Knuth is a member of the Minnesota House of Representatives, representing District 50B (2007–2013).
- Road Warrior Animal (Joe Laurinaitis) was a member of the professional wrestling tag team The Road Warriors.
- Amanda Lee, the first female demonstration pilot with the Blue Angels fighter jet flight demonstration squadron.
- Lee A. Piché, a Roman Catholic bishop
- Randy Rasmussen is a former member of the Minnesota Vikings.
- Premal Shah is the co-founder and president of Kiva.org.
