= Von KleinSmid Mansion =

Historic house in Illinois, United States

- U.S. National Register of Historic Places
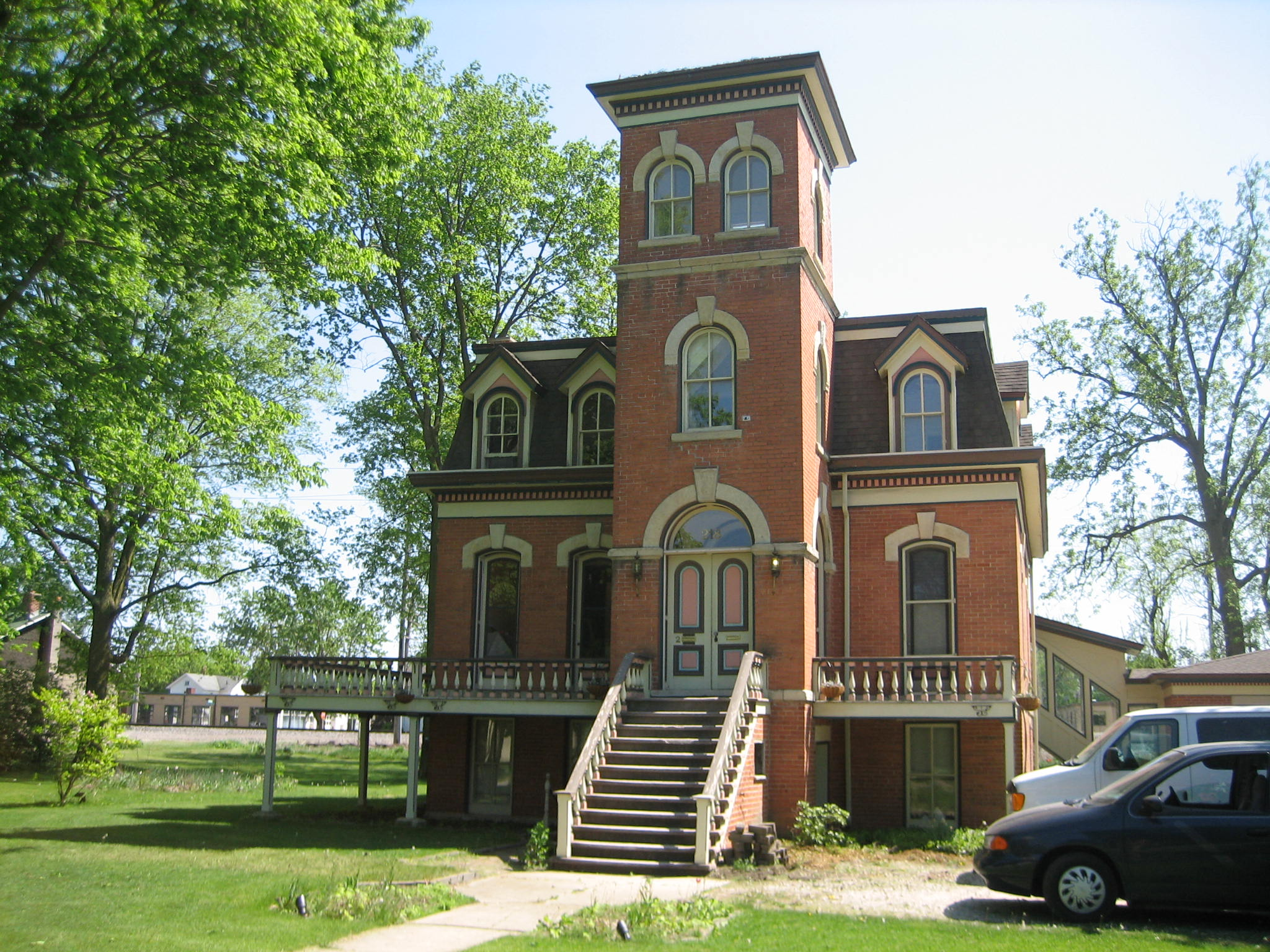

- Location within Illinois Location within the United States
- Location: 218 W. Center, Sandwich, Illinois
- Coordinates: 41°38′49″N 88°37′13″W
- Area: 1.3 acres (0.53 ha)
- Built: 1865
- Architectural style: Italian villa
- NRHP reference No.: 85000979
- Added to NRHP: May 9, 1985

The von KleinSmid Mansion was built for the von KleinSmid family of the DeKalb County city of Sandwich, Illinois, in the mid-nineteenth century. It was added to the National Register of Historic Places in 1985. The building is located on Sandwich's West Center Street, and is under private ownership.

It was the childhood home of Rufus B. von KleinSmid, former President and Chancellor of the University of Southern California (1921–1947, 1947–1964). He became known for his work in international relations and encouragement of foreign students at USC, as well as accomplishing a major capital building program. In the early 20th century, while studying criminal psychology, he became a passionate supporter of eugenics.
