= Sandwich City Hall =

- Sandwich City Hall & Opera House
- U.S. National Register of Historic Places
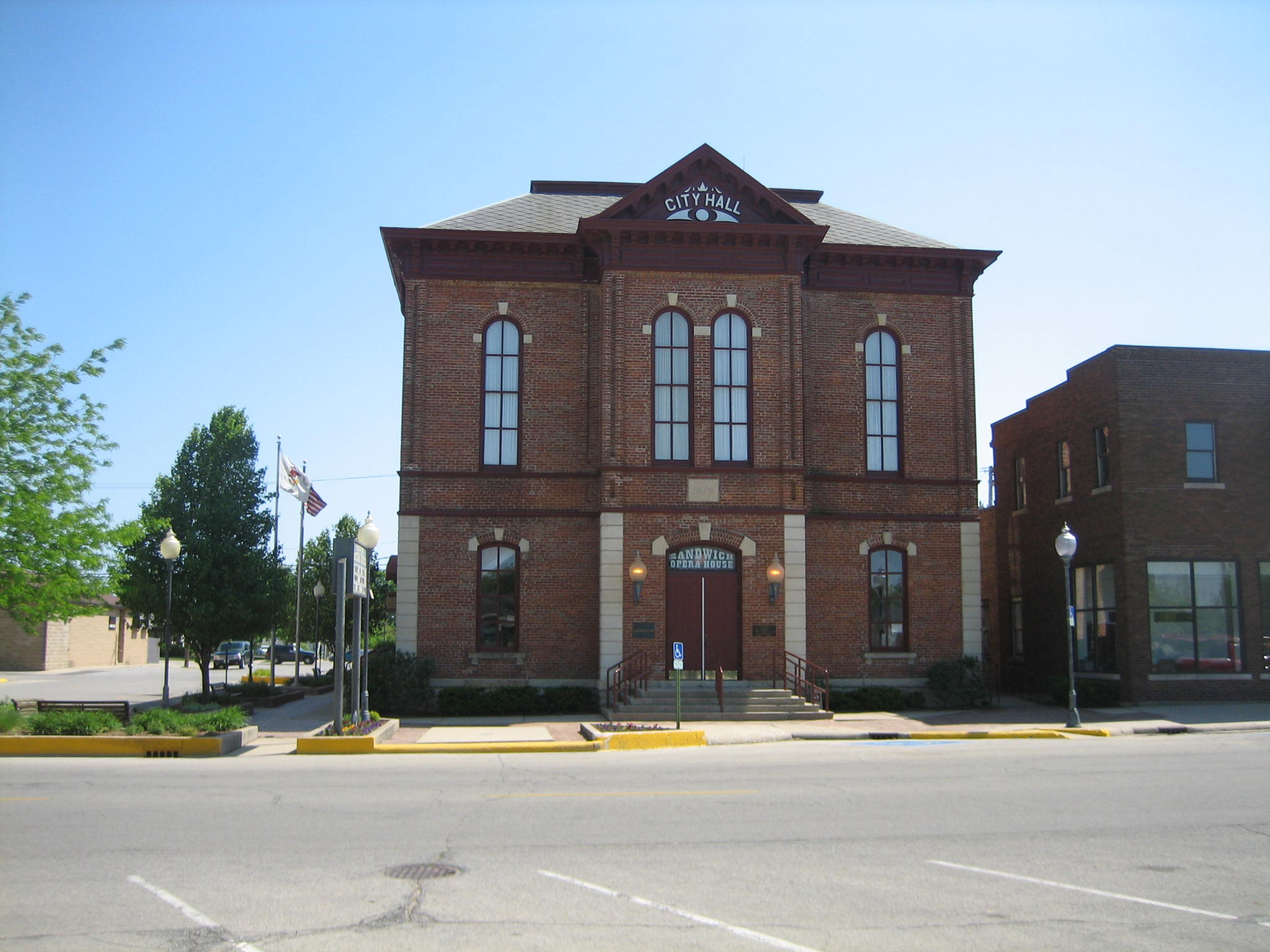

- Location within Illinois Location within the United States
- Location: 144 E. Railroad St., Sandwich, Illinois
- Coordinates: 41°38′49″N 88°37′13″W
- Area: less than one acre
- Built: 1878; 148 years ago
- Architect: Enos Doan & Israel Doan
- Architectural style: Second Empire
- NRHP reference No.: 79003159
- Added to NRHP: December 6, 1979

Sandwich City Hall, which is also known as the Sandwich City Hall & Opera House, is the government center for the city of Sandwich, Illinois, in DeKalb County. The first floor of the building is occupied by city government while the second floor of the historic building houses an active opera house. Sandwich City Hall & Opera House is listed on the National Register of Historic Places and has been since 1979.

== History ==
=== Construction and early years ===
Sandwich City Hall was constructed in 1878. This building reflects the post-Civil War Second Empire style, meant to evoke the spirit of the early years after a war that broke apart the purer architectural styles and mingled together in a mixture of revival styles. The construction was funded by a bond issue of $10,000 approved by the mayor and city aldermen in Sandwich. Eventually, a $2,000 cost overrun required additional bond issues. The city turned over the design of the structure to local architects Enos and Israel Doan. The building was completed on schedule in January 1879. The finished product was 48 by 80 feet. The first floor had 12 foot ceilings while the second floor included a balcony and 22 foot ceilings.

The building became a complete community center when it was completed. The first floor housed the mayor's office, the city clerk's office, council room, visiting judge's chambers, engine room and a marshall's office. The marshall's office had five jail cells. The upper floor of the building became the opera house. The opera house became an all-purpose theatre. It featured shows of all types, vaudevillian, Shakespearean, lectures, Women's Christian Temperance Union meetings, recitals, high school plays and graduations, church gatherings, firemen's ball and many other events. As other facilities became available to clientele the Opera House was left idle following World War II. City government offices continued to function within building despite the dormant theater above.

=== New life ===
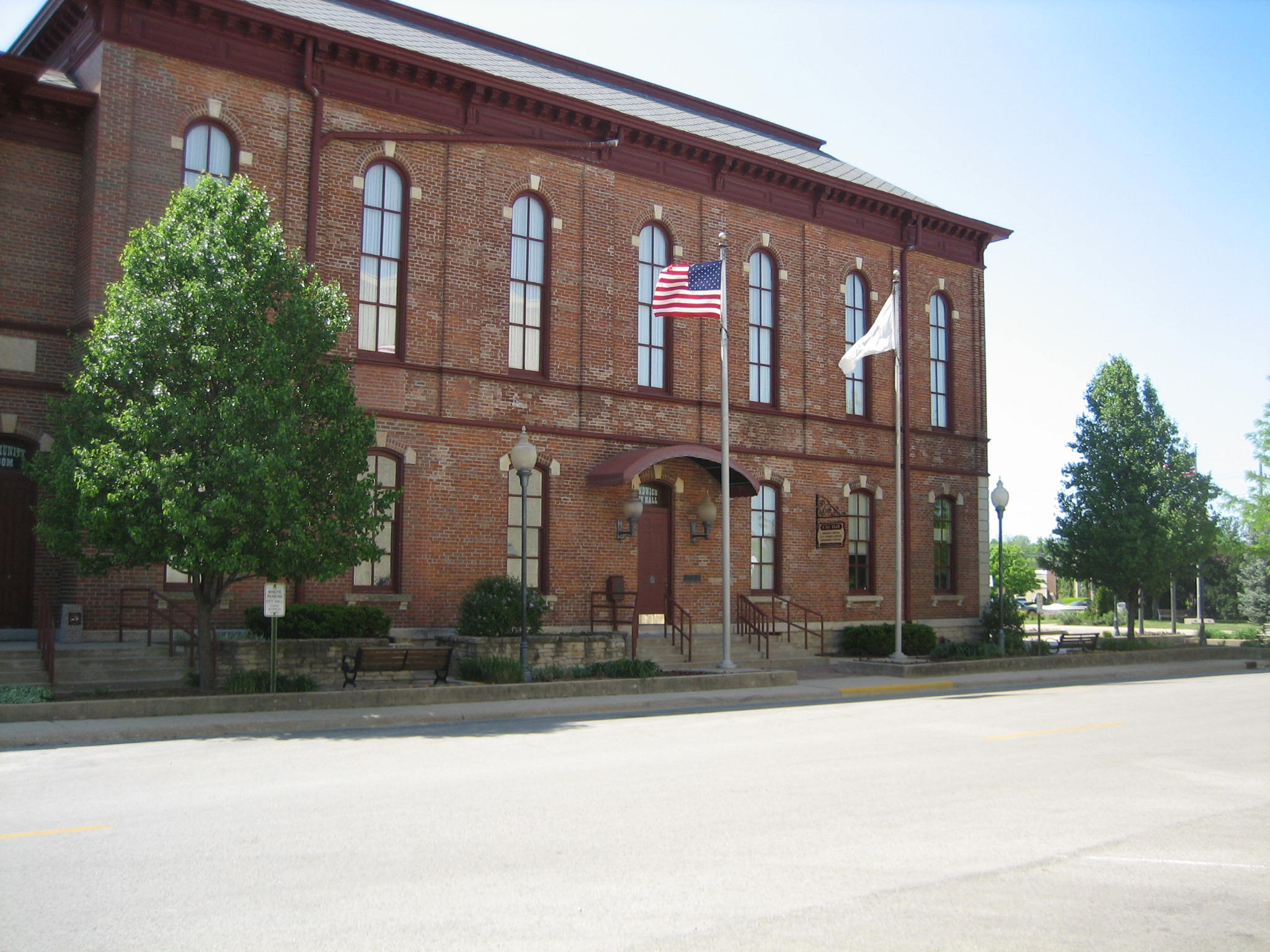
Sandwich City Hall from its east side

A community group was responsible for Sandwich City Hall's placement on the National Register in 1979. A few years later in 1982 the group, the Association to Restore City Hall, was given tax-exempt status and received a grant of nearly $1.3 million from the Illinois Department of Commerce and Community Affairs in 1983. The grant covered 75% of restoration and construction costs and the restoration was completed in 1986. The restoration provided new offices for many city government officials including the mayor, City Clerk, Assistant City Clerk, and City Engineer. In addition it provided for a public area where residents could pay bills or conduct other business.

The restoration also included an addition on the rear of the building. The addition provided for a community room on the first floor and on the second floor allowed for additional facilities for the opera house, including make up rooms and storage. Other areas to be restored and renovated included the foyers, the main entrance, the original walnut staircase on the west side of the building and a custom made stairway for the east are of the second floor was constructed. The police department and jail area ceased to be used in 1977 but the restoration incorporated it into the revamped structure. Though the jail area is now a women's restroom it still bears the old iron bars of the original jail cells, albeit fastened open.

When the restoration was completed in 1986 the city of Sandwich held a rededication ceremony that was attended by several state level political officials including then Lieutenant Governor George H. Ryan. The rededication was attended by numerous local officials as well.

The once-dormant Opera House portion of the city hall building is once again fully operational. With city government still operating on the first floor the opera house has a full season. Sandwich City Hall's second floor has become home to classical music performances, country-western ensembles, student recitals, bluegrass performances, dance, drama by the Indian Valley Theatre, pop performances, and numerous other events. The facility is available for rent based upon scheduling. In the first year following the 1986 restoration 18,725 people attended performances and programs of all types at the opera house.
