= Lyell E. Carr =

American painter (1854–1912)

- Born: 1854; Sandwich, Illinois
- Died: 1912 (aged 57–58)
- Occupation: Painter

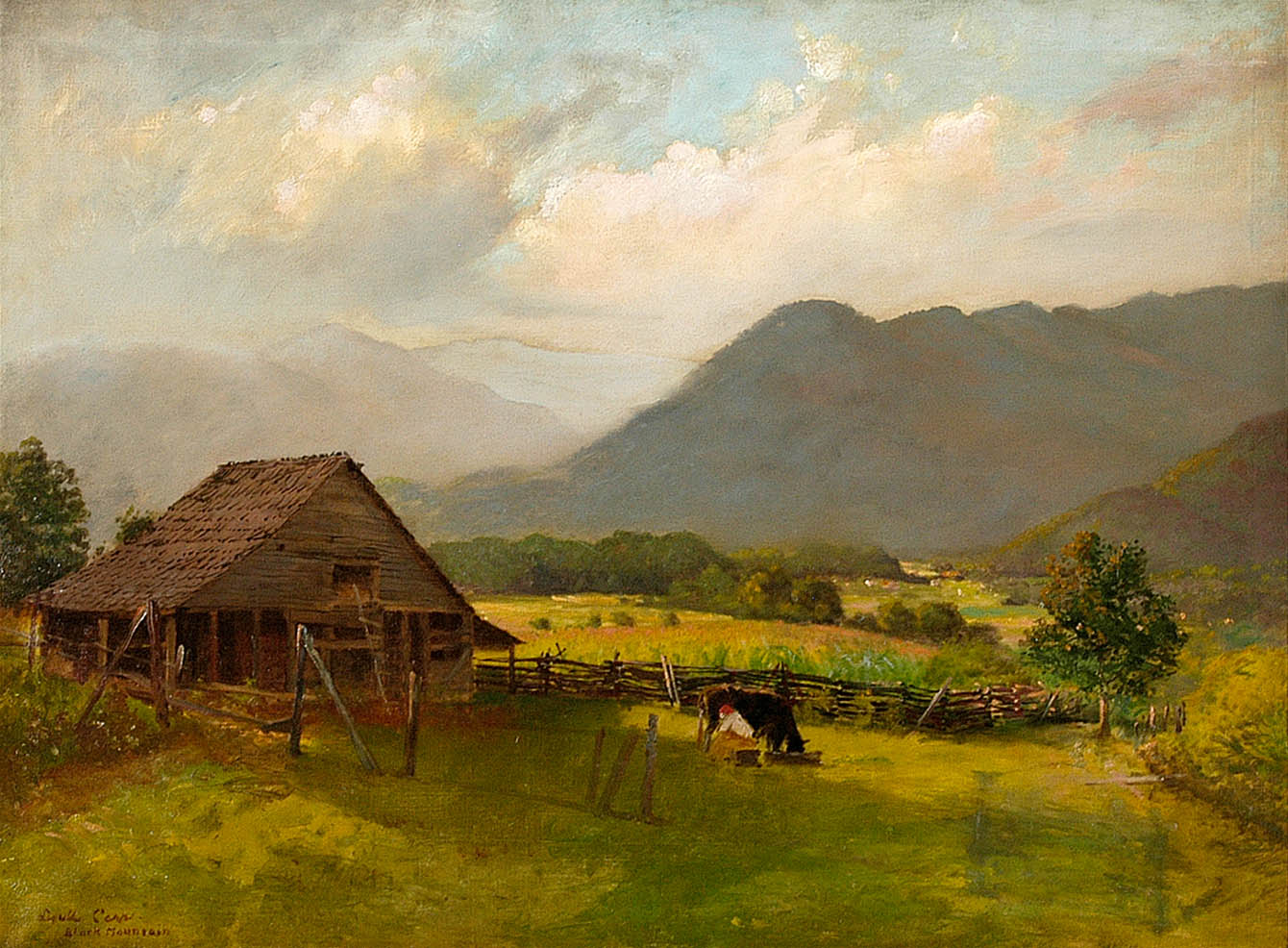
"Black Mountain"

Lyell E. Carr (1854–1912) was an American painter who painted scenes of African Americans and landscapes in the Deep South, especially Georgia in the 1890s. Carr painted in the Barbizon style.

== Biography ==
Carr was born in 1854 in Sandwich, Illinois. His first studio was located in Chicago. He moved to New York in the early 1880s, and then to Europe for a formal art education in 1884. His works gained national recognition in 1894 when praised by the magazine The Quarterly Illustrator as a successor to the paintings of Eastman Johnson and Winslow Homer.

His work is featured in the collection of the Morris Museum of Art in Augusta, Georgia, as well as the Johnson Collection in Spartanburg, South Carolina.
