= Columbus Saints Drum and Bugle Corps =

Drum and bugle corps based in Ohio, US

Columbus Saints
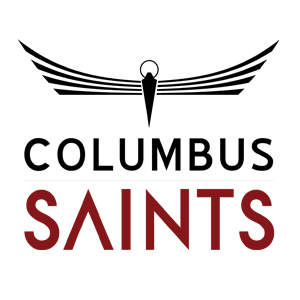
- Columbus Saints Performing Arts
- Location: Columbus, Ohio
- Division: DCA Class A DCI All-Age
- Founded: 2003; 23 years ago
- Founder and CEO: Marshall Cheatham
- Executive Director: Le Ron Carlton
- Website: columbussaints.org

Columbus Saints Drum and Bugle Corps is an all-age drum and bugle corps based in Columbus, Ohio. The corps is a member of Drum Corps Associates (DCA), and also competes in Drum Corps International All-Age Class.

== History ==
Founded as the Saints Drumline in 2003 by Marshall Cheatham; a social worker, and juvenile corrections officer, the corps began as an after-school musical outlet for kids. In 2012, the drumline expanded into a drum and bugle corps using a stock of G major bugles.

The corps partnered with the Boys & Girls Club of Columbus in 2014 to provide free music programs for club members in the Franklinton neighborhood. The "BOOM" performance ensemble resulted from this partnership.

From 2014 to 2018, the corps participated in DCI's SoundSport program, earning a bronze medal in 2014 and four silver medals from 2015 to 2018 at the SoundSport International Food & Music Festival in Indianapolis, Indiana. Furthermore, the corps earned its only gold medal at SoundSport Atlanta in 2016. The corps became members of the Mid-America Competing Band Directors Association (MACBDA) circuit in 2017, winning high drums in 2017 in Open Class and earning bronze medals in 2018 and 2019 in Open Class and Class A respectively.

The Saints completed a one-year residency at Flex High School, a charter school supported by the United Way of Central Ohio, in 2017. The residency allowed the corps to offer performance opportunities to students. Later that year, the corps applied to compete as a member of Drum Corps Associates (DCA). After an evaluation by DCA board members, the corps was approved for competition in Class A in June 2018.

Beginning in 2019, the Columbus Saints was approved for competition in Drum Corps International's All Age Division, which allows the corps to perform at a greater number of shows closer to Ohio, where DCA adjudicated shows are scarce due to the geographic location of the majority of DCA member corps. During the spring of 2019, the Columbus Saints equipment trailer was stolen, and with the assistance of local news, politicians, and law enforcement was recovered enabling the corps to continue its 2019 season.

As part of the 2021 non-competitive DCI season, the Saints performed at DCI shows, including the Indianapolis celebration, and livestreams.

== About ==
The corps is sponsored by the Saints Performing Arts, Inc., a 501(c)(3) organization. Marshall Cheatham is the founder and CEO, and the LeRon Carlton is executive director of the Saints's programs including the corps.

=== Mission and traditions ===
The corps' mission is "inspiring teamwork, discipline, and respect through the performing arts, in our Central Ohio community." The corps recites the "Saint's creed" to build morale and camaraderie prior to performances.

== Show summary (2014–2026) ==
Key
Turquoise background indicates DCA Class A Finalist

Year	Repertoire	Score	Placement
2014	Symphony No. 5 by Ludwig van Beethoven / Pachelbel's Canon by Johann Pachelbel / William Tell Overture by Gioachino Rossini		
2015	The Age of Swing; It Don't Mean a Thing (If It Ain't Got That Swing) by Duke Ellington & Irving Mills / Stompin' at the Savoy by Edgar Sampson / Sing, Sing, Sing (With a Swing) by Louis Prima		
2016	Elements of Funk; In the Stone by Allee Willis, David Foster, and Maurice White / Fantasy by Maurice White, Verdine White & Eddie del Barrio / Shining Star by Maurice White, Larry Dunn, and Philip Bailey		
2017	Come Together; We Can Work It Out by Lennon–McCartney / Ordinary People by John Legend & Will.i.am / James Brown in the Twilight Zone by Chris Brubeck		
2018	American Struggle; Battle Hymn of the Republic by Julia Ward Howe / Strange Fruit by Abel Meeropol / Stand Up for Something by Common and Diane Warren / Sing, Sing, Sing (With a Swing) by Louis Prima / The Stars and Stripes Forever by John Philip Sousa	63.025	8th Place; Class A
2019	Heart of Steam; Clockwork Heart by Bear McCreary / I Write Sins Not Tragedies by Panic! At the Disco / Curious World by Alice's Night Circus	68.350	4th Place; Class A Finalist
2020	Season canceled due to the COVID-19 pandemic		
2021	Funk Spectacular; I Wish & Superstition by Stevie Wonder / Tell Me Something Good by Rufus / Shining Star by Maurice White, Larry Dunn & Philip Bailey	66.200	4th Place; Class A Finalist
2022	A Mixtape; Pachelbel's Canon by Johann Pachelbel / Symphony No. 7 by Ludwig van Beethoven / Bolero by Maurice Ravel / L'Arlésienne by Georges Bizet	71.675	4th Place; Class A Finalist
2023	Homecoming; Take On Me by A-Ha / Party (Homecoming Live) by Beyoncé Knowles / Best Part by Daniel Ceasar / Thnk fr th Mmrs by Patrick Stump (Fall Out Boy)	72.200	4th Place; Class A Finalist
2024	Lenox Avenue: Midnight; Take the "A" Train by Billy Strayhorn / Shanghai Shuffle by Larry Conley & Gene Rodemich / Stormy Weather by Harold Arlen & Ted Koehler / Harlem Congo by Harry Alexander White	71.500	4th Place; Class A Finalist
2025	Portrait; Intro by Adam Ben Ezra / I Am Nothing by Shubh Saran / La Jeune Fille en Feu by Para One & Arthur Simonini / Babayaga by Philip Lassiter / Original Music by Marco Iannelli & Josh Boulis	69.675	3rd Place; Class A Finalist
2026	Is It Recording? Stare by Alex Somers / Tezeta (Nostalgia) by Mulatu Astatke / What Is Hip? by David Garibaldi & Emilio Castillo / Baltimore by Tokiop Meyers / Stay Volk by Mobley / Alright by Kendrick Lamar / Original Music by Marco Iannelli & Josh Boulis	73.325	14th Place; All-Age

== Gallery ==
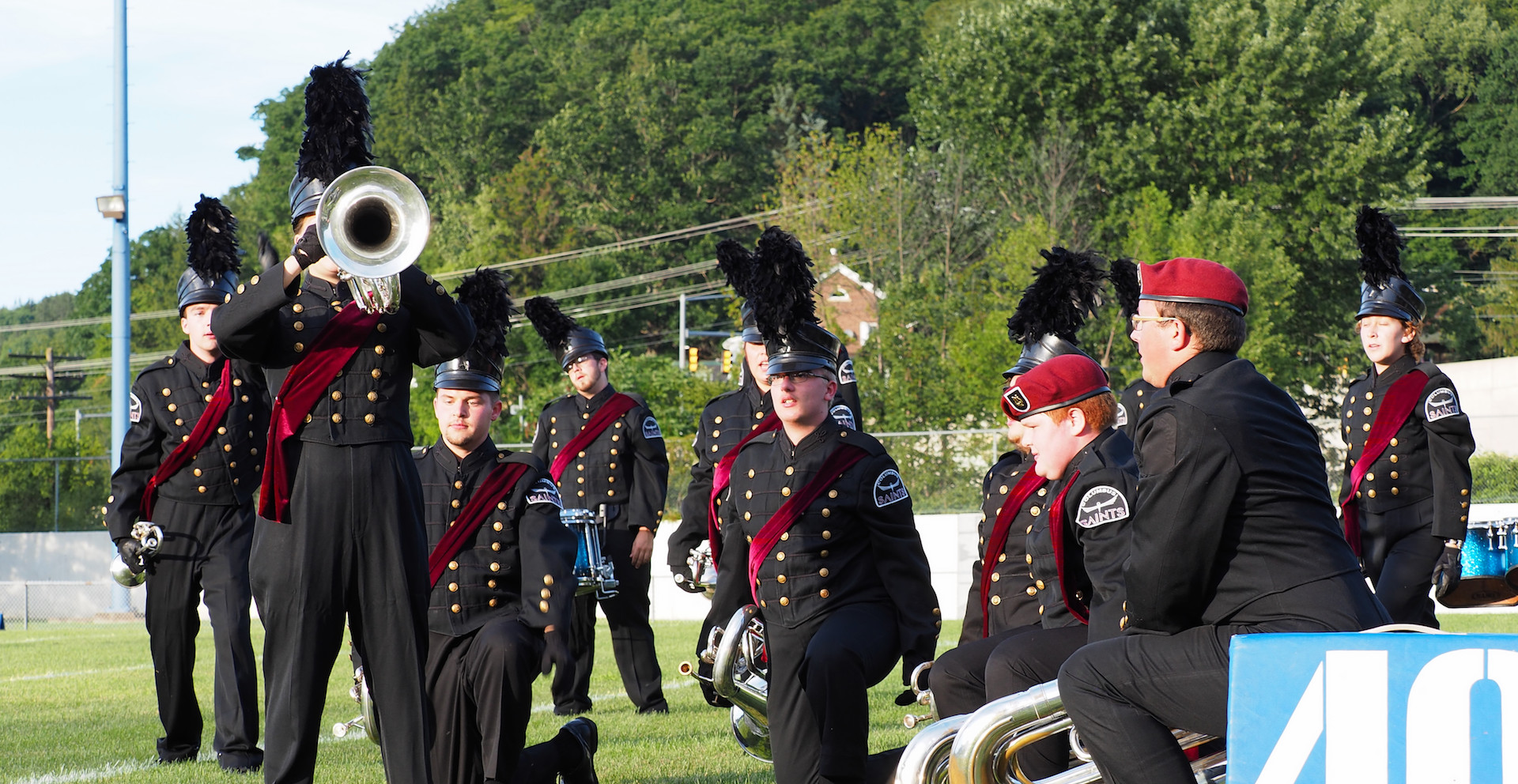
2017 DCI Johnsonburg

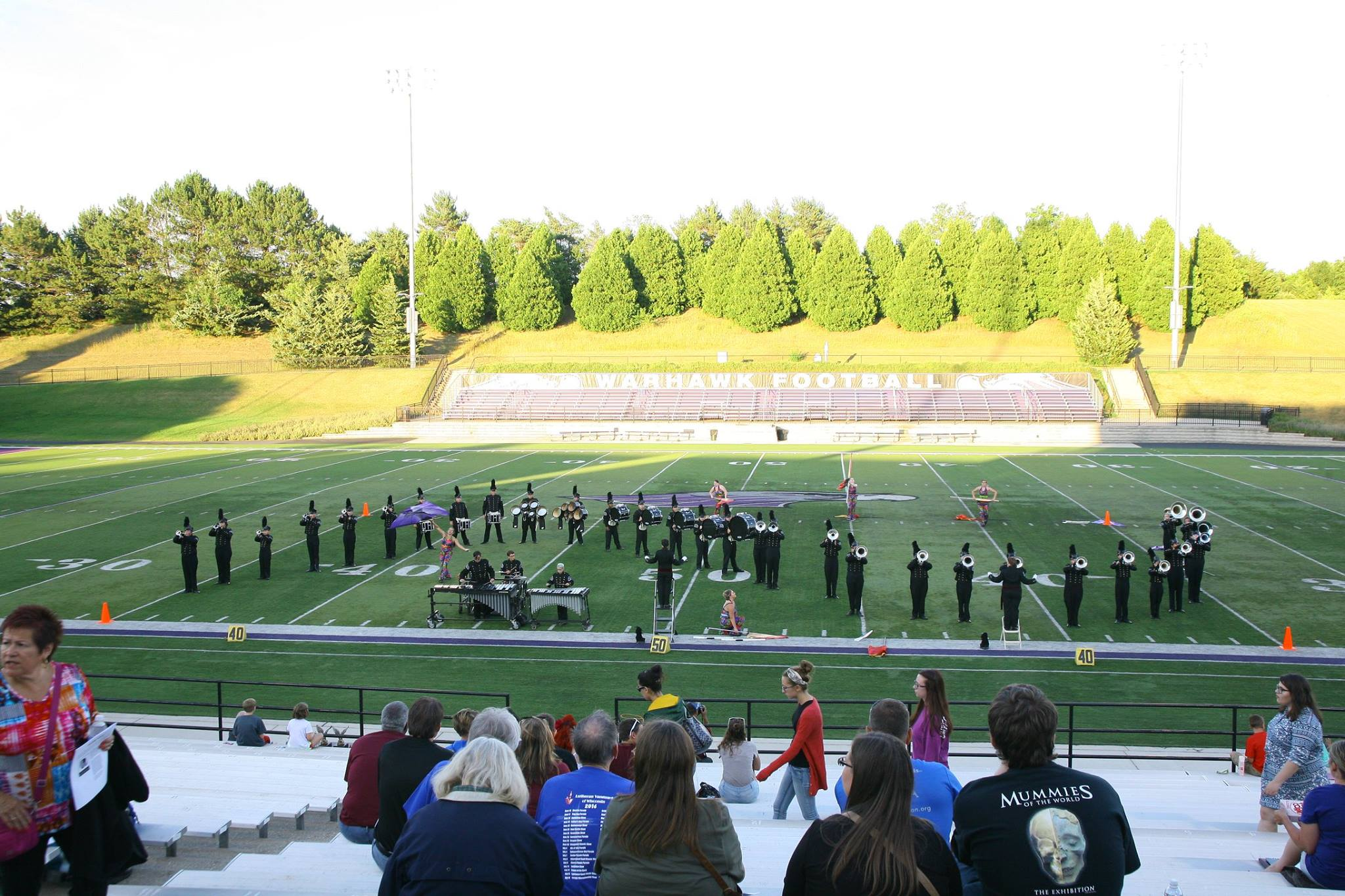
2016 MACBDA

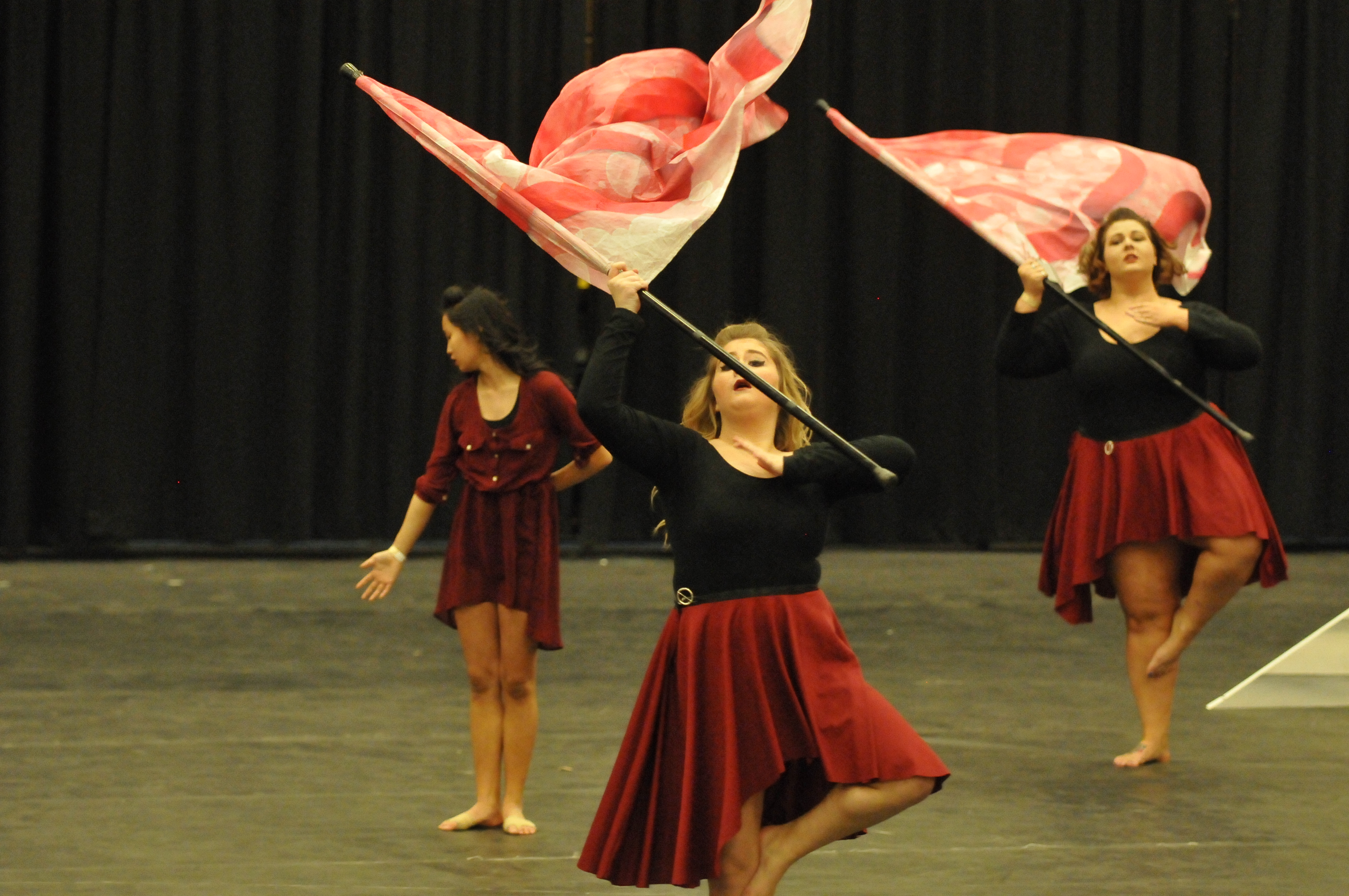
2015 Winter Guard

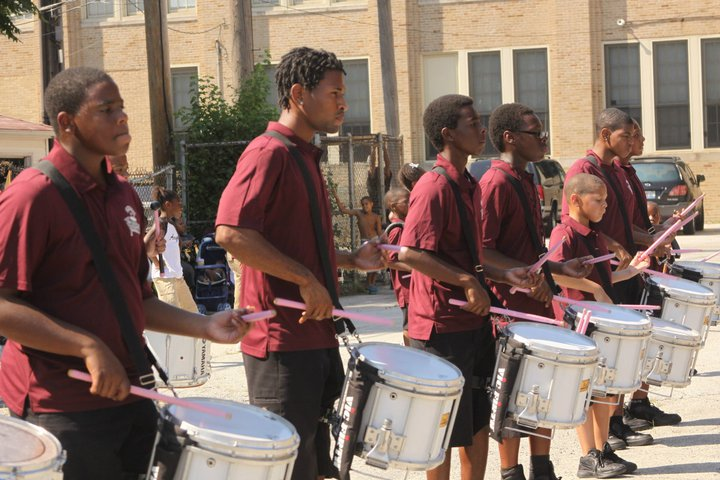
2010 Saints Drumline
