= Peotone High School =

Location
- 605 W. North Street; Peotone, Illinois 60468; United States
- 41.3353°N 87.8023°W

Information
- School type: Public Secondary
- Opened: 2001
- School district: Peotone Community Unit School District 207-U
- Superintendent: Brandon Owens
- Principal: Angela Patrick
- Staff: 35.25 (FTE)
- Grades: 9-12
- Gender: Coed
- Enrollment: 477 (2018–19)
- Average class size: 18.4
- Student to teacher ratio: 13.53
- Campus size: 30 acres
- Area: South Suburbs
- Campus type: suburban
- Colors: Blue and White
- Song: On, You Devils!
- Mascot: Blue Devil
- Newspaper: The Devil's Advocate
- Yearbook: Promethean
- Website: phs.peotoneschools.org

Peotone High School or PHS, is a public four-year high school located in Peotone, in a southern suburb of Chicago, in the United States.

Peotone High School serves students from the south, central and eastern region of Will County, and a small portion of northwestern Kankakee County. This includes Green Garden, Manhattan, Peotone, Rockville, Will and Wilton townships.

== History ==
Peotone Community Unit School District 207-U is one of the longest surviving school districts in Will County. The high school's location has changed twice since 1954, due to overpopulation in the growing community. Construction began on the current Peotone High School in 2000, barely being completed at the start of the school year on August 28, 2001. The current campus of Petone High School serves grades 9-12. Peotone Middle School serves grades 6-8 which is in the old Peotone Junior-Senior High School that served grades 6-12.

== Student demographics and characteristics ==
The current enrollment at Peotone High School is 679. Ethnicity is 89.6% White, 7% Hispanic/Latino and 3.4% all others. 13.8% of students lie within the low income bracket. The attendance rate is 94%, and the graduation rate is 93.2%.

== Academics ==
PHS offers a wide variety of curriculum for its students to choose from. Departments include Agriculture, Business, Family and Consumer Sciences, Industrial Technology, Media and Technology, English, Foreign Language (Spanish is the only Foreign Language offered after the Class of 2009), Fine Arts, Mathematics, Health and Physical Education, Science, and Social Studies. Peotone offers AP courses in US History, English Language and Composition, English Literature and Composition, Chemistry, Biology, Computer Science Principles, and Calculus AB. Peotone also has a Special Education program.

In 2010, 60% of Juniors met or exceeded on the PSAE, 7% higher than the statewide average.

Juniors and Seniors also have the opportunity to attend Kankakee Area Career Center located in Bourbonnais, Illinois. Classes take place for half the school day, and is worth 1.5 credits per semester. Departments include Automotive Technology, Business Technology, Child Development, Collision Repair, Computer Technology, Construction Technology, Cosmetology, Drafting/CAD, Fire/Rescue, Health Occupations, Law Enforcement, Precision Metals and Welding Technology.
