= Sandwich Community Unit School District 430 =

School district in Illinois, USA

Address
- 720 South Wells Street Sandwich, Illinois, 60548; United States
- Coordinates: 41°38′23″N 88°37′09″W

District information
- Type: Public
- Grades: PreK–12
- NCES District ID: 1735370

Students and staff
- Students: 1,844

Other information
- Website: www.sandwich430.org

Sandwich Community Unit School District #430 is a school district headquartered in Sandwich, Illinois, United States.

== History ==
The district started with the community's first school, Herman E. Dummer School, located just north of the current district headquarters on Wells Street in Sandwich. The district grew to accommodate the growth of the community: there are now three elementary schools, a transitional school for kids in 4th and 5th Grade, a junior high school, and a high school. There have been plans to build a new high school to eliminate overcrowding at the current high school for around ten years, with no definitive plans gone ahead with. A picture of Dummer Elementary ended up on the 'Tonight Show with Jay Leno' during its "Headlines" segment, due to the school's unusual name and spelling, which is still displayed on the main entrance of the school.

== IVVC (Indian Valley Vocational Center) ==
The school district also works with the Indian Valley Vocational Center, which serves as a High School level training center for students, which they attend in either the first or second half of the school day, and they return to their home school for the other half. The center serves CUSD 9 (Earlville), CUSD 429 (Hinckley-Big Rock), CUSD 1 (Leland), CUSD 271 (Paw Paw), CUSD 430 (Sandwich), CUSD 432 (Somonauk), CUSD 425 (Indian Creek/Waterman-Shabbona), CUSD 18 (Newark), CUSD 88 (Plano), CUSD 2 (Serena-Sheridan), and CUSD 115 (Yorkville).

== Elementary schools ==
School name	Year opened	Location	Principal	Mascot
W. W. Woodbury Elementary	1961	322 E. 3rd Street	Jennifer Kern	Indians/Braves
Prairie View Elementary	1975	1201 Castle Street	Garrett Ryan	Indians/Braves
Lynn G. Haskin Elementary	1961	720 S. Wells Street	Martha Venetucci	Indians/Braves

== Intermediate school ==
School name	Year opened	Location	Principal	Mascot
Herman E. Dummer Elementary	1901	422 S. Wells Street	Lynette Ford	Braves

== Junior high school ==
School name	Year opened	Location	Principal	Mascot
Sandwich Middle School	2001	600 S. Wells	A. Heilemeier	Braves

== High school ==
School name	Year opened	Location	Principal	Mascot
Sandwich Community High School	1967	515 E. Lions Road	Shane Darnell	Indians
