= The Warren Junior Military Band =

Youth band program

- School: Independent, members represent communities throughout NE Ohio, the Midwest, and other countries
- Founded: 1927
- Members: 60

The Warren Junior Military Band, originally established in Warren, Ohio, is a youth band which is now composed of students from all over the Youngstown-Warren-Boardman, OH-PA Metropolitan Area. Its members, aged 12 to 21 years old, represent schools from all over the Northeastern Ohio region, and other states and foreign countries.

The band, which functions both as a concert band and a marching band, performs in parades and competitions in locations all over the Midwest, and giving exhibition performances in venues all over the world. The band, nicknamed "The Squires" after their long-time former band director Donald W. "Squire" Hurrelbrink, has performed in every major parade in the United States, and on the White House lawn and for several presidents. Its noble and formal military style, which was preserved over the years by Hurrelbrink, is the trademark of the band to this day.

== Band history ==
The Warren Jr. Military Band is a community youth band in the Sousa tradition. Its purpose is music education and enrichment – for members and audiences. But more than that, it is a family – of band members, staff, parents, community volunteers, and alumni.

The band originated in 1927 when St. Mary's School, Elm Rd, Warren discontinued its band program in response to an increasingly depressed economy. Just a block away, the members of the Veterans of Foreign Wars, Warren Post 1090, determined to keep the St. Mary's Band going. Starting with the members of the St. Mary's Band and welcoming students from other schools, the VFW Boys Band was organized by VFW member Colonel Lester Friend, who became the band's first manager, and Raymond Dehnbostel of the Dana School of Music, who became the band's first director.

Donald W. "Squire" Hurrelbrink, a young Dana student, became Band Director in 1930 and directed the band continuously until 1996. He added girls to the band in 1945. Squire died on March 13, 1999. The band's current directors are Carl Snyder and Josh Hawkins. Chris Houser, Lauren Munroe, Tim Tuite, Jason Detec, Holly Ceci, Liz Hawkins, and Sarah Winston are associate staff members. Many of the staff are band alumni, and all have put in many years of service with the band.

In 1957, the band became independent of outside sponsorship and incorporated as the Warren Junior Military Band. Its membership today includes young musicians from all over the Mahoning and Shenango Valleys and communities in southern Ohio, Pennsylvania, and Michigan.

Over the years, the band has amassed an impressive list of regional, national, and international honors and awards from all over the world. Performance tours have taken the band throughout the United States and to Hawaii, Great Britain, and Europe. The band has marched in nearly every major parade in the country, including Macy's Thanksgiving Parade and the Orange Bowl Parade. The concert band has played in city squares from Warren, Ohio, to Brussels, Belgium, and in concert halls from Youngstown, Ohio, to Zurich, Switzerland. It has played in the Palace Courtyard in Salzburg, Austria, and on the White House Lawn. The Warren Jr. Military Band continues today to be in great demand for concert, parade and field show performances throughout the areas in which it travels.

Hurrelbrink served as the director of the band until his death in 1999, a tenure of almost 70 years . In 1972, "Squire" Hurrelbrink was honored as a recipient of the George Washington Award by the Freedoms Foundation at Valley Forge, an award shared by such notables as Walt Disney, Herbert Hoover, and John Glenn.

The band today is very active in the summer marching band competition circuit, and gives many free local performances. Despite the band's name, which is a reference to its military style of marching and discipline, it is not related to any branch of the United States Military.
