= Morris Community High School =

Public school in Illinois, United States

Location
- 1000 Union St. Morris, Illinois; United States; 41.365°N 88.434°W

Information
- Type: Public secondary
- Established: 1944
- School district: MCHSD101
- Principal: Michele Flanagan
- Faculty: 51.83 (FTE)
- Grades: 9–12
- Enrollment: 946 (2022–23)
- Student to teacher ratio: 18.25
- Campus: Suburban
- Colors: Maroon and white
- Mascot: Warriors
- Nickname: Warriors
- Rival: Coal City Coalers
- Yearbook: The Chief
- Website: www.morrishs.org

Morris Community High School, or MCHS, is a public four-year high school located in the Chicago suburb of Morris, Illinois, a city 35 miles (56 km) southwest of Chicago, Illinois, in the United States. It is the school of Morris Community High School District 101.

== History ==
Morris High School can trace its history back to 1872 when classes were held on the second floor of the old Center School building. The high school then moved to its own site on Franklin Street in 1898, with two wings added in 1914. A $1.2 million referendum in 1949 was successfully passed, and shortly thereafter the current building was built. It was added onto again in 1960. It now sits in its current spot on Union Street in Morris.

== Academics ==
In 2020, Morris had an average composite ACT score of 17.0, and graduated 82.6.% of its senior class. The composite ACT score was lowered from Morris's 2005 average of 21.0 due to the covid testing years of 2019–2021. The average class size is 212. Morris has not made Adequate Yearly Progress on the Prairie State Achievement Examination, a state test part of the No Child Left Behind Act.

== Athletics ==
Morris currently competes in the Interstate Eight Conference. Teams are stylized as Morris after discontinuation of the mascot that had been used previous to the start of the 2025-26 school year.

The poms team claims state titles for the last 11 years, totaling 22 titles with the Illinois Dance Team Association. This past year they won titles through IDTA and the IHSA competition. Morris won the state football championship in 1980, 1984, and 2005, but they have been State Runner-up 8 times out of a total of 11 State Championship trips. In a total of making the playoffs 82 times, they've only missed the playoffs 18 times. In 2021 the school board formed an advisory community committee to investigate the use of the Redskin mascot. It was the committee's recommendation to stop use of the current Mascot. In January 2022, the school board voted to change the mascot name. On Monday, February 9, 2026, there was a successful 6 to 1 making the Warriors the official mascot.

== Activities ==
- Baseball
- Basketball
- Bowling
- Cross country
- Color Guard
- Winter Guard
- Concert band
- Cheerleading
- Chorus
- Football
- Golf
- Pom-pon
- Scholastic Bowl
- Soccer
- Softball
- Speech team
- Swimming
- Tennis
- Track and field
- Volleyball
- Wrestling

== Notable alumni ==
- Ed Brady — former NFL football player
- Kelly Dransfeldt — retired Major League Baseball player
- Billy Petrick — Major League Baseball player
- Scott Spiezio — retired Major League Baseball player
- Jimmy Stafford — member of the rock band Train

== See also ==
- Native American mascot controversy
- Sports teams named Redskins
