= Sandwich, Illinois =

- City
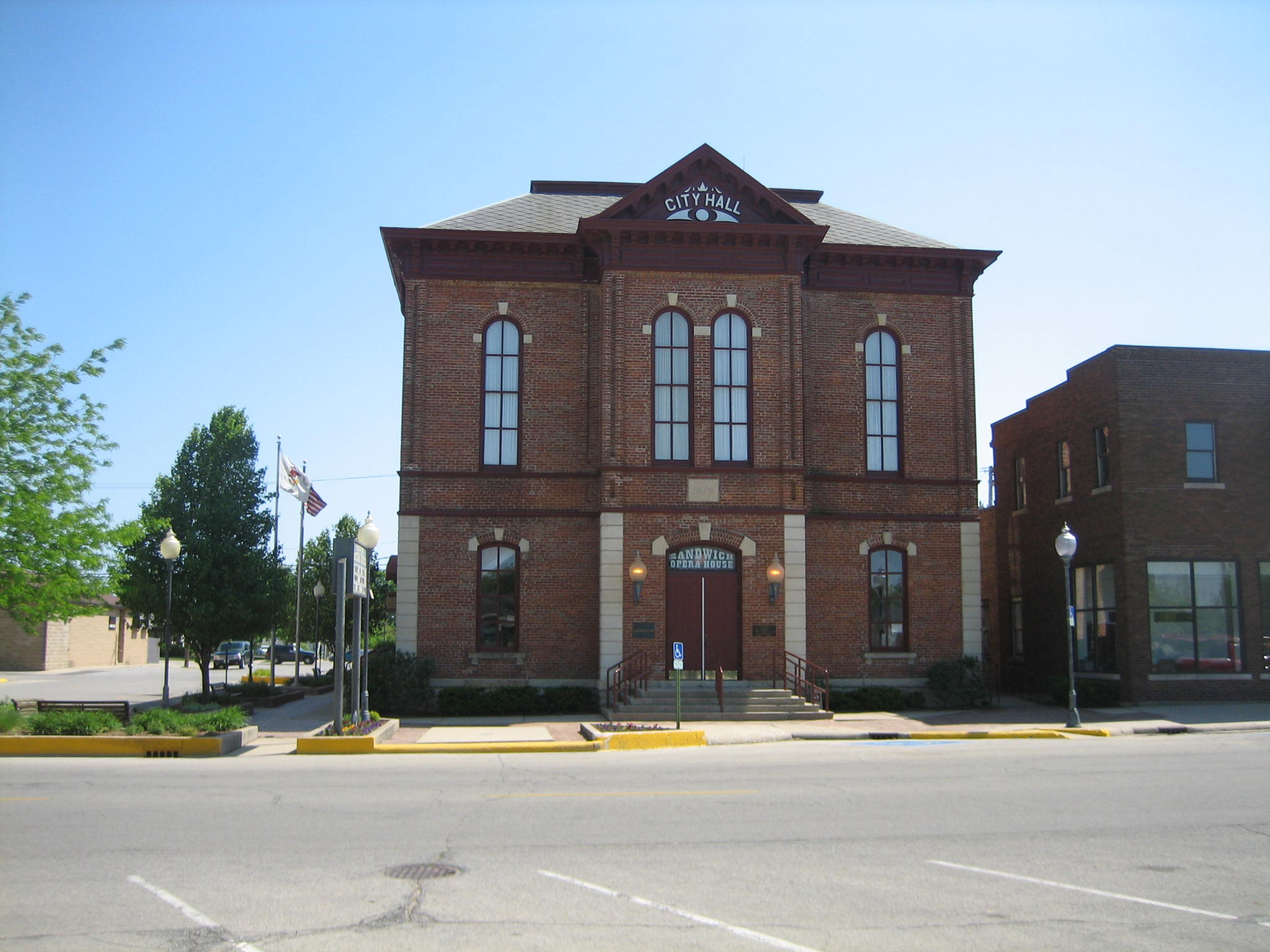
- Sandwich City Hall and Opera House
- Nickname: The Fair City
- Location of Sandwich in DeKalb and Kendall Counties, Illinois.
- Coordinates: 41°38′39″N 88°37′44″W
- Country: United States
- State: Illinois
- Counties: DeKalb, Kendall
- Townships: Sandwich, Somonauk, Little Rock
- Incorporated (city): February 21, 1859
- Founder: Almon Gage

Area
  - Total: 4.75 sq mi (12.31 km^{2})
  - Land: 4.74 sq mi (12.27 km^{2})
  - Water: 0.019 sq mi (0.05 km^{2})
- Elevation: 669 ft (204 m)

Population (2020)
  - Total: 7,221
  - Density: 1,520/sq mi (587/km^{2})
- Time zone: UTC-6 (CST)
  - Summer (DST): UTC-5 (CDT)
- ZIP code: 60548
- Area codes: 815, 779
- FIPS code: 17-67548
- GNIS feature ID: 2396534
- Website: www.sandwich.il.us

Sandwich is a city in DeKalb and Kendall counties in the U.S. state of Illinois. Its population was 7,421 at the 2010 census and 7,221 at the 2020 census.

== History ==
The town's history is tied to politician John Wentworth and his efforts to move the Illinois border with Wisconsin from being even with the southernmost latitude of Lake Michigan to its present location. If those efforts had not been successful, the state line would reside along the LaSalle-DeKalb County border, placing the incorporated community in Wisconsin. The community was established when Almon Gage sought a railroad stop on the Chicago, Burlington and Quincy Railroad that ran through town. Originally naming it Newark Station (not to be confused with the nearby village of Newark) he and Wentworth worked extensively to create the community and also to get the railroad stop created. In honor of his efforts, Wentworth was given the opportunity to name the town. He named it after his home of Sandwich, New Hampshire. The city's Wentworth Apartments and Wentworth Street are named after him.

== Geography ==
As of 2021, Sandwich has a total area of 4.754 square miles (12.31 km^{2}), of which 4.763 square miles (12.34 km^{2}) (or 99.62%) is land and 0.018 square miles (0.05 km^{2}) (or 0.38%) is water.

Within the city limit of Sandwich, there is a network of creeks, which either connect to Somonauk Creek (Lake Holiday), Little Rock Creek, or to the Fox River. Lake Davis, which stretched from Veterans Memorial Park to what is now Gletty Road, was drained early in the 19th century to open up additional farmland. The Sandwich town site was built on a natural gradation due to a geological fault line known as the Sandwich Fault, so the city stands on a hillside. The southeast corner of the city is the lowest spot, roughly near the Harvey Creek Preserve, as well as near Little Rock Creek. The last earthquake along the Sandwich Fault was on July 15, 2024.

=== Climate ===
Sandwich's climate is typified by large seasonal temperature variances, with warm to hot (and often humid) summers and cold (sometimes severely cold) winters. The Köppen Climate Classification subtype for this climate is "Dfa". (Hot Summer Continental Climate).

== Demographics ==
Historical population
Census	Pop.	Note	%±
1860	952		—
1870	1,844		93.7%
1880	2,352		27.5%
1890	2,516		7.0%
1900	2,520		0.2%
1910	2,557		1.5%
1920	2,409		−5.8%
1930	2,611		8.4%
1940	2,608		−0.1%
1950	3,027		16.1%
1960	3,842		26.9%
1970	5,056		31.6%
1980	5,356		5.9%
1990	5,567		3.9%
2000	6,509		16.9%
2010	7,421		14.0%
2020	7,221		−2.7%
U.S. Decennial Census

=== Racial and ethnic composition ===
Sandwich city, Illinois – Racial and ethnic composition Note: the US Census treats Hispanic/Latino as an ethnic category. This table excludes Latinos from the racial categories and assigns them to a separate category. Hispanics/Latinos may be of any race.
Race / Ethnicity (NH = Non-Hispanic)	Pop 2000	Pop 2010	Pop 2020	% 2000	% 2010	% 2020
White alone (NH)	5,877	6,301	5,799	90.29%	84.91%	80.31%
Black or African American alone (NH)	15	28	58	0.23%	0.38%	0.80%
Native American or Alaska Native alone (NH)	15	10	3	0.23%	0.13%	0.04%
Asian alone (NH)	16	56	53	0.25%	0.75%	0.73%
Native Hawaiian or Pacific Islander alone (NH)	4	0	1	0.06%	0.00%	0.01%
Other race alone (NH)	1	5	16	0.02%	0.07%	0.22%
Mixed race or Multiracial (NH)	36	86	224	0.55%	1.16%	3.10%
Hispanic or Latino (any race)	545	935	1,067	8.37%	12.60%	14.78%
Total	6,509	7,421	7,221	100.00%	100.00%	100.00%

=== 2020 census ===
As of the 2020 census, Sandwich had a population of 7,221. The median age was 39.8 years. 22.7% of residents were under the age of 18 and 18.1% of residents were 65 years of age or older. For every 100 females there were 98.3 males, and for every 100 females age 18 and over there were 93.4 males age 18 and over.

97.8% of residents lived in urban areas, while 2.2% lived in rural areas.

There were 2,761 households in Sandwich, of which 31.2% had children under the age of 18 living in them. Of all households, 49.3% were married-couple households, 18.0% were households with a male householder and no spouse or partner present, and 25.0% were households with a female householder and no spouse or partner present. About 27.7% of all households were made up of individuals and 12.7% had someone living alone who was 65 years of age or older.

There were 2,891 housing units, of which 4.5% were vacant. The homeowner vacancy rate was 1.3% and the rental vacancy rate was 3.3%.

Racial composition as of the 2020 census
Race	Number	Percent
White	6,052	83.8%
Black or African American	76	1.1%
American Indian and Alaska Native	36	0.5%
Asian	53	0.7%
Native Hawaiian and Other Pacific Islander	1	0.0%
Some other race	471	6.5%
Two or more races	532	7.4%

=== Income and poverty ===
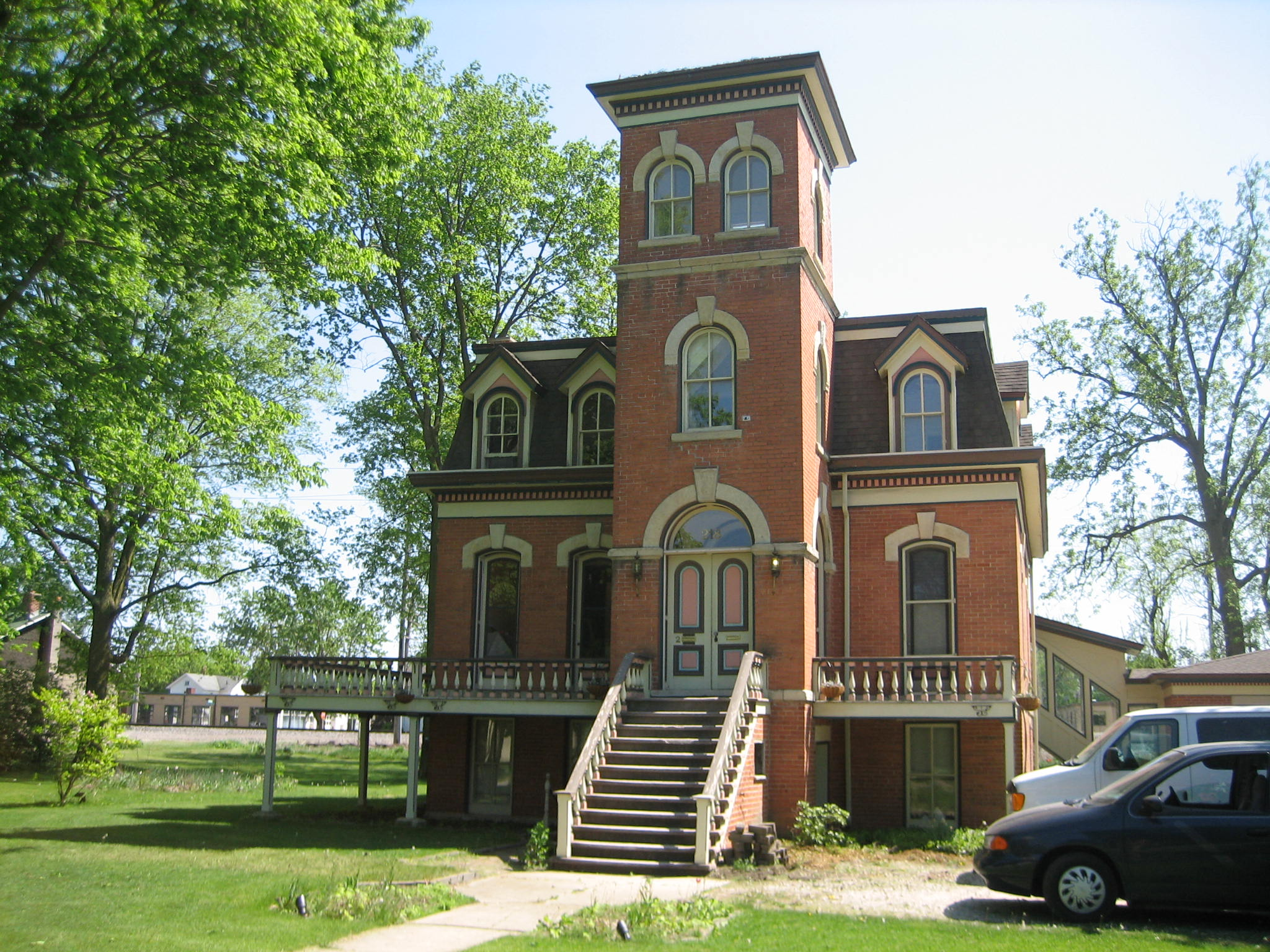
Von KleinSmid Mansion

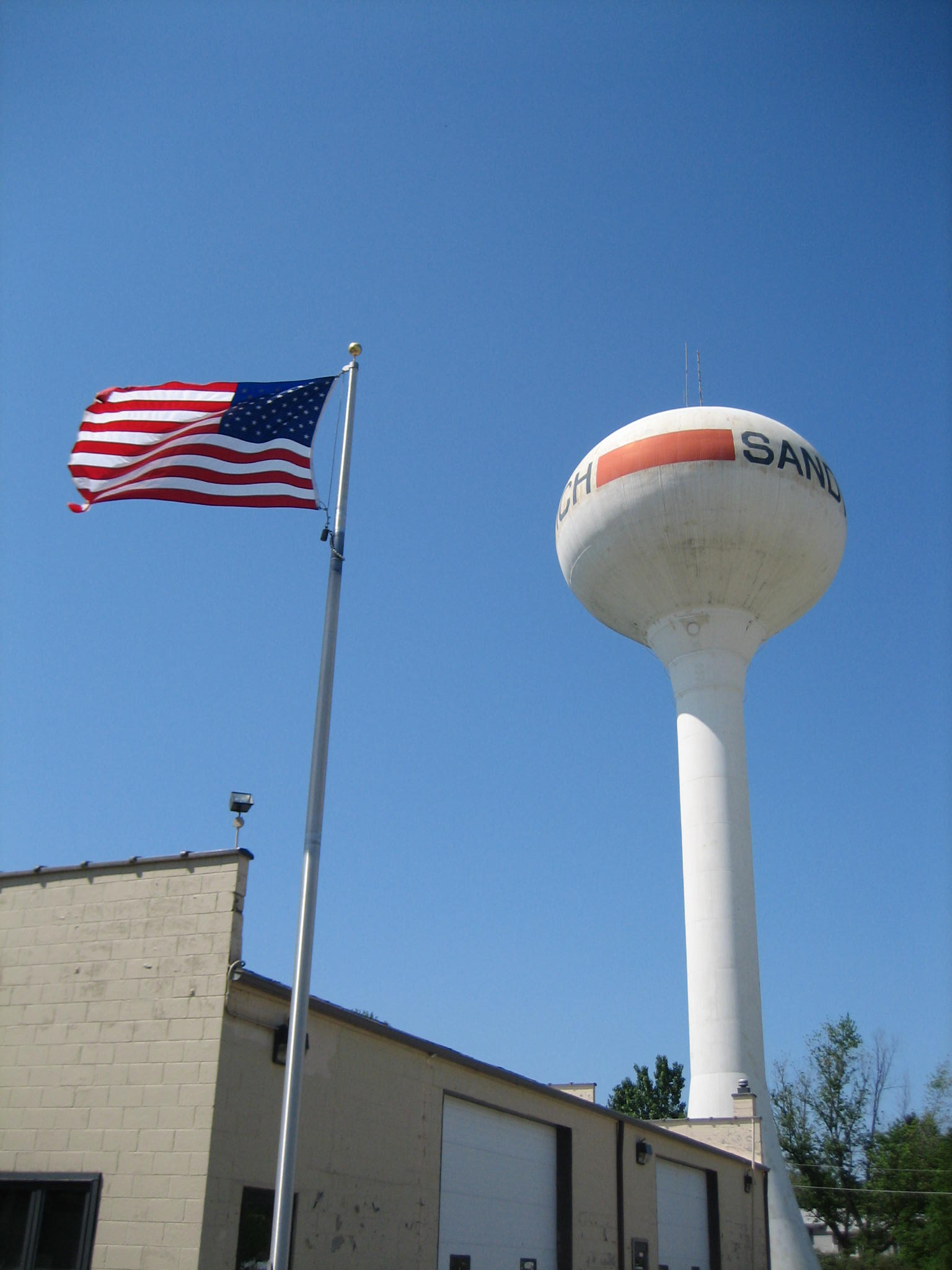
Water tower

The median income for a household in the city was $70,563, and the median income for a family was $76,452. Males had a median income of $46,429 versus $26,841 for females. The per capita income for the city was $29,619. About 5.3% of families and 7.7% of the population were below the poverty line, including 8.9% of those under age 18 and 2.2% of those age 65 or over.

== Economy ==
Businesses in Sandwich include:

- Sahara-Pak heat-of-compression air dryer, in 1974.
- Designed Stairs, manufacturer, designer and builder of custom hardwood luxury stairs moved to Sandwich in 1983.
- Meadowvale, a dairy mix manufacturer that specializes in ice cream, frozen custard, and soft serve mixes that are distributed across the US.

== Arts and culture ==
The Sandwich Fair is an annual event founded in 1858 as a DeKalb County livestock show. It is one of the oldest continuing county fairs in Illinois, drawing daily crowds of more than 100,000, with top attendance days reaching over 200,000.

== Education ==
The community is served by Sandwich Community Unit School District 430, which operates three elementary schools, an intermediate school, a junior high, and a high school. The schools are: Prairie View Elementary, Lynn G. Haskin Elementary, W.W. Woodbury Elementary, Herman E. Dummer School, Sandwich Middle School, and Sandwich Community High School.

== Notable people ==
- Hugh Brannum (1910–1987), actor, who played the role of "Mr. Green Jeans" on Captain Kangaroo
- Lyell Carr (1857–1912), artist
- Latham Castle (1900–1986), judge and Illinois Attorney General
- Garrett Gilkey (1990-), NFL offensive guard, attended school in Sandwich, native of Lemont
- Paul Harvey (1882–1955), film and TV actor
- Rufus B. von KleinSmid (1875–1964), President of the University of Southern California
