= National Register of Historic Places listings in Kendall County, Illinois =

Location of Kendall County in Illinois

This is a list of the National Register of Historic Places listings in Kendall County, Illinois.

This is intended to be a complete list of the properties and districts on the National Register of Historic Places in Kendall County, Illinois, United States. Latitude and longitude coordinates are provided for many National Register properties and districts; these locations may be seen together in a map.

There are 11 properties and districts listed on the National Register in the county.

This National Park Service list is complete through NPS recent listings posted May 22, 2026.

== Current listings ==
	Name on the Register	Image	Date listed	Location	City or town	Description
1	Bristol Congregational Church	Bristol Congregational Church	September 6, 2016 (#16000580)	107 W. Center St. 41°38′51″N 88°26′50″W	Yorkville	Aka the Chapel on the Green
2	Chicago, Burlington & Quincy Railroad Depot	Chicago, Burlington & Quincy Railroad Depot	November 12, 1993 (#93001238)	101 W. Main St. 41°39′44″N 88°32′17″W	Plano	
3	Downtown Oswego Historic District	Downtown Oswego Historic District	August 15, 2022 (#100007995)	Roughly bounded by one-half blk. north of Jackson St., the alleys immediately west and east of Main St., and one-half block south of Washington St. 41°41′02″N 88°21′08″W	Oswego	
4	Evelyn Site		December 19, 1978 (#78001159)	Midway between Newark and Lisbon Center Rds., east of Big Grove Rd. 41°31′49″N 88°30′26″W	Newark	
5	Farnsworth House	Farnsworth House	October 7, 2004 (#04000867)	14520 River Rd. 41°38′15″N 88°32′07″W	Plano	
6	Kendall County Courthouse	Kendall County Courthouse	November 12, 1998 (#98001354)	109 W. Ridge St. 41°38′25″N 88°26′53″W	Yorkville	
7	Plano Hotel	Plano Hotel	November 12, 1993 (#93001239)	120 W. Main St. 41°39′44″N 88°32′21″W	Plano	
8	Reorganized Church of Jesus Christ of Latter Day Saints	Reorganized Church of Jesus Christ of Latter Day Saints	November 2, 1990 (#90001724)	304 S. Center Ave. 41°39′33″N 88°32′09″W	Plano	
9	Albert H. Sears House	Albert H. Sears House	January 29, 1987 (#86003720)	603 E. North St. 41°39′55″N 88°31′49″W	Plano	
10	Lewis Steward House	Lewis Steward House	November 28, 2003 (#03001200)	611 E. Main St. 41°39′54″N 88°31′47″W	Plano	
11	Yorkville School	Yorkville School	January 24, 1995 (#94001600)	201 W. Center St. 41°38′52″N 88°26′53″W	Yorkville	

== See also ==
- List of National Historic Landmarks in Illinois
- National Register of Historic Places listings in Illinois
