= 1876 Illinois gubernatorial election =

- November 6, 1876
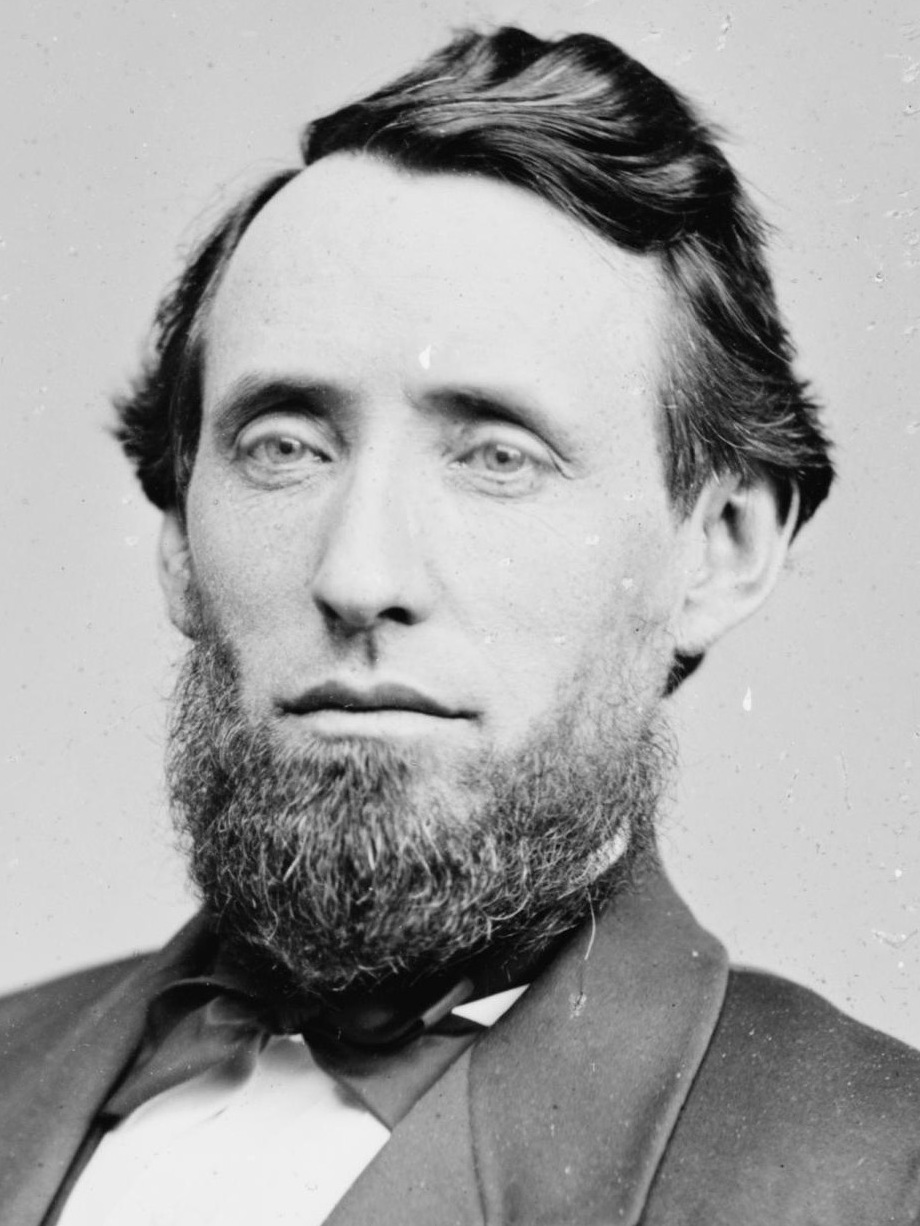

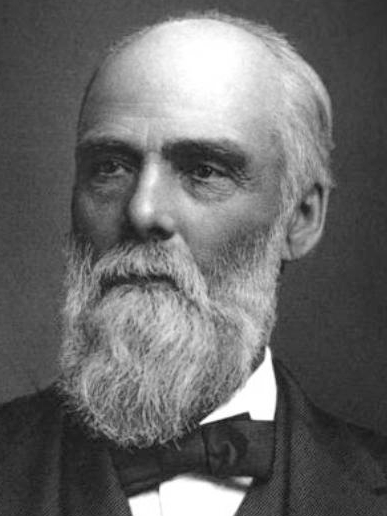
Nominee	Shelby M. Cullom	Lewis Steward
Party	Republican	Democratic
Popular vote	279,263	272,465
Percentage	50.58%	49.35%
- County results Cullom: 50–60% 60–70% 70–80% 80–90% Steward: 50–60% 60–70% 70–80%
Governor before election
John Lourie Beveridge
Republican
Elected Governor
Shelby Moore Cullom
Republican

The 1876 Illinois gubernatorial election was held on November 6, 1876. Republican U.S. representative Shelby M. Cullom narrowly defeated Democratic businessman Lewis Steward. This was sixth consecutive victory for the Republican Party since 1856, when William Henry Bissell narrowly won with a plurality of the vote, but the narrowest victory within that frame. Cullom slightly overperformed Republican candidate Rutherford B. Hayes in the concurrent presidential election.

== General election ==
=== Candidates ===
- Samuel B. Allen (Independent; write-in)
- Shelby M. Cullom, state representative, former speaker of the Illinois House, and former U.S. representative from Springfield (Republican)
- James F. Simpson (Prohibition)
- Lewis Steward, Plano businessman and founder of Marsh, Steward & Company (Democratic)

=== Results ===
1876 gubernatorial election, Illinois
Party	Candidate	Votes	%	±%
Republican	Shelby Moore Cullom	279,263	50.58%	−3.83%
Democratic	Lewis Steward	272,465	49.35%	N/A%
Write-in	Samuel B. Allen	184	0.03%	N/A
Prohibition	James F. Simpson	181	0.03%	N/A
Majority		6,798	1.23%	−8.08%
Turnout		552,093		
Republican hold		Swing		

== See also ==
- 1876 Illinois lieutenant gubernatorial election
