= Sears House =

Sears House may refer to:

- Sears Catalog Home, ready-to-assemble kit houses sold by Sears, Roebuck and Company
- Sears House (Austin, Arkansas), listed on the NRHP in Arkansas
- Dean L. C. Sears House, Searcy, listed on the NRHP in Arkansas
- Sears-Kay Ruin, Carefree, listed on the NRHP in Arizona
- A. B. Sears House, Chesterville, listed on the NRHP in Ohio
- Albert H. Sears House, Plano, listed on the NRHP in Illinois
- David Sears House, Boston, listed on the NRHP in Massachusetts
- Sears–Ferris House, Carson City, listed on the NRHP in Nevada
- Rev. Henry M. and Jennie Sears House, Austin, listed on the NRHP in Texas
- Sears House (Staunton, Virginia), listed on the NRHP in Virginia
