= Robert A. Childs =

American politician

Robert Andrew Childs
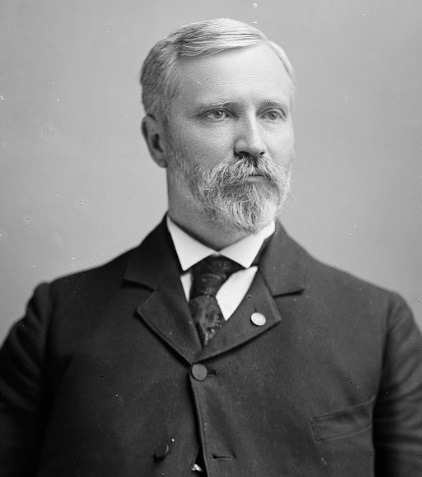
- C. M. Bell Studio Collection, Library of Congress

Member of the U.S. House of Representatives from Illinois's 8th district
- In office March 4, 1893 – March 3, 1895
- Preceded by: Lewis Steward
- Succeeded by: Albert J. Hopkins

Personal details
- Born: March 22, 1845 Malone, New York, U.S.
- Died: December 19, 1915 (aged 70) Hinsdale, Illinois, U.S.
- Education: Illinois State Normal University, 1870

Robert Andrew Childs (March 22, 1845 – December 19, 1915) was a U.S. Representative from Illinois.

Born in Malone, New York, Childs moved to Illinois with his parents, who settled near Belvidere, Boone County, in 1852. He attended the common schools. During the Civil War, he was enlisted in General Stephen A. Hurlbut's company, which subsequently became a part of the 15th Illinois Volunteer Infantry Regiment, and served throughout the war. He graduated from the Illinois State Normal University in 1870. He was the principal and superintendent of the public schools in Amboy 1871–1873. He studied law and was admitted to the bar in 1872, and commenced practice in Belvidere, Illinois. He settled in Hinsdale, a suburb of Chicago, in July 1873. He served as the member of the village board of trustees and the president of the school board.

Childs was elected as a Republican to the Fifty-third Congress (March 4, 1893 – March 3, 1895). He was not a candidate for renomination in 1894. He resumed the practice of law in Chicago. He died in Hinsdale, Illinois, December 19, 1915. He was interred in Bronswood Cemetery.

The Robert A. and Mary Childs House was added to the National Register of Historic Places in 2000.

U.S. House of Representatives
Preceded by Lewis Steward	Member of the U.S. House of Representatives from Illinois's 8th congressional district March 4, 1893 – March 3, 1895	Succeeded by Albert J. Hopkins
