= Northeastern Athletic Conference (disambiguation) =

The North Eastern Athletic Conference, now the United East Conference, is an intercollegiate athletic conference affiliated with the NCAA's Division III.

Northeastern Athletic Conference may also refer to:

- Northeastern Athletic Conference (Illinois), a high school conference
- Northeastern Athletic Conference (OHSAA), a high school conference in Ohio
