= W. W. Marsh =

Canadian-American inventor and businessman

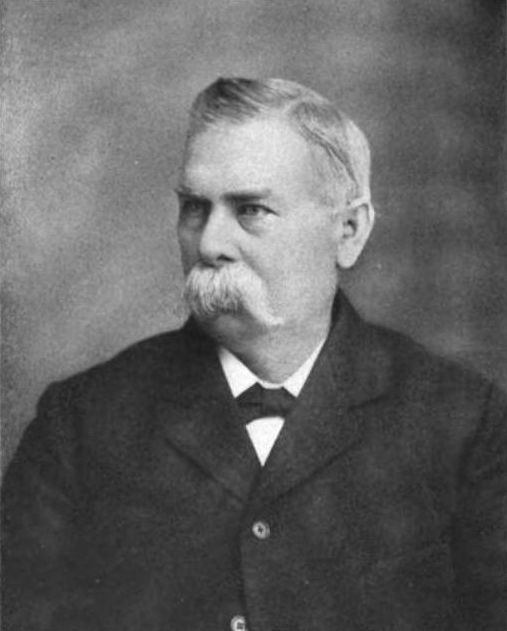

William Wallace Marsh (April 15, 1835 – May 12, 1918) was a Canadian American inventor and businessman who co-founded Marsh, Steward & Company with his brother Charles. Born in Ontario, Canada, Marsh developed an early harvester prototype on the family farm in DeKalb County, Illinois, United States. With help from businessman Lewis Steward, Marsh, Steward & Company became an early leader in harvester production. The company later merged with others to form International Harvester. Marsh lived in Sycamore, Illinois from 1873 until his death, serving as a longtime alderman.

== Biography ==
William Wallace Marsh was born near Trenton, Lower Canada on April 15, 1835 to Samuel and Tamar Marsh. Samuel Marsh was a Patriote in the Rebellions of 1837, captured and jailed for five months. Samuel became a follower of Millerism and left his family to await the predicted Second Coming. W. W. Marsh moved with his mother to Cobourg when he was eight and attended St. Andrews School. Two years later he enrolled at Victoria College, where he studied for three years. In 1849, after Samuel returned to the family, they decided to move to a 110-acre (45 ha) farm in Clinton Township, DeKalb County, Illinois near Shabbona Grove.

The farm proved difficult for the family to manage. In 1857, William Wallace Marsh began to experiment with grain bundling methods. Marsh discovered he could bind grain while another was being cut if the cutting apparatus could move. His brother, Charles W., joined the effort the next day. For the next few years, the brothers worked together to perfect their harvester. In 1859, the Marsh brothers unveiled the completed product during a reaping contest north of DeKalb. The success of the Marsh's design was owed to the fact that anyone could use the implement—during demonstration, the Marshes had young girls and hoboes operate the machine with ease. The Marsh design was deemed the most effective reaper, and the brothers set to manufacture the product.

Woodcut of an early Marsh Brothers harvester

Marsh Brothers was founded in 1858. William Marsh was the inventor of the company while his brother Charles handled the financial aspects. Marsh's inventions were responsible for thirty-five approved patents, expanding the company line with products such as corn huskers, wire stretchers, and plows. The first company factory was opened in Plano, where they met prominent settler Lewis Steward, who invested in the company. Originally capable of producing 100 harvesters in a year, Steward's capital allowed the company to expand to 10,000 per year. The produced their goods essentially unrivaled until 1871.

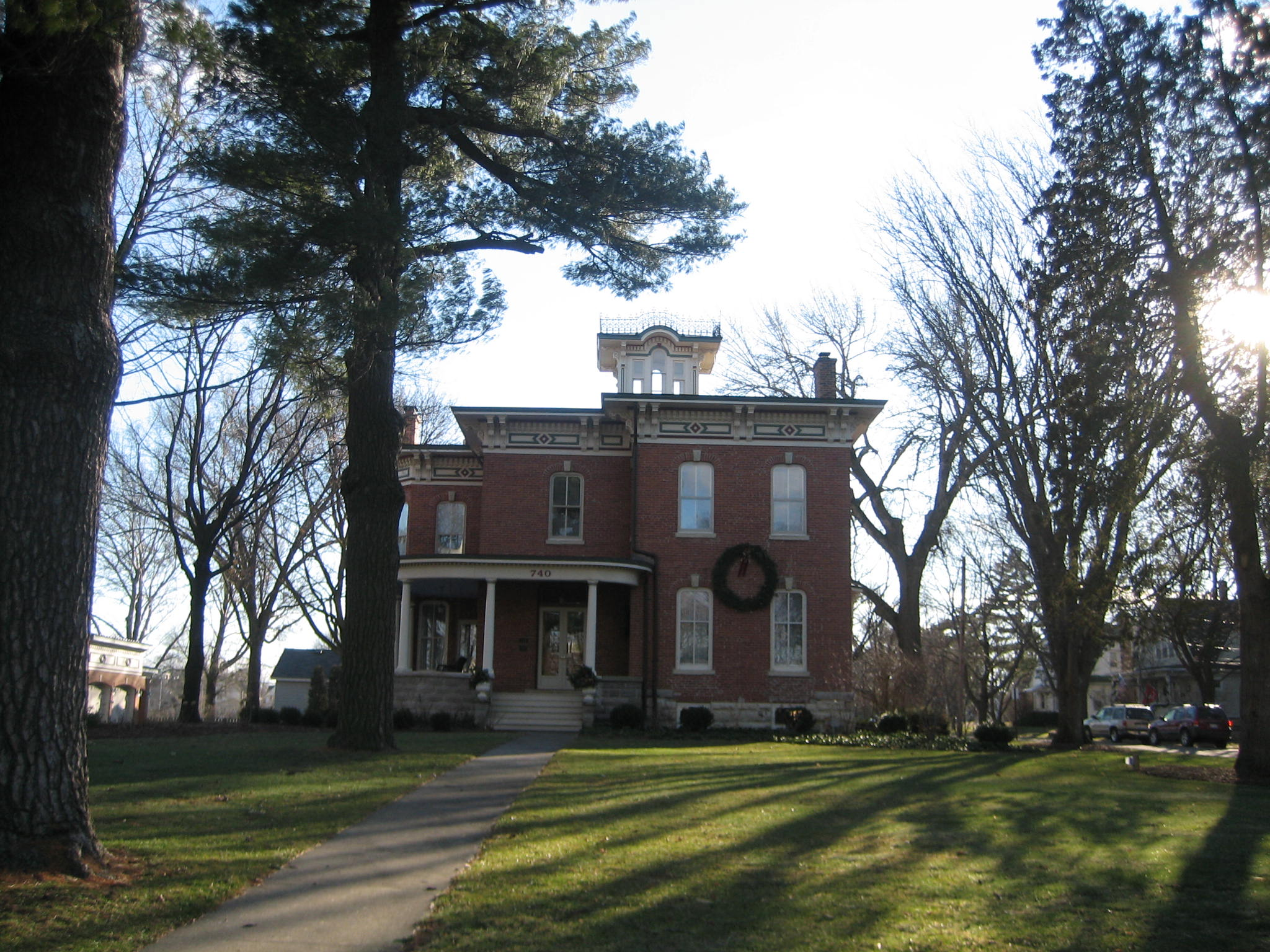
Marsh's house in Sycamore, Illinois

Marsh married M. J. Smith on January 8, 1871. Marsh, Steward & Company moved to Sycamore in 1873. Marsh was elected alderman of Sycamore that year, a position he held for decades. Two years later, William Deering purchased the company and moved most of its operations to North Chicago. It merged with the McCormick Harvesting Machine Company in 1902 to form International Harvester.

Marsh operated the Sycamore division until his retirement in 1906. He died there on May 12, 1918. His 1873 house in Sycamore was listed on the National Register of Historic Places by the National Park Service on December 22, 1978.
