= Robert A. and Mary Childs House =

Historic house in Illinois, United States

- U.S. National Register of Historic Places
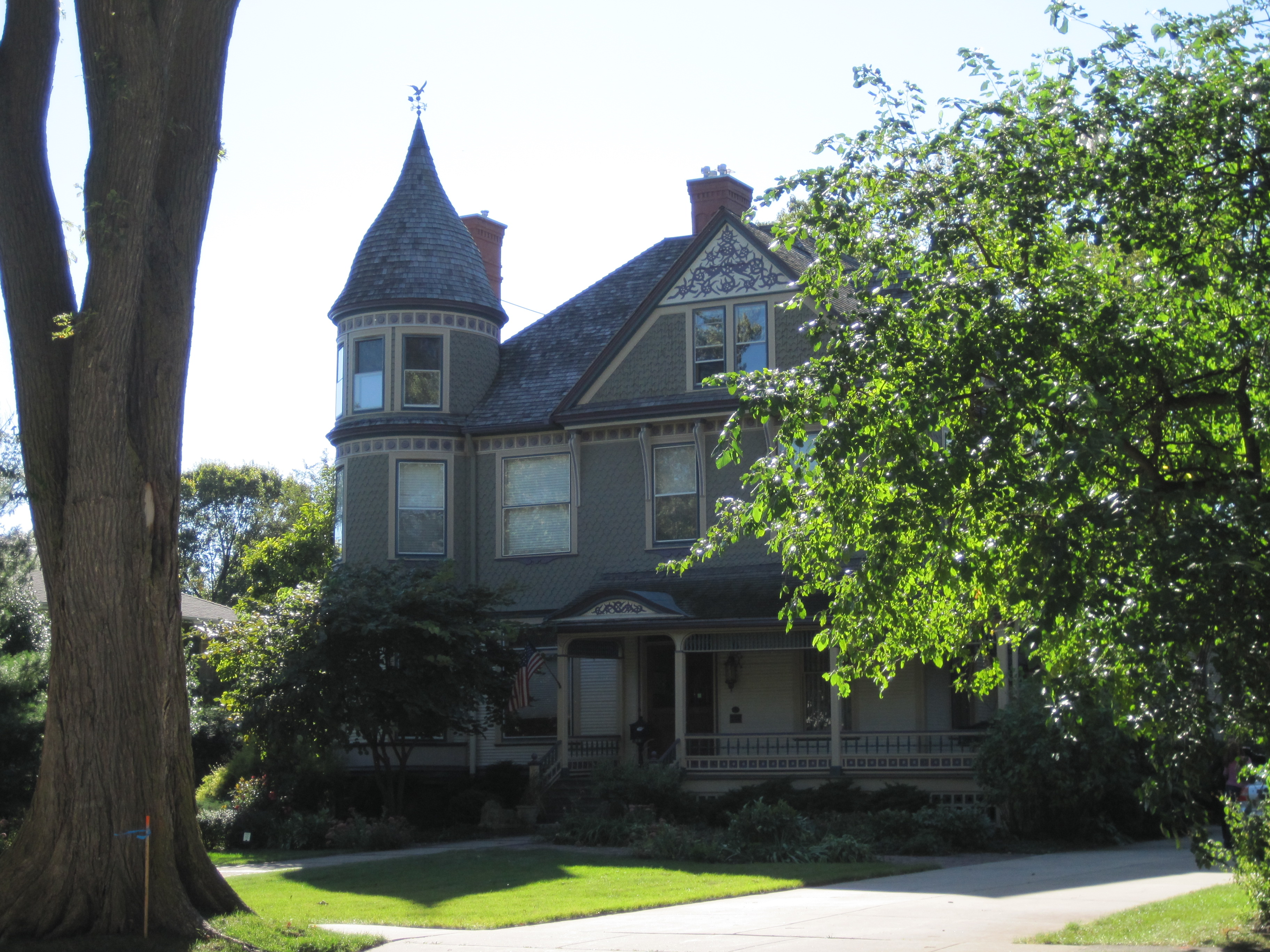

- Location within Illinois Location within the United States
- Location: 318 S. Garfield Ave. Hinsdale, DuPage County, Illinois, U.S.
- Coordinates: 41°47′56″N 87°55′40″W
- Built: 1888
- Architectural style: Queen Anne Style
- NRHP reference No.: 00000476
- Added to NRHP: May 11, 2000

The Robert A. and Mary Childs House is a historic Queen Anne style residence in Hinsdale, Illinois, originally owned by Robert A. Childs.

== History ==
The Childs family moved to Hinsdale 1873, the year of its incorporation. Mary purchased a lot of land in 1881 for a new property. Civil War veteran (15th Illinois Volunteer Infantry Regiment) Robert A. Childs was an attorney who graduated from Illinois State Normal University, passing the bar in 1873. Robert Childs was the president of the Hinsdale School Board from 1879 to 1894, and was a founder of Hinsdale Trust & Savings Bank. He was elected to the United States House of Representatives as a Republican in 1893 and served one term. In total, Robert Childs practiced law for 42 years. Mary founded the Hinsdale Library Association in 1886 and served as its director for 15 years.

The Childs commissioned the building in 1888 to avoid a 600% property tax hike on undeveloped property. They raised five children in the house until 1919. The house was awarded a Historic Preservation Award from the Hinsdale Historical Society in 1994 and was added to the National Register of Historic Places in 2000.

== Architecture ==
The house is on an 86-by-175-foot (26 m × 53 m) lot on Garfield Avenue, one of Hinsdale's main residential streets. It neighbors a 1900 house designed by George Washington Maher. The 2 1/2-story house is approximately 43 by 65 feet (13 m × 20 m). It features many details typical of Queen Anne architecture, including a steeply pitched roof, a corner tower, large gabled dormers, and a wrap-around porch. The east elevation is the main facade.
