= Lewis Steward House =

Historic house in Illinois, United States

- U.S. National Register of Historic Places
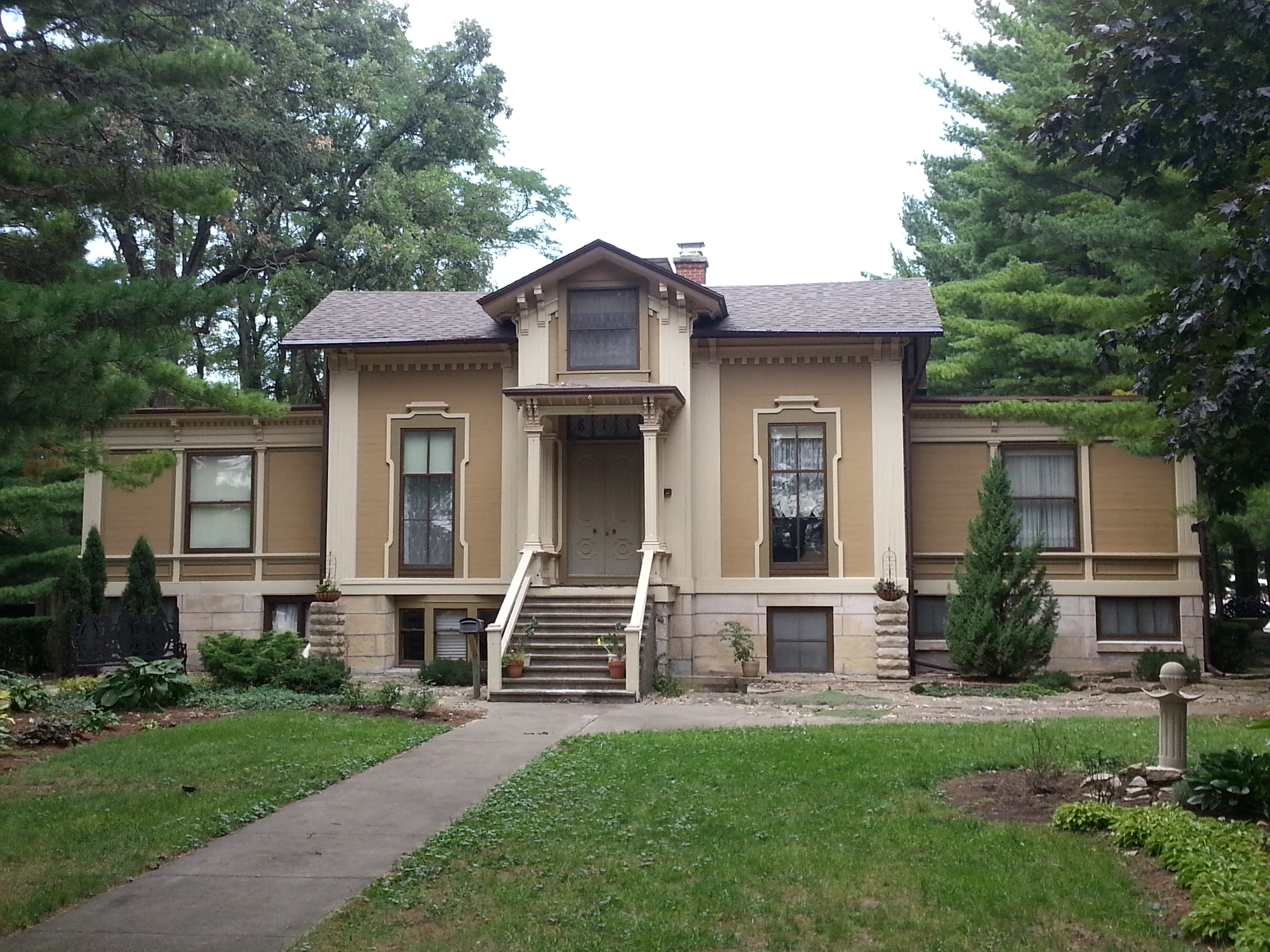

- Location within Illinois Location within the United States
- Location: 611 E. Main St., Plano, Illinois
- Coordinates: 41.66486°N 88.5299°W
- Area: 2 acres (0.81 ha)
- Built: 1854
- Architectural style: Italianate
- NRHP reference No.: 03001200
- Added to NRHP: November 28, 2003

The Lewis Steward House is a historic residence in Plano, Illinois. It was the home of Lewis Steward, a prominent early settler to Kendall County who co-founded Marsh, Steward & Company, ran for the governorship of Illinois, and was elected to the United States House of Representatives.

== History ==
Lewis Steward was born in Wayne County, Pennsylvania. He came with his family to Kendall County, Illinois as a child. Steward helped his father with his farm and eventually moved out to start a farm of his own. In 1862, he joined C. W. and W. W. Marsh to form Marsh, Steward & Company, where they developed a harvester. The company was later purchased by William Deering and was merged to create International Harvester. Steward stayed in Plano after selling his portion. He ran for Governor of Illinois in 1876. Steward started a tannery and shoe factory in Plano. He ran for a seat on the United States House of Representatives in 1890 and served one term. He ran unsuccessfully for the same seat in the next two elections. Steward died on August 27, 1896.

== Architecture ==
The Steward homestead was built in 1854, shortly after Steward was able to convince the Chicago, Burlington & Quincy Railroad to build a station in town. The property is now 2 acres (0.81 ha) at the western corner of East Main and North East Streets. The one-story wood-frame house is generally of Italianate design, built on a coursed stone foundation. The east and west wings were added c. 1875 and have a foundation of brick, finished to appear like the original foundation. The house has a tall raised basement, known as the garden level. The main entrance is flanked with window bays. The entrance has a small porch with a gable roof and two chamfered posts. The concrete steps leading to the porch are modern, although the wood railings and newels are original. A three light transom is over the door, trimmed with heavy moldings. A projecting gable roof appears over the porch, with a one-over-one double-hung window underneath. The basement level has several garden windows. In 2012, the property was purchased by Chet and Mary Kay Sergo. The Sergo's opened the property as The Homestead 1854 thehomestead1854.com a historic wedding, team building and retreat venue.
