= Philip C. Hayes =

American politician (1833–1916)

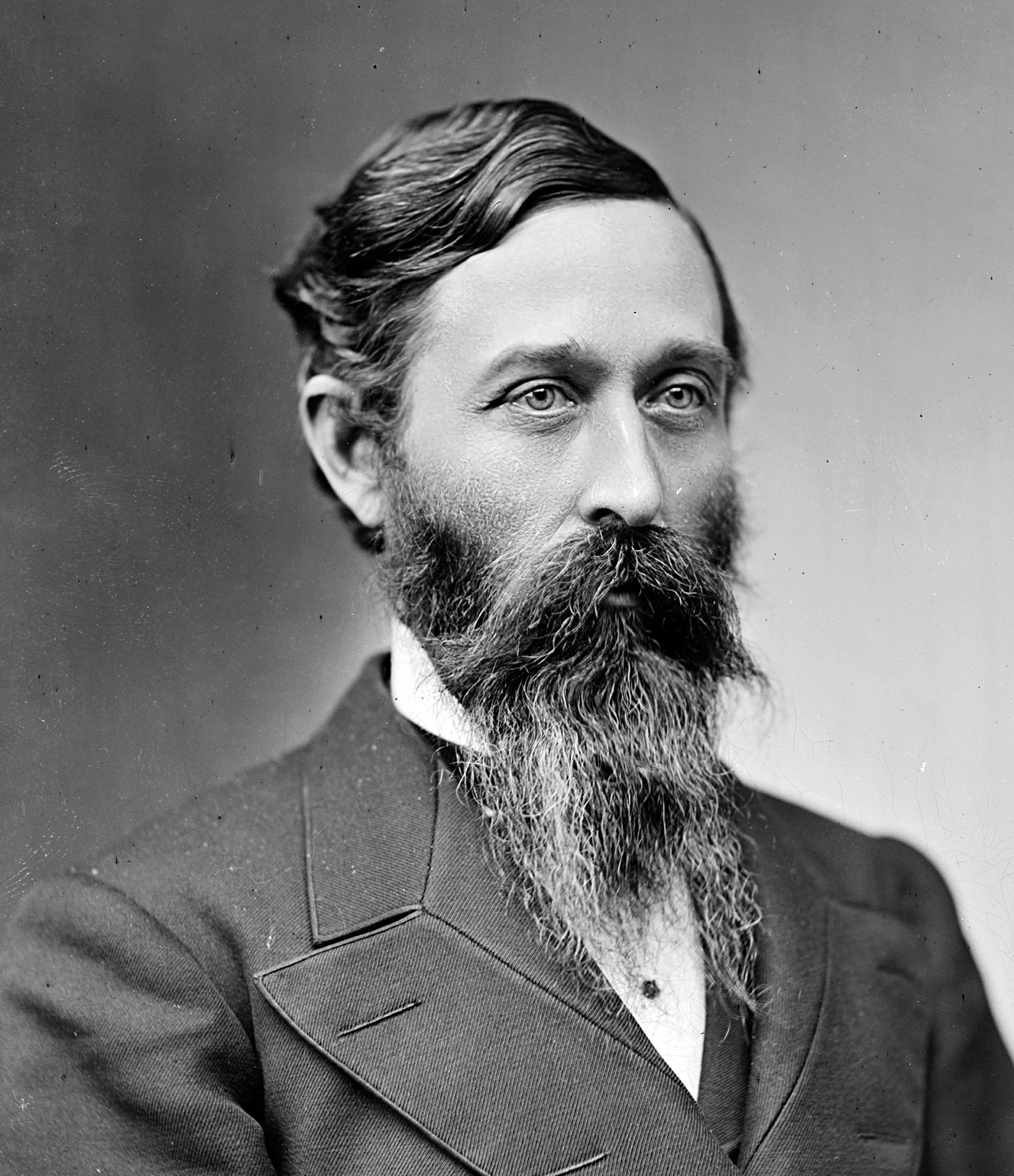
- Born: Philip Cornelius Hayes; February 3, 1833; Granby, Connecticut, U.S.
- Died: July 13, 1916 (aged 83); Joliet, Illinois, U.S.
- Burial place: Elmhurst Cemetery, Joliet, Illinois
- Military career
- Allegiance: United States of America; Union
- Branch: United States Army; Union Army
- Rank: Lieutenant Colonel; Brevet Brigadier General
- Unit: 103rd Ohio Infantry
- Conflicts: American Civil War

Philip Cornelius Hayes (February 3, 1833 – July 13, 1916) was an American politician who served as the U.S. representative from Illinois, as well as an officer in the Union Army during the American Civil War.

== Background ==
Born in Granby, Connecticut, Hayes moved with his father's family to LaSalle County, Illinois. He attended the country schools and graduated from Oberlin (Ohio) College in 1860 and from the Theological Seminary, Oberlin, Ohio, in 1863.

== Military career ==
He enlisted in the Union Army during the Civil War and was commissioned as a captain in the 103rd Ohio Infantry on July 16, 1862. He was promoted to lieutenant colonel on November 18, 1864. On December 3, 1867, President Andrew Johnson nominated Hayes for appointment to the grade of brevet brigadier general of volunteers, to rank from March 13, 1865, and the United States Senate confirmed the appointment on February 14, 1868.

== Public office and politics ==
Following the war, Hayes returned to Ohio. He became the superintendent of schools in Mount Vernon, Ohio, in 1866. He moved to Circleville, Ohio, in 1867, and then to Bryan, Ohio, in 1869.

In 1874, Hayes moved from Ohio to Morris, Illinois. He served as delegate to the Republican National Convention in 1872. Hayes was elected as a Republican to the 45th United States Congress in 1876, unseating independent incumbent Alexander Campbell, a theoretician of the Greenback movement; and was re-elected to the Forty-sixth Congress in 1878. He was not a candidate for renomination in 1880.

He moved to Joliet, Illinois, in 1892, where he resumed journalism. Philip C. Hayes died in Joliet on July 13, 1916, and was interred in Elmhurst Cemetery.

== See also ==
- List of American Civil War brevet generals (Union)

== Notes ==
U.S. House of Representatives
Preceded by William Cullen	Member of the U.S. House of Representatives from Illinois's 7th congressional district 1877-1881	Succeeded by Thomas J. Henderson
