= Eduardo Lucero =

Eduardo Lucero is a Mexican fashion designer based in Los Angeles, California.

== Early life and education ==
Lucero was born in the Mexican state of Durango, and moved to Plano, Illinois at the age of seven.

At age 17, after graduating from Plano High School, Lucero moved to what would become his permanent home, Los Angeles, California, where he pursued his passion for art and fashion. He attended the Otis/Parsons School of Design (now called Otis College of Art and Design) where he learned and developed high-level skills such as fashion design and sketching. Lucero graduated in 1989 and over the next few years worked in many different creative fields such as graphic design, fashion photography, fashion illustration, and costume design for film and television.

== Career ==
Since 1993, Eduardo Lucero has been producing fashion shows/events that promote his clothing line's vision.

In 1994, Lucero launched his fashion career with the launch of a big womenswear collection.

In 1997, Lucero's achievements landed him the downtown Los Angeles California Mart's Rising Star Award, which many in the industry see as the benchmark for the West Coast's most promising designers.

His broad collection consists of 60 to 75 complete outfits per season, including suits, contemporary dresses, sportswear, and evening wear. The price range varies from $100 to over $3000 for elaborately hand-beaded couture gowns.

Over the years, Lucero has presented his collections at the Los Angeles Fashion Week, Mercedes-Benz Fashion Week, GenArt Chicago, and at the Asia Pacific Young Fashion Designers Show in Hong Kong.
