= William Cullen (Illinois politician) =

American politician

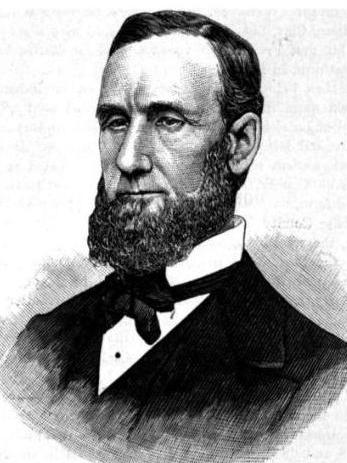

Member of the U.S. House of Representatives from Illinois
- In office March 4, 1881 – March 3, 1885
- Preceded by: Philip C. Hayes (7th); Lewis E. Payson (8th)
- Succeeded by: Thomas J. Henderson (7th); Ralph Plumb (8th)
- Constituency: 7th district (1881-83); 8th district (1883-85)

Personal details
- Born: March 4, 1826 County Donegal, Ireland
- Died: January 17, 1914 (aged 87) Ottawa, Illinois, U.S.
- Party: Republican

William Cullen (March 4, 1826 – January 17, 1914) was a U.S. representative from Illinois.

Born in County Donegal, Ireland, Cullen immigrated to the United States in 1832 with his parents, who settled in Pittsburgh, Pennsylvania, where he attended the public schools and the Allegheny Academy. He later relocated to Adams Township, LaSalle County, Illinois, in 1846 and engaged in agricultural pursuits. Sheriff of LaSalle County, Illinois (1864–65). He moved to Ottawa, Illinois, in 1865, and worked as the political editor of the Ottawa Republican 1871-1887. Cullen was elected as a Republican to the Forty-seventh and Forty-eighth Congresses (March 4, 1881 – March 3, 1885).

Cullen was an unsuccessful candidate for renomination in 1884. He lived in retirement in Ottawa, Illinois, until his death there January 17, 1914. He was interred in Ottawa Avenue Cemetery.

U.S. House of Representatives
Preceded by Philip C. Hayes	Member of the U.S. House of Representatives from Illinois's 7th congressional district 1881-1883	Succeeded by Thomas J. Henderson
Preceded by Lewis E. Payson	Member of the U.S. House of Representatives from Illinois's 8th congressional district 1883-1885	Succeeded by Ralph Plumb
