= Charles A. Hill (politician) =

American politician

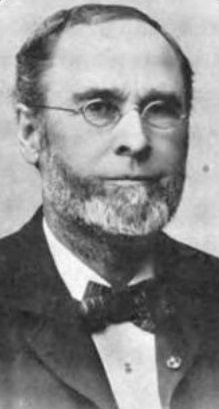
- From Volume 2 (1912) of Memorials of Deceased Companions of the Commandery of the State of Illinois

Member of the U.S. House of Representatives from Illinois's 8th district
- In office March 4, 1889 – March 3, 1891
- Preceded by: Ralph Plumb
- Succeeded by: Lewis Steward

Personal details
- Born: August 23, 1833 Truxton, New York, U.S.
- Died: May 29, 1902 (aged 68) Joliet, Illinois, U.S.
- Party: Republican

Charles Augustus Hill (August 23, 1833 – May 29, 1902) was a U.S. representative from Illinois.

Born in Truxton, New York, Hill attended the common schools and a select school at Griffins Mills. He taught school in Hamburg, New York, and Will County, Illinois. He attended Bell's Commercial College, Chicago, in 1856. He studied law and was admitted to the bar in Indianapolis, Indiana. He returned to Will County, Illinois, in 1860 and practiced law.

On November 5, 1860, Charles was married to Lydia Melissa Wood, who was born March 11, 1839, in Crete, Illinois. They raised 7 children.

During the Civil War, he enlisted in Company F, Eighth Regiment, Illinois Volunteer Cavalry, in August 1862. He was appointed first lieutenant in the First Regiment, United States Colored Troops. In 1865, he was commissioned captain of Company C of that regiment. He returned to Will County, Illinois, in 1865 and resumed the practice of law in Joliet. Hill was elected prosecuting attorney in 1868 for the counties of Will and Grundy and served four years.

Hill was elected as a Republican to the Fifty-first Congress (March 4, 1889 – March 3, 1891). He was an unsuccessful candidate for reelection in 1890 to the Fifty-second Congress. He resumed the practice of law in Joliet, Illinois. He served as assistant attorney general of Illinois from 1897 to 1900. He died in Joliet, Illinois, on May 29, 1902. He was interred in Oakwood Cemetery.

U.S. House of Representatives
Preceded by Ralph Plumb	Member of the U.S. House of Representatives from Illinois's 8th congressional district 1889-1891	Succeeded by Lewis Steward
