= Red Brick Store =

Building in Illinois constructed and owned by Joseph Smith

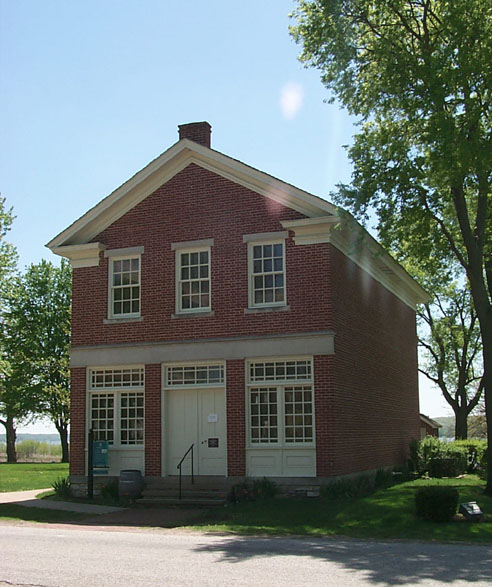
- Red Brick Store rebuilt by the Community of Christ in Nauvoo, Illinois
- Interactive map of the Red Brick Store area

General information
- Type: Commercial, assembly, offices
- Architectural style: Federal
- Location: Nauvoo, Illinois, 865 Water Street
- Coordinates: 40°32′26.5″N 91°23′35.4″W
- Named for: Interior oxblood paint
- Year built: 1841
- Opened: January 5, 1842
- Closed: April 26, 1847 (last entry in account book)
- Demolished: late 1890s
- Owner: The Church of Jesus Christ of Latter-day Saints

Height
- Height: 32 feet

Website
- www.redbrickstore.com (Community of Christ)), www.churchofjesuschrist.org/learn/locations/red-brick-store?lang=eng (Church of Jesus Christ of Latter-day Saints)

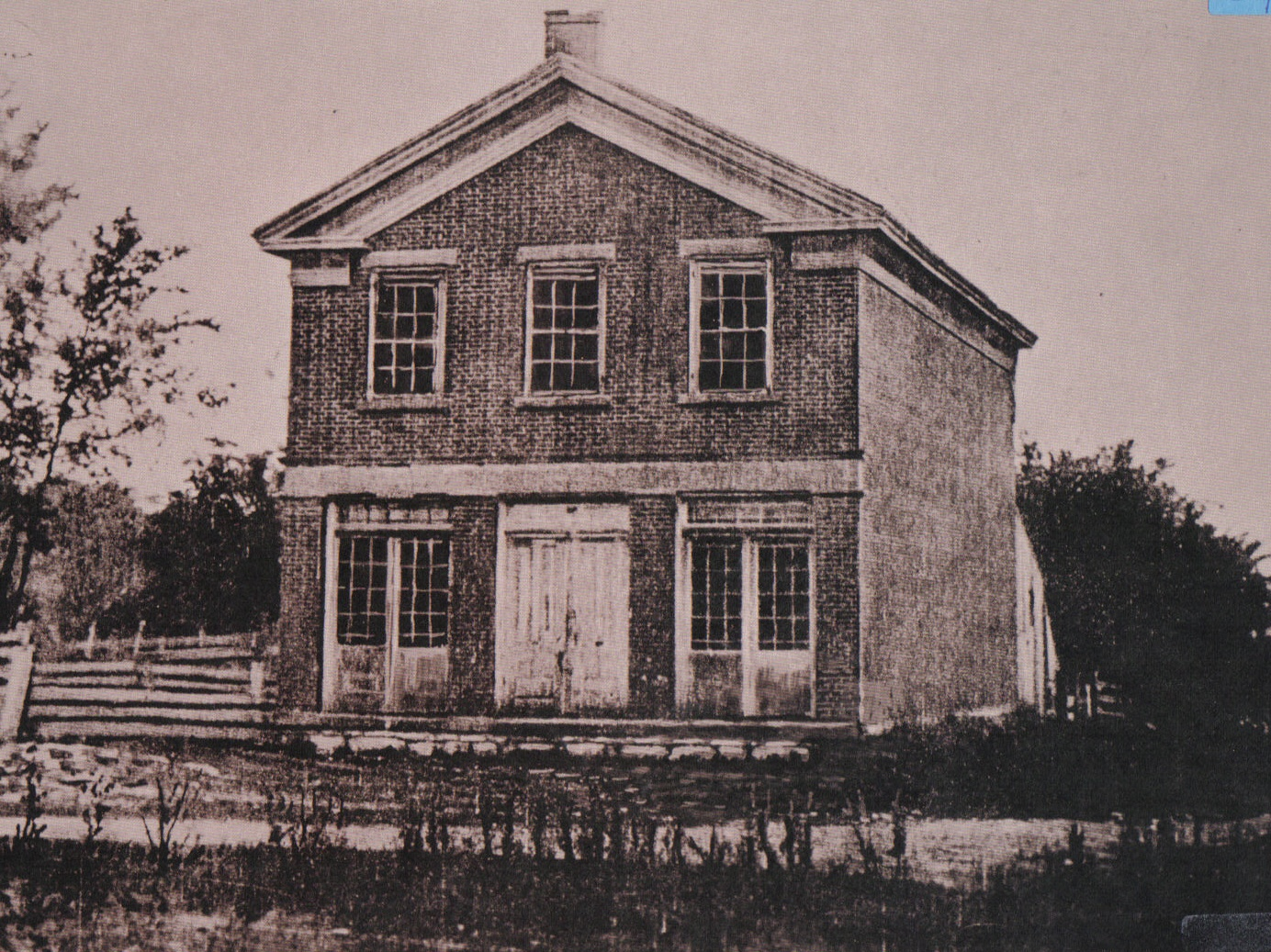
Red Brick Store in the 1880s.

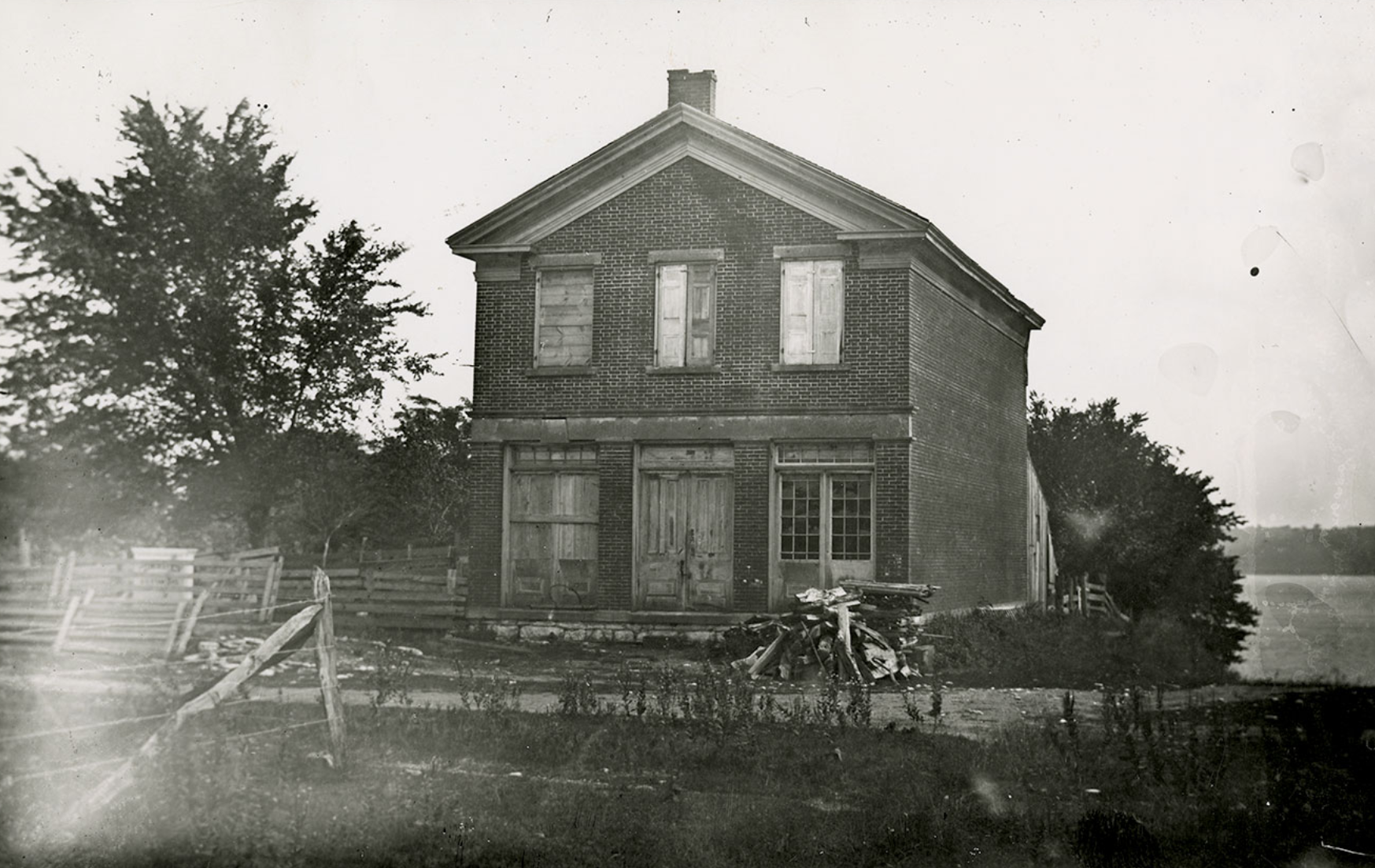
Red Brick Store a few days later.

The Red Brick Store in Nauvoo, Illinois, was a building constructed and owned by Joseph Smith, founder of the Latter Day Saint movement.

== Original building ==
Smith constructed the Red Brick Store in 1841. The building became a center of economic, political, religious, and social activity among the Latter Day Saints. In addition to being a mercantile store, the second floor of the building was also for a period of time the headquarters of the Church of Jesus Christ of Latter Day Saints. Members would visit the store to pay their tithing and other offerings to the church. Before the Nauvoo Masonic lodge was dedicated in 1843, the upper chamber of the Red Brick Store was used and referred to at times as the "Masonic Hall."

=== Notable events ===
On March 15, 1842 Joseph Smith initiated as a Mason and the next day raised to the level of Master Mason in his office in the store. The organization of the Female Relief Society of Nauvoo, the first iteration of the longest-existing women's organization in the world, was founded in the assembly hall on the second floor on March 17, 1842. A few months later the first performance of the Nauvoo Endowment ordinance took place in the same hall on May 4, 1842. In May 1842, Joseph Smith proposed polygamous marriage to 19-year-old Nancy Rigdon behind the locked door of his office on the upper story of the store. Nancy refused, saying she would "alarm the neighbors" if not allowed to leave. Joseph unlocked the door, and his scribe, Willard Richards, delivered the Happiness Letter to Nancy shortly after, in an attempt to convince her to agree to the marriage.

== Destruction and rebuilding ==
After Joseph Smith was killed and the majority of Latter Day Saints left Nauvoo, the Red Brick Store fell into disrepair. Eventually, it was torn down and the bricks were used to construct new buildings in Nauvoo.

In 1980, the Reorganized Church of Jesus Christ of Latter Day Saints (now known as Community of Christ) rebuilt the Red Brick Store on the original foundation as part of its 1980 sesquicentennial celebrations. The reconstructed Red Brick Store is now owned and operated by the Church of Jesus Christ of Latter-day Saints, which purchased the structure on March 5, 2024, as part of a larger sale of historically significant artifacts and properties by the Community of Christ.

== Namesakes ==
In Manti, Utah, the headquarters of the True and Living Church of Jesus Christ of Saints of the Last Days was formerly located in a building named the Red Brick Store in honor of Smith's original structure in Nauvoo.

== See also ==
- Council House (Salt Lake City)
- Endowment House
- Anointed Quorum
- Plano Stone Church
