= Ralph Plumb =

American politician

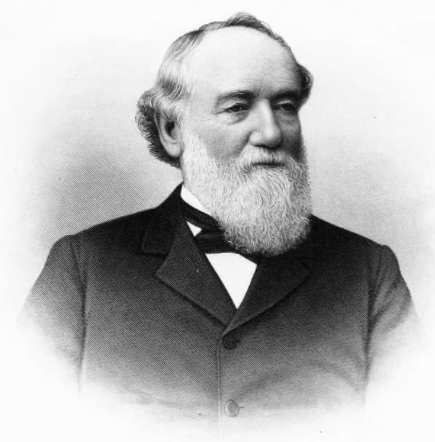

Member of the U.S. House of Representatives from Illinois's 8th district
- In office March 4, 1885 – March 3, 1889
- Preceded by: William Cullen
- Succeeded by: Charles A. Hill

Personal details
- Born: March 29, 1816 Busti, New York, U.S.
- Died: April 8, 1903 (aged 87) Streator, Illinois, U.S.
- Party: Republican
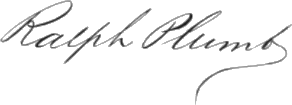
- Signature

Ralph Plumb (March 29, 1816 – April 8, 1903) was a U.S. representative from Illinois.

== Biography ==
Ralph Plumb was born in Busti, New York on March 29, 1816. He attended the common schools. He engaged in mercantile pursuits and moved to Ohio. He served as a member of the Ohio State House of Representatives in 1855. Deciding to study law, he was admitted to the bar in 1857 and commenced practice in Oberlin, Ohio. During the Civil War served in the Union Army as captain and quartermaster of Volunteers, 1861–65. He was brevetted lieutenant colonel.

He moved to Illinois in 1866 and settled in Streator. He engaged in the mining of coal and the building of railroads. He served as mayor of Streator from 1882 to 1885, and was later elected as a Republican to the Forty-ninth and Fiftieth Congresses (March 4, 1885 – March 3, 1889). Plumb engaged in banking until his death in Streator on April 8, 1903.

U.S. House of Representatives
Preceded by William Cullen	Member of the U.S. House of Representatives from Illinois's 8th congressional district 1885-1889	Succeeded by Charles A. Hill
