= Westminster Christian School (Elgin, Illinois) =

School in Elgin, Illinois, United States

Location
- 2700 W Highland Ave; Elgin, Illinois; 42.050378°N 88.344261°W

Information
- Religious affiliation: Christian
- Enrollment: 330 (2019)
- Website: www.westminsterchristian.org

Westminster Christian School is a private Christian school in Elgin, Illinois.

Westminster Christian School had 330 students in preschool through 12th grade as of the 2019–2020 school year.

A special point of interest is the full 7 year Association of Christian Schools International accreditation that was given to WCS after their re-accreditation visit in the spring of 2006.

== History ==
The school was founded in 1978. It is located on 22 acres (89,000 m^{2}) at the western edge of Elgin, just past Randall Road. The high school wing was completed in 1999 and a gymnasium and additional classrooms to house the junior high program was completed in the spring of 2004. Westminster Christian High School's first senior class graduated in June 1997.

== Administration ==
- Debbie Layne, Elementary Principal
- Carlye Hay, Head Of School
- Laila Oliveira, Middle and High School Principal

== Athletics ==
Westminster is part of the Illinois High School Association and competes in the Northeastern Athletic Conference.

=== Sports offered ===
Westminster offers Boys' and Girls':

- Soccer
- Basketball
- Baseball
- Volleyball
- American football

=== State championships ===
- Baseball: 2009–2010
