= Lewis Steward =

American politician

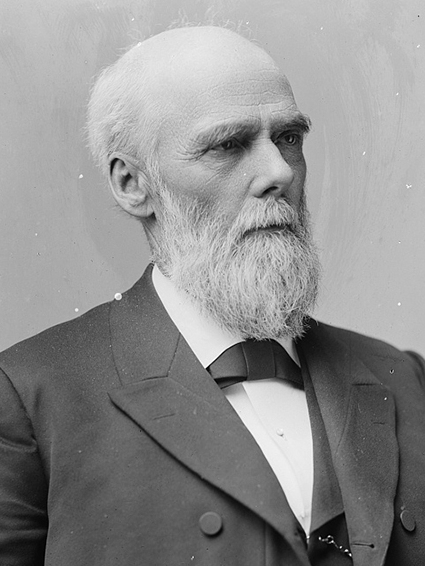

Member of the U.S. House of Representatives from Illinois' 8th district
- In office March 4, 1891 – March 3, 1893
- Preceded by: Charles A. Hill
- Succeeded by: Robert A. Childs

Personal details
- Born: November 20, 1824 Wayne County, Pennsylvania, U.S.
- Died: August 27, 1896 (aged 71) Plano, Illinois, U.S.
- Party: Democratic
- Profession: Farmer and businessman

Lewis Steward (November 20, 1824 – August 27, 1896) was a U.S. representative from Illinois. He also co-founded Marsh, Steward & Company, a company that later merged to become International Harvester.

== Biography ==
Lewis Steward was born on November 20, 1824, near Hollisterville in Wayne County, Pennsylvania. He was the oldest of nine children born to Marcus and Ursula Steward. In 1838, the family moved to Little Rock Township, Kendall County, Illinois. His father purchased a farm and built mills on Big Rock Creek. Lewis would help his father with his work, eventually starting a farm of his own.

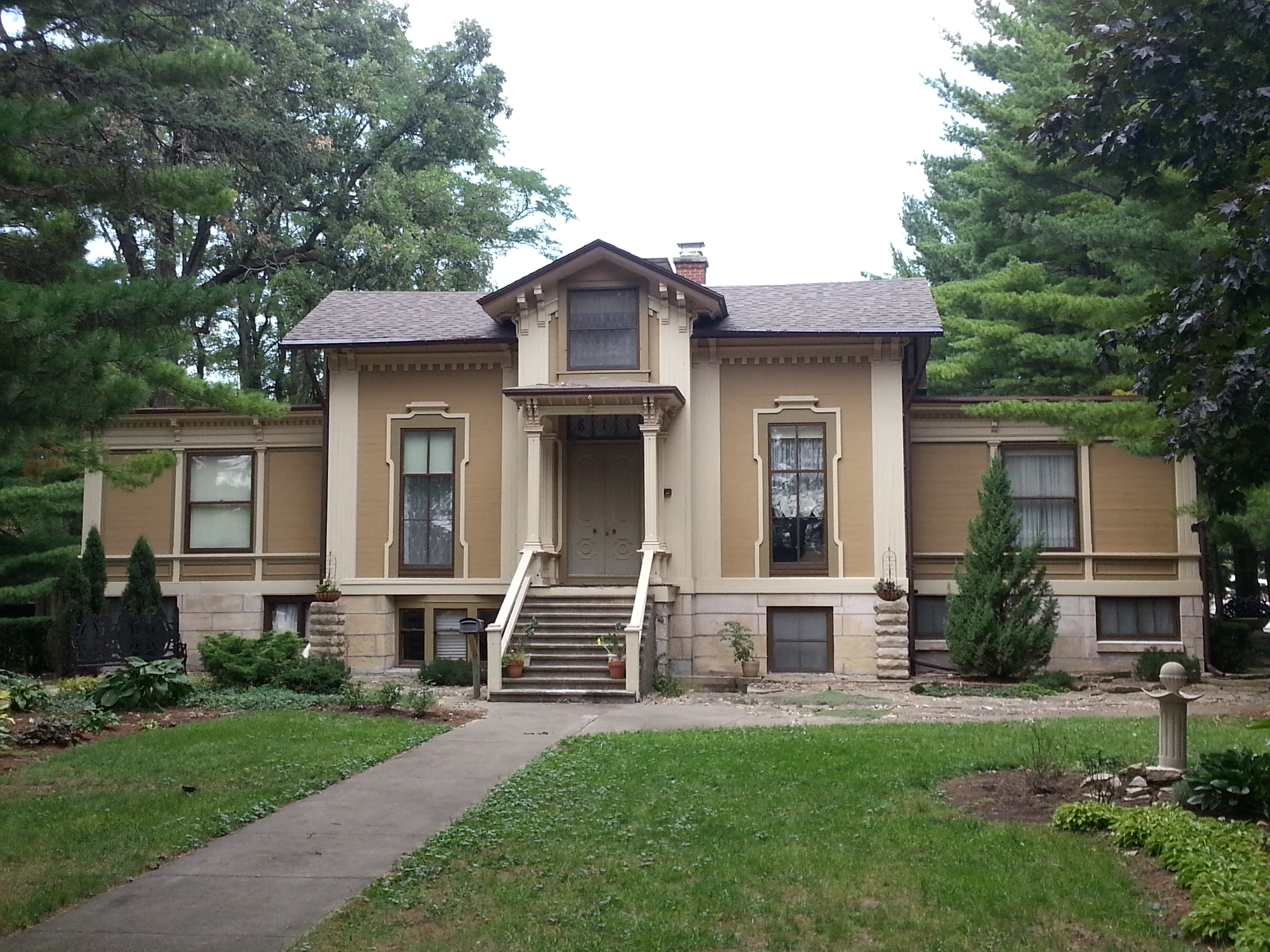
Lewis Steward built his house in 1854, shortly after securing a railroad connection to the town

In 1853, Steward was able to convince surveyors from the Chicago, Burlington & Quincy Railroad to build a station near his homestead. Once built, Steward platted the territory around the station, forming the town of Plano. He studied law in his free time and was admitted to the bar in 1860, but never practiced.

Woodcut of a Marsh Harvester prototype

C. W. and W. W. Marsh approached Steward in 1862, offering an investment opportunity in their harvesting machine operation. Stewart worked with the Marshes to perfect their prototype, and by 1863, they had established the Plano Harvester Works as Marsh, Steward & Company. In their first year of operation, the company sold 100 machines. By the mid 1870s, they were producing 10,000 a year. In 1875, investor William Deering purchased the company and moved it to North Chicago, renaming it the Deering Harvester Company. In 1902, the company merged with the McCormick Harvesting Machine Company to form International Harvester.

Steward chose to remain in Plano. In 1876, he ran for Governor of Illinois as the Democratic Party candidate. Although he lost, it was by a much closer margin (5,000 votes) than other recent candidates from the party. Also that year, Steward purchased a boot and shoe factory, producing goods from a tannery that he had started in 1864. By 1877, Steward was worth over $250,000.

In the 1880s, Steward turned to philanthropic pursuits. He donated land to local churches and assisted with construction. He started a park and built an opera house. Steward funded an annual trip for young boys and girls to the circus. He built a water system for Plano and sold it to the town in 1888. In 1890, he was elected as a Democrat to the United States House of Representatives, serving one two-year term with the 52nd Congress. He ran unsuccessfully for the same office in 1892 and 1894. He died in Plano at the age of 71 on August 27, 1896. His 1854 house was listed on the National Register of Historic Places on November 28, 2003.

Party political offices
Vacant Title last held by John R. Eden	Democratic nominee for Governor of Illinois; 1876	Succeeded by Lyman Trumbull
U.S. House of Representatives
Preceded by Charles A. Hill	Member of the U.S. House of Representatives from Illinois's 8th congressional district 1891-1893	Succeeded by Robert A. Childs
