= Northeastern Athletic Conference (Illinois) =

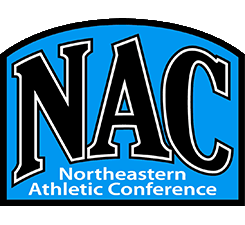
- Conference: IHSA
- Founded: 2009
- No. of teams: 12
- Region: Northeast and North-central Illinois
- Official website: NAC.8to18.com

Locations of NEAC Schools

The Northeastern Athletic Conference is a high school conference in northeast and north central Illinois. The conference participates in athletics and activities in the Illinois High School Association. The conference comprises 3 small public high schools and 9 small private school, with enrollments between 19 and 850 students in Cook, DeKalb, Kane, Kendall, LaSalle, McHenry, and Winnebago counties.

== History ==
Established in 2009 with nine teams from various conferences including five teams from the Indian Trails Conference, which is a member of the Wisconsin Interscholastic Athletic Association, the Northeastern Athletic Conference included teams from the communities of Arlington Heights, Aurora, Chicago, Elgin, Hebron, Kirkland, Mooseheart, and Rockford. After the conclusion of the 2011–12 school year, Rockford Christian left the conference and Elgin's Harvest Christian Academy joined the league. The conference expanded to 10 teams prior to the 2013–14 school year as Crystal Lake's Faith Lutheran High School joined. The conference expanded yet again in 2015 with the addition of Aurora Christian High School, taking the total to 11 teams. The following season the conference expanded to its largest total by adding two teams; Schaumburg Christian High School from Schaumburg, and South Beloit High School from South Beloit making a total of 13 teams. In 2017 the league would shrink back to 12 as Chicago's Luther North High School would close its doors after 108 years of educating students. The league would change again in 2018 after Aurora Christian would leave to join the Metro Suburban Conference, however, Parkview Christian Academy from Yorkville would take their place, keeping the league at 12. In 2019, Faith Lutheran High School would begin a coop with existing conference school Alden-Hebron High School. This coop would allow Our Lady of the Sacred Heart Academy to join, again keeping the league with 12 members.

=== Current membership ===
School	Location	County	Mascot	Colors	School Type	Joined	Enrollment	IHSA Classes 2/3/4	IHSA Music Class	IHSA Football Class	IHSA Cheerleading Class
Alden-Hebron; High School	Hebron, IL	McHenry	Giants/Lady Giants	Green, Black, White	Public Coed	2009	110.5	A/1A/1A	D	1A	Small squad
Christian Liberty; Academy	Arlington Heights, IL	Cook	Chargers	Royal Blue, White	Non-Public Coed	2009	110/ 181.5 multiplied	A/1A/1A	D	1A	Small squad
Christian Life; High School	Rockford, IL	Winnebago	Eagles/Lady Eagles	Blue, Silver, White	Non-Public Coed	2009	143/ 235.9 multiplied	A/1A/2A	C	2A (Coop)	Small squad
Harvest Christian; Academy	Elgin, IL	Kane	Lions	Navy, Vegas Gold	Non-Public Coed	2017	210/ 347.3 multiplied	A/1A/1A	B	3A	Small squad
Keith Country Day School	Rockford, IL	Winnebago	Cougars	Blue, Red, White	Non-Public Coed	2009	101/ 166.6 multiplied	A/1A/1A	D	1A	Small squad
Mooseheart; School	Mooseheart, IL	Kane	Red Ramblers/Lady Ramblers	Red, White, Black	Non-Public Coed	2009	98.5/ 162.5 multiplied	A/1A/1A	D	3A (Coop)	Small squad
Our Lady of the Sacred Heart; Academy	Rockford, IL	Winnebago	Guardians	Royal Blue, Red	Non-Public Coed	2017	19/ 31.3 multiplied	A/1A/1A	D	1A	Small squad
Parkview Christian; Academy	Yorkville, IL	Kendall	Falcons	Columbia Blue, Navy, Silver	Non-Public Coed	2018	56/ 92.4 multiplied	A/1A/1A	D	1A	Small squad
Schaumburg Christian; School	Schaumburg, IL	Cook	Conquerors	Orange, Black, White	Non-Public Coed	2016	184.5/ 304.4 multiplied	A/1A/1A	C	1A	Small squad
South Beloit; High School	South Beloit, IL	Winnebago	Sobos	Scarlet Red, White	Public Coed	2016	262	A/1A/1A	C	1A	Small squad
Westminster Christian; High School	Elgin, IL	Kane	Warriors	Royal Blue, White	Non-Public Coed	2009	157.5/ 259.9 multiplied	A/1A/1A	C	3A (Coop)	Small squad

Sources:IHSA Conferences, IHSA Coop Teams, and IHSA Member Schools Directory

=== Football only members ===
School	Location	County	Mascot	Colors	School Type	Joined	Enrollment	IHSA Classes 2/3/4	IHSA Music Class	IHSA Football Class	IHSA Cheerleading Class
Kirkland-Hiawatha; High School	Kirkland, IL	DeKalb	Hawks	Blue, Gold	Non-Public Coed	2009	170	A/1A/1A	D	1A	Small squad
Ottawa Marquette; High School	Ottawa, IL	LaSalle	Crusaders/Lady Crusaders	Navy, Vegas Gold	Non-Public Coed	2012	159/ 263.1 multiplied	A/1A/1A	B	3A	Small squad
Rockford Christian; High School	Rockford, IL	Winnebago	Royal Lions	Blue, Metallic Gold, Black	Non-Public Coed	2009	378.5/ 624.5 multiplied	AA/2A/2A	A	3a (Coop)	Small squad
Walther Christian; Academy	Melrose Park, IL	Cook	Broncos	Green, White	Non-Public Coed	2018	276/ 344.4 multiplied	A/1A/1A	D	3A	Small squad

=== Previous members ===
School	Location	County	Mascot	Colors	School Type	Joined	Exited	IHSA Classes 2/3/4	IHSA Music Class	IHSA Football Class	IHSA Cheerleading Class
Aurora Christian; High School	Aurora, IL	Kane	Eagles	Red, White, Gray	Non-Public Coed	2015	2018	A/1A/2A	C	3A (Coop)	Small squad
Faith Lutheran; High School	Chicago, IL	Cook	Saints	Red, Black	Non-Public Coed	2013	2018 (closed)	A/1A/1A	D	1A	Small squad
Luther North; High School	Chicago, IL	Cook	Wildcats	Scarlet Blue, Gold	Non-Public Coed	2009	2017 (closed)	A/1A/1A	D	1A	Small squad
Illinois Math & Science Academy; High School	Aurora, IL	Kane	Titans	Light Blue,Navy Blue,White	Public Coed	2009	2020	A/1A/2A	C	3A	Medium Squad

=== Previous football only members ===
School	Location	County	Mascot	Colors	School Type	Joined	Exited	IHSA Classes 2/3/4	IHSA Music Class	IHSA Football Class	IHSA Cheerleading Class
Chicago Hope; Academy	Chicago, IL	Cook	Eagles	Navy Blue, White	Non-Public Coed	2009	2017	A/1A/1A	D	3A	Small squad
Chicago Longwood; High School	Chicago, IL	Cook	Panthers	Blue, Gray	Non-Public Coed	2013	2018	A/2A/2A	B	1A	Medium squad
North Shore; Country Day	Winnetka, IL	Cook	Raiders	Purple, White	Non-Public Coed	2009	2015	A/1A/2A	C	3A	Small squad
Varna Midland; High School	Varna, IL	Marshall	Timberwolves	Dark Green, Silver, Black	Public Coed	2016	2019	A/1A/1A	D	1A	Small squad

== Membership timeline ==
Other Conference Full members Full members (non-football) Partial member (listed sports) Football Only) Full members (Football Coop) Other Conference
