= Plano Hotel =

- U.S. National Register of Historic Places
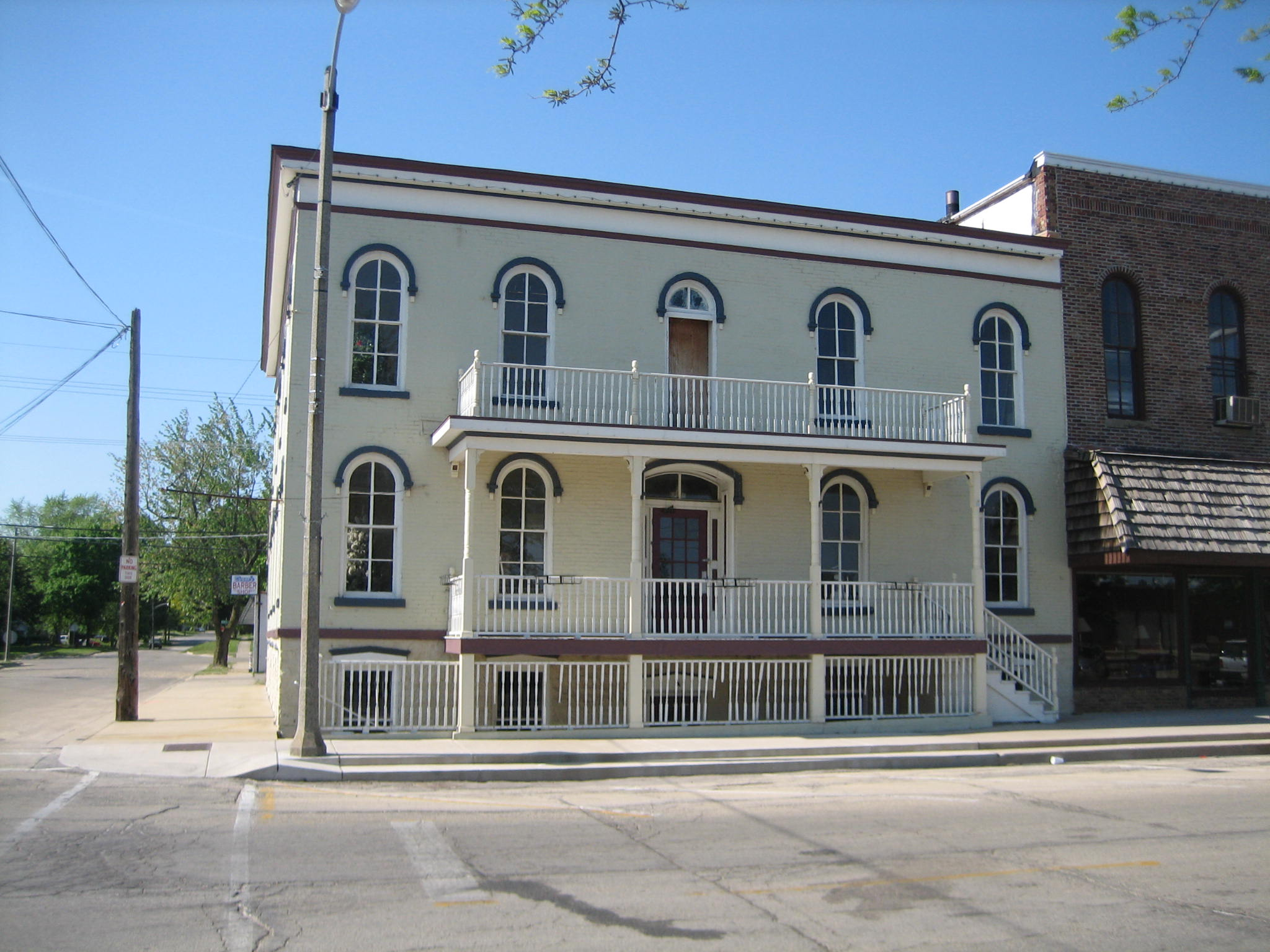

- Location within Illinois Location within the United States
- Interactive map showing the location of Plano Hotel
- Location: 120 W. Main St., Plano, Illinois
- Coordinates: 41°39′44″N 88°32′21″W
- Area: less than one acre
- Built: 1868
- Architectural style: Italianate
- NRHP reference No.: 93001239
- Added to NRHP: November 12, 1993

The Plano Hotel is a 19th-century hotel building located in Plano, Illinois, United States. It was built in 1868 by John K. Smith and reflects the Italianate architectural style. In 1993, the building was added to the U.S. National Register of Historic Places.

== History ==
The land the hotel was built on was owned by three men, Cornelius Henning, John Hollister, and Marcus Steward whom were the owners of the original plat of Plano. On February 5, 1868 the land was deeded to John K. Smith. The hotel was constructed later in 1868 by Smith. Plano Hotel operated as a hotel until the 1940s when the building was converted for use as apartments.

== Architecture ==
The building is of the Italianate architectural style. The two story brick structure has a full basement and 25 rooms. Both the front and sides of the building feature arched windows. The building is located at the corner of Main and West Streets in Plano within the downtown commercial district.

== Historic significance ==
Plano Hotel is one of the oldest buildings in Plano and it remains much the same as when it was originally constructed. The hotel is the only surviving hotel from the period during the 19th century when Plano experienced railroad related growth. Providing lodging to travelers and guests to the city of Plano, the Plano Hotel played a significant role in the early commerce of Plano. The Plano Hotel was added to the U.S. National Register of Historic Places on November 12, 1993.

== See also ==
- National Register of Historic Places listings in Kendall County, Illinois
