= Plano Stone Church =

Historic church in Illinois, United States

- Plano Stone Church (Community of Christ)
- U.S. National Register of Historic Places
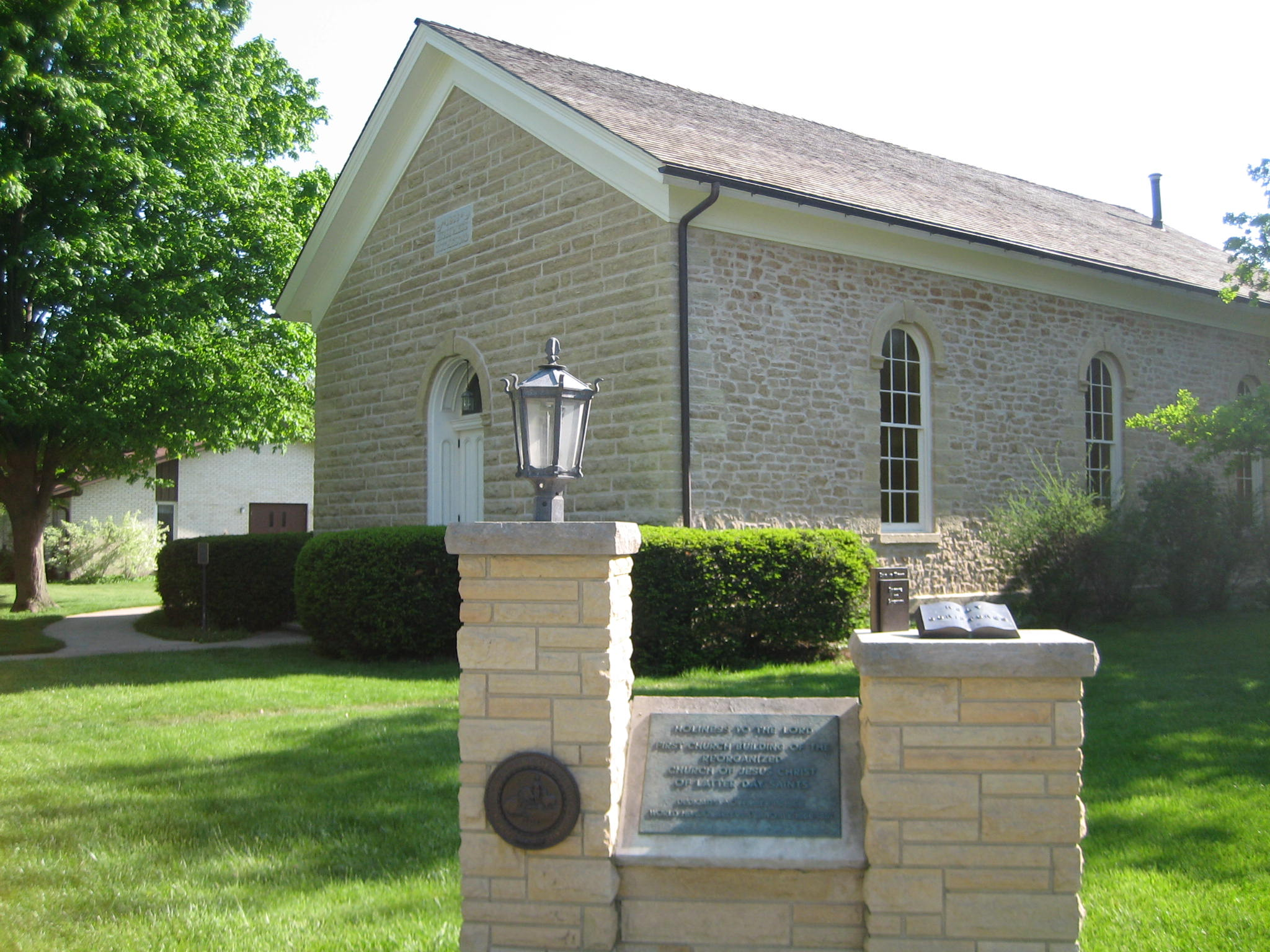
- Side of the church

- Location within Illinois Location within the United States
- Location: 304 S. Center Ave., Plano, Illinois
- Coordinates: 41°39′33″N 88°32′9″W
- Area: less than one acre
- Built: 1868
- Architectural style: Greek Revival
- NRHP reference No.: 90001724
- Added to NRHP: November 2, 1990

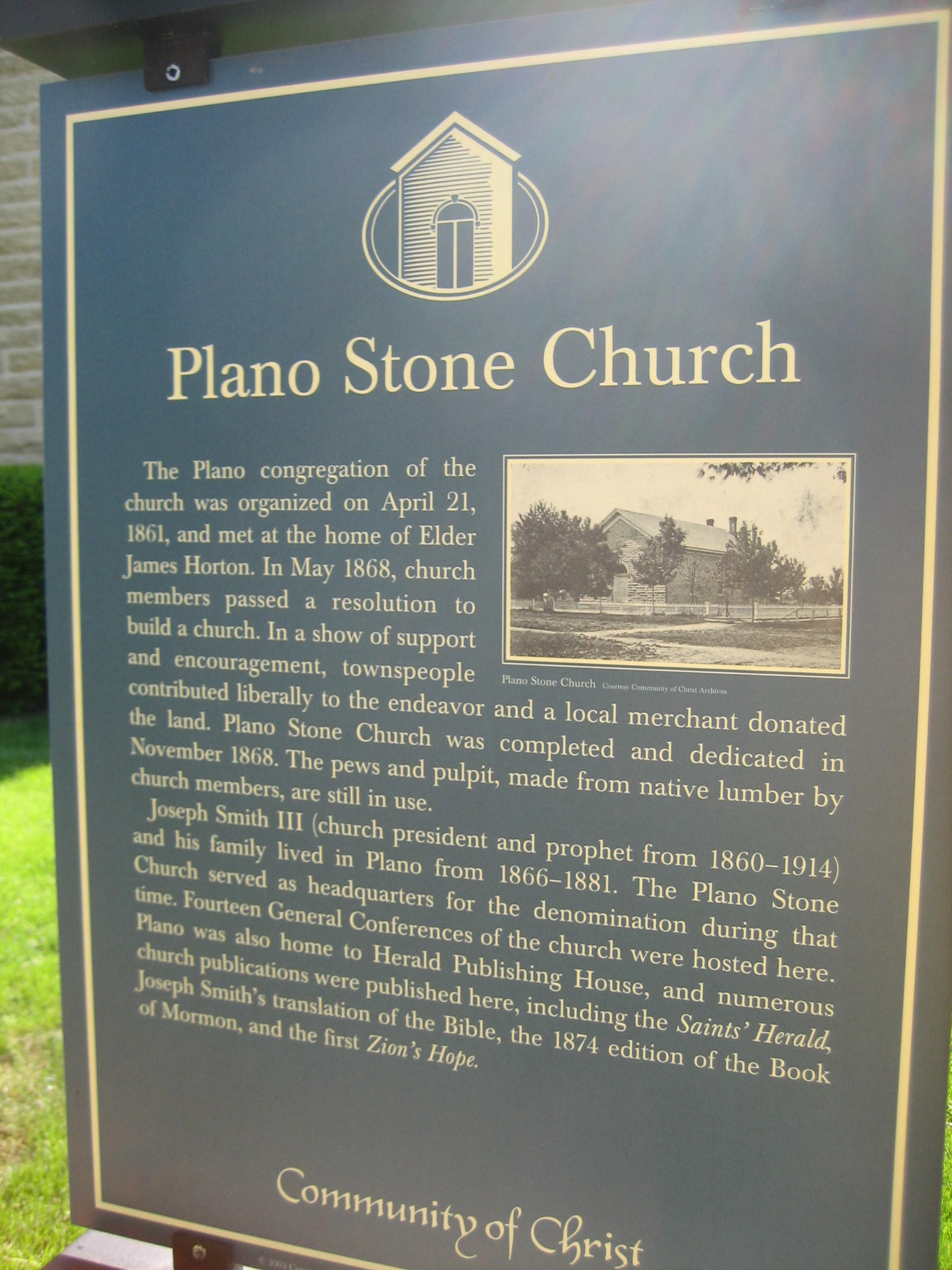
Plano Stone Church, National Register of Historic Places.

The Plano Stone Church was constructed in 1868 to serve as the headquarters for the Reorganized Church of Jesus Christ of Latter Day Saints (RLDS Church, now Community of Christ) under the leadership of Joseph Smith III. Smith moved to Plano, Illinois, in 1866 and in 1867 was appointed head of the Stone Church's building committee. Smith and the committee selected the site, design and builder for the structure. The Plano Stone Church served as the headquarters of the RLDS from its completion in 1868 until Smith, his family, and the church moved to Lamoni, Iowa, in 1881.

The building is constructed in the Greek Revival style with exterior walls of sandstone. The interior consists of two rooms, a vestibule and the main room. The structure underwent a series of changes during the 1940s including the enclosure of two alcoves in the vestibule. Plano Stone Church was added to the U.S. National Register of Historic Places in 1990.

== History ==
Joseph Smith III became the president and prophet of the Reorganized Church of Jesus Christ of Latter Day Saints (RLDS) in 1860, 16 years after the death of his father Joseph Smith. Following the elder Smith's murder in Carthage, Illinois, many of the faithful in the Midwest accepted Brigham Young's leadership and followed him to the Salt Lake Basin. A group of Latter Day Saints did stay behind in the Midwest, believing that the rightful line of succession for church leadership lay with Smith. The younger Smith accepted the leadership role with the newly named "Reorganized Church of Jesus Christ of Latter Day Saints" after church leaders attempted several times to persuade him.

Plans for Smith's move commenced in 1865, and by January 1866 Smith and his family had relocated from Nauvoo to Plano, Illinois. Smith was persuaded to make the move by church members and leaders in Kendall County; the headquarters of the RLDS moved from Nauvoo to Plano with the Smith family. Once in Plano, Smith became the editor-in-chief of the Saints Herald, the official publication the RLDS.

In 1867 the congregation in Plano appointed a building committee for the construction of a church building for the congregation, naming Smith as its chairman. Smith and the committee selected the site, design and builders for the project. Work on the building started on March 18, 1868 and by November 15 the completed church was dedicated. The building served as the main house of worship for the Plano RLDS congregation from its completion until 1881, and was the first church building for any congregation of the RLDS. During this period it also served as headquarters for the RLDS church and Smith's base of operations as church leader.

Between 1868 and 1881 Smith was active in church leadership and local politics, holding office as village trustee and local justice of the peace. He resigned his position as magistrate in March 1880 after he met with criticism for canceling a court hearing in favor of a church appointment. In 1881 RLDS headquarters, the church's printing house and Joseph Smith III moved from Plano to Lamoni, Iowa, a community established by RLDS members during the 1870s.

The church building is still home to a congregation of the RLDS, renamed Community of Christ in 2001. The original church pews, constructed by congregation members from local lumber, are still in use. The facility offers public tours by appointment.

== Architecture ==
The building is cast in the Greek Revival style, and its foundation and walls are constructed from sandstone. The one-story, symmetrical, rectangular building has a front gabled roof which meets the wall with a slight overhang and wide frieze below; both features are typical of the Greek Revival style. The front (east) facade is built from rock-face sandstone in regular courses, the three remaining walls feature rough-cut stone in irregular courses. Each side wall (north and south) has four windows with round, stone, arched lintels, keystones and stone sills. Each window features a full round arch and a nine over nine sash. Each of the building's four corners is adorned with stone quoins as are all of the windows. The front, double-door has a semi-circular transom window and a stone hood with a keystone above it.

The interior of the Plano Stone Church consists of two rooms, a small 8-foot (2 m) by 12-foot (4 m) vestibule at the entry way, and the main room. The main room has a cove ceiling and a raised dais at its west (front) end. The interior wainscotting, doors, and window sashes are all original. The original pews feature wrought iron end pieces and other furnishings include a wooden pulpit.

The building has undergone alterations and renovations during its history. The original stone stairs on the exterior were removed and replaced. Most of the structure's alterations occurred during the 1940s and were on its interior. Inside, there were originally two alcoves off the vestibule which contained stoves used for heating. These alcoves have since been enclosed: one serves as the basement stairway access and the other as a closet. Other changes during the 1940s include the addition of a projecting bay behind the pulpit and amber glass panes to the windows.

== Significance ==
The Plano Stone Church is most significant for its years as headquarters for the Reorganized Church of Jesus Christ of Latter Day Saints, from 1868–1881. The building, the oldest church in Plano, was declared a Kendall County Landmark in 1974. On November 2, 1990 the structure was added to the U.S. National Register of Historic Places. The church was listed on the National Register for its role as the headquarters of the RLDS and its association with the first RLDS president Joseph Smith III.

== Gallery ==
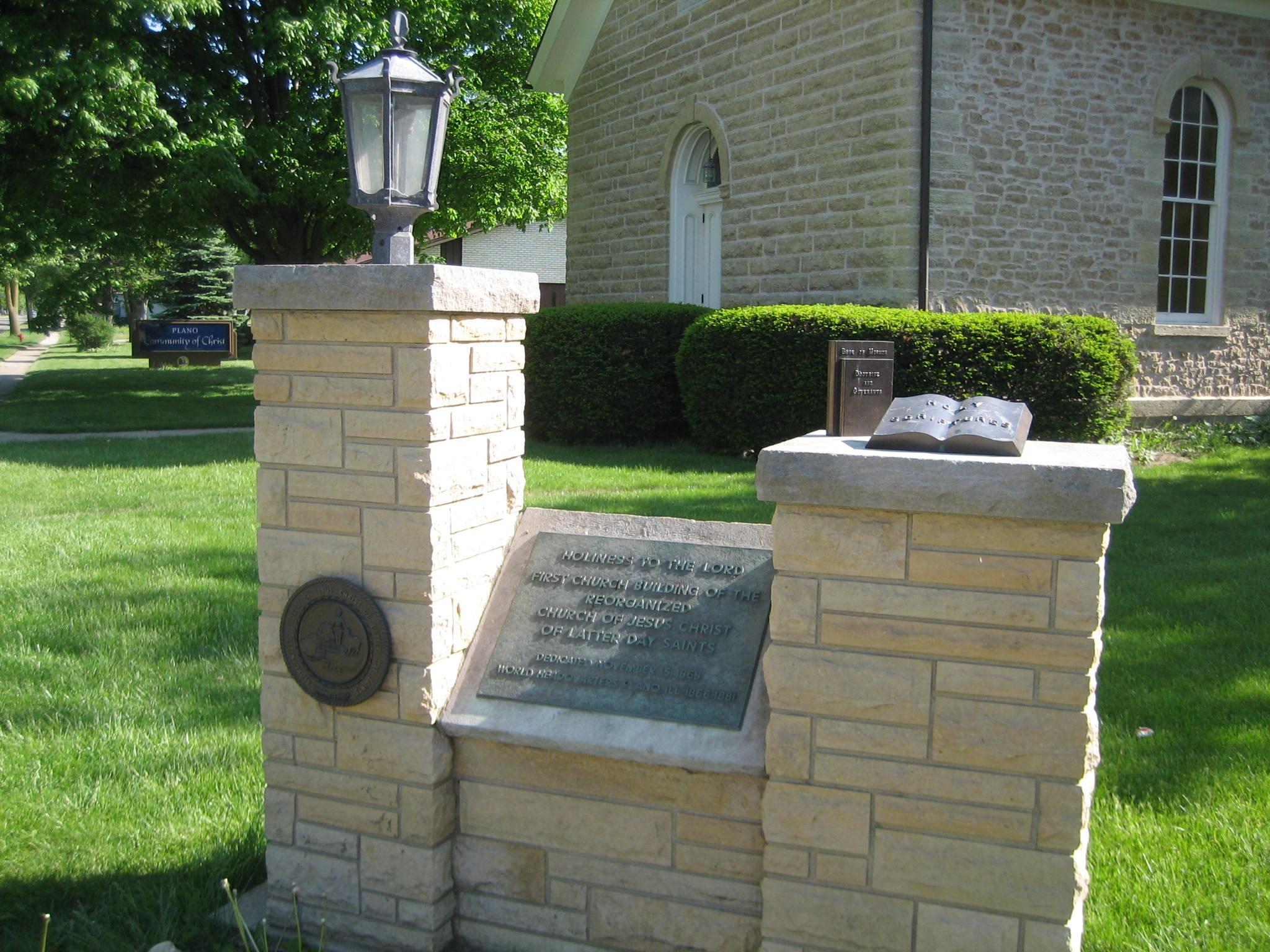
Plaque noting that the Plano Stone Church was the first RLDS church building.

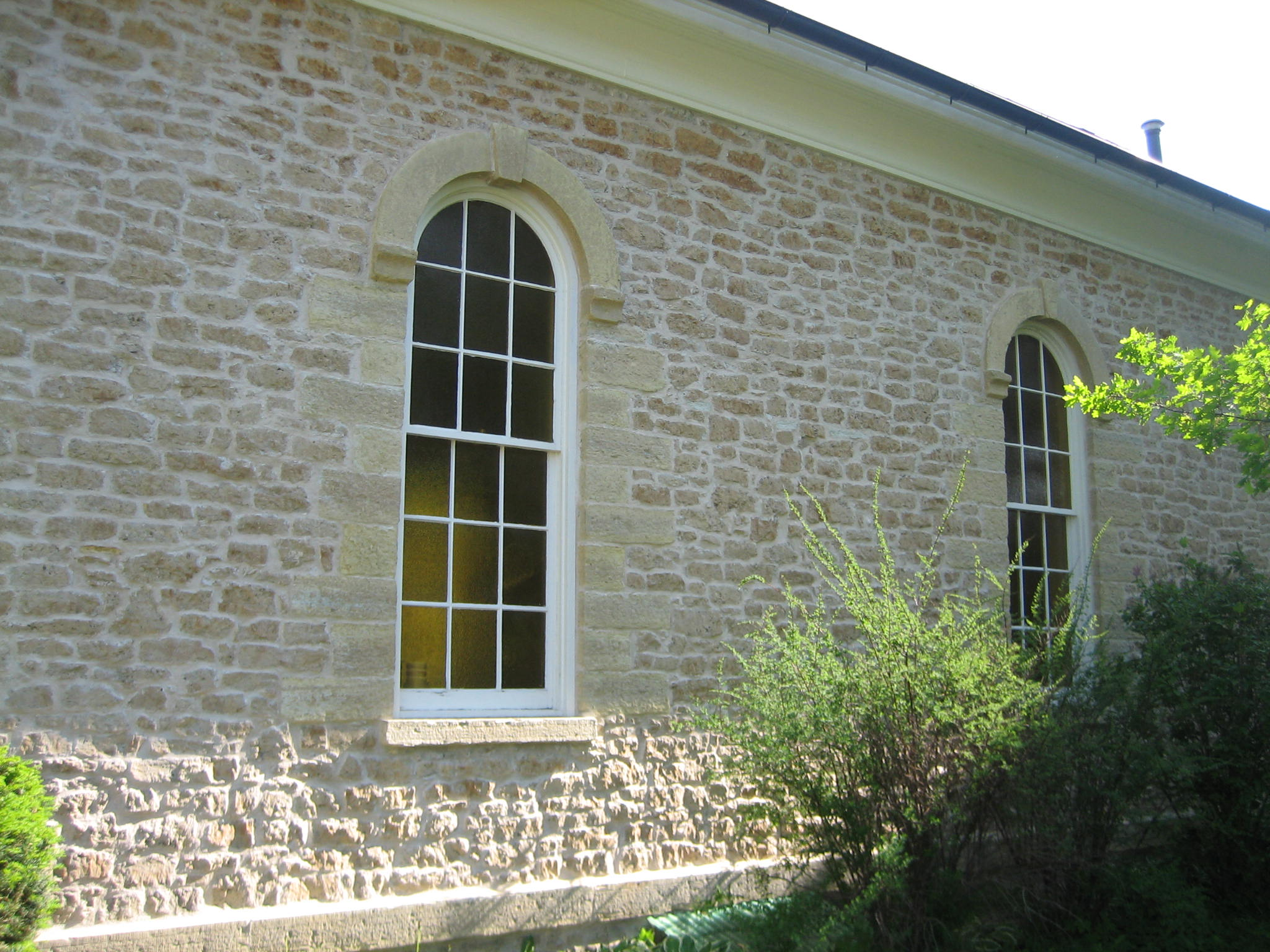
The nine over nine round arch windows.

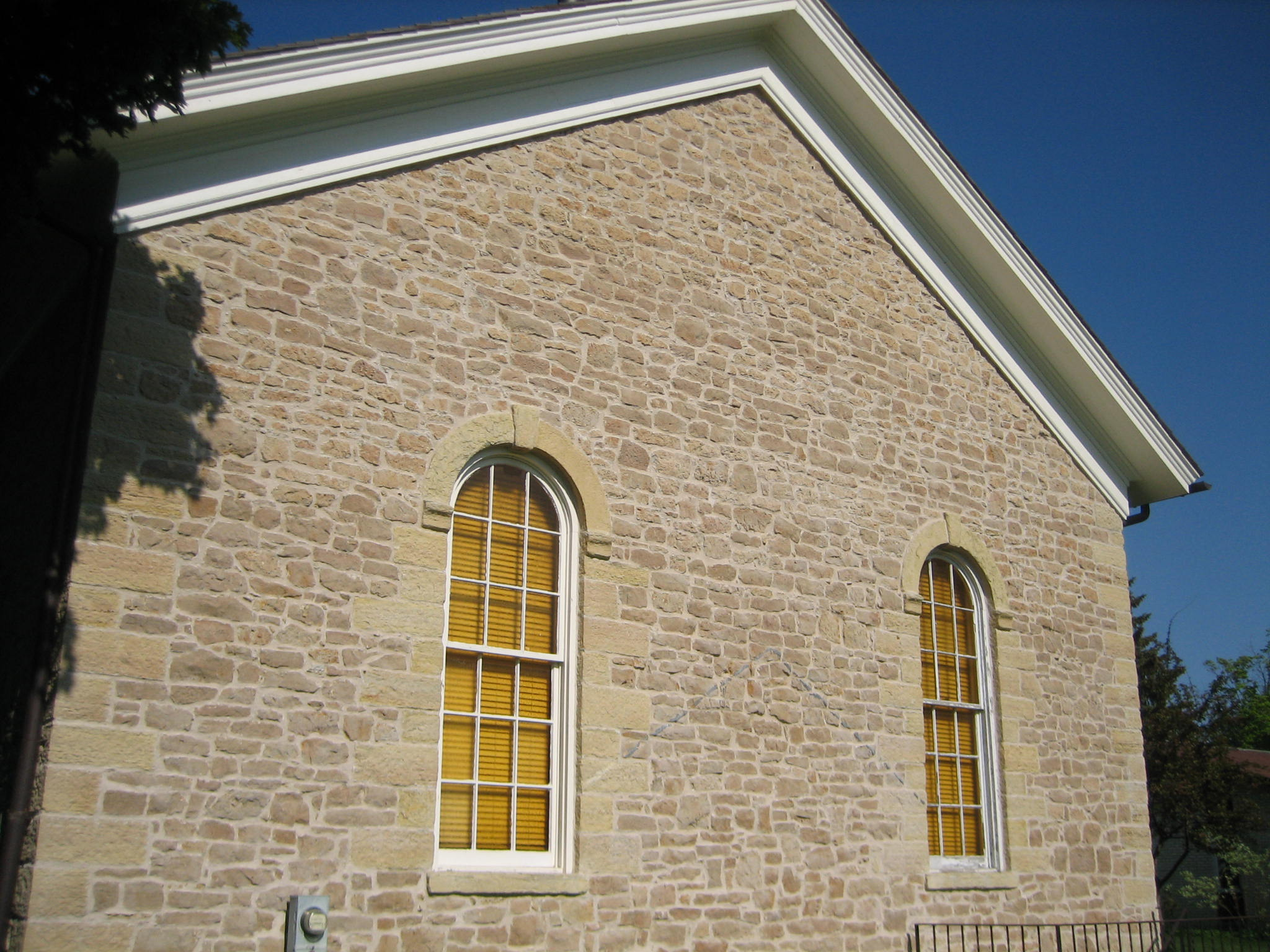
The amber glass panes were added to the windows during the 1940s.

== See also ==
- Latter Day Saint movement
- Mormonism
- National Register of Historic Places listings in Kendall County, Illinois
- Red Brick Store
- Restoration Branches
