= Faith Lutheran High School =

Location
- 174 McHenry Avenue; Crystal Lake, Illinois 60014; United States
- 42.2360°N 88.3294°W

Information
- Type: Private
- Religious affiliation: Lutheranism
- Denomination: Lutheran Church–Missouri Synod
- Established: 2004
- Status: Closed
- Closed: 2019
- Colors: Red and black
- Mascot: Saints
- Website: faithlhs.org

Faith Lutheran High School, commonly referred to as Faith or FLHS, was a private high school located in Crystal Lake, Illinois. It was affiliated with the Lutheran Church–Missouri Synod and served students of McHenry County, Illinois. The school opened in 2004 and closed in 2019. The school's colors were black and red and its mascot was the Saints.

== History ==
FLHS was founded in August 2004 with a freshman class of eight students. The first class of ten students graduated in 2008. The school was initially located at St. John's Lutheran Church in Union, Illinois. In January 2006, it moved to the unused Hawthorn school building north of Marengo, Illinois. In 2009, the school again moved to Crystal Lake, Illinois, which provided a more central location. In September 2013, FLHS purchased the building it was leasing from Immanuel Church with the expectation to handle its growth for 7–10 years.

In a July 2018 letter to students and parents, Faith Lutheran Board Chair Steven K. Wright said that the school would be closing for the upcoming academic year due to declining enrollment and increasing debt. A fundraising campaign allowed FLHS to remain open for the 2018-2019 school year. However, the school closed permanently after the end of that school year.

== Academics ==
The school had a low student-teacher ratio and touted its high ACT average, which generally averaged between 25 and 26. In 2014, the senior class averaged 27.1 and averaged over $70,000 each in scholarship offers. The school offered classes in theology, science, art, mathematics, physical education, English, social studies, practical skills, and the languages of Spanish, Latin. AP classes and a dual credit programs through McHenry County College and Grand Canyon University were offered.

== School life ==
=== Student body ===
The school worked with international programs to host exchange students from Brazil, Paraguay, China, Panama, Thailand, Germany, France, and South Korea. Approximately 5–8 percent of the students were international.

=== Athletics ===
FLHS was a member of the Northeastern Athletic Conference (NAC) and participated in a co-op with Alden Hebron High School in which FLHS students played on Hebron's football, baseball, and softball teams. Alden Hebron Students could also participate on Faith's golf and boys' volleyball teams. FLHS fall sports included boys' golf, girls' volleyball, and co-ed cross country. Winter sports were boys' basketball and girls' cheerleading. The Faith Saints also competed in co-ed track and field and boys' volleyball during the spring season.

=== Student organizations ===
Student Council was a student government that organized extracurricular programs as well as running fundraisers to help with the school's annual trip to Wisconsin Dells for its Jr/Sr Prom. Hands and Feet for Christ (HFC) was a group dedicated to community service. Illinois YMCA Youth and Government allowed students to travel to the Illinois State Capitol where students acted as delegates to pass mock legislation. A chapter of the National FFA Organization was started on the campus in 2015. The school published a newspaper and yearbook and had several a number of other campus organizations including drama, band, choir, Book Club, and Spanish Club.
