= Bristol Congregational Church =

Historic church in Illinois, United States

- U.S. National Register of Historic Places
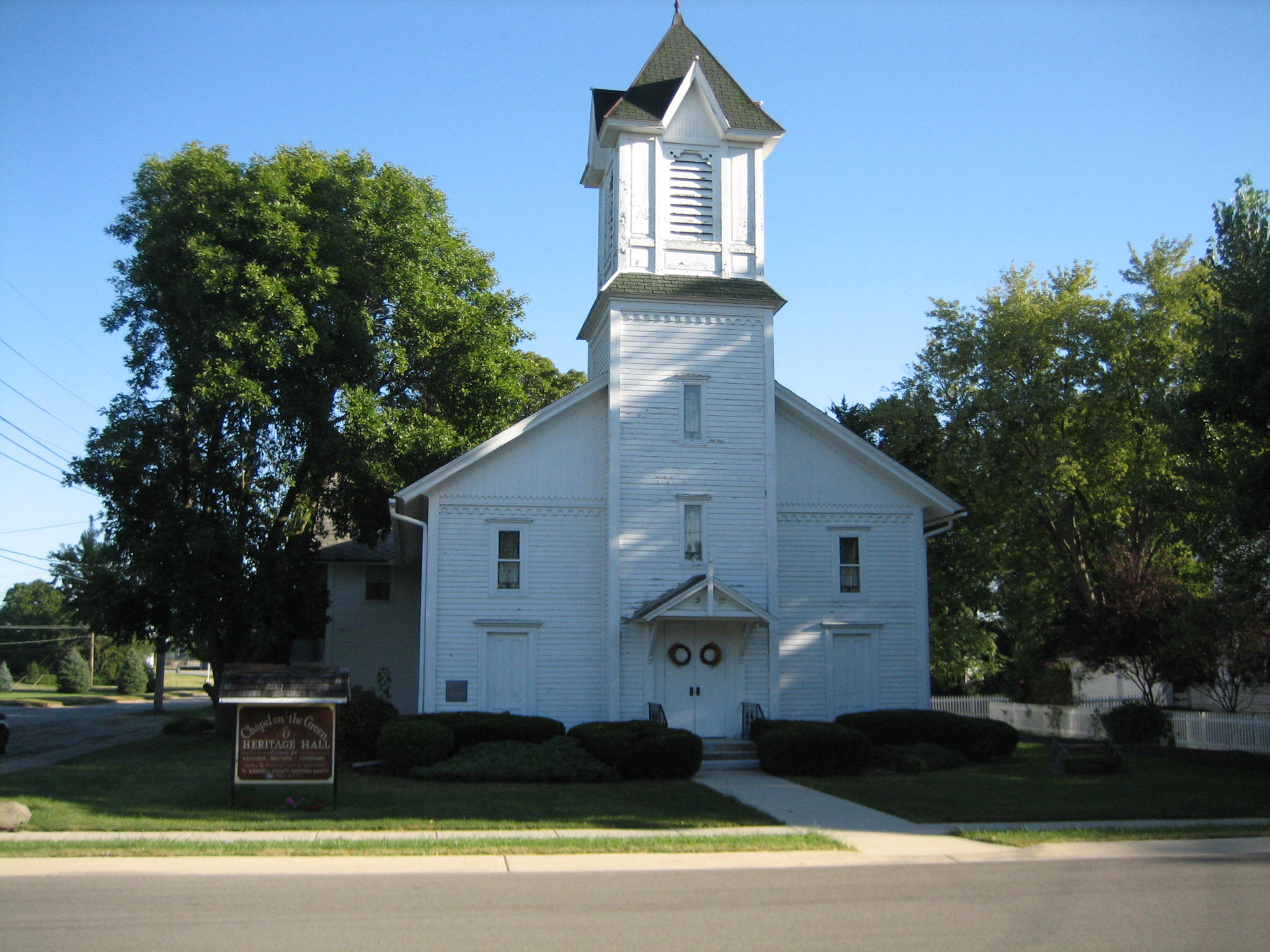

- Location within Illinois Location within the United States
- Location: 107 W. Center St., Yorkville, Illinois
- Coordinates: 41°38′51″N 88°26′50″W
- Built: 1855
- Architectural style: Greek Revival, Carpenter Gothic
- NRHP reference No.: 16000580
- Added to NRHP: September 6, 2016

Bristol Congregational Church, also known as the Chapel on the Green, is a historic church located at 107 W. Center Street in Yorkville, Illinois. The Congregational church was built in 1855 for a congregation which formed in the 1830s. The church's design came from a pattern book and includes elements of both the Greek Revival and Carpenter Gothic styles. The church's structure, which includes a bell tower, pediment, and symmetrical windows, is typical of Greek Revival churches. Its Carpenter Gothic elements are mainly decorative and include ornamental wooden trim and a finial. The church is the only remaining 19th-century church in Yorkville and its oldest non-residential building of any sort.

The church was added to the National Register of Historic Places on September 6, 2016.
