= Thomas J. Henderson (politician) =

American politician (1824–1911)

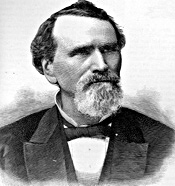

Chairman of the House Republican Conference
- In office March 4, 1889 – March 3, 1895
- Speaker: Thomas B. Reed (1889–1891); Charles F. Crisp (1891–1895)
- Preceded by: Joseph G. Cannon
- Succeeded by: Charles H. Grosvenor

Member of the U.S. House of Representatives from Illinois
- In office March 4, 1875 – March 3, 1895
- Preceded by: John B. Hawley (6th); William Cullen (7th)
- Succeeded by: Robert R. Hitt (6th); George E. Foss (7th)
- Constituency: 6th district (1875-83); 7th district (1883-95)

Member of the Illinois Senate
- In office 1852-1860

Member of the Illinois House of Representatives
- In office 1857-1860

Personal details
- Born: November 29, 1824 Brownsville, Tennessee, U.S.
- Died: February 6, 1911 (aged 86) Washington, D.C., U.S.
- Party: Republican

Thomas Jefferson Henderson (November 29, 1824 – February 6, 1911) was a U.S. representative from Illinois and a Union Army officer during the American Civil War.

== Biography ==
Born in Brownsville, Tennessee, Henderson moved with his parents to Illinois at the age of eleven. He served as clerk of the Board of Commissioners of Stark County, Illinois from 1847 to 1849. and as clerk of the court of Stark County from 1849 to 1853. He studied law, was admitted to the bar in 1852 and commenced practice in Toulon, Illinois.

Henderson served as a member of the Illinois House of Representatives in 1855 and 1856 and then as a member of the Illinois Senate (1857–1860). He entered the Union Army in 1862 as colonel of the 112th Illinois Volunteer Infantry Regiment and fought in the siege of Knoxville and Atlanta campaign being wounded at the Battle of Resaca. He commanded the 3rd Brigade, 3rd Division, XXIII Corps, from August 12, 1864. He was brevetted brigadier general in January 1865 and led his brigade at the Battle of Wilmington. After the war, he was elected as a companion of the Illinois Commandery of the Military Order of the Loyal Legion of the United States.

With the war's end, Henderson resumed the practice of law and moved to Princeton, Illinois, in 1867. He was appointed collector of internal revenue for the fifth district of Illinois in 1871.

Henderson was elected as a Republican to the Forty-fourth and to the nine succeeding Congresses (March 4, 1875 – March 3, 1895). He served as chairman of the Committee on Military Affairs (Forty-seventh Congress), and of the Committee on Rivers and Harbors (Fifty-first Congress). He also served as chairman of the Republican conference in the House. He was an unsuccessful candidate for renomination in 1894.

He was appointed to the board of managers for the National Home for Disabled Volunteer Soldiers in 1896. He was appointed civilian member on the Board of Ordnance and Fortifications in 1900 and served until his death in Washington, D.C., on February 6, 1911. He was interred in Oakland Cemetery in Princeton, Illinois.

== Bibliography ==
- United States Congress. "Thomas J. Henderson (id: H000489)". Biographical Directory of the United States Congress.

U.S. House of Representatives
Preceded by John B. Hawley	Member of the U.S. House of Representatives from Illinois's 6th congressional district 1875–1883	Succeeded by Robert R. Hitt
Preceded by William Cullen	Member of the U.S. House of Representatives from Illinois's 7th congressional district 1883–1895	Succeeded by George E. Foss
