= Albert H. Sears House =

Historic house in Illinois, United States

- U.S. National Register of Historic Places
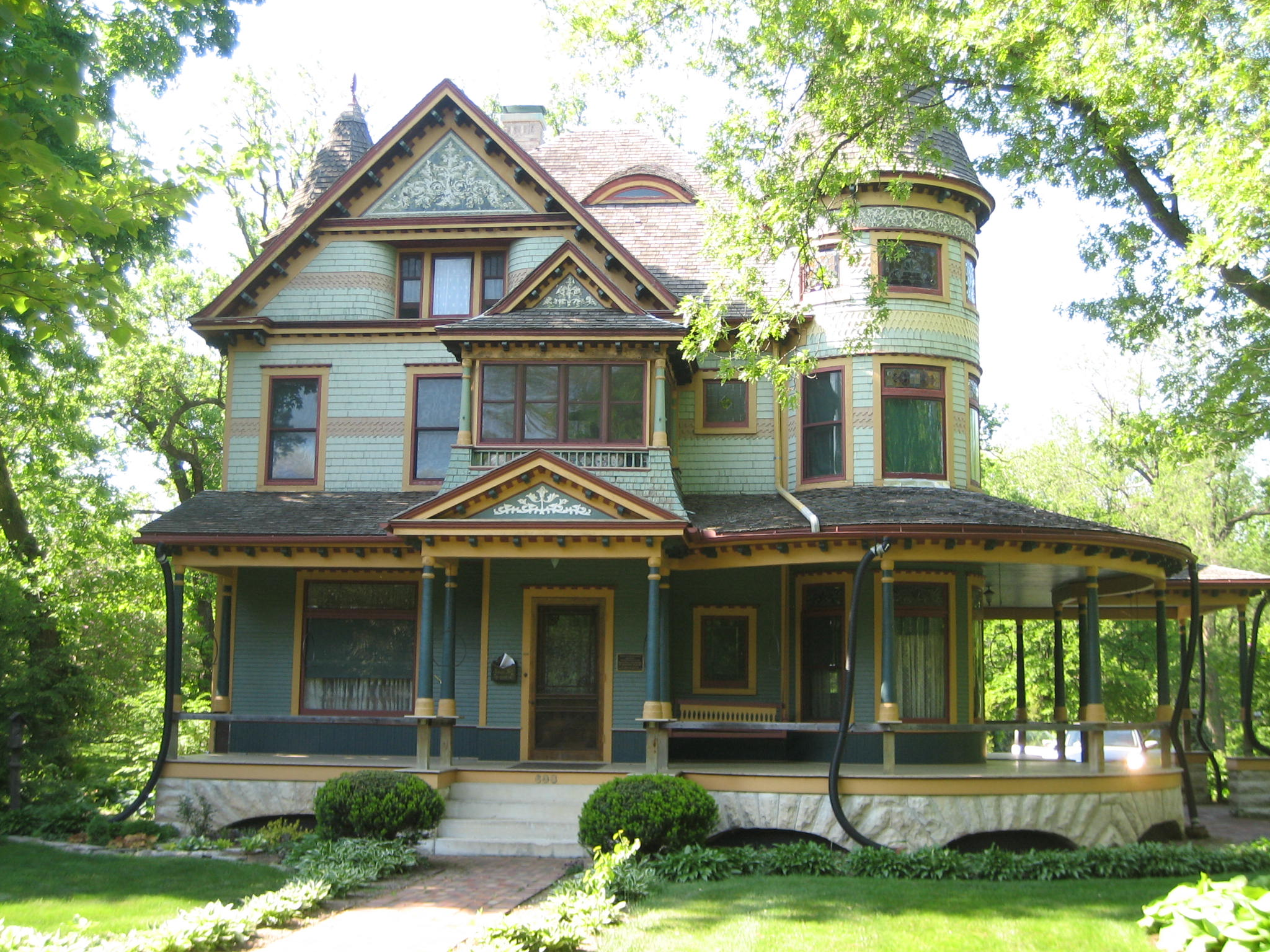

- Location within Illinois Location within the United States
- Interactive map showing the location of the Albert H Sears House
- Location: 603 E. North St., Plano, Illinois
- Coordinates: 41°39′54″N 88°31′48″W
- Area: 2 acres (0.81 ha)
- Built: 1881
- Architect: E.H. Gammon and E.L. Hardin (builders)
- Architectural style: Queen Anne
- NRHP reference No.: 86003720
- Added to NRHP: January 29, 1987

The Albert H. Sears House, also known as "Robin's Nest," is a house in the U.S. city of Plano, Illinois. It is an example of Queen Anne style architecture in the United States. The house was constructed in 1881 for prominent Plano businessman Albert H. Sears. The home sits on nearly two acres of forested land and is considered a good example of Queen Anne style and the elegance surrounding that era. The building was listed on the U.S. National Register of Historic Places on January 29, 1987.

== History ==
Albert H. Sears was born just north of Plano, Illinois on May 14, 1856. His father was a surveyor and one of the first residents of Kendall County. Sears attended Plano High School and the Aurora Seminary. After graduating in 1877, he took a job as the head of shipping for the Deering Harvester Company. A year later, he became a traveling salesman for the burgeoning company. When the company moved to North Chicago, founder William Deering moved to Evanston. He then sold his newly completed house to Albert Sears.

Sears remained in Plano and co-founded the Plano Manufacturing Company, using the former Deering plant. The company manufactured farm implements and employed 70 people. Sears was on the board of directors and was General Superintendent of the plant until 1883. Starting in 1883, Sears ran the Sears Bank. The Plano Manufacturing Company moved to West Pullman in 1894. Sears again stayed in Plano and again purchased the former Deering plant. Sears opened it the next year as the Sears Manufacturing Works, producing farm implements. It was sold to the Independent Harvester Company in 1910. Sears died in his home on April 2, 1917.

== See also ==
- National Register of Historic Places listings in Kendall County, Illinois
