= Marsh, Steward & Company =

American agricultural machinery manufacturers

1860 Marsh Harvester

Marsh, Steward & Company (Marsh Brothers) (Marsh Harvester) (Marsh Brothers & Steward) began with the invention and patent of a reaper-harvester by brothers Charles Wesley Marsh and W. W. Marsh of De Kalb, Illinois in August 1858. By 1863 the improved machine, known as the Marsh Harvester, was manufactured at Plano, Illinois by C. W. Marsh and George Steward, under the firm name of Steward and Marsh. W.W.Marsh and Lewis Steward joined the company in the 1860s. In October, 1875, the business was sold to Gannon and Deering, of Chicago, Illinois.

The Marsh Harvester was a reaper and a hand-binder, on which two men rode, and bound the sheaves by hand. It is the half-way mark, the child of the reaper and the parent of the self-binder. The theory of the inventors was that two men might bind the grain cut by the five-foot sickle in ordinary motion provided it could be delivered to them in the best possible position and condition for binding and if they could have perfect freedom of action. They knew that the binders must have a free swing and open chance at the grain to enable them to handle it, so they arranged the elevated delivery, the receptacle, the tables and the platform for the man with these things in view. The Marsh brothers believed two men riding and binding could do the work of four men walking and binding.

The Company's Marsh Harvester sales per year were

Year	Total
1864	26
1865	24
1866	100
1867	300
1868	300
1869	750
1870	1000

Year	Total
1871	1400
1872	1400
1873	2750
1874	5000
1875	5000
1876	5000
