= 15th Illinois Infantry Regiment =

15th Regiment Illinois Volunteer Infantry
- Illinois flag
- Active: April 25, 1861, to September 16, 1865
- Country: United States
- Allegiance: Union
- Branch: United States Army; Union Army
- Type: Infantry
- Engagements: Fort Donelson; Battle of Shiloh; Siege of Vicksburg

The 15th Illinois Infantry Regimenty was an infantry regiment that served in the Union Army during the American Civil War.

== Service ==
The 15th Illinois Infantry Volunteer Regiment was raised under the 10 Regiment Act. The 15th Illinois Infantry was mustered at Freeport, Illinois, on May 24, 1861.

Companies A, D, and F were made from volunteers from McHenry County, Company B was made by volunteers from Boone County, Company C was from Winnebago County, Company E hailed from Jo Daviess County, Company G came from Stephenson County, Company H was from Ogle County, Company I was from Lake County, and Company K was from Carroll County.

The 15 and 14th Illinois participated together in movements around Rolla Mo. ahead of the Fort Donelson Campaign. By the completion of the Donelson Campaign, with General Ulysses S. Grant in command, the 14th and 15th Illinois were part of General Steven A. Hurlbut's 4th 'Fighting Fourth' Division and assigned a camp near the Union left wing at Pittsburgh Landing. Both regiments were brigaded under the command of Colonel James C. Veatch, and ordered to decamp and move out to support the heavily pressed General Sherman on the right wing. Anecdotal memoir by Sgt. Moses Gleason Montgomery describe heavy fighting at the Hornet's Nest before proceeding on to their defensive position supporting the retreat of the right wing.

Sgt Montgomery was shot in the chest during this engagement, and describes his survival that night by a 'Blessed rain'. On the second Day of battle at Shiloh, General Grant took direct command of the 14th and 15th Illinois in the counterattack against P.G.T. Beauregard.

After the engagement, General Grant directed that the 14th and 15th Illinois volunteer regiments would remain together for the duration of the Civil War.

As a result of combined losses to both regiments, and since both units refused to receive new recruits, the regiment was consolidated with the 14th Regiment Illinois Volunteer Infantry to form the 14th and 15th Illinois Battalion Infantry on July 1, 1864, and was finally mustered out of service on September 16, 1865, at Fort Leavenworth.

== Total strength and casualties ==
The regiment suffered 6 officers and 81 enlisted men who were killed in action or who died of their wounds and 5 officers and 135 enlisted men who died of disease, for a total of 227 fatalities.

== Commanders ==
- Colonel Thomas J. Turner – Regiment resigned November 2, 1862.
- Colonel George Clark Rogers
- Lt. Colonel William Cam(m) April 7

== See also ==
- List of Illinois Civil War Units
- Illinois in the American Civil War
