= Yorkville School =

- U.S. National Register of Historic Places
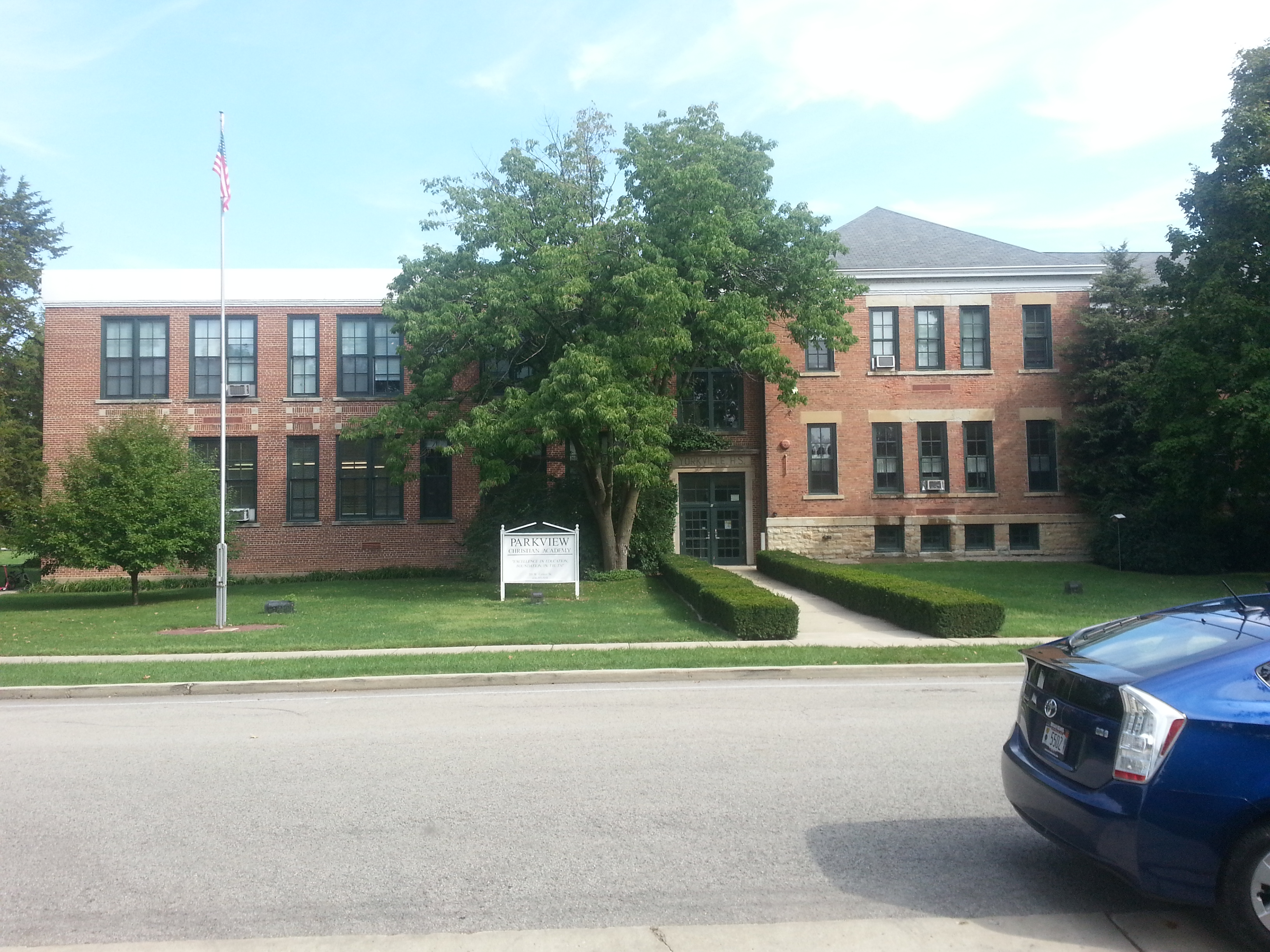

- Location within Illinois Location within the United States
- Location: 201 W. Center St., Yorkville, Illinois
- Coordinates: 41°38′52″N 88°26′53″W
- Area: 4 acres (1.6 ha)
- Built: 1887
- Architect: Hebard, Henry; McKay, R. E.
- Architectural style: Late Victorian, Late 19th And 20th Century Revivals
- NRHP reference No.: 94001600
- Added to NRHP: January 24, 1995

Yorkville School, now known as Parkview Christian Academy, is a historic multi-room school in Yorkville, Illinois, United States.

== History ==
Yorkville, Illinois was founded in 1833 when Earl Adams built a log cabin on the south side of the Fox River. As the area developed, the river split the population into Bristol, north of the river, and Yorkville to the south. Yorkville and Bristol remained separate communities through the 1880s. During that decade, however, Yorkville and Bristol officials agreed to form a single school district.

The Yorkville School was the first large school building in the area and held classes from first grade through high school. Grade school students were largely drawn from the two communities, but high school students would attend from as far as 20 miles (32 km) away. Despite the name, the school was built in what was then still called Bristol. Yorkville residents filed a lawsuit to stop construction, but the district was able to construct the building before the case went to court. It replaced an 1830s one-room schoolhouse on the south side of the river and an 1850s four-room school building on the north side. Bristol was later merged into Yorkville.

A large addition on the east side was built in 1907. Yorkville High School was built in 1959. The old Yorkville School continued to house grade and middle schools for another nine years. In 1968, the school building became home to Waubonsee Community College, who renamed the structure Parkview School. Waubonsee later moved to Sugar Grove, Illinois. The building was still used for grade school classes until 1991.

The building is now used by Parkview Christian Academy as its main campus and houses grade levels Preschool through 5th grade.
