= Plano, Illinois =

- City
- City of Plano
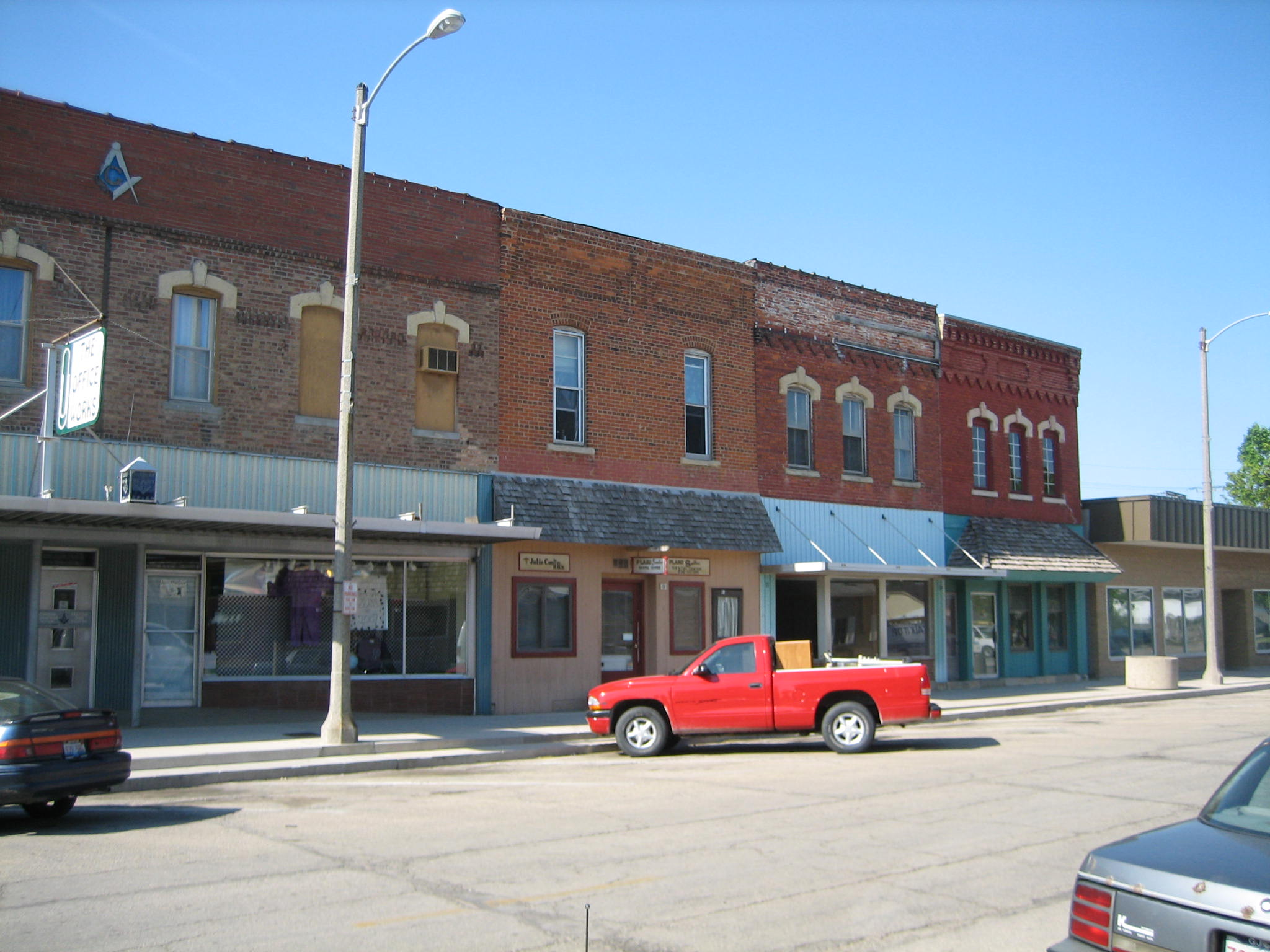
- Buildings in downtown Plano, 2007.

- Flag Seal Logo
- Etymology: From plano, Spanish for plain
- Motto: Birthplace of the Harvester, Home of the Reapers
- Location of Plano in Kendall County, Illinois.

- Location of Illinois in the United States
- Coordinates: 41°40′33″N 88°31′46″W
- Country: United States
- State: Illinois
- County: Kendall
- Township: Little Rock
- Founded: April 10, 1872

Government
  - Mayor: Mike Rennels

Area
  - Total: 9.02 sq mi (23.37 km^{2})
  - Land: 8.98 sq mi (23.26 km^{2})
  - Water: 0.042 sq mi (0.11 km^{2})
- Elevation: 633 ft (193 m)

Population (2020)
  - Total: 11,847
  - Density: 1,319.4/sq mi (509.43/km^{2})
- Time zone: UTC-6 (CST)
  - Summer (DST): UTC-5 (CDT)
- ZIP code: 60545
- Area codes: 630/331
- FIPS code: 17-60352
- GNIS feature ID: 2396223
- Wikimedia Commons: Plano, Illinois
- Website: www.cityofplanoil.com

Plano is a city in Kendall County, Illinois, United States, with a population of 11,847 as of the 2020 census. It is part of the Chicago metropolitan area, being about 55 miles (90 km) from Chicago. The city was home to the Plano Harvester Company in the late 19th century, as well as the Plano Molding Company more recently. In 2011, downtown Plano was used as a set for Man of Steel.

== History ==
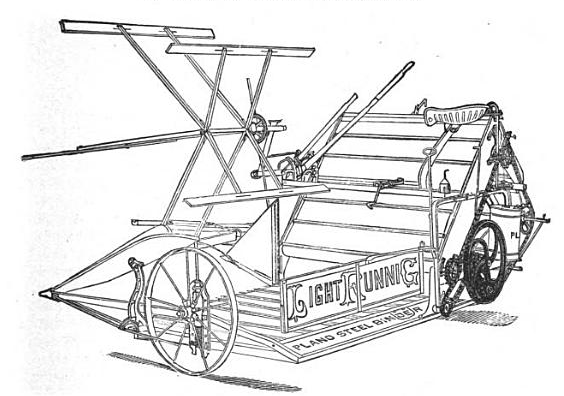
The Plano Binder produced by the Plano Manufacturing Company

In the early 1860s, the Marsh brothers began producing their Marsh Harvester in Plano. From 1863 to the beginning of the twentieth century the Plano Manufacturing Company, as it became known, provided the foundation for Plano's development. Because of this, Plano High School has adopted the reaper as its mascot.

Plano was the one-time headquarters for the Reorganized Church of Jesus Christ of Latter Day Saints. Joseph Smith III, son of slain LDS movement founder Joseph Smith Jr., moved to Plano in 1866 and ran the church's printing operation from there. As the schism with the Utah branch of the Latter Day Saints deepened, he moved with the church headquarters to Lamoni, Iowa in 1880 to be closer to what the Community of Christ believed to be the true church headquarters at Temple Lot in Missouri rather than in Utah.

Community development has been centered around a strong agricultural setting, with the only inhabitants of the area before its incorporation being the owners of grist mills. This development was supported by the city's location along US Route 34 and the Illinois Zephyr Amtrak passenger rail service.

The Plano Molding Company, manufacturer of fishing tackle equipment as well as other plastic domestic containment units, has its headquarters in Plano. Both of its original factories within Plano are still in operation, but the main bulk of production is now in nearby cities Sandwich and Mendota.

Plano and Sandwich have developed a sibling-like relationship. Both deeply agricultural cities are situated along a major trading route and rail artery. The two cities' high schools have developed a rivalry that has become known to the local press as the "War on 34", due to their location along US Route 34.

In the early twenty-first century, multiple new housing developments were constructed in Plano. Due to the following economic downturn, however, many of the houses in both the new developments and older parts of town have experienced foreclosures. Nonetheless, Waubonsee Community College opened a satellite campus in Plano in late 2011.

In the summer of 2011, the City of Plano was used for exterior filming for the Superman movie, Man of Steel. Various farms around the city were also used with one being used for the Kent family farm, and the downtown area was remodeled and turned into a set for downtown Smallville. Other areas used for filming were nearby, and part of IL 56, north of Sugar Grove was shut down for two days for filming despite being closed for "Road Repair". Plano declared itself Smallville during the filming. Signs have been erected at either end of town, as well as on the end of one building on Main Street, proclaiming a similar declaration. Additionally, a "Smallville Superfest" was organized the following summer, and has since been held annually in August.

=== The Farnsworth House ===
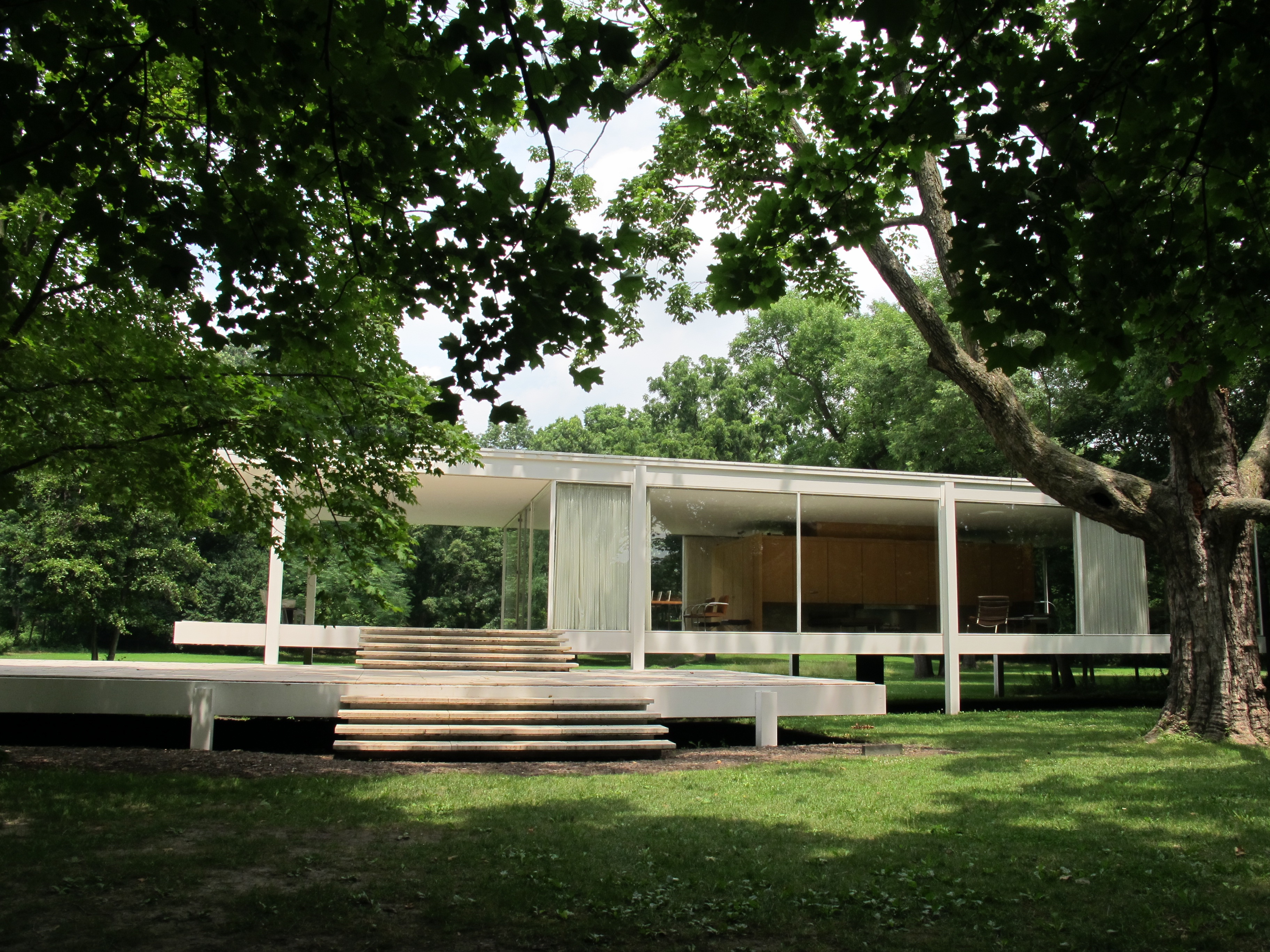
The Farnsworth House in July 2011

Master Architect Ludwig Mies van der Rohe had worked on a retreat for Dr. Edith Farnsworth, a doctor from Chicago, whose complicated relationship with the architect soured the project. Cost overruns as well as questions on the house's actual usefulness led to a lawsuit between the two parties, with van der Rohe winning the suit. In later years, the County Board decided to buy some of Farnsworth's land in order to straighten Fox River Drive (Ben Street in Plano), which would need a new bridge as well. Farnsworth pleaded her case to the County Board, citing evidence that the Board would be doing construction on an old Indian Site, but to no avail. The road was straightened and the new bridge built; however, to this day, the old bridge piers are still visible. Around the same time, Silver Springs State Park and Wildlife Area was designated, down the road and across the river from Farnsworth's house, forever protecting the land from development.

== Geography ==
According to the 2021 census gazetteer files, Plano has a total area of 9.02 square miles (23.36 km^{2}), of which 8.98 square miles (23.26 km^{2}) (or 99.52%) is land and 0.04 square miles (0.10 km^{2}) (or 0.48%) is water.

== Demographics ==
Historical population
Census	Pop.	Note	%±
1880	1,782		—
1890	1,825		2.4%
1900	1,684		−7.7%
1910	1,627		−3.4%
1920	1,473		−9.5%
1930	1,785		21.2%
1940	1,930		8.1%
1950	2,154		11.6%
1960	3,343		55.2%
1970	4,664		39.5%
1980	4,875		4.5%
1990	5,104		4.7%
2000	5,633		10.4%
2010	10,856		92.7%
2020	11,847		9.1%
U.S. Decennial Census

=== 2020 census ===
As of the 2020 census, Plano had a population of 11,847. There were 3,863 households in the city. The 2020 profile reported 2,520 families residing in the city. The population density was 1,313.12 inhabitants per square mile (507.00/km^{2}), and there were 4,035 housing units at an average density of 447.24 per square mile (172.68/km^{2}).

There were 3,863 households in Plano, of which 45.8% had children under the age of 18 living in them. Of all households, 52.0% were married-couple households, 15.4% were households with a male householder and no spouse or partner present, and 23.0% were households with a female householder and no spouse or partner present. About 19.7% of all households were made up of individuals and 6.3% had someone living alone who was 65 years of age or older.

There were 4,035 housing units, of which 4.3% were vacant. The homeowner vacancy rate was 2.0% and the rental vacancy rate was 4.7%.

The median age was 32.7 years. 29.1% of residents were under the age of 18 and 9.0% of residents were 65 years of age or older. For every 100 females there were 96.6 males, and for every 100 females age 18 and over there were 95.3 males age 18 and over.

98.5% of residents lived in urban areas, while 1.5% lived in rural areas.

Racial composition as of the 2020 census
Race	Number	Percent
White	6,755	57.0%
Black or African American	885	7.5%
American Indian and Alaska Native	106	0.9%
Asian	213	1.8%
Native Hawaiian and Other Pacific Islander	7	0.1%
Some other race	2,022	17.1%
Two or more races	1,859	15.7%
Hispanic or Latino (of any race)	4,482	37.8%

=== Income and poverty ===
The median income for a household in the city was $79,113, and the median income for a family was $82,234. Males had a median income of $49,375 versus $32,766 for females. The per capita income for the city was $29,648. About 11.6% of families and 8.5% of the population were below the poverty line, including 8.2% of those under age 18 and 14.2% of those age 65 or over.

== Culture ==
=== Media ===
In 1974, Plano residents Larry and Pam Nelson founded Nelson Multimedia, Inc. Its first radio station was 107.1 WSPY-FM. WSPY-FM broadcasts an adult contemporary format, while its sister station 1480 WDYS (which is licensed in nearby Geneva, but is broadcast out of Plano) broadcasts an adult standards format. WSPY-FM also covers local sports and news.

In addition to the AM and FM stations, Nelson Multimedia's Plano broadcast center also broadcasts a low-power television station, WSPY-TV on analog channel 30 and digital channel 35. WSPY-TV currently broadcasts local events, such as sports, city council meetings, and musical events.

Plano news is covered by local newspapers, including:

- The Plano Record
- The Kendall County Record
- Valley Life (formerly the Valley Free Press)
- The Beacon-News

=== Film ===
Plano has been the home of at least two films, the most recent being the Superman film, Man of Steel, where downtown Plano was a stand-in for Superman's hometown of Smallville, Kansas. The other film was Witless Protection, a film starring Jennie McCarthy and Larry the Cable Guy, which used the area around Plano as the site of Larry's character's hometown, and the Plano Train Station stood in for the Town Hall and Jail.

Plano was also the filming location for the music video for "Nowadays" by Lil Skies and Landon Cube.

== Education ==
Plano is served by Plano C.U.S.D. 88. The district consists of three elementary schools, P.H. Miller Elementary offers Pre-K-1st grade, Centennial Elementary offers 2nd and 3rd grade, and Emily G Johns Elementary which offers 4th-6th grade, as well as Plano Middle School, and Plano High School.

== Notable people ==
- Arthur E. Andersen, founder of the Arthur Andersen accounting firm; born in Plano (1885)
- Cole Bennett, founder of Lyrical Lemonade, grew up in Plano
- William Deering, businessman and philanthropist; moved to Plano in 1850
- Harry J. Haiselden, surgeon; born in Plano (1870)
- Dennis Hastert, former U.S. Speaker of the House, and convicted felon, lived in Plano
- Trey Kerby, basketball blogger and NBA TV host; grew up in Plano
- Lewis M. Long, U.S. congressman; attended Plano High School
- Eduardo Lucero, fashion designer; lived in Plano from age 7 to 17
- Lewis Steward, Plano town founder, U.S. congressman; businessman and philanthropist; Co-founder of Marsh, Steward & Company;

== See also ==
- Albert H. Sears House
- Farnsworth House (Plano, Illinois)
- Plano (Amtrak station)
- Plano Hotel
- Plano Stone Church
