= Afton Township, DeKalb County, Illinois =

Afton Township
- Township
- Location in DeKalb County

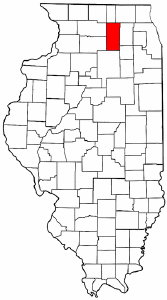
- DeKalb County's location in Illinois
- Coordinates: 41°51′05″N 88°46′41″W
- Country: United States
- State: Illinois
- County: DeKalb
- Established: February 18, 1856

Government
  - Supervisor: Randall J. Bourdages

Area
  - Total: 35.16 sq mi (91.1 km^{2})
  - Land: 35.11 sq mi (90.9 km^{2})
  - Water: 0.06 sq mi (0.16 km^{2}) 0.17%
- Elevation: 889 ft (271 m)

Population (2020)
  - Total: 901
  - Density: 25.7/sq mi (9.91/km^{2})
- Time zone: UTC-6 (CST)
  - Summer (DST): UTC-5 (CDT)
- ZIP codes: 60115, 60556
- FIPS code: 17-037-00386
- Website: aftontownship.org

Afton Township is one of nineteen townships in DeKalb County, Illinois, USA. As of the 2020 census, its population was 901 and it contained 384 housing units.

== History ==
Afton Township was formed from portions of DeKalb Township and Clinton Township on February 18, 1856. The township derives its name from the poem Sweet Afton by Robert Burns.

== Geography ==
According to the 2010 census, the township has a total area of 35.16 square miles (91.1 km^{2}), of which 35.11 square miles (90.9 km^{2}) (or 99.86%) is land and 0.06 square miles (0.16 km^{2}) (or 0.17%) is water.

=== Cities, towns, villages ===
- Dekalb (partial)

=== Unincorporated towns ===
- Afton Center at 41.849196°N 88.773696°W
- Elva at 41.864196°N 88.776197°W
- McGirr at 41.817529°N 88.802308°W

=== Cemeteries ===
- Afton Center Cemetery.

=== Airports and landing strips ===
- Jack W Watson Airport
- Walter Airport

== Demographics ==
As of the 2020 census there were 901 people, 234 households, and 194 families residing in the township. The population density was 25.62 inhabitants per square mile (9.89/km^{2}). There were 384 housing units at an average density of 10.92 per square mile (4.22/km^{2}). The racial makeup of the township was 84.91% White, 5.44% African American, 0.22% Native American, 0.89% Asian, 0.00% Pacific Islander, 2.00% from other races, and 6.55% from two or more races. Hispanic or Latino of any race were 7.21% of the population.

There were 234 households, out of which 8.50% had children under the age of 18 living with them, 55.13% were married couples living together, 23.08% had a female householder with no spouse present, and 17.09% were non-families. 7.70% of all households were made up of individuals, and 0.00% had someone living alone who was 65 years of age or older. The average household size was 3.18 and the average family size was 3.39.

The township's age distribution consisted of 5.8% under the age of 18, 31.9% from 18 to 24, 30.3% from 25 to 44, 21.2% from 45 to 64, and 10.8% who were 65 years of age or older. The median age was 30.5 years. For every 100 females, there were 101.1 males. For every 100 females age 18 and over, there were 101.4 males.

The median income for a household in the township was $103,375, and the median income for a family was $92,500. Males had a median income of $54,583 versus $18,304 for females. The per capita income for the township was $32,795. About 9.8% of families and 8.9% of the population were below the poverty line, including none of those under age 18 and 6.3% of those age 65 or over.

Historical population
Census	Pop.	Note	%±
1930	633		—
1940	578		−8.7%
1950	591		2.2%
1960	615		4.1%
1970	708		15.1%
1980	605		−14.5%
1990	665		9.9%
2000	640		−3.8%
2010	861		34.5%
2020	901		4.6%
US Decennial Census

== School districts ==
- DeKalb Community Unit School District 428
- Hinckley-Big Rock Community Unit School District 429
- Indian Creek Community Unit School District 425

== Political districts ==
- Illinois's 14th congressional district
- State House District 70
- State Senate District 35
