= Illinois's 11th congressional district =

U.S. House district for Illinois

Coordinates: 41°38′34″N 88°08′45″W

- Interactive map of district boundaries since January 3, 2023
- Representative: Bill Foster; D–Naperville
- Area: 928.6 mi^{2} (2,405 km^{2})
- Distribution: 99.7% urban; 0.3% rural
- Population (2025): 765,627
- Median household income: $114,879
- Ethnicity: 63.0% White; 18.9% Hispanic; 8.4% Asian; 6.0% Black; 3.4% Two or more races; 0.5% other
- Cook PVI: D+6

The 11th congressional district of Illinois is represented by Democrat Bill Foster.

From 1865 to 1867, the district included Bureau, LaSalle, Livingston and Woodford counties. From 1901 until 1947 the 11th congressional district included Kane, DuPage, McHenry and Will Counties. Following the Congressional Apportionment Act of 1947, the district covered a portion of Cook County and the far northwest side of Chicago roughly centered on Norwood Park. The district was not changed by 1951's redistricting. In 1961, the district was widened westward to the Des Plaines River and east into parts of Lincoln Square. The district covered the northwest side of Chicago until the early 1990s when it moved closer to its current area, encompassing most of LaSalle and Grundy Counties, the southern part of Will County, the northern part of Kankakee County and a small portion of southeastern Cook County along the Indiana state line. The Illinois Congressional Reapportionment Act of 2001 (10 ILCS 76) defined its boundaries following the 2000 U.S. census.

Following the 2010 U.S. census the district includes Joliet in Will County, parts of Naperville in southern DuPage County, parts of Belvidere in Boone County, and Aurora in Kane County. It includes the Argonne National Laboratory. The congressional district covers parts of Boone, Cook, Du Page, Kane, Kendall and Will counties, as of the 2011 redistricting which followed the 2010 census. All or parts of Aurora, Belvidere, Bolingbrook, Darien, Joliet, Montgomery, Naperville, Lisle, Downers Grove, New Lenox, Shorewood and Woodridge are included. The representatives for these districts were elected in the 2012 primary and general elections, and the boundaries became effective on January 3, 2013.

== Composition ==
For the 118th and successive Congresses (based on redistricting following the 2020 census), the district contains all or portions of the following counties, townships, and municipalities:

Boone County (6)

Belvidere (part, also 16th), Belvidere Township (part, also 16th), Bonus Township, Flora Township (part, also 16th), Poplar Grove (part, also 16th), Spring Township

Cook County (4)

Lemont (part, also 1st; shared with Will County), Lemont Township (part, also 1st), Palos Park (part, also 6th), Willow Springs (part, shared with Cook County)

DeKalb County (5)

Genoa, Genoa Township, Kingston, Kingston Township, Sycamore Township (part, also 14th)

DuPage County (13)

Aurora (part, also 14th; shared with Kane, Kendall, and Will counties), Burr Ridge (part, also 6th; shared with Cook County), Darien (part, also 6th; shared with Will County), Downers Grove (part, also 6th), Downers Grove Township (part, also 6th), Lisle (part, also 6th), Lisle Township (part, also 6th), Naperville (part, also 14th; shared with Will County), Naperville Township, Warrenville (part, also 3rd), Willow Springs (part, shared with Cook County), Winfield Township (part, also 3rd), Woodridge

Kane County (29)

Aurora (part, also 14th; shared with DuPage, Kendall, and Will counties), Aurora Township (part, also 14th), Batavia, Batavia Township, Blackberry Township, Burlington, Burlington Township, Campton Hills, Campton Township, Elburn, Elgin (part, also 8th), Geneva (part, also 8th), Geneva Township (part, also 8th), Hampshire (part, also 8th), Hampshire Township, Huntley (part, also 8th; shared with McHenry County), Kaneville, Kaneville Township, Lily Lake, Maple Park (part, also 14th; shared with DeKalb County), North Aurora, Pingree Grove (part, also 8th), Plato Township, Rutland Township (part, also 8th), St. Charles (part, also 8th), St. Charles Township (part, also 8th), Sugar Grove, Virgil, Virgil Township

Lake County (6)

Fremont Township (part, also 10th), Island Lake (part, also 9th; shared with McHenry County), Lakemoor (part, also 10th; shared with McHenry County), Volo (part, also 10th), Wauconda (part, also 9th), Wauconda Township (part, also 9th)

McHenry County (26)

Algonquin (part, also 9th), Bull Valley, Coral Township, Crystal Lake (part, also 9th), Dorr Township, Grafton Township, Greenwood Township (part, also 10th), Hartland Township (part, also 16th; includes Hartland CDP), Holiday Hills, Huntley (part, also 9th; shared with Kane County), McCullom Lake (part, also 10th), Lake in the Hills (part, also 9th), Lakemoor (part, also 10th; shared with Lake County), Lakewood, Marengo, Marengo Township, McHenry (part, also 10th), McHenry Township (part, also 10th), Nunda Township, Oakwood Hills, Prairie Grove, Port Barrington (part, also 9th; shared with Lake County), Riley Township, Seneca Township, Union, Woodstock

Will County (5)

Bolingbrook (part, also 14th), DuPage Township (part, also 14th), Lemont (part, also 1st; shared with Cook County), Lockport Township (part, also 1st and 14th), Romeoville (part, also 14th)

== Recent election results from statewide races ==
Year	Office	Results
2008	President	Obama 56% - 43%
2012	President	Obama 51% - 49%
2016	President	Clinton 52% - 41%
2016	Senate	Duckworth 48% - 45%
2016	Comptroller (Spec.)	Munger 51% - 42%
2018	Governor	Pritzker 48% - 46%
2018	Attorney General	Raoul 50% - 47%
2018	Secretary of State	White 65% - 32%
2018	Comptroller	Mendoza 54% - 43%
2018	Treasurer	Frerichs 51% - 45%
2020	President	Biden 57% - 41%
2020	Senate	Durbin 53% - 42%
2022	Senate	Duckworth 56% - 42%
2022	Governor	Pritzker 55% - 42%
2022	Attorney General	Raoul 54% - 43%
2022	Secretary of State	Giannoulias 54% - 44%
2022	Comptroller	Mendoza 56% - 42%
2022	Treasurer	Frerichs 53% - 45%
2024	President	Harris 54% - 43%

== List of members representing the district ==
Member	Party	Years	Cong ress	Notes	District location
District created March 4, 1863
James C. Robinson (Marshall)	Democratic	March 4, 1863 – March 3, 1865	38th	Redistricted from the 7th district and re-elected in 1862. Retired to run for Governor of Illinois.	
Samuel S. Marshall (McLeansboro)	Democratic	March 4, 1865 – March 3, 1873	39th 40th 41st 42nd	Elected in 1864. Re-elected in 1866. Re-elected in 1868. Re-elected in 1870. Redistricted to the 19th district.	
Robert M. Knapp (Jerseyville)	Democratic	March 4, 1873 – March 3, 1875	43rd	Elected in 1872. Retired.	
Scott Wike (Pittsfield)	Democratic	March 4, 1875 – March 3, 1877	44th	Elected in 1874. Retired.	
Robert M. Knapp (Jerseyville)	Democratic	March 4, 1877 – March 3, 1879	45th	Elected again in 1876. Retired.	
James W. Singleton (Quincy)	Democratic	March 4, 1879 – March 3, 1883	46th 47th	Elected in 1878. Re-elected in 1880. Redistricted to the 12th district.	
William Neece (Macomb)	Democratic	March 4, 1883 – March 3, 1887	48th 49th	Elected in 1882. Re-elected in 1884. Lost re-election.	
William Gest (Rock Island)	Republican	March 4, 1887 – March 3, 1891	50th 51st	Elected in 1886. Re-elected in 1888. Lost re-election.	
Benjamin T. Cable (Rock Island)	Democratic	March 4, 1891 – March 3, 1893	52nd	Elected in 1890. Retired.	
Benjamin F. Marsh (Warsaw)	Republican	March 4, 1893 – March 3, 1895	53rd	Redistricted from the 10th district and re-elected in 1892. Redistricted to the 15th district.	
Walter Reeves (Streator)	Republican	March 4, 1895 – March 3, 1903	54th 55th 56th 57th	Elected in 1894. Re-elected in 1896. Re-elected in 1898. Re-elected in 1900. Retired.	1895–1903 Bureau, LaSalle, Livingston and Woodford counties
Howard M. Snapp (Joliet)	Republican	March 4, 1903 – March 3, 1911	58th 59th 60th 61st	Elected in 1902. Re-elected in 1904. Re-elected in 1906. Re-elected in 1908. Retired.	1903–1949 Kane, DuPage, McHenry and Will counties
Ira C. Copley (Aurora)	Republican	March 4, 1911 – March 3, 1915	62nd 63rd 64th 65th 66th 67th	Elected in 1910. Re-elected in 1912. Re-elected in 1914. Re-elected in 1916. Re-elected in 1918. Re-elected in 1920. Retired.	1903–1949 Kane, DuPage, McHenry and Will counties
Ira C. Copley (Aurora)	Progressive	March 4, 1915 – March 3, 1917	62nd 63rd 64th 65th 66th 67th	Elected in 1910. Re-elected in 1912. Re-elected in 1914. Re-elected in 1916. Re-elected in 1918. Re-elected in 1920. Retired.	1903–1949 Kane, DuPage, McHenry and Will counties
Ira C. Copley (Aurora)	Republican	March 4, 1917 – March 3, 1923	62nd 63rd 64th 65th 66th 67th	Elected in 1910. Re-elected in 1912. Re-elected in 1914. Re-elected in 1916. Re-elected in 1918. Re-elected in 1920. Retired.	1903–1949 Kane, DuPage, McHenry and Will counties
Frank Reid (Aurora)	Republican	March 4, 1923 – January 3, 1935	68th 69th 70th 71st 72nd 73rd	Elected in 1922. Re-elected in 1924. Re-elected in 1926. Re-elected in 1928. Re-elected in 1930. Re-elected in 1932. Retired.	1903–1949 Kane, DuPage, McHenry and Will counties
Chauncey Reed (West Chicago)	Republican	January 3, 1935 – January 3, 1949	74th 75th 76th 77th 78th 79th 80th	Elected in 1934. Re-elected in 1936. Re-elected in 1938. Re-elected in 1940. Re-elected in 1942. Re-elected in 1944. Re-elected in 1946. Redistricted to the 14th district.	1903–1949 Kane, DuPage, McHenry and Will counties
Chester Chesney (Chicago)	Democratic	January 3, 1949 – January 3, 1951	81st	Elected in 1948. Lost re-election.	
Timothy P. Sheehan (Chicago)	Republican	January 3, 1951 – January 3, 1959	82nd 83rd 84th 85th	Elected in 1950. Re-elected in 1952. Re-elected in 1954. Re-elected in 1956. Lost re-election.	
Roman Pucinski (Chicago)	Democratic	January 3, 1959 – January 3, 1973	86th 87th 88th 89th 90th 91st 92nd	Elected in 1958. Re-elected in 1960. Re-elected in 1962. Re-elected in 1964. Re-elected in 1966. Re-elected in 1968. Re-elected in 1970. Retired to run for U.S. Senator.	
Frank Annunzio (Chicago)	Democratic	January 3, 1973 – January 3, 1993	93rd 94th 95th 96th 97th 98th 99th 100th 101st 102nd	Redistricted from the 7th district and re-elected in 1972. Re-elected in 1974. Re-elected in 1976. Re-elected in 1978. Re-elected in 1980. Re-elected in 1982. Re-elected in 1984. Re-elected in 1986. Re-elected in 1988. Re-elected in 1990. Retired.	
George E. Sangmeister (Mokena)	Democratic	January 3, 1993 – January 3, 1995	103rd	Redistricted from the 4th district and re-elected in 1992. Retired.	
Jerry Weller (Morris)	Republican	January 3, 1995 – January 3, 2009	104th 105th 106th 107th 108th 109th 110th	Elected in 1994. Re-elected in 1996. Re-elected in 1998. Re-elected in 2000. Re-elected in 2002. Re-elected in 2004. Re-elected in 2006. Retired.	
Jerry Weller (Morris)	Republican	January 3, 1995 – January 3, 2009	104th 105th 106th 107th 108th 109th 110th	Elected in 1994. Re-elected in 1996. Re-elected in 1998. Re-elected in 2000. Re-elected in 2002. Re-elected in 2004. Re-elected in 2006. Retired.	2003–2013
Debbie Halvorson (Crete)	Democratic	January 3, 2009 – January 3, 2011	111th	Elected in 2008. Lost re-election.	2003–2013
Adam Kinzinger (Manteno)	Republican	January 3, 2011 – January 3, 2013	112th	Elected in 2010. Redistricted to the 16th district.	2003–2013
Bill Foster (Naperville)	Democratic	January 3, 2013 – present	113th 114th 115th 116th 117th 118th 119th	Elected in 2012. Re-elected in 2014. Re-elected in 2016. Re-elected in 2018. Re-elected in 2020. Re-elected in 2022. Re-elected in 2024. Re-elected in 2026.	2013–2023
Bill Foster (Naperville)	Democratic	January 3, 2013 – present	113th 114th 115th 116th 117th 118th 119th	Elected in 2012. Re-elected in 2014. Re-elected in 2016. Re-elected in 2018. Re-elected in 2020. Re-elected in 2022. Re-elected in 2024. Re-elected in 2026.	2023–present

== Elections ==
=== 2012 ===
Illinois's 11th congressional district, 2012
Party	Candidate	Votes	%
Democratic	Bill Foster	148,928	58.6
Republican	Judy Biggert (incumbent)	105,348	41.4
Independent	Chris Michel (write-in)	19	0.0
Total votes		254,295	100.0
Democratic gain from Republican			

=== 2014 ===
Illinois's 11th congressional district, 2014
Party	Candidate	Votes	%
Democratic	Bill Foster (incumbent)	93,436	53.5
Republican	Darlene Senger	81,335	46.5
Independent	Connor Vlakancic (write-in)	1	0.0
Total votes		174,772	100.0
Democratic hold			

=== 2016 ===
Illinois's 11th congressional district, 2016
Party	Candidate	Votes	%
Democratic	Bill Foster (incumbent)	166,578	60.4
Republican	Tonia Khouri	108,995	39.6
Total votes		275,573	100.0
Democratic hold			

=== 2018 ===
Illinois's 11th congressional district, 2018
Party	Candidate	Votes	%
Democratic	Bill Foster (incumbent)	145,407	63.8
Republican	Nick Stella	82,358	36.2
Total votes		227,765	100.0
Democratic hold			

=== 2020 ===
Illinois's 11th congressional district, 2020
Party	Candidate	Votes	%	±%
Democratic	Bill Foster (incumbent)	194,557	63.30	−0.54%
Republican	Rick Laib	112,807	36.70	+0.54%
Write-in		13	0.00	N/A
Total votes		307,377	100.0	
Democratic hold				

=== 2022 ===
Illinois's 11th congressional district, 2022
Party	Candidate	Votes	%
Democratic	Bill Foster (incumbent)	149,172	56.45
Republican	Catalina Lauf	115,069	43.55
Total votes		264,241	100.0
Democratic hold			

=== 2024 ===
Illinois's 11th congressional district, 2024
Party	Candidate	Votes	%	±%
Democratic	Bill Foster (incumbent)	199,825	55.56	−0.91%
Republican	Jerry Evans	159,630	44.38	+0.83%
Write-in		229	0.08	N/A
Total votes		359,684	100.0	
Democratic hold				

== See also ==
- Illinois's congressional districts
- List of United States congressional districts
