= Milan Township, DeKalb County, Illinois =

Milan Township
- Township
- Location in DeKalb County

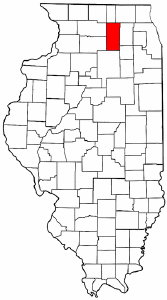
- DeKalb County's location in Illinois
- Coordinates: 41°50′43″N 88°52′37″W
- Country: United States
- State: Illinois
- County: DeKalb
- Established: February 23, 1858

Area
  - Total: 35.24 sq mi (91.3 km^{2})
  - Land: 35.20 sq mi (91.2 km^{2})
  - Water: 0.04 sq mi (0.10 km^{2}) 0.10%
- Elevation: 892 ft (272 m)

Population (2020)
  - Total: 305
  - Density: 8.66/sq mi (3.35/km^{2})
- Time zone: UTC-6 (CST)
  - Summer (DST): UTC-5 (CDT)
- ZIP codes: 60115, 60150, 60530, 60550
- FIPS code: 17-037-48983

Milan Township is one of nineteen townships in DeKalb County, Illinois, USA. As of the 2020 census, its population was 305 and it contained 130 housing units. Milan Township formed from portions of Shabbona Township and Malta Township on February 23, 1858.

== Geography ==
According to the 2021 census gazetteer files, Milan Township has a total area of 35.24 square miles (91.27 km^{2}), of which 35.20 square miles (91.17 km^{2}) (or 99.90%) is land and 0.04 square miles (0.10 km^{2}) (or 0.10%) is water.

=== Airports and landing strips ===
- Diedrich Airport

== Demographics ==
As of the 2020 census there were 305 people, 36 households, and 27 families residing in the township. The population density was 8.66 inhabitants per square mile (3.34/km^{2}). There were 130 housing units at an average density of 3.69 per square mile (1.42/km^{2}). The racial makeup of the township was 88.85% White, 0.33% African American, 0.00% Native American, 0.00% Asian, 0.00% Pacific Islander, 3.61% from other races, and 7.21% from two or more races. Hispanic or Latino of any race were 6.23% of the population.

There were 36 households, out of which 50.00% had children under the age of 18 living with them, 75.00% were married couples living together, none had a female householder with no spouse present, and 25.00% were non-families. 25.00% of all households were made up of individuals, and none had someone living alone who was 65 years of age or older. The average household size was 2.33 and the average family size was 2.78.

The township's age distribution consisted of 16.7% under the age of 18, 10.7% from 18 to 24, 0% from 25 to 44, 72.6% from 45 to 64, and 0.0% who were 65 years of age or older. The median age was 48.2 years. For every 100 females, there were 100.0 males. For every 100 females age 18 and over, there were 105.9 males.

The median income for a household in the township was $131,250. Males had a median income of $91,250 versus $17,222 for females. The per capita income for the township was $48,810. None of the population was below the poverty line.

Historical population
Census	Pop.	Note	%±
1930	593		—
1940	553		−6.7%
1950	494		−10.7%
1960	522		5.7%
1970	436		−16.5%
1980	413		−5.3%
1990	373		−9.7%
2000	388		4.0%
2010	331		−14.7%
2020	305		−7.9%
US Decennial Census

== School districts ==
- DeKalb Community Unit School District 428
- Indian Creek Community Unit District 425

== Political districts ==
- Illinois's 14th congressional district
- State House District 70
- State Senate District 35
