= Malta Township, DeKalb County, Illinois =

Malta Township
- Township
- Location in DeKalb County

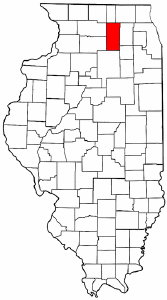
- DeKalb County's location in Illinois
- Coordinates: 41°55′59″N 88°52′58″W
- Country: United States
- State: Illinois
- County: DeKalb
- Established: December, 1858

Area
  - Total: 35.01 sq mi (90.7 km^{2})
  - Land: 34.96 sq mi (90.5 km^{2})
  - Water: 0.06 sq mi (0.16 km^{2}) 0.17%
- Elevation: 920 ft (280 m)

Population (2020)
  - Total: 1,557
  - Density: 44.54/sq mi (17.20/km^{2})
- Time zone: UTC-6 (CST)
  - Summer (DST): UTC-5 (CDT)
- ZIP codes: 60111, 60115, 60150, 61068
- FIPS code: 17-037-46292

Malta Township is one of nineteen townships in DeKalb County, Illinois, USA. As of the 2020 census, its population was 1,557 and it contained 631 housing units. Malta Township was originally formed as Etna Township from a portion of DeKalb Township in September, 1856; it was renamed to Malta Township in December 1858. Kishwaukee College is in this township.

== Geography ==
According to the 2021 census gazetteer files, Malta Township has a total area of 35.01 square miles (90.68 km^{2}), of which 34.96 square miles (90.55 km^{2}) (or 99.83%) is land and 0.06 square miles (0.16 km^{2}) (or 0.17%) is water.

=== Cities, towns, villages ===
- Malta

=== Cemeteries ===
- Hudson
- Malta

=== Airports and landing strips ===
- Hendrickson Flying Service Airport

=== Lakes ===
- Harkness Lake

== Demographics ==
As of the 2020 census there were 1,557 people, 669 households, and 453 families residing in the township. The population density was 44.47 inhabitants per square mile (17.17/km^{2}). There were 631 housing units at an average density of 18.02 per square mile (6.96/km^{2}). The racial makeup of the township was 85.42% White, 2.44% African American, 0.51% Native American, 0.13% Asian, 0.00% Pacific Islander, 4.11% from other races, and 7.39% from two or more races. Hispanic or Latino of any race were 10.28% of the population.

There were 669 households, out of which 34.10% had children under the age of 18 living with them, 54.71% were married couples living together, 7.03% had a female householder with no spouse present, and 32.29% were non-families. 18.80% of all households were made up of individuals, and 5.40% had someone living alone who was 65 years of age or older. The average household size was 2.98 and the average family size was 3.43.

The township's age distribution consisted of 28.1% under the age of 18, 7.9% from 18 to 24, 23.6% from 25 to 44, 25% from 45 to 64, and 15.5% who were 65 years of age or older. The median age was 39.6 years. For every 100 females, there were 118.6 males. For every 100 females age 18 and over, there were 106.8 males.

The median income for a household in the township was $83,229, and the median income for a family was $105,313. Males had a median income of $41,220 versus $37,306 for females. The per capita income for the township was $32,747. About 10.4% of families and 16.6% of the population were below the poverty line, including 22.3% of those under age 18 and 0.6% of those age 65 or over.

Historical population
Census	Pop.	Note	%±
1930	966		—
1940	1,031		6.7%
1950	1,074		4.2%
1960	1,383		28.8%
1970	1,532		10.8%
1980	1,484		−3.1%
1990	1,335		−10.0%
2000	1,430		7.1%
2010	1,608		12.4%
2020	1,557		−3.2%
US Decennial Census

== School districts ==
- DeKalb Community Unit School District 428
- Indian Creek Community Unit District 425

== Political districts ==
- Illinois's 16th congressional district
- State House District 70
- State Senate District 35
