= Shabbona Township, DeKalb County, Illinois =

Shabbona Township
- Township
- Location in DeKalb County

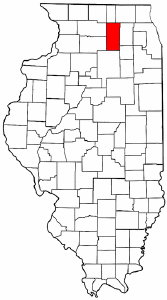
- DeKalb County's location in Illinois
- Coordinates: 41°45′37″N 88°53′04″W
- Country: United States
- State: Illinois
- County: DeKalb
- Established: November 6, 1849

Area
  - Total: 35.20 sq mi (91.2 km^{2})
  - Land: 34.65 sq mi (89.7 km^{2})
  - Water: 0.55 sq mi (1.4 km^{2}) 1.57%
- Elevation: 892 ft (272 m)

Population (2020)
  - Total: 1,344
  - Density: 38.79/sq mi (14.98/km^{2})
- Time zone: UTC-6 (CST)
  - Summer (DST): UTC-5 (CDT)
- ZIP codes: 60518, 60530, 60550, 60556
- FIPS code: 17-037-68835

Shabbona Township is one of nineteen townships in DeKalb County, Illinois, USA. As of the 2020 census, its population was 1,344 and it contained 600 housing units. The township contains the Chief Shabbona Forest Preserve and Shabbona Lake State Park.

== Geography ==
According to the 2021 census gazetteer files, Shabbona Township has a total area of 35.20 square miles (91.17 km^{2}), of which 34.65 square miles (89.74 km^{2}) (or 98.43%) is land and 0.55 square miles (1.42 km^{2}) (or 1.57%) is water. The township is named after the Potawatomi tribal leader, Chief Shabbona.

=== Cities, towns, villages ===
- Lee (partial)
- Shabbona

=== Unincorporated towns ===
- Shabbona Grove at 41.73253°N 88.855641°W

(This list is based on USGS data and may include former settlements.)

=== Cemeteries ===
- Old English
- Smith
- Lee Calvary
- Rose Hill

== Demographics ==
As of the 2020 census there were 1,344 people, 600 households, and 374 families residing in the township. The population density was 38.18 inhabitants per square mile (14.74/km^{2}). There were 600 housing units at an average density of 17.04 per square mile (6.58/km^{2}). The racial makeup of the township was 93.97% White, 0.37% African American, 0.15% Native American, 0.52% Asian, 0.00% Pacific Islander, 0.52% from other races, and 4.46% from two or more races. Hispanic or Latino of any race were 4.17% of the population.

There were 600 households, out of which 23.00% had children under the age of 18 living with them, 49.33% were married couples living together, 5.83% had a female householder with no spouse present, and 37.67% were non-families. 34.20% of all households were made up of individuals, and 21.30% had someone living alone who was 65 years of age or older. The average household size was 2.36 and the average family size was 3.01.

The township's age distribution consisted of 15.1% under the age of 18, 12.8% from 18 to 24, 18% from 25 to 44, 30.2% from 45 to 64, and 24.0% who were 65 years of age or older. The median age was 50.4 years. For every 100 females, there were 105.2 males. For every 100 females age 18 and over, there were 97.0 males.

The median income for a household in the township was $67,415, and the median income for a family was $91,250. Males had a median income of $39,688 versus $26,406 for females. The per capita income for the township was $33,949. About 2.9% of families and 6.6% of the population were below the poverty line, including 7.3% of those under age 18 and 5.4% of those age 65 or over.

Historical population
Census	Pop.	Note	%±
1930	1,325		—
1940	1,291		−2.6%
1950	1,372		6.3%
1960	1,345		−2.0%
1970	1,354		0.7%
1980	1,372		1.3%
1990	1,379		0.5%
2000	1,449		5.1%
2010	1,453		0.3%
2020	1,344		−7.5%
US Decennial Census

== School districts ==
- Indian Creek Community Unit District 425

== Political districts ==
- Illinois's 14th congressional district
- State House District 70
- State Senate District 35
