= Mayfield Township, DeKalb County, Illinois =

Mayfield Township
- Township
- Location in DeKalb County

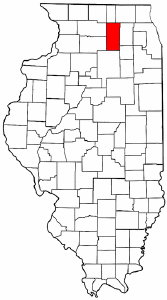
- DeKalb County's location in Illinois
- Coordinates: 42°01′11″N 88°46′23″W
- Country: United States
- State: Illinois
- County: DeKalb
- Established: November 20, 1850

Area
  - Total: 35.15 sq mi (91.0 km^{2})
  - Land: 34.93 sq mi (90.5 km^{2})
  - Water: 0.22 sq mi (0.57 km^{2}) 0.63%
- Elevation: 866 ft (264 m)

Population (2020)
  - Total: 872
  - Density: 25.0/sq mi (9.64/km^{2})
- Time zone: UTC-6 (CST)
  - Summer (DST): UTC-5 (CDT)
- ZIP codes: 60111, 60115, 60145, 60146, 60178
- FIPS code: 17-037-47696

Mayfield Township is one of nineteen townships in DeKalb County, Illinois, USA. As of the 2020 census, its population was 872 and it contained 409 housing units. Mayfield Township was renamed from Liberty Township on November 20, 1850.

== Geography ==
According to the 2021 census gazetteer files, Mayfield Township has a total area of 35.15 square miles (91.04 km^{2}), of which 34.93 square miles (90.47 km^{2}) (or 99.37%) is land and 0.22 square miles (0.57 km^{2}) (or 0.63%) is water.

=== Unincorporated towns ===
- Clare at 42.016139°N 88.829259°W
- Five Points at 42.002529°N 88.740367°W
- Wilkinson at 42.006695°N 88.782868°W

=== Cemeteries ===
- Ault Road
- Mayfield

=== Airports and landing strips ===
- Anderson Airport
- Marx V Stott Airport

== Demographics ==
As of the 2020 census there were 872 people, 309 households, and 116 families residing in the township. The population density was 24.81 inhabitants per square mile (9.58/km^{2}). There were 409 housing units at an average density of 11.64 per square mile (4.49/km^{2}). The racial makeup of the township was 86.47% White, 1.03% African American, 0.69% Native American, 1.26% Asian, 0.00% Pacific Islander, 3.10% from other races, and 7.45% from two or more races. Hispanic or Latino of any race were 8.26% of the population.

There were 309 households, out of which 6.80% had children under the age of 18 living with them, 34.63% were married couples living together, none had a female householder with no spouse present, and 62.46% were non-families. 34.60% of all households were made up of individuals, and 16.50% had someone living alone who was 65 years of age or older. The average household size was 2.08 and the average family size was 2.59.

The township's age distribution consisted of 8.7% under the age of 18, none from 18 to 24, 52.9% from 25 to 44, 14% from 45 to 64, and 24.4% who were 65 years of age or older. The median age was 34.7 years. For every 100 females, there were 151.6 males. For every 100 females age 18 and over, there were 164.9 males.

The median income for a household in the township was $85,081. Males had a median income of $31,667 versus $37,031 for females. The per capita income for the township was $33,298. No families and 4.3% of the population were below the poverty line, including none of those under age 18 and 10.2% of those age 65 or over.

Historical population
Census	Pop.	Note	%±
1930	655		—
1940	682		4.1%
1950	648		−5.0%
1960	682		5.2%
1970	766		12.3%
1980	769		0.4%
1990	741		−3.6%
2000	785		5.9%
2010	929		18.3%
2020	872		−6.1%
US Decennial Census

== School districts ==
- Genoa-Kingston Community Unit School District 424
- Hiawatha Community Unit School District 426
- Sycamore Community Unit School District 427

== Political districts ==
- Illinois's 16th congressional district
- State House District 70
- State Senate District 35
