= Victor Township, DeKalb County, Illinois =

Victor Township
- Township
- Location in DeKalb County

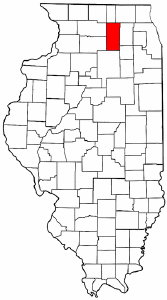
- DeKalb County's location in Illinois
- Coordinates: 41°40′02″N 88°45′58″W
- Country: United States
- State: Illinois
- County: DeKalb
- Established: About 1853

Area
  - Total: 32.82 sq mi (85.0 km^{2})
  - Land: 32.75 sq mi (84.8 km^{2})
  - Water: 0.07 sq mi (0.18 km^{2}) 0.20%
- Elevation: 732 ft (223 m)

Population (2020)
  - Total: 275
  - Density: 8.40/sq mi (3.24/km^{2})
- Time zone: UTC-6 (CST)
  - Summer (DST): UTC-5 (CDT)
- ZIP codes: 60531, 60552, 60556
- FIPS code: 17-037-77798

Victor Township is one of nineteen townships in DeKalb County, Illinois, USA. As of the 2020 census, its population was 275 and it contained 125 housing units. Victor Township was formed from Clinton Township around 1853.

== Geography ==
According to the 2021 census gazetteer files, Victor Township has a total area of 32.82 square miles (85.00 km^{2}), of which 32.75 square miles (84.82 km^{2}) (or 99.80%) is land and 0.07 square miles (0.18 km^{2}) (or 0.20%) is water.

=== Cemeteries ===
- Victor Cemetery

=== Airports and landing strips ===
- Dewey

== Demographics ==
As of the 2020 census there were 275 people, 124 households, and 106 families residing in the township. The population density was 8.38 inhabitants per square mile (3.24/km^{2}). There were 125 housing units at an average density of 3.81 per square mile (1.47/km^{2}). The racial makeup of the township was 89.09% White, 0.73% African American, 0.36% Native American, 0.36% Asian, 0.00% Pacific Islander, 2.18% from other races, and 7.27% from two or more races. Hispanic or Latino of any race were 7.64% of the population.

There were 124 households, out of which 40.30% had children under the age of 18 living with them, 51.61% were married couples living together, 12.10% had a female householder with no spouse present, and 14.52% were non-families. 14.50% of all households were made up of individuals, and 3.20% had someone living alone who was 65 years of age or older. The average household size was 2.94 and the average family size was 2.86.

The township's age distribution consisted of 26.1% under the age of 18, 2.2% from 18 to 24, 33.6% from 25 to 44, 22.4% from 45 to 64, and 15.7% who were 65 years of age or older. The median age was 38.3 years. For every 100 females, there were 124.7 males. For every 100 females age 18 and over, there were 96.4 males.

The median income for a household in the township was $84,444, and the median income for a family was $49,815. Males had a median income of $48,981 versus $38,304 for females. The per capita income for the township was $33,137. About 6.6% of families and 14.3% of the population were below the poverty line, including 41.1% of those under age 18 and none of those age 65 or over.

Historical population
| Census | Pop. | Note | %± |
|---|---|---|---|
| 1930 | 566 | | — |
| 1940 | 523 | | −7.6% |
| 1950 | 548 | | 4.8% |
| 1960 | 479 | | −12.6% |
| 1970 | 437 | | −8.8% |
| 1980 | 448 | | 2.5% |
| 1990 | 413 | | −7.8% |
| 2000 | 380 | | −8.0% |
| 2010 | 299 | | −21.3% |
| 2020 | 275 | | −8.0% |
US Decennial Census

== School districts ==
- Indian Creek Community Unit District 425
- Leland Community Unit School District 1
- Somonauk Community Unit School District 432

== Political districts ==
- Illinois's 14th congressional district
- State House District 70
- State Senate District 35
