= Kingston Township, DeKalb County, Illinois =

Kingston Township
- Township
- Location in DeKalb County

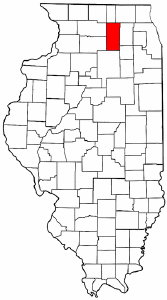
- DeKalb County's location in Illinois
- Coordinates: 42°06′41″N 88°45′55″W
- Country: United States
- State: Illinois
- County: DeKalb
- Established: November 6, 1849

Area
  - Total: 36.10 sq mi (93.5 km^{2})
  - Land: 35.74 sq mi (92.6 km^{2})
  - Water: 0.36 sq mi (0.93 km^{2}) 0.99%
- Elevation: 794 ft (242 m)

Population (2020)
  - Total: 3,492
  - Density: 97.71/sq mi (37.72/km^{2})
- Time zone: UTC-6 (CST)
  - Summer (DST): UTC-5 (CDT)
- ZIP codes: 60135, 60145
- FIPS code: 17-037-40078

Kingston Township is one of nineteen townships in DeKalb County, Illinois, USA. As of the 2020 census, its population was 3,492 and it contained 1,315 housing units.

== Geography ==
According to the 2021 census gazetteer files, Kingston Township has a total area of 36.10 square miles (93.50 km^{2}), of which 35.74 square miles (92.57 km^{2}) (or 99.01%) is land and 0.36 square miles (0.93 km^{2}) (or 0.99%) is water.

=== Cities, towns, villages ===
- Genoa (partial)
- Kingston
- Kirkland (partial)

=== Unincorporated towns ===
- Colvin Park at 42.138080°N 88.783428°W

=== Cemeteries ===
- Kingston
- Lanan
- North Kingston
- Vanderburgh

== Demographics ==
As of the 2020 census there were 3,492 people, 1,191 households, and 873 families residing in the township. The population density was 96.74 inhabitants per square mile (37.35/km^{2}). There were 1,315 housing units at an average density of 36.43 per square mile (14.07/km^{2}). The racial makeup of the township was 85.42% White, 0.83% African American, 0.37% Native American, 0.46% Asian, 0.03% Pacific Islander, 3.69% from other races, and 9.19% from two or more races. Hispanic or Latino of any race were 10.14% of the population.

There were 1,191 households, out of which 33.00% had children under the age of 18 living with them, 58.69% were married couples living together, 8.73% had a female householder with no spouse present, and 26.70% were non-families. 22.40% of all households were made up of individuals, and 6.10% had someone living alone who was 65 years of age or older. The average household size was 2.99 and the average family size was 3.25.

The township's age distribution consisted of 22.9% under the age of 18, 13.3% from 18 to 24, 24.9% from 25 to 44, 28.9% from 45 to 64, and 10.0% who were 65 years of age or older. The median age was 36.6 years. For every 100 females, there were 112.9 males. For every 100 females age 18 and over, there were 102.6 males.

The median income for a household in the township was $88,875, and the median income for a family was $97,321. Males had a median income of $56,710 versus $32,708 for females. The per capita income for the township was $37,635. About 6.5% of families and 10.4% of the population were below the poverty line, including 18.9% of those under age 18 and 7.0% of those age 65 or over.

Historical population
Census	Pop.	Note	%±
1930	868		—
1940	872		0.5%
1950	993		13.9%
1960	1,186		19.4%
1970	1,347		13.6%
1980	1,809		34.3%
1990	1,955		8.1%
2000	2,573		31.6%
2010	3,519		36.8%
2020	3,492		−0.8%
US Decennial Census

== School districts ==
- Belvidere Community Unit School District 100
- Genoa-Kingston Community Unit School District 424
- Hiawatha Community Unit School District 426

== Political districts ==
- Illinois's 16th congressional district
- State House District 69
- State Senate District 35
