= Genoa Township, DeKalb County, Illinois =

Genoa Township
- Township
- Location in DeKalb County

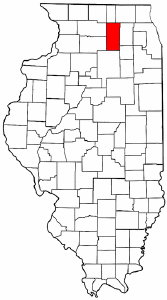
- DeKalb County's location in Illinois
- Coordinates: 42°06′19″N 88°38′35″W
- Country: United States
- State: Illinois
- County: DeKalb
- Established: November 6, 1849

Area
  - Total: 36.14 sq mi (93.6 km^{2})
  - Land: 36.05 sq mi (93.4 km^{2})
  - Water: 0.09 sq mi (0.23 km^{2}) 0.24%
- Elevation: 820 ft (250 m)

Population (2020)
  - Total: 5,527
  - Density: 153.3/sq mi (59.20/km^{2})
- Time zone: UTC-6 (CST)
  - Summer (DST): UTC-5 (CDT)
- ZIP codes: 60135, 60140, 60145, 60152, 60178
- FIPS code: 17-037-28911

Genoa Township is one of nineteen townships in DeKalb County, USA. At the 2020 census, its population was 5,527 and it contained 2,166 housing units.

== History ==
Genoa Township is named after Genoa, New York.

== Geography ==
According to the 2021 census gazetteer files, Genoa Township has a total area of 36.14 square miles (93.60 km^{2}), of which 36.05 square miles (93.37 km^{2}) (or 99.76%) is land and 0.09 square miles (0.23 km^{2}) (or 0.24%) is water.

=== Cities, towns, villages ===
- Genoa (east three-quarters)

=== Unincorporated towns ===
- New Lebanon at 42.098914°N 88.603144°W

=== Cemeteries ===
- Genoa
- Ney

=== Airports and landing strips ===
- Aero Lake Estates Airport
- Ramme Airport
- Richard C Watson Airport

== Demographics ==
As of the 2020 census there were 5,527 people, 2,168 households, and 1,502 families residing in the township. The population density was 152.94 inhabitants per square mile (59.05/km^{2}). There were 2,166 housing units at an average density of 59.94 per square mile (23.14/km^{2}). The racial makeup of the township was 81.76% White, 0.60% African American, 0.45% Native American, 0.63% Asian, 0.00% Pacific Islander, 6.12% from other races, and 10.44% from two or more races. Hispanic or Latino of any race were 16.83% of the population.

There were 2,168 households, out of which 29.00% had children under the age of 18 living with them, 57.84% were married couples living together, 8.81% had a female householder with no spouse present, and 30.72% were non-families. 26.60% of all households were made up of individuals, and 13.50% had someone living alone who was 65 years of age or older. The average household size was 2.64 and the average family size was 3.24.

The township's age distribution consisted of 15.8% under the age of 18, 15.1% from 18 to 24, 23.3% from 25 to 44, 28.4% from 45 to 64, and 17.4% who were 65 years of age or older. The median age was 42.3 years. For every 100 females, there were 106.1 males. For every 100 females age 18 and over, there were 109.8 males.

The median income for a household in the township was $67,639, and the median income for a family was $73,889. Males had a median income of $49,391 versus $25,760 for females. The per capita income for the township was $32,914. About 8.5% of families and 8.6% of the population were below the poverty line, including 8.5% of those under age 18 and 4.2% of those age 65 or over.

Historical population
Census	Pop.	Note	%±
1930	1,762		—
1940	1,885		7.0%
1950	2,248		19.3%
1960	2,992		33.1%
1970	3,797		26.9%
1980	4,195		10.5%
1990	4,210		0.4%
2000	5,369		27.5%
2010	5,704		6.2%
2020	5,527		−3.1%
US Decennial Census

== School districts ==
- Central Community Unit School District 301
- Community Unit School District 300
- Genoa-Kingston Community Unit School District 424

== Political districts ==
- Illinois's 16th congressional district
- State House District 69
- State Senate District 35
