= East Paw Paw, Illinois =

- Unincorporated community
- Location within Illinois Location within the United States
- Coordinates: 41°41′17″N 88°56′21″W
- Country: United States
- State: Illinois
- Counties: DeKalb, Lee
- Townships: Paw Paw, Wyoming
- Elevation: 889 ft (271 m)
- Time zone: UTC-6 (Central (CST))
  - Summer (DST): UTC-5 (CDT)
- Area codes: 815 & 779
- GNIS feature ID: 1816536

East Paw Paw is an unincorporated community in DeKalb and Lee counties, Illinois, United States, located 2 miles (3.2 km) east of Paw Paw.
