= Shabbona Grove, Illinois =

- Unincorporated community
- Location within Illinois Location within the United States
- Coordinates: 41°43′57″N 88°51′20″W
- Country: United States
- State: Illinois
- County: DeKalb
- Elevation: 833 ft (254 m)
- Time zone: UTC-6 (Central (CST))
  - Summer (DST): UTC-5 (CDT)
- Area codes: 815 & 779
- GNIS feature ID: 422079

Shabbona Grove is an unincorporated community in DeKalb County, Illinois, United States. Shabbona Grove is located on the south edge of Shabbona Lake State Park, 2.5 miles (4.0 km) south-southeast of Shabbona.

== History ==
A post office called Shabbona Grove was established in 1844, and remained in operation until it was discontinued in 1933. Shabbona Grove was platted in 1885. The community was named for Shabbona, a Potawatomi chief.

== Notable person ==
- George Pierce, MLB pitcher for the Chicago Cubs and St. Louis Cardinals
