= Somonauk, Illinois =

Somonauk
- Village
- Location of Somonauk in DeKalb County, Illinois.
- Coordinates: 41°37′42″N 88°40′52″W
- Country: United States
- State: Illinois
- Counties: DeKalb, LaSalle
- Townships: Somonauk, Northville
- Settled: 1834
- Incorporated (village): February 16, 1865

Area
  - Total: 2.49 sq mi (6.46 km^{2})
  - Land: 2.49 sq mi (6.44 km^{2})
  - Water: 0.0077 sq mi (0.02 km^{2})
- Elevation: 686 ft (209 m)

Population (2020)
  - Total: 1,786
  - Density: 718.0/sq mi (277.22/km^{2})
- Time zone: UTC-6 (CST)
  - Summer (DST): UTC-5 (CDT)
- ZIP Code(s): 60552
- Area codes: 815 & 779
- FIPS code: 17-70460
- GNIS feature ID: 2399838
- Website: www.vil.somonauk.il.us

Somonauk is a village in DeKalb and LaSalle Counties in the U.S. state of Illinois. The population was 1,786 at the 2020 Census, down from 1,893 at the 2010 Census.

The DeKalb County portion of Somonauk is part of the Chicago-Naperville-Elgin, IL-IN-WI Metropolitan Statistical Area, while the small portion that lies in LaSalle County is part of the Ottawa, IL Micropolitan Statistical Area.

== History ==
The name "Somonauk" is of Pottawatomie origin. The name is most likely derived from the phonetic phrase As-sim-in-eh-kon, which translates to "pawpaw grove", in reference to the vast groves of pawpaw trees that filled the area at that time.

In 1986, an F-14A Tomcat flew over the town

The Second Treaty of Prairie du Chien, signed by General John McNeil Jr., Colonel Pierre Menard, and Caleb Atwater for the United States on June 29, 1829, references four sections of land being reserved for Chief Awn-kote and his band of 171 villagers "at the village of Saw-meh-naug along the Fox and Illinois Rivers". The Saw-meh-naug, along with the other Pottawatomie of the Illinois River (known as the Prairie Group), as well as the Sauk and the Chippewa, had aided the U.S. in the Black Hawk War. After the war, as a thanks to the Pottawatomie, the U.S. Government signed a treaty allowing the Prairie Group tribes to continue to hunt on U.S. land, outside of their allocated reservations. However, due to "rumors of the Pottawatomie being restless and committing depredations in the northern part of the state spreading to central Illinois", and white residents of the state feeling uncomfortable, the Governor "gave the Prairie Group an ultimatum to leave Illinois". By the end of December 1833, the Pottawatomie had left Illinois, and the settlements of the Pottawatomie were free to be claimed by white settlers.

A few months later, in the spring of 1834, the first white settler in DeKalb County had set up shop along a tributary to the Fox River, and the name Somonauk was moved from the area of present-day Ottawa, to where Chicago Road, Governor Beveridge Highway, and Somonauk Creek meet. This is the area known as present-day "Franks". The simple log cabin was used as a station house along the Chicago-Galena mail route between Aurora and Genoa, and would eventually become property of the Beveridge family. This cabin was the first post office in Somonauk Township, and the area both east and west of Somonauk Creek would eventually have 30 settlers, establishing a Presbyterian Church in the same area as the present-day church, and a school house directly across from it on the west side of Governor Beveridge Highway. It's also widely known that this church was a stop on the underground railroad.

Later, in 1836, the post office for the settlement of Somonauk was moved to the intersection of Chicago Road and Somonauk Road and the name would be changed to "Somonauk Crossing". Another post office was established in 1850 on Somonauk Road at present-day Buck Lake, and was known as "Buck's Branch". In 1851, the CB&Q railroad finally made its way through the township, and in 1853, built a station along the line 5 miles south of the early settlement (now known as "Franks"), just north of the LaSalle/DeKalb County border. With that, the name "Somonauk" would make one final move to its current location, being in platted in 1855, and incorporated in 1865. "Somonauk Crossing" then became known as "Freeland Corners". The name of Buck's Branch would change to "Somonoc Depot" for a brief time before the post office was moved to the actual Somonauk railroad depot in December 1855. The closing of "Freeland Corners" post office was such a hardship to the farmers of Freeland Corners and Somonauk Crossing, that they petitioned the Post Office Department to establish another office in the location of Frank Richey's creamers, and that it be called Frank's Post Office. A post office was established in November 1891, once again located in the area of Chicago Road and Somonauk Creek, this time, on the west side of Rimsnider Road, just north of the creek. The post office was discontinued in April 1902, lasting a mere 11 years.

== Geography ==
Somonauk is situated along the boundary between DeKalb and LaSalle counties. In the 2000 census, 1,190 of Somonauk's 1,295 residents (91.9%) lived in DeKalb County and 105 (8.1%) lived in LaSalle County.

According to the 2021 census gazetteer files, Somonauk has a total area of 2.49 square miles (6.45 km^{2}), of which 2.49 square miles (6.45 km^{2}) (or 99.76%) is land and 0.01 square miles (0.03 km^{2}) (or 0.24%) is water.

Sannauk Forest Preserve serves as the unofficial boundary between Somonauk and Sandwich, which resides to the east. The forest preserve, owned and managed by DeKalb County, sits along Somonauk Creek, a tributary of the Fox River.

During the housing bubble of the mid-2000s, a few new subdivisions were planned to be built north of town. When the housing market crashed, the city had already incorporated a large portion of DeKalb county north of town ranging from the Sandwich Township border to Governor Beverage Highway, remaining south of Pratt Road. Since then, no talk has indicated that the subdivisions will be built.

The nearby Lake Holiday area includes a man-made lake created by the damming of Somonauk Creek. An old gravel pit was also flooded and is part of the lake.

== Demographics ==
Historical population
Census	Pop.	Note	%±
1880	587		—
1890	468		−20.3%
1900	630		34.6%
1910	591		−6.2%
1920	540		−8.6%
1930	578		7.0%
1940	610		5.5%
1950	721		18.2%
1960	899		24.7%
1970	1,112		23.7%
1980	1,344		20.9%
1990	1,263		−6.0%
2000	1,295		2.5%
2010	1,893		46.2%
2020	1,786		−5.7%
U.S. Decennial Census

=== 2020 census ===
As of the 2020 census, Somonauk had a population of 1,786, with 717 households and 518 families. The median age was 40.6 years. 24.0% of residents were under the age of 18 and 18.8% were 65 years of age or older. For every 100 females there were 92.9 males, and for every 100 females age 18 and over there were 86.3 males age 18 and over.

90.4% of residents lived in urban areas, while 9.6% lived in rural areas.

Of the 717 households, 33.5% had children under the age of 18 living in them. 48.7% were married-couple households, 14.2% were households with a male householder and no spouse or partner present, and 28.2% were households with a female householder and no spouse or partner present. About 27.0% of all households were made up of individuals, and 16.6% had someone living alone who was 65 years of age or older.

There were 771 housing units, of which 7.0% were vacant. The homeowner vacancy rate was 1.3% and the rental vacancy rate was 8.7%. The population density was 716.12 inhabitants per square mile (276.50/km^{2}), and housing density was 309.14 per square mile (119.36/km^{2}).

Racial composition as of the 2020 census
Race	Number	Percent
White	1,620	90.7%
Black or African American	6	0.3%
American Indian and Alaska Native	3	0.2%
Asian	3	0.2%
Native Hawaiian and Other Pacific Islander	0	0.0%
Some other race	38	2.1%
Two or more races	116	6.5%
Hispanic or Latino (of any race)	117	6.6%

=== Income and poverty ===
The median income for a household in the village was $71,375, and the median income for a family was $87,667. Males had a median income of $50,000 versus $27,639 for females. The per capita income for the village was $32,921. About 3.7% of families and 7.7% of the population were below the poverty line, including 8.8% of those under age 18 and 5.9% of those age 65 or over.

== Education ==
The village of Somonauk is served by Somonauk Community Unit School District (CUSD) #432 which offers grades Pre-K–12. The school's athletic teams are known as the Bobcats. School colors are blue and gold. The school's song is titled "Bobcat Loyalty", and is a basic spin-off of the University of Illinois' fight song, named "Illinois Loyalty".

The community adjoins a private community known as "Lake Holiday". Somonauk School District covers most of the west side of the lake as well as a section of the southeast side. Sandwich Community Unit School District 430 covers most of the east side and a two small sections on the west side of the lake.
