= Somonauk Township, DeKalb County, Illinois =

Somonauk Township
- Township
- Location in DeKalb County

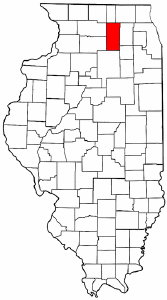
- DeKalb County's location in Illinois
- Coordinates: 41°40′19″N 88°41′07″W
- Country: United States
- State: Illinois
- County: DeKalb
- Established: November 6, 1849

Area
  - Total: 19.35 sq mi (50.1 km^{2})
  - Land: 19.27 sq mi (49.9 km^{2})
  - Water: 0.08 sq mi (0.21 km^{2}) 0.43%
- Elevation: 712 ft (217 m)

Population (2020)
  - Total: 2,006
  - Density: 104.1/sq mi (40.19/km^{2})
- Time zone: UTC-6 (CST)
  - Summer (DST): UTC-5 (CDT)
- ZIP codes: 60548, 60552
- FIPS code: 17-037-70473

Somonauk Township is one of nineteen townships in DeKalb County, Illinois, USA. As of the 2020 census, its population was 2,006 and it contained 823 housing units.

== Geography ==
According to the 2021 census gazetteer files, Somonauk Township has a total area of 19.35 square miles (50.12 km^{2}), of which 19.27 square miles (49.91 km^{2}) (or 99.57%) is land and 0.08 square miles (0.21 km^{2}) (or 0.43%) is water.

=== Cities, towns, villages ===
- Sandwich (partial)
- Somonauk (partial)

=== Unincorporated towns ===
- Franks at 41.710863°N 88.679801°W

=== Cemeteries ===
- Oak Mound
- Oakridge
- Van Olindas

=== Airports and landing strips ===
- George Airport
- Warren Landing Strip

=== Lakes ===
- Buck Lake

== Demographics ==
As of the 2020 census there were 2,006 people, 786 households, and 528 families residing in the township. The population density was 103.68 inhabitants per square mile (40.03/km^{2}). There were 823 housing units at an average density of 42.54 per square mile (16.42/km^{2}). The racial makeup of the township was 90.23% White, 0.40% African American, 0.70% Native American, 0.25% Asian, 0.00% Pacific Islander, 2.39% from other races, and 6.03% from two or more races. Hispanic or Latino of any race were 6.68% of the population.

There were 786 households, out of which 28.40% had children under the age of 18 living with them, 57.51% were married couples living together, 8.65% had a female householder with no spouse present, and 32.82% were non-families. 27.00% of all households were made up of individuals, and 9.70% had someone living alone who was 65 years of age or older. The average household size was 2.64 and the average family size was 3.21.

The township's age distribution consisted of 21.9% under the age of 18, 9.3% from 18 to 24, 20.2% from 25 to 44, 29.5% from 45 to 64, and 19.1% who were 65 years of age or older. The median age was 43.7 years. For every 100 females, there were 88.9 males. For every 100 females age 18 and over, there were 86.7 males.

The median income for a household in the township was $76,944, and the median income for a family was $87,045. Males had a median income of $48,750 versus $26,830 for females. The per capita income for the township was $35,866. About 1.1% of families and 5.5% of the population were below the poverty line, including 2.9% of those under age 18 and 3.8% of those age 65 or over.

Historical population
Census	Pop.	Note	%±
1930	966		—
1940	939		−2.8%
1950	1,077		14.7%
1960	1,273		18.2%
1970	1,448		13.7%
1980	1,610		11.2%
1990	1,543		−4.2%
2000	1,727		11.9%
2010	2,101		21.7%
2020	2,006		−4.5%
US Decennial Census

== School districts ==
- Sandwich Community Unit School District 430
- Somonauk Community Unit School District 432

== Political districts ==
- Illinois's 14th congressional district
- State House District 70
- State Senate District 35
