= Colvin Park, Illinois =

- Unincorporated community
- Location within Illinois Location within the United States
- Coordinates: 42°08′17″N 88°47′00″W
- Country: United States
- State: Illinois
- County: DeKalb
- Elevation: 850 ft (260 m)
- Time zone: UTC-6 (Central (CST))
  - Summer (DST): UTC-5 (CDT)
- Area codes: 815 & 779
- GNIS feature ID: 422570

Colvin Park is an unincorporated community in DeKalb County, Illinois, United States, located 3 miles (4.8 km) north-northwest of Kingston.
