= George Pierce (baseball) =

American baseball player (1888–1935)

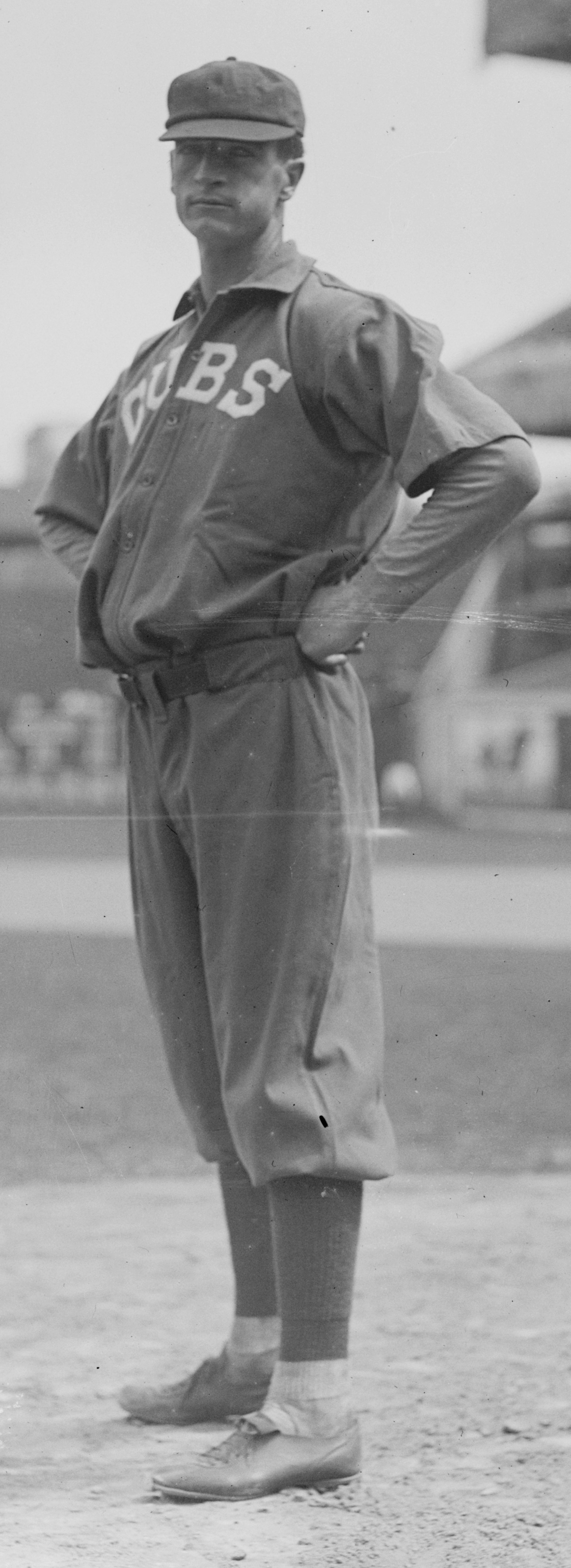
- Pierce in 1913
- Pitcher
- Born: January 10, 1888; Shabbona Grove, Illinois, U.S.
- Died: October 11, 1935 (aged 47); Joliet, Illinois, U.S.
- Batted: Left Threw: Left

MLB debut
- April 16, 1912, for the Chicago Cubs

Last MLB appearance
- May 19, 1917, for the St. Louis Cardinals

MLB statistics
- Win–loss record: 36-27
- Strikeouts: 260
- Earned run average: 3.10
- Stats at Baseball Reference

Teams
- Chicago Cubs (1912–16); St. Louis Cardinals (1917)

George Thomas Pierce (January 10, 1888 – October 11, 1935) was an American Major League Baseball pitcher. He played all or part of six seasons in the majors, from 1912 to 1917, for the Chicago Cubs and St. Louis Cardinals.
