= Clinton Township, DeKalb County, Illinois =

Clinton Township
- Township
- Location in DeKalb County

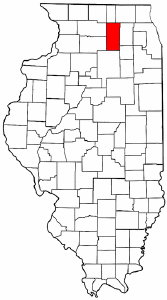
- DeKalb County's location in Illinois
- Coordinates: 41°45′49″N 88°46′34″W
- Country: United States
- State: Illinois
- County: DeKalb
- Established: November 6, 1849

Government
  - Supervisor: Mary Ann Erickson
  - Town Clerk: Janel Erickson
  - Assessor: Dean Lundeen
  - Commissioner: Scott Hunt
  - Trustee: Jerald Hipple; James Wassmann; Kip Anderson; David Erickson

Area
  - Total: 35.26 sq mi (91.3 km^{2})
  - Land: 35.20 sq mi (91.2 km^{2})
  - Water: 0.06 sq mi (0.16 km^{2}) 0.18%
- Elevation: 804 ft (245 m)

Population (2020)
  - Total: 1,828
  - Density: 51.93/sq mi (20.05/km^{2})
- Time zone: UTC-6 (CST)
  - Summer (DST): UTC-5 (CDT)
- ZIP codes: 60518, 60520, 60550, 60552, 60556
- FIPS code: 17-037-14988
- Website: clintontownship-il.gov

Clinton Township is one of nineteen townships in DeKalb County, Illinois, USA. As of the 2020 census, its population was 1,828 and it contained 749 housing units.

== Geography ==
According to the 2021 census gazetteer files, Clinton Township has a total area of 35.26 square miles (91.32 km^{2}), of which 35.20 square miles (91.17 km^{2}) (or 99.82%) is land and 0.06 square miles (0.16 km^{2}) (or 0.18%) is water.

=== Cities, towns, villages ===
- Waterman

=== Cemeteries ===
- Johnson Grove
- North Clinton

=== Airports and landing strips ===
- Wade Airport

== Demographics ==
As of the 2020 census there were 1,828 people, 770 households, and 546 families residing in the township. The population density was 51.84 inhabitants per square mile (20.02/km^{2}). There were 749 housing units at an average density of 21.24 per square mile (8.20/km^{2}). The racial makeup of the township was 88.89% White, 1.48% African American, 0.27% Native American, 0.71% Asian, 0.00% Pacific Islander, 3.06% from other races, and 5.58% from two or more races. Hispanic or Latino of any race were 7.99% of the population.

There were 770 households, out of which 38.70% had children under the age of 18 living with them, 63.51% were married couples living together, 3.38% had a female householder with no spouse present, and 29.09% were non-families. 21.30% of all households were made up of individuals, and 8.80% had someone living alone who was 65 years of age or older. The average household size was 3.11 and the average family size was 3.74.

The township's age distribution consisted of 30.6% under the age of 18, 9.5% from 18 to 24, 28.2% from 25 to 44, 22.7% from 45 to 64, and 9.1% who were 65 years of age or older. The median age was 36.6 years. For every 100 females, there were 80.2 males. For every 100 females age 18 and over, there were 82.7 males.

The median income for a household in the township was $82,250, and the median income for a family was $94,250. Males had a median income of $54,453 versus $26,250 for females. The per capita income for the township was $30,837. About 5.7% of families and 9.8% of the population were below the poverty line, including 11.5% of those under age 18 and 5.5% of those age 65 or over.

Historical population
Census	Pop.	Note	%±
1930	1,179		—
1940	1,222		3.6%
1950	1,378		12.8%
1960	1,508		9.4%
1970	1,591		5.5%
1980	1,451		−8.8%
1990	1,521		4.8%
2000	1,663		9.3%
2010	1,868		12.3%
2020	1,828		−2.1%
US Decennial Census

== School districts ==
- Indian Creek Community Unit District 425

== Political districts ==
- Illinois's 14th congressional district
- State House District 70
- State Senate District 35
