= Charter Grove, Illinois =

- Unincorporated community
- Location within Illinois Location within the United States
- Coordinates: 42°03′59″N 88°37′53″W
- Country: United States
- State: Illinois
- County: DeKalb
- Elevation: 879 ft (268 m)
- Time zone: UTC-6 (Central (CST))
  - Summer (DST): UTC-5 (CDT)
- Area codes: 815 & 779
- GNIS feature ID: 421741

Charter Grove is an unincorporated community in DeKalb County, Illinois, United States, located 4 miles (6.4 km) southeast of Genoa.
