= Malta, Illinois =

Malta
- Village
- Location of Malta in DeKalb County, Illinois.
- Coordinates: 41°55′40″N 88°52′18″W
- Country: United States
- State: Illinois
- County: DeKalb

Area
  - Total: 0.64 sq mi (1.65 km^{2})
  - Land: 0.61 sq mi (1.59 km^{2})
  - Water: 0.023 sq mi (0.06 km^{2})
- Elevation: 906 ft (276 m)

Population (2020)
  - Total: 1,143
  - Density: 1,858.5/sq mi (717.59/km^{2})
- Time zone: UTC-6 (CST)
  - Summer (DST): UTC-5 (CDT)
- ZIP Code(s): 60150
- Area code: 815
- FIPS code: 17-46279
- GNIS feature ID: 2399234
- Website: https://www.villageofmaltail.com/

Malta is a village in DeKalb County, Illinois, United States. The population was 1,143 at the 2020 census.

== History ==
Malta was founded in 1855, under the name of Milton. Shortly afterwards, the name was changed to Etna, then Malta after the Galena (a Maltese Surname) Railway station that served the village. The present name is after the island of Malta.

Malta was the site of the first "seedling mile" of concrete pavement for the transcontinental Lincoln Highway in 1914. Seedling miles were built to demonstrate construction techniques and generate support for the highway. The pavement extended from the Malta cemetery at the west edge of town to near the present location of Kishwaukee College.

Malta struggled financially until the end of World War I, when an influx of new residents to the area arrived. Currently, Malta is a farming community and also supports nearby Kishwaukee College.

== Geography ==
According to the 2021 census gazetteer files, Malta has a total area of 0.64 square miles (1.66 km^{2}), of which 0.62 square miles (1.61 km^{2}) (or 96.39%) is land and 0.02 square miles (0.05 km^{2}) (or 3.61%) is water.

== Business ==
Malta has no large businesses. Most are small operations. Farming and the agriculture industry surround the town. Primary crops are corn and soybeans. Hog confinement operations are near the village within rural Malta Township. A bank, gas station/convenience store, excavating company, grain elevator, apple orchard, small restaurant, a few auto repair facilities, post office, a photographer, a plumbing company, and an auctioneering company make up the businesses in or near the village. A few individuals in the vicinity have their own businesses that involve carpentry, plumbing, landscaping, and animal control.

== Schools ==
For many years, Malta was served by Malta Community Unit School District 433. The District had what was originally a single schoolhouse (K-12) in Village limits and eventually a secondary school (7–12) off of Route 38, keeping grades K-6 at the original building. District 433 was absorbed into neighboring DeKalb Community Unit School District 428 in 2000.

Kishwaukee College, founded in 1968, is located 1 mile west of Malta.

== Demographics ==
Historical population
Census	Pop.	Note	%±
1880	506		—
1890	461		−8.9%
1900	507		10.0%
1910	450		−11.2%
1920	391		−13.1%
1930	383		−2.0%
1940	455		18.8%
1950	510		12.1%
1960	782		53.3%
1970	961		22.9%
1980	995		3.5%
1990	865		−13.1%
2000	969		12.0%
2010	1,164		20.1%
2020	1,143		−1.8%
U.S. Decennial Census

=== 2020 census ===
As of the 2020 census, Malta had a population of 1,143. The median age was 34.3 years. 25.2% of residents were under the age of 18 and 13.1% of residents were 65 years of age or older. For every 100 females there were 98.1 males, and for every 100 females age 18 and over there were 104.5 males age 18 and over.

0.0% of residents lived in urban areas, while 100.0% lived in rural areas.

There were 419 households and 322 families in Malta. Of the households, 34.6% had children under the age of 18 living in them. Of all households, 50.1% were married-couple households, 19.1% were households with a male householder and no spouse or partner present, and 21.2% were households with a female householder and no spouse or partner present. About 24.4% of all households were made up of individuals and 9.1% had someone living alone who was 65 years of age or older.

The population density was 1,791.54 inhabitants per square mile (691.72/km^{2}). There were 464 housing units at an average density of 727.27 per square mile (280.80/km^{2}). Of the housing units, 9.7% were vacant. The homeowner vacancy rate was 1.9% and the rental vacancy rate was 12.7%.

Racial composition as of the 2020 census
Race	Number	Percent
White	976	85.4%
Black or African American	31	2.7%
American Indian and Alaska Native	8	0.7%
Asian	2	0.2%
Native Hawaiian and Other Pacific Islander	0	0.0%
Some other race	52	4.5%
Two or more races	74	6.5%
Hispanic or Latino (of any race)	115	10.1%

=== Income and poverty ===
The median income for a household in the village was $73,250, and the median income for a family was $86,974. Males had a median income of $40,804 versus $36,023 for females. The per capita income for the village was $28,118. About 14.6% of families and 20.6% of the population were below the poverty line, including 32.1% of those under age 18 and 0.9% of those age 65 or over.
