= Sycamore Township, DeKalb County, Illinois =

Sycamore Township
- Township
- Location in DeKalb County

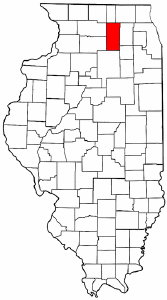
- DeKalb County's location in Illinois
- Coordinates: 42°01′21″N 88°39′03″W
- Country: United States
- State: Illinois
- County: DeKalb
- Established: November 6, 1849

Area
  - Total: 34.54 sq mi (89.5 km^{2})
  - Land: 34.28 sq mi (88.8 km^{2})
  - Water: 0.25 sq mi (0.65 km^{2}) 0.73%
- Elevation: 879 ft (268 m)

Population (2020)
  - Total: 14,702
  - Density: 428.9/sq mi (165.6/km^{2})
- Time zone: UTC-6 (CST)
  - Summer (DST): UTC-5 (CDT)
- ZIP codes: 60135, 60145, 60178
- FIPS code: 17-037-74236
- Website: sycamoretownshipil.org

Sycamore Township is one of nineteen townships in DeKalb County, Illinois, USA. As of the 2020 census, its population was 14,702 and it contained 6,052 housing units.

== Geography ==
According to the 2021 census gazetteer files, Sycamore Township has a total area of 34.54 square miles (89.46 km^{2}), of which 34.28 square miles (88.78 km^{2}) (or 99.27%) is land and 0.25 square miles (0.65 km^{2}) (or 0.73%) is water.

=== Cities, towns, villages ===
- Sycamore (northeast three-quarters)

=== Unincorporated towns ===
- Charter Grove at 42.0664152°N 88.6314771°W

=== Cemeteries ===
- Barron
- Charter Grove
- Elmwood
- Mount Carmel Sycamore

=== Airports and landing strips ===
- Colonial Acres Airport
- Willadae Farms Airport
- Willis Airport

== Demographics ==
As of the 2020 census there were 14,702 people, 5,415 households, and 3,643 families residing in the township. The population density was 425.71 inhabitants per square mile (164.37/km^{2}). There were 6,052 housing units at an average density of 175.24 per square mile (67.66/km^{2}). The racial makeup of the township was 85.92% White, 2.65% African American, 0.37% Native American, 1.75% Asian, 0.01% Pacific Islander, 2.40% from other races, and 6.91% from two or more races. Hispanic or Latino of any race were 7.15% of the population.

There were 5,415 households, out of which 35.20% had children under the age of 18 living with them, 53.48% were married couples living together, 10.40% had a female householder with no spouse present, and 32.72% were non-families. 24.80% of all households were made up of individuals, and 4.90% had someone living alone who was 65 years of age or older. The average household size was 2.70 and the average family size was 3.33.

The township's age distribution consisted of 27.5% under the age of 18, 10.1% from 18 to 24, 23.7% from 25 to 44, 24.9% from 45 to 64, and 13.8% who were 65 years of age or older. The median age was 36.2 years. For every 100 females, there were 92.1 males. For every 100 females age 18 and over, there were 84.5 males.

The median income for a household in the township was $72,917, and the median income for a family was $87,113. Males had a median income of $56,736 versus $33,489 for females. The per capita income for the township was $34,194. About 9.2% of families and 9.8% of the population were below the poverty line, including 12.8% of those under age 18 and 13.1% of those age 65 or over.

Historical population
Census	Pop.	Note	%±
1930	4,741		—
1940	5,167		9.0%
1950	6,275		21.4%
1960	7,328		16.8%
1970	8,522		16.3%
1980	8,549		0.3%
1990	8,843		3.4%
2000	10,303		16.5%
2010	14,425		40.0%
2020	14,702		1.9%
US Decennial Census

== School districts ==
- Genoa-Kingston Community Unit School District 424
- Sycamore Community Unit School District 427

== Political districts ==
- Illinois's 14th congressional district
- State House District 70
- State Senate District 35
