= Shabbona Lake State Park =

State park in DeKalb County, Illinois

Shabbona Lake State Recreation Area
- IUCN category III (natural monument or feature)
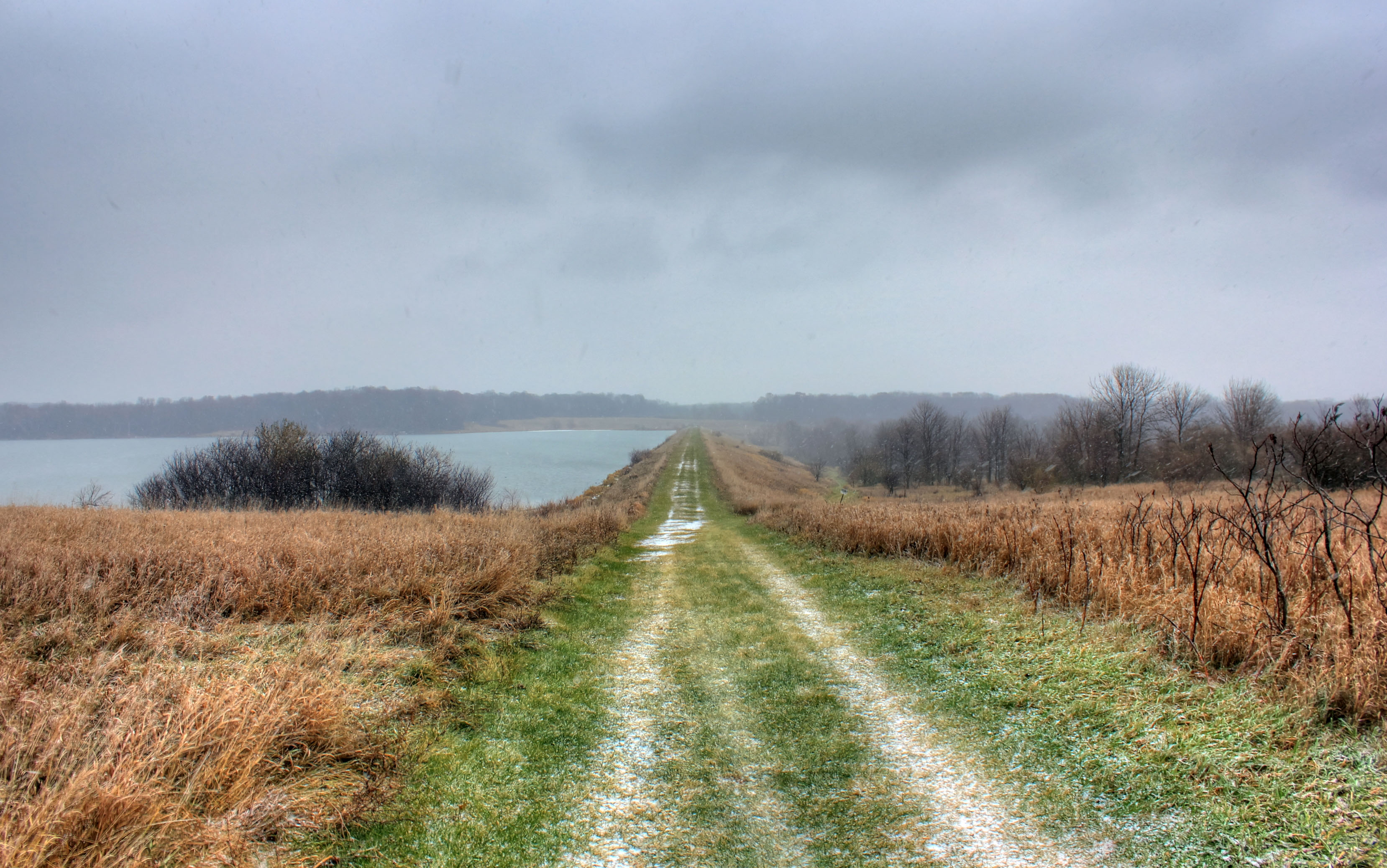
- Hiking trail and Shabbona Lake, Shabbona Lake State Recreation Area, November 2013

- Location within Illinois Location within the United States
- Location: DeKalb County, Illinois, U.S.
- Nearest city: Shabbona, Illinois
- Coordinates: 41°44′22″N 88°51′08″W
- Area: 1,550 acres (630 ha)
- Established: 1978
- Governing body: Illinois Department of Natural Resources

Shabbona Lake State Recreation Area is an Illinois state park on 1,550 acres (630 ha) in Shabbona Township, DeKalb County, Illinois, United States. Shabbona Lake is a man-made lake created in 1975 by damming the (Big) Indian Creek, a tributary of the Fox River. Its name derives from the Potawatomi leader Shabbona.

Seventy miles west of Chicago, off U.S. 30, urban landscape gives way to 1,550 acres (630 ha) of rolling prairie and a 318.8 acres (129.0 ha) man-made fishing lake.

On March 21, 2025, Illinois Governor JB Pritzker signed legislation authorizing the transfer of ownership of the park to the Prairie Band Potawatomi Nation.
