= Paw Paw Township, DeKalb County, Illinois =

Paw Paw Township
- Township
- Location in DeKalb County

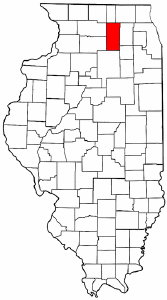
- DeKalb County's location in Illinois
- Coordinates: 41°40′32″N 88°52′56″W
- Country: United States
- State: Illinois
- County: DeKalb
- Established: March 1850

Area
  - Total: 37.83 sq mi (98.0 km^{2})
  - Land: 37.59 sq mi (97.4 km^{2})
  - Water: 0.24 sq mi (0.62 km^{2}) 0.63%
- Elevation: 745 ft (227 m)

Population (2020)
  - Total: 345
  - Density: 9.18/sq mi (3.54/km^{2})
- Time zone: UTC-6 (CST)
  - Summer (DST): UTC-5 (CDT)
- ZIP codes: 60518, 60531, 60550, 60556
- FIPS code: 17-037-58200

Paw Paw Township is one of nineteen townships in DeKalb County, Illinois, USA. As of the 2020 census, its population was 345 and it contained 130 housing units.

== Geography ==
According to the 2021 census gazetteer files, Paw Paw Township has a total area of 37.83 square miles (97.98 km^{2}), of which 37.59 square miles (97.36 km^{2}) (or 99.37%) is land and 0.24 square miles (0.62 km^{2}) (or 0.63%) is water.

=== Unincorporated towns ===
- Rollo at 41.673086°N 88.886195°W

=== Cemeteries ===
- East Paw Paw
- Old Stevens

== Demographics ==
As of the 2020 census there were 345 people, 106 households, and 69 families residing in the township. The population density was 9.12 inhabitants per square mile (3.52/km^{2}). There were 130 housing units at an average density of 3.44 per square mile (1.33/km^{2}). The racial makeup of the township was 96.81% White, 0.00% African American, 0.00% Native American, 0.58% Asian, 0.00% Pacific Islander, 0.29% from other races, and 2.32% from two or more races. Hispanic or Latino of any race were 1.74% of the population.

There were 106 households, out of which 40.60% had children under the age of 18 living with them, 55.66% were married couples living together, 9.43% had a female householder with no spouse present, and 34.91% were non-families. 23.60% of all households were made up of individuals, and 17.90% had someone living alone who was 65 years of age or older. The average household size was 2.55 and the average family size was 3.17.

The township's age distribution consisted of 30.7% under the age of 18, 1.5% from 18 to 24, 19.2% from 25 to 44, 32.5% from 45 to 64, and 15.9% who were 65 years of age or older. The median age was 40.5 years. For every 100 females, there were 138.9 males. For every 100 females age 18 and over, there were 152.7 males.

The median income for a family was $103,250. Males had a median income of $42,222 versus $48,472 for females. The per capita income for the township was $29,184. About 13.0% of families and 21.1% of the population were below the poverty line, including 49.4% of those under age 18 and none of those age 65 or over.

Historical population
Census	Pop.	Note	%±
1930	620		—
1940	563		−9.2%
1950	597		6.0%
1960	573		−4.0%
1970	481		−16.1%
1980	398		−17.3%
1990	384		−3.5%
2000	285		−25.8%
2010	334		17.2%
2020	345		3.3%
US Decennial Census

== School districts ==
- Earlville Community Unit School District 9
- Indian Creek Community Unit District 425
- Lee Center Community Unit School District 271
- Leland Community Unit School District 1

== Political districts ==
- Illinois's 14th congressional district
- State House District 70
- State Senate District 35
