= DeKalb County, Illinois =

County in Illinois, United States

- County
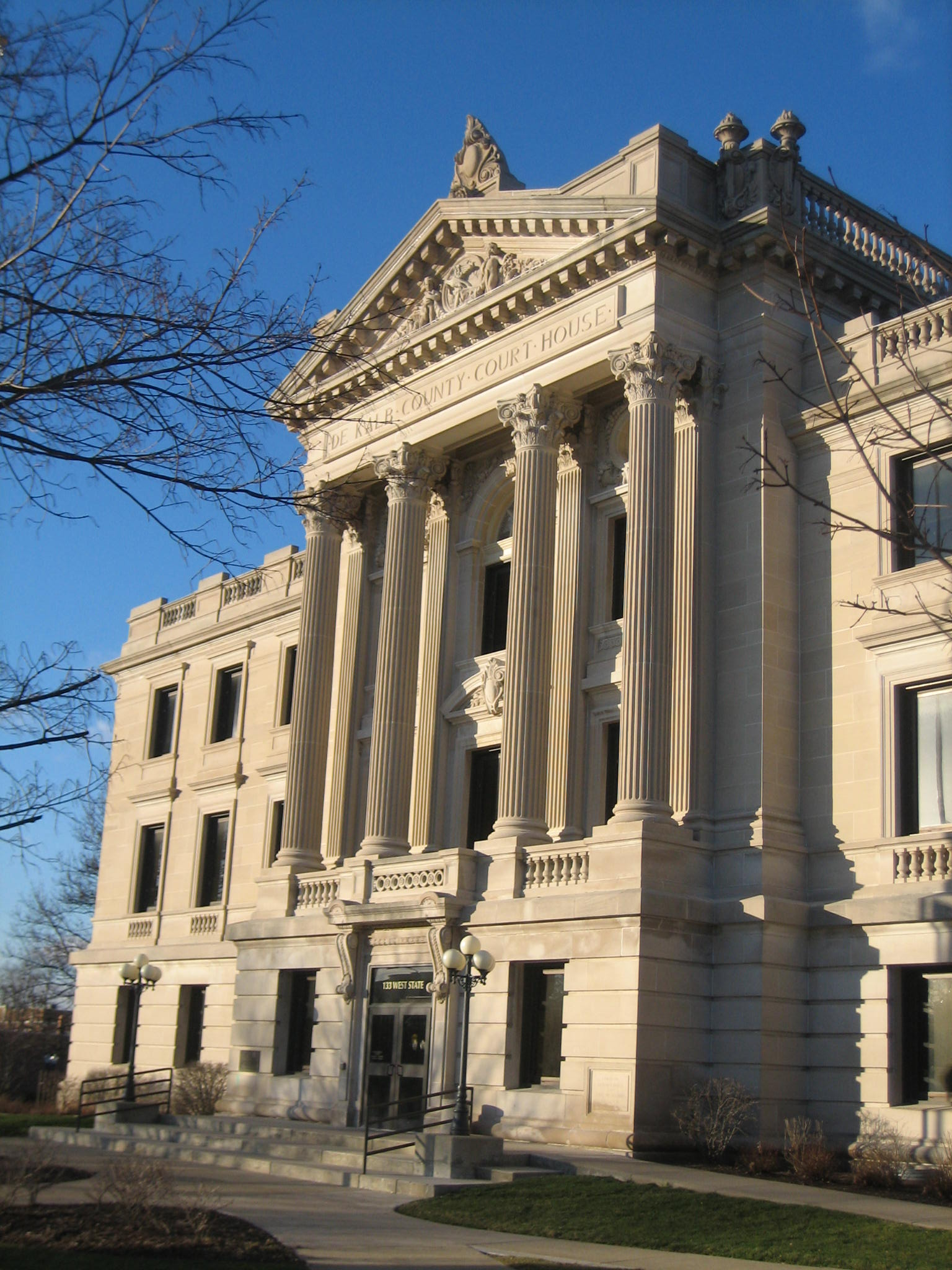
- DeKalb County Court House, Sycamore, Illinois

- Seal

- Location within the U.S. state of Illinois
- Coordinates: 41°53′N 88°46′W
- Country: United States
- State: Illinois
- Founded: March 4, 1837
- Named for: Johann de Kalb
- Seat: Sycamore
- Largest city: DeKalb

Area
  - Total: 635 sq mi (1,640 km^{2})
  - Land: 631 sq mi (1,630 km^{2})
  - Water: 3.4 sq mi (8.8 km^{2}) 0.5%

Population (2020)
  - Total: 100,420
  - Estimate (2025): 101,835 ▲
  - Density: 159/sq mi (61.4/km^{2})
- Time zone: UTC−6 (Central)
  - Summer (DST): UTC−5 (CDT)
- Congressional districts: 11th, 14th, 16th
- Website: www.dekalbcounty.org

DeKalb County is a county located in the U.S. state of Illinois. As of the 2020 United States census, the population was 100,420. Its county seat is Sycamore. DeKalb County is part of the Chicago–Naperville–Elgin, IL–IN–WI Metropolitan Statistical Area.

== History ==
DeKalb County was formed on March 4, 1837, out of Kane County, Illinois. The county was named for Johann de Kalb, a German (Bavarian) hero of the American Revolutionary War. DeKalb County's area is approximately 632.7 square miles, and it is located 63 miles west of Chicago. There are 19 townships in the county; the county seat is Sycamore.

Between 1834 and 1837, after the Potawatomi people had been pushed out, European Americans formed settlements in DeKalb County along streams and wooded areas due to fertile soil, wild game, and food and water opportunities. Primary growth stemmed from the introduction of the railroad, which brought easier methods of transportation and opportunities for industrial growth. Early industries based in DeKalb County included Sandwich Mfg. Co, Marsh Harvester Co, barbed wire, and Gurler Bros Pure Milk Co.

The county is noted for agriculture. In 1852, the DeKalb Agricultural Society produced the county's first Agricultural Fair, in Sycamore. Eventually farmers, businessmen, bankers and newspapermen organized to become the DeKalb County Soil Improvement Association, which later was split into DeKalb County Farm Bureau and DeKalb Agricultural Association (DEKALB AgResearch, Inc., Monsanto). DeKalb County is credited with being the birthplace of the Farm Bureau movement. DeKalb County is the 2nd largest hog producing county in Illinois and the 66th largest in the nation.

Education has played an important role in the area: Northern Illinois University is located in DeKalb and Kishwaukee College is located in Malta. Except for 2020 (due to the COVID-19 pandemic), a major fair has been held each year since 1887 at the Sandwich Fairgrounds in Sandwich.

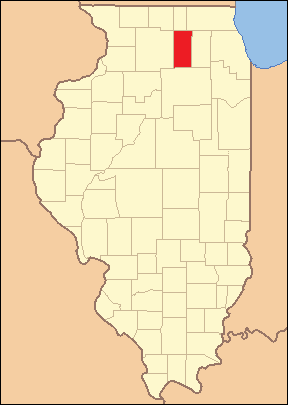
DeKalb County at the time of its creation in 1837

== Pronunciation ==
Unlike similarly spelled locations, such as DeKalb County, Georgia, DeKalb denizens from Illinois pronounce the county name /dɪˈkælb/ di-KALB, with an L sound, as in German, after its namesake.

== Geography ==
According to the US Census Bureau, the county has a total area of 635 square miles (1,640 km^{2}), of which 631 square miles (1,630 km^{2}) is land and 3.4 square miles (8.8 km^{2}) (0.5%) is water.

=== Climate and weather ===
Sycamore, Illinois

Climate chart (precipitation, max. and min. temperature)
J	F	M	A	M	J	J	A	S	O	N	D
1.5 27 10	1.4 32 16	2.5 44 26	3.5 58 37	4.2 70 48	4.5 80 58	4.2 84 63	4.5 81 61	3.5 74 51	2.6 62 40	2.8 45 28	2.1 32 17
- █ Average max. and min. temperatures in °F
- █ Precipitation totals in inches
- Source: The Weather Channel
Metric conversion
J	F	M	A	M	J	J	A	S	O	N	D
39 −3 −12	36 0 −9	62 7 −3	89 14 3	107 21 9	114 27 14	107 29 17	114 27 16	89 23 11	66 17 4	72 7 −2	54 0 −8
- █ Average max. and min. temperatures in °C
- █ Precipitation totals in mm

In recent years, average temperatures in the county seat of Sycamore have ranged from a low of 10 °F (−12 °C) in January to a high of 84 °F (29 °C) in July, although a record low of −27 °F (−33 °C) was recorded in January 1985 and a record high of 103 °F (39 °C) was recorded in August 1988. Average monthly precipitation ranged from 1.40 inches (36 mm) in February to 4.49 inches (114 mm) in June.

=== Adjacent counties ===
- Boone County - north
- McHenry County - northeast
- Kane County - east
- Kendall County - southeast
- LaSalle County - south
- Lee County - west
- Ogle County - west
- Winnebago County - northwest

=== Major highways ===
- Interstate 88
- US Route 30
- US Route 34
- Illinois Route 23
- Illinois Route 38
- Illinois Route 64
- Illinois Route 72
- Illinois Route 110

=== Transit ===
- DeKalb Public Transit

== Demographics ==
Historical population
Census	Pop.	Note	%±
1840	1,697		—
1850	7,540		344.3%
1860	19,086		153.1%
1870	23,265		21.9%
1880	26,768		15.1%
1890	27,066		1.1%
1900	31,756		17.3%
1910	33,457		5.4%
1920	31,339		−6.3%
1930	32,644		4.2%
1940	34,388		5.3%
1950	40,781		18.6%
1960	51,714		26.8%
1970	71,654		38.6%
1980	74,624		4.1%
1990	77,932		4.4%
2000	88,969		14.2%
2010	105,160		18.2%
2020	100,420		−4.5%
2025 (est.)	101,835	▲	1.4%
US Decennial Census; 1790-1960 1900-1990; 1990-2000 2010-2013

2000 census age pyramid for DeKalb County with a marked spike in college-aged individuals due to Northern Illinois University

=== 2020 census ===
As of the 2020 census, the county had a population of 100,420. The median age was 34.3 years; 22.4% of residents were under the age of 18 and 14.3% of residents were 65 years of age or older. For every 100 females there were 97.3 males, and for every 100 females age 18 and over there were 95.1 males age 18 and over.

The racial makeup of the county was 73.9% White, 8.9% Black or African American, 0.6% American Indian and Alaska Native, 2.3% Asian, <0.1% Native Hawaiian and Pacific Islander, 5.6% from some other race, and 8.7% from two or more races. Hispanic or Latino residents of any race comprised 13.5% of the population.

78.2% of residents lived in urban areas, while 21.8% lived in rural areas.

There were 38,487 households in the county, of which 30.7% had children under the age of 18 living in them. Of all households, 45.4% were married-couple households, 20.1% were households with a male householder and no spouse or partner present, and 26.4% were households with a female householder and no spouse or partner present. About 28.7% of all households were made up of individuals and 9.7% had someone living alone who was 65 years of age or older.

There were 41,311 housing units, of which 6.8% were vacant. Among occupied housing units, 61.0% were owner-occupied and 39.0% were renter-occupied. The homeowner vacancy rate was 1.4% and the rental vacancy rate was 7.9%.

=== Racial and ethnic composition ===
DeKalb County, Illinois – Racial and ethnic composition Note: the US Census treats Hispanic/Latino as an ethnic category. This table excludes Latinos from the racial categories and assigns them to a separate category. Hispanics/Latinos may be of any race.
Race / Ethnicity (NH = Non-Hispanic)	Pop 1980	Pop 1990	Pop 2000	Pop 2010	Pop 2020	% 1980	% 1990	% 2000	% 2010	% 2020
White alone (NH)	70,273	71,693	75,772	83,825	71,249	94.17%	91.99%	85.17%	79.71%	70.95%
Black or African American alone (NH)	1,649	2,036	4,040	6,579	8,730	2.21%	2.61%	4.54%	6.26%	8.69%
Native American or Alaska Native alone (NH)	98	110	146	127	119	0.13%	0.14%	0.16%	0.12%	0.12%
Asian alone (NH)	710	1,715	2,067	2,400	2,280	0.95%	2.20%	2.32%	2.28%	2.27%
Native Hawaiian or Pacific Islander alone (NH)	x	x	40	19	29	x	x	0.04%	0.02%	0.03%
Other race alone (NH)	489	49	92	114	298	0.66%	0.06%	0.10%	0.11%	0.30%
Mixed race or Multiracial (NH)	x	x	982	1,449	4,118	x	x	1.10%	1.38%	4.10%
Hispanic or Latino (any race)	1,405	2,329	5,830	10,647	13,597	1.88%	2.99%	6.55%	10.12%	13.54%
Total	74,624	77,932	88,969	105,160	100,420	100.00%	100.00%	100.00%	100.00%	100.00%

=== 2010 census ===
As of the 2010 United States census, there were 105,160 people, 38,484 households, and 23,781 families residing in the county. The population density was 166.6 inhabitants per square mile (64.3/km^{2}). There were 41,079 housing units at an average density of 65.1 per square mile (25.1/km^{2}). The racial makeup of the county was 85.1% white, 6.4% black or African American, 2.3% Asian, 0.3% American Indian, 3.9% from other races, and 2.0% from two or more races. Those of Hispanic or Latino origin made up 10.1% of the population. In terms of ancestry, 32.6% were German, 17.5% were Irish, 8.7% were English, 7.0% were Polish, 6.4% were Italian, 6.3% were Swedish, and 4.7% were Norwegian.

Of the 38,484 households, 31.9% had children under the age of 18 living with them, 47.2% were married couples living together, 10.2% had a female householder with no husband present, 38.2% were non-families, and 25.8% of all households were made up of individuals. The average household size was 2.56 and the average family size was 3.11. The median age was 29.3 years.

The median income for a household in the county was $54,002 and the median income for a family was $70,713. Males had a median income of $50,192 versus $35,246 for females. The per capita income for the county was $24,179. About 7.7% of families and 14.6% of the population were below the poverty line, including 13.2% of those under age 18 and 4.5% of those age 65 or over.

== Communities ==
=== Cities ===
- DeKalb
- Genoa
- Sandwich (mostly)
- Sycamore

=== Town ===
- Cortland

=== Villages ===
- Hinckley
- Kingston
- Kirkland
- Lee (part)
- Malta
- Maple Park (part)
- Shabbona
- Somonauk (mostly)
- Waterman

=== Unincorporated communities ===
- Afton Center
- Charter Grove
- Clare
- Colvin Park
- East Paw Paw
- Elva
- Esmond
- Fairdale
- Five Points
- Franks
- McGirr
- New Lebanon
- Rollo
- Shabbona Grove
- Wilkinson

=== Townships ===
- Afton
- Clinton
- Cortland
- DeKalb
- Franklin
- Genoa
- Kingston
- Malta
- Mayfield
- Milan
- Paw Paw
- Pierce
- Sandwich
- Shabbona
- Somonauk
- South Grove
- Squaw Grove
- Sycamore
- Victor

== Politics ==
United States presidential election results for DeKalb County, Illinois
Year	Republican		Democratic		Third party(ies)	
Year	No.	%	No.	%	No.	%
1892	3,789	60.72%	1,926	30.87%	525	8.41%
1896	5,598	72.38%	1,881	24.32%	255	3.30%
1900	5,923	73.03%	1,881	23.19%	306	3.77%
1904	5,957	77.43%	1,137	14.78%	599	7.79%
1908	5,866	72.50%	1,732	21.41%	493	6.09%
1912	1,776	24.28%	1,568	21.44%	3,970	54.28%
1916	9,764	71.29%	3,386	24.72%	547	3.99%
1920	10,374	83.93%	1,700	13.75%	287	2.32%
1924	10,500	76.40%	1,540	11.20%	1,704	12.40%
1928	11,501	74.19%	3,940	25.41%	62	0.40%
1932	9,356	56.38%	6,923	41.72%	315	1.90%
1936	9,826	53.77%	7,899	43.22%	550	3.01%
1940	12,577	63.95%	6,989	35.53%	102	0.52%
1944	12,157	66.76%	6,004	32.97%	49	0.27%
1948	11,380	68.69%	5,082	30.68%	105	0.63%
1952	14,807	74.23%	5,110	25.62%	30	0.15%
1956	15,078	75.66%	4,826	24.22%	25	0.13%
1960	15,586	69.62%	6,783	30.30%	19	0.08%
1964	11,791	53.48%	10,257	46.52%	1	0.00%
1968	14,535	63.20%	6,974	30.32%	1,490	6.48%
1972	18,910	60.25%	12,375	39.43%	99	0.32%
1976	18,193	59.21%	11,535	37.54%	1,000	3.25%
1980	16,370	53.91%	8,913	29.35%	5,082	16.74%
1984	20,294	64.50%	10,942	34.78%	229	0.73%
1988	17,182	58.86%	11,811	40.46%	197	0.67%
1992	12,655	36.97%	13,744	40.15%	7,833	22.88%
1996	12,380	43.40%	12,715	44.57%	3,432	12.03%
2000	17,139	51.57%	14,798	44.53%	1,296	3.90%
2004	21,095	51.74%	19,263	47.25%	410	1.01%
2008	18,266	40.61%	25,784	57.33%	924	2.05%
2012	18,934	45.91%	21,207	51.42%	1,100	2.67%
2016	19,091	43.79%	20,466	46.94%	4,043	9.27%
2020	21,905	45.65%	24,643	51.35%	1,441	3.00%
2024	22,716	47.75%	23,648	49.71%	1,206	2.54%

As part of Northern Illinois, DeKalb County was a stronghold for the Free Soil Party in its early elections – being among nine Illinois counties to support Martin Van Buren in 1848 – and became overwhelmingly Republican for the century following that party's formation. The only time it did not back the official GOP nominee between 1856 and 1988 was in 1912 when the Republican Party was mortally divided and Progressive Theodore Roosevelt won almost half the county's vote.

During this time, it rejected Democrats even in statewide and national landslides. In 1936, Republican nominee Alf Landon won DeKalb County by double digits while losing 46 of 48 states. Landon held Franklin D. Roosevelt to only 43 percent of DeKalb County's vote, the most he would garner in the county during his four runs for president. Even Barry Goldwater – renowned for his antagonism towards the establishment – won by seven percent in 1964, despite losing sixteen percent of the vote compared to Richard Nixon in 1960.

In 1992, with Democrats starting to make substantial gains in suburban areas across of the US, Bill Clinton became the first Democrat ever to carry the county. Clinton would narrowly win the county again in 1996, carrying the county by 335 votes over Republican nominee Bob Dole.

Since 2008, the county has been a Democratic stronghold, comparable to other college towns around the United States and the other counties around Chicago.

== Education ==
=== Tertiary ===
Northern Illinois University is in the county.

=== K–12 ===
The following school districts have territory in the county, no matter how slight, even if their schools and/or administrative headquarters are in other counties:

K–12:

- Belvidere Consolidated Unit School District 100
- Central Community Unit School District 301
- Community Unit School District 300
- DeKalb Community Unit School District 428
- Earlville Community Unit School District 9
- Genoa-Kingston Community Unit School District 424
- Hinckley-Big Rock Community Unit School District 429
- Hiawatha Community Unit School District 426
- Indian Creek Community Unit District 425
- Kaneland Community Unit School District 302
- Lee Center Community Unit School District 271
- Leland Community Unit School District 1
- Sandwich Community Unit School District 430
- Somonauk Community Unit School District 432
- Sycamore Community Unit School District 427

Secondary:

- Rochelle Township High School District 212

Elementary:

- Creston Community Consolidated School District 161
- Eswood Community Consolidated District 269
- Steward Elementary School District 220

== See also ==
- National Register of Historic Places listings in DeKalb County, Illinois
