= McGirr, Illinois =

- Unincorporated community
- Location within Illinois Location within the United States
- Coordinates: 41°49′03″N 88°48′08″W
- Country: United States
- State: Illinois
- County: DeKalb
- Elevation: 896 ft (273 m)
- Time zone: UTC-6 (Central (CST))
  - Summer (DST): UTC-5 (CDT)
- Area codes: 815 & 779
- GNIS feature ID: 421939

McGirr is an unincorporated community in DeKalb County, Illinois, United States, located3.5 miles (5.6 km) north-northwest of Waterman.
