= Clare, Illinois =

- Unincorporated community
- Nickname: Formerly the Town of Chadwick
- Motto: Clare is among the smallest towns in the United States with a USPO.
- Location within Illinois Location within the United States
- Coordinates: 42°00′58″N 88°49′45″W
- Country: United States
- State: Illinois
- County: DeKalb
- Elevation: 869 ft (265 m)

Population (Currently (as of 2PM, 11/7/16))In the Metropolitan area
  - Total: 31
- Time zone: UTC-6 (Central (CST))
  - Summer (DST): UTC-5 (CDT)
- ZIP code: 60111
- Area codes: 815 & 779
- GNIS feature ID: 421752

Clare is an unincorporated community in DeKalb County, Illinois, United States, located northwest of Sycamore. Clare has a post office with ZIP code 60111.

== Notable people ==
- J. Bradley Burzynski, former state senator
