= Elva, Illinois =

- Unincorporated community
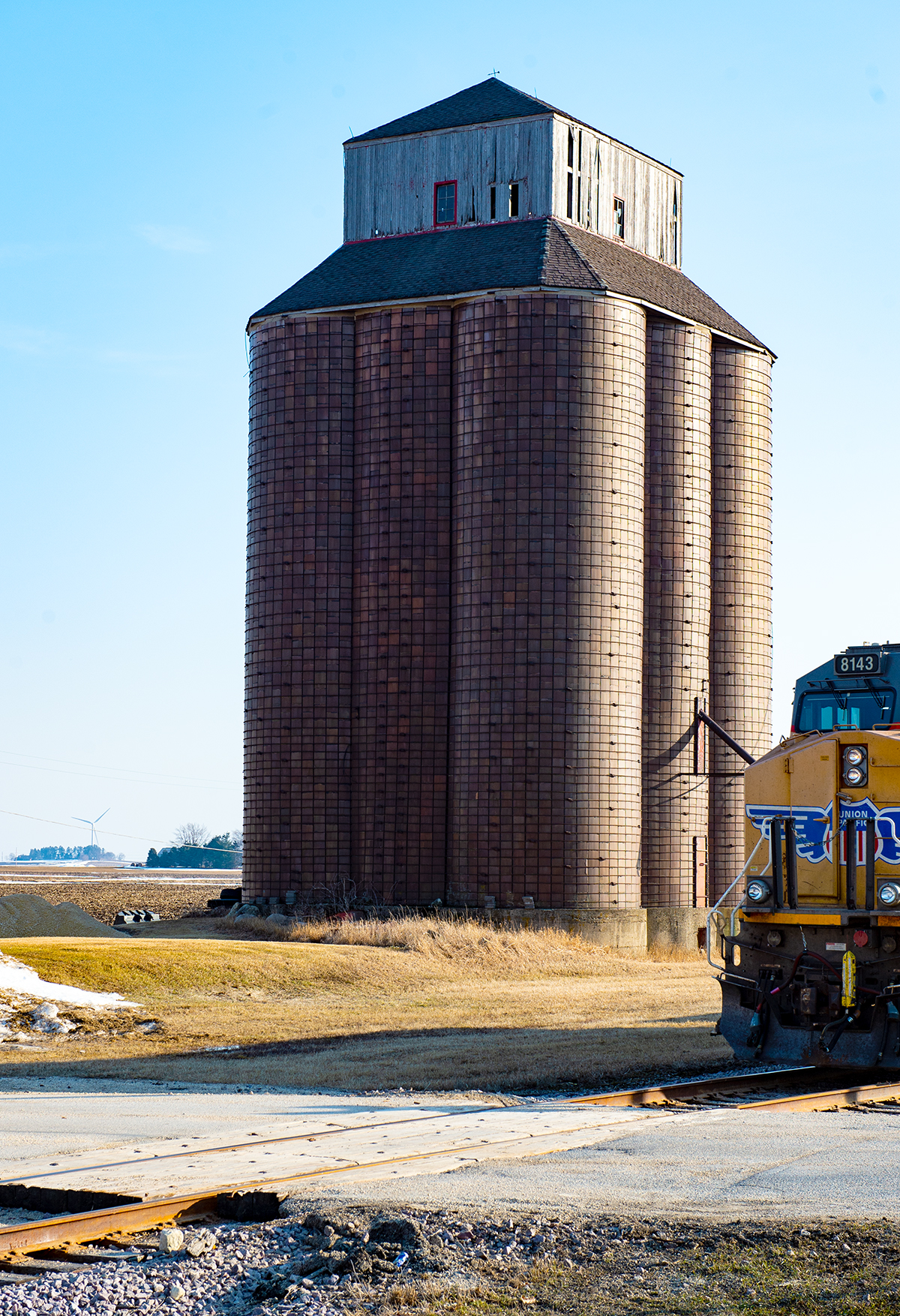
- Historic Elva Elevator

- Location within Illinois Location within the United States
- Coordinates: 41°51′51″N 88°46′34″W
- Country: United States
- State: Illinois
- County: DeKalb
- Elevation: 889 ft (271 m)
- Time zone: UTC-6 (Central (CST))
  - Summer (DST): UTC-5 (CDT)
- Area codes: 815 & 779
- GNIS feature ID: 421786

Elva is an unincorporated community in DeKalb County, Illinois, United States, located 5 miles (8.0 km) south-southwest of DeKalb.

Elva was developed by Joseph Glidden of DeKalb, and was named after his daughter. An 1892 map of Illinois shows the village with the famous grain elevator and train station just south of the main east west road through town. A 1910 Illinois map identifies the town as Elva Station, as a spur line connected up to DeKalb.
