= Kishwaukee College =

Community college in Malta, Illinois, US

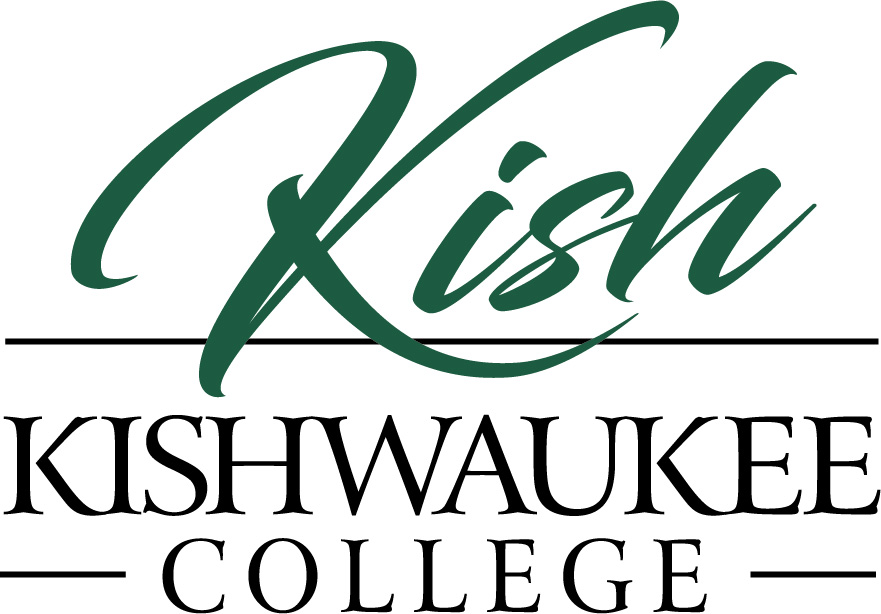
- Type: Public community college
- Established: 1968
- President: Laurie Borowicz
- Faculty: 162
- Administrative staff: 162
- Students: 3,842
- Location: Malta, Illinois, United States; 41.938°N 88.881°W
- Campus: 120 acres (49 ha)
- Nickname: Kougars
- Website: www.kish.edu

Kishwaukee College is a public community college in Malta, Illinois. It is part of the Illinois Community College System and serves District 523, which encompasses most of DeKalb County, and parts of Lee, Ogle and La Salle counties.

== History ==
The college was founded in 1968. Dr. W. Lamar Fly was selected as the college's first president as work began to construct the initial buildings on campus. Over the next several decades, the college continued to grow and adapt to the changing needs of the community, by adding sports facilities, a greenhouse, the Early Childhood Education Center, new science and health technologies, a therapeutic massage clinic, and more. In 2011, voters approved a referendum to expand Kish's campus by updating the current facilities, constructing a new student center and adding parking. In 2015, Dr. Laurie Borowicz was named as the fifth president and the first female president in Kishwaukee College's history and began her term in 2016.

Kishwaukee College's campus hosts a historical marker for the first seedling mile of the cross-country Lincoln Highway, which was constructed in 1914.

== Campus ==
The 120-acre campus is rural and surrounded on all four sides by farm fields. Along with its vast educational resources, Kish's campus is home to an athletic fields, greenhouse facilities, a conference center, the Early Learning Center, and the Kishwaukee Education Consortium.

== Academic profile ==
The college is fully accredited by the Higher Learning Commission and has received a reaffirmation of accreditation through 2028. Kishwaukee College has also received recognition and accreditation through the Illinois Community College Board and Illinois Board of Higher Education.

Additional accreditations include:

- ACEN Nursing Accreditation
- Joint Review Committee on Education in Radiological Technology
- National Automotive Technicians Education Foundation
- Illinois Department of Financial and Professional Regulation
- National College Testing Association Test Center
- National Accreditation Commission for Early Learning Leaders
- American Welding Society
- Commission on Accreditation of Allied Health Education Programs
- Committee on Accreditation of Educational Programs for the Emergency Medical Services Professions

The college has an enrollment of 3,591 as of 2023. The tuition cost for in-district students is $152 per credit hour.

== Student life ==
Kishwaukee College is home to dozens of student clubs and organizations covering interests like dance, gaming, horticulture, government, leadership and more. The college also houses an art gallery, a theatre, an art collection and various arts and culture events throughout the year. Each spring, Kishwaukee College publishes the Kamelian, a literary and arts magazine. The Kamelian, first published in 1968, is the only Illinois literary arts magazine to have won three awards in the Community College Humanities Association National Literary Magazine Competition since 2000.

=== Athletics ===
Kougars are the Kishwaukee College mascot. The Kougars compete in 14 men's and women's sports through the National Junior College Athletic Association. Kish competes in the NJCAA's Region 4 and in the Arrowhead Athletic Conference. The Kougars have won national championships in baseball (1999) and volleyball (2001, 2002, 2006, 2007, 2008).

Men's Teams

- Baseball
- Basketball
- Bowling
- Cross Country
- Golf
- Soccer

Women's Teams

- Basketball
- Bowling
- Cross Country
- Golf
- Soccer
- Softball
- Volleyball

Co-Ed Teams

- Esports

== Notable people ==
Lou Collier played baseball for the Pittsburgh Pirates among others.
