= Franks, Illinois =

- Unincorporated community
- Location within Illinois Location within the United States
- Coordinates: 41°42′39″N 88°40′47″W
- Country: United States
- State: Illinois
- County: DeKalb
- Elevation: 725 ft (221 m)
- Time zone: UTC-6 (Central (CST))
  - Summer (DST): UTC-5 (CDT)
- Area codes: 815 & 779
- GNIS feature ID: 422711

Franks is an unincorporated community in DeKalb County, Illinois, United States, located 5.5 miles (8.9 km) northwest of Sandwich.

Originally, Franks was the village of Somonauk. Founded in 1834, it was situated on Chicago Rd, a mail route that ran from Chicago to the far West. There were dozens of small cabins along Somonauk Creek; wmong them was an Underground Railroad stop. Many of the people of Somonauk died due to lack of food and poverty. Recently, an original house from the Somonauk settlement caught fire. In the mid-1840s, the double-track CB&Q mainline was built from Chicago to Galesburg, prompting the whole village to relocate to the present-day village of Somonauk.
