= Afton Center, Illinois =

- Unincorporated community
- Location within Illinois Location within the United States
- Coordinates: 41°50′57″N 88°46′25″W
- Country: United States
- State: Illinois
- County: DeKalb
- Elevation: 889 ft (271 m)
- Time zone: UTC-6 (Central (CST))
  - Summer (DST): UTC-5 (CDT)
- Area codes: 815 & 779
- GNIS feature ID: 1807789

Afton Center is an unincorporated community in DeKalb County, Illinois, United States, located 6 miles (9.7 km) south of DeKalb.
