= Lee, Illinois =

Lee
- Village
- Motto: Crossroads of commerce
- Location of Lee in DeKalb & Lee Counties, Illinois.
- Coordinates: 41°47′43″N 88°56′30″W
- Country: United States
- State: Illinois
- County: DeKalb, Lee

Area
  - Total: 0.20 sq mi (0.51 km^{2})
  - Land: 0.20 sq mi (0.51 km^{2})
  - Water: 0 sq mi (0.00 km^{2})
- Elevation: 942 ft (287 m)

Population (2020)
  - Total: 313
  - Density: 1,591.2/sq mi (614.35/km^{2})
- Time zone: UTC-6 (CST)
  - Summer (DST): UTC-5 (CDT)
- ZIP code: 60530
- Area codes: 815 & 779
- FIPS code: 17-42587
- GNIS feature ID: 2398410
- Website: https://www.villageoflee.com/

Lee is a village in DeKalb County and Lee County, Illinois, United States. The population was 313 at the 2020 census.

== History ==
Lee is noted for its strong ties to Norwegian American culture. In fact, all of the streets in the village have Norwegian names. In 1974, in honor of the town's centennial, a contest was held to rename the streets and Mary Ellen Prestegaard's entry was chosen. She ran a shop in the village called the Hardanger Hus that sold Norwegian gifts. Many of the original citizens of the community came from the Hardanger region of Norway, and there are still many community members that can trace their ancestry back to that region.

== Geography ==
Lee is located on the border of DeKalb and Lee counties. Viking Vie, the main street of the village, follows the county line. It is 15 miles (24 km) southeast of Rochelle and 17 miles (27 km) southwest of DeKalb.

According to the 2021 census gazetteer files, Lee has a total area of 0.20 square miles (0.52 km^{2}), all land.

The Lee area is unique for a small village, in that the surrounding area is a part of four different watersheds. Northwest of the village is a part of the Rock River valley. Northeast of the village is a part of the Kishwaukee River valley. Southwest of the village is a part of the Green River valley. Southeast of the village is a part of the Fox River valley.

== Demographics ==
Historical population
Census	Pop.	Note	%±
1880	218		—
1890	264		21.1%
1900	287		8.7%
1910	303		5.6%
1920	289		−4.6%
1930	269		−6.9%
1940	257		−4.5%
1950	251		−2.3%
1960	228		−9.2%
1970	252		10.5%
1980	304		20.6%
1990	319		4.9%
2000	313		−1.9%
2010	337		7.7%
2020	313		−7.1%
U.S. Decennial Census

As of the 2020 census there were 313 people, 138 households, and 107 families residing in the village. The population density was 1,580.81 inhabitants per square mile (610.35/km^{2}). There were 142 housing units at an average density of 717.17 per square mile (276.90/km^{2}). The racial makeup of the village was 92.01% White, 1.28% African American, 0.32% Native American, 0.32% Asian, 1.28% from other races, and 4.79% from two or more races. Hispanic or Latino of any race were 6.39% of the population.

There were 138 households, out of which 48.6% had children under the age of 18 living with them, 40.58% were married couples living together, 25.36% had a female householder with no husband present, and 22.46% were non-families. 21.74% of all households were made up of individuals, and 5.80% had someone living alone who was 65 years of age or older. The average household size was 2.91 and the average family size was 2.75.

The village's age distribution consisted of 26.1% under the age of 18, 7.6% from 18 to 24, 30.9% from 25 to 44, 27.6% from 45 to 64, and 7.9% who were 65 years of age or older. The median age was 36.5 years. For every 100 females, there were 92.9 males. For every 100 females age 18 and over, there were 87.3 males.

The median income for a household in the village was $82,500, and the median income for a family was $75,625. Males had a median income of $52,188 versus $34,750 for females. The per capita income for the village was $34,351. About 2.8% of families and 8.7% of the population were below the poverty line, including 7.2% of those under age 18 and 3.3% of those age 65 or over.

== Education ==
It is in the Indian Creek Community Unit District 425.
