= DeKalb Township, DeKalb County, Illinois =

Township in Illinois

DeKalb Township
- Township
- Location in DeKalb County

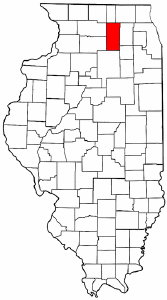
- DeKalb County's location in Illinois
- Coordinates: 41°56′13″N 88°46′20″W
- Country: United States
- State: Illinois
- County: DeKalb
- Established: November 20, 1850

Government
  - Supervisor: Mary Hess
  - Highway Commissioner: Craig Smith
  - Assessor: Rich Dyer
  - Town Clerk: Andrew Tillotson

Area
  - Total: 35.32 sq mi (91.5 km^{2})
  - Land: 35.07 sq mi (90.8 km^{2})
  - Water: 0.24 sq mi (0.62 km^{2}) 0.69%
- Elevation: 866 ft (264 m)

Population (2020)
  - Total: 42,667
  - Density: 1,217/sq mi (469.7/km^{2})
- Time zone: UTC-6 (CST)
  - Summer (DST): UTC-5 (CDT)
- ZIP codes: 60111, 60115, 60150, 60178
- FIPS code: 17-037-19174
- Website: dekalbtownship.org

DeKalb Township is one of nineteen townships in DeKalb County, Illinois. As of the 2020 census, its population was 42,667 and it contained 18,004 housing units. DeKalb Township was originally named Orange Township, but was renamed on November 20, 1850.

== Geography ==
According to the 2021 census gazetteer files, DeKalb Township has a total area of 35.32 square miles (91.48 km^{2}), of which 35.07 square miles (90.83 km^{2}) (or 99.31%) is land and 0.24 square miles (0.62 km^{2}) (or 0.69%) is water.

Map of DeKalb Township

=== Cities, towns, villages ===
- Dekalb (mostly)
- Sycamore (southwest corner)

=== Cemeteries ===
- Evergreen
- Fairview Park
- Oaklawn
- Pleasant Street
- St Mary's Catholic DeKalb
- Whitmore

=== Airports and landing strips ===
- Hoffman Airport
- Kishwaukee Comm Health Heliport

== Demographics ==
As of the 2020 census there were 42,677 people, 17,138 households, and 8,391 families residing in the township. The population density was 1,208.43 inhabitants per square mile (466.58/km^{2}). There were 18,004 housing units at an average density of 509.80 per square mile (196.83/km^{2}). The racial makeup of the township was 58.85% White, 18.09% African American, 0.78% Native American, 3.89% Asian, 0.04% Pacific Islander, 8.24% from other races, and 10.11% from two or more races. Hispanic or Latino of any race were 18.12% of the population.

There were 17,138 households, out of which 25.50% had children under the age of 18 living with them, 31.86% were married couples living together, 13.20% had a female householder with no spouse present, and 51.04% were non-families. 35.80% of all households were made up of individuals, and 7.90% had someone living alone who was 65 years of age or older. The average household size was 2.42 and the average family size was 3.20.

The township's age distribution consisted of 18.4% under the age of 18, 30.2% from 18 to 24, 24.6% from 25 to 44, 17.3% from 45 to 64, and 9.5% who were 65 years of age or older. The median age was 25.6 years. For every 100 females, there were 96.7 males. For every 100 females age 18 and over, there were 98.2 males.

The median income for a household in the township was $43,783, and the median income for a family was $66,530. Males had a median income of $32,492 versus $19,099 for females. The per capita income for the township was $24,956. About 16.7% of families and 25.7% of the population were below the poverty line, including 32.8% of those under age 18 and 6.2% of those age 65 or over.

Historical population
Census	Pop.	Note	%±
1930	9,927		—
1940	11,146		12.3%
1950	14,381		29.0%
1960	20,659		43.7%
1970	35,976		74.1%
1980	36,375		1.1%
1990	38,710		6.4%
2000	42,116		8.8%
2010	46,781		11.1%
2020	42,667		−8.8%
US Decennial Census

== School districts ==
- DeKalb Community Unit School District 428
- Sycamore Community Unit School District 427

== Political districts ==
- Illinois's 14th congressional district
- State House District 70
- State Senate District 35
