= Wilkinson, Illinois =

- Unincorporated community
- Location within Illinois Location within the United States
- Coordinates: 42°00′24″N 88°46′58″W
- Country: United States
- State: Illinois
- County: DeKalb
- Elevation: 889 ft (271 m)
- Time zone: UTC-6 (Central (CST))
  - Summer (DST): UTC-5 (CDT)
- Area codes: 815 & 779
- GNIS feature ID: 423309

Wilkinson is an unincorporated community in DeKalb County, Illinois, United States, located 5 miles (8.0 km) west-northwest of Sycamore.
