= Shabbona, Illinois =

Shabbona
- Village
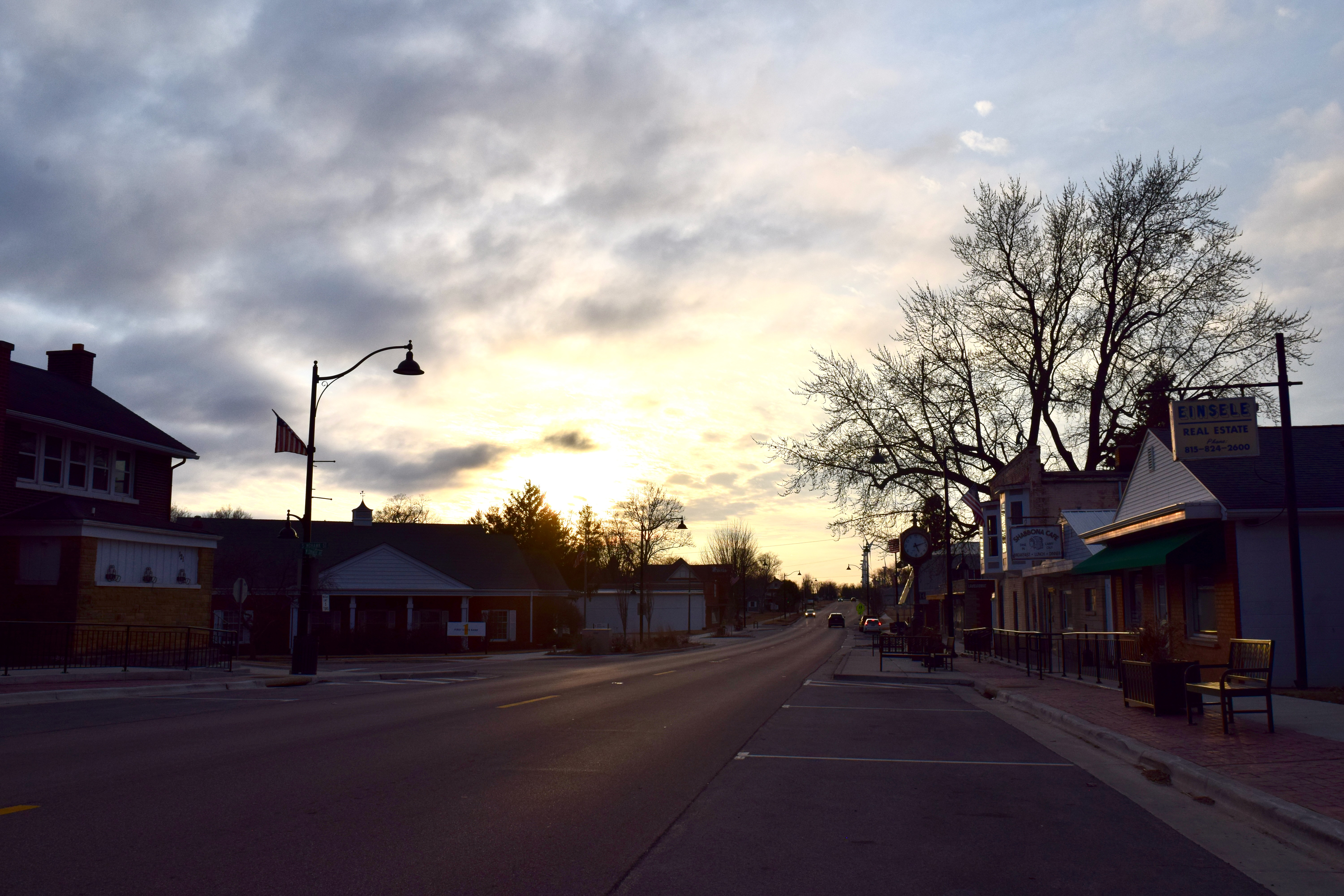
- Downtown Shabbona

- Location of Shabbona in DeKalb County, Illinois.
- Coordinates: 41°45′45″N 88°52′43″W
- Country: United States
- State: Illinois
- County: DeKalb

Area
  - Total: 1.28 sq mi (3.32 km^{2})
  - Land: 1.28 sq mi (3.32 km^{2})
  - Water: 0 sq mi (0.00 km^{2})
- Elevation: 902 ft (275 m)

Population (2020)
  - Total: 863
  - Density: 673/sq mi (259.8/km^{2})
- Time zone: UTC-6 (CST)
  - Summer (DST): UTC-5 (CDT)
- ZIP code: 60550
- Area codes: 815 & 779
- FIPS code: 17-68822
- GNIS feature ID: 2399789
- Website: shabbona-il.com

Shabbona (/ˈʃæˌbʌnə/) is a village in DeKalb County, Illinois, United States. The population was 863 at the 2020 census, down from 925 at the 2010 census.

== History ==
The village takes its name from Shabbona, the 19th century Potawatomi chief and peacemaker. Chief Shabbona traveled through the Fox Valley warning the white people about the approaching war Black Hawk was going to wage. He was hailed as the "Whiteman's Friend".

== Geography ==
Shabbona Lake State Park is located nearby.

According to the 2021 census gazetteer files, Shabbona has a total area of 1.28 square miles (3.32 km^{2}), of which 1.28 square miles (3.32 km^{2}) (or 99.92%) is land and 0.00 square miles (0.00 km^{2}) (or 0.08%) is water.

== Demographics ==
Historical population
Census	Pop.	Note	%±
1880	399		—
1890	502		25.8%
1900	587		16.9%
1910	594		1.2%
1920	735		23.7%
1930	546		−25.7%
1940	593		8.6%
1950	667		12.5%
1960	690		3.4%
1970	730		5.8%
1980	851		16.6%
1990	897		5.4%
2000	929		3.6%
2010	925		−0.4%
2020	863		−6.7%
U.S. Decennial Census

As of the 2020 census there were 863 people, 366 households, and 216 families residing in the village. The population density was 672.12 inhabitants per square mile (259.51/km^{2}). There were 394 housing units at an average density of 306.85 per square mile (118.48/km^{2}). The racial makeup of the village was 93.51% White, 0.46% African American, 0.12% Native American, 0.70% Asian, 0.70% from other races, and 4.52% from two or more races. Hispanic or Latino of any race were 4.52% of the population.

There were 366 households, out of which 23.0% had children under the age of 18 living with them, 46.17% were married couples living together, 7.10% had a female householder with no husband present, and 40.98% were non-families. 35.25% of all households were made up of individuals, and 19.95% had someone living alone who was 65 years of age or older. The average household size was 3.08 and the average family size was 2.35.

The village's age distribution consisted of 15.0% under the age of 18, 12.6% from 18 to 24, 17.8% from 25 to 44, 30% from 45 to 64, and 24.4% who were 65 years of age or older. The median age was 49.2 years. For every 100 females, there were 90.1 males. For every 100 females age 18 and over, there were 81.7 males.

The median income for a household in the village was $66,250, and the median income for a family was $86,711. Males had a median income of $46,000 versus $22,167 for females. The per capita income for the village was $30,966. About 0.9% of families and 6.4% of the population were below the poverty line, including 2.9% of those under age 18 and 9.5% of those age 65 or over.
