= Kingston, Illinois =

Kingston
- Village
- Location of Kingston in DeKalb County, Illinois.
- Coordinates: 42°06′01″N 88°45′25″W
- Country: United States
- State: Illinois
- County: DeKalb

Area
  - Total: 1.01 sq mi (2.61 km^{2})
  - Land: 0.98 sq mi (2.55 km^{2})
  - Water: 0.027 sq mi (0.07 km^{2})
- Elevation: 791 ft (241 m)

Population (2020)
  - Total: 1,108
  - Density: 1,126.2/sq mi (434.83/km^{2})
- Time zone: UTC-6 (CST)
  - Summer (DST): UTC-5 (CDT)
- ZIP Code(s): 60145
- Area code: 815
- FIPS code: 17-40065
- GNIS feature ID: 2398353
- Website: www.villageofkingston.org

Kingston is a village in DeKalb County, Illinois, United States. The population was 1,108 at the 2020 census, down from 1,164 at the 2010 census.

== History ==
Prior to the arrival of white settlers to the region, the land that would become the Village of Kingston was once home to the Potawatomi tribe. The Potawatomi in this area lived and built their communities on the fertile land surrounding the Kishwaukee River. The United States Government forcibly removed the Potawatomi from the land, moving them westward in 1835, and pioneers quickly occupied the territory. The first settlers to arrive in Kingston would come using a trail made by General Winfield Scott and his army during the Black Hawk War. The establishment of Kingston in 1835 makes it one of the first settled townships in DeKalb County, Illinois. The post office was established in 1837 with Levi Lee as postmaster.

The village of Kingston was founded in 1875 when the Chicago & Pacific railroad laid tracks through the township and built a depot on section 22 on a farm belonging to Lyman Stuart, an early settler of Kingston township. Lyman and his brother, James Stuart paid to have the Pleasant Hill church moved to the new site from its original location on Baseline road south of the new village. The Stuart brothers had the village platted in May 1876. The first major fire in the village occurred in January 1886 when several frame buildings were engulfed on the east side of Main street. A farmer, John Uplinger agreed to build a block of brick on the burned site if the citizens would vote to incorporate. An election was held in May 1886 with a question of incorporation on the ballot which resulted in a vote of 69 for incorporation and 17 against. A lumber yard was established by Lyman Stuart in 1876 which Mr. Uplinger purchased from the Stuart estate in 1882. Mr. Uplinger operated the lumber yard until his death in 1892 when control was assumed by his son, B. F. "Frank" Uplinger. The son built a grain elevator in 1892 and in addition to dealing in lumber and grain, he also sold coal & salt. Frank continued this line until 1921 when he sold to the newly formed Kingston Farmers Cooperative. Frank's brother, John H. Uplinger operated a hardware store and sold farm implements and also served as postmaster. Another brother, Charles Uplinger operated the meat market. The citizens voted for a public school house in 1879 which was opened in 1881 and was destroyed by fire in 1895. The second school opened in 1895 and it too was destroyed by fire in 1954. Telephone service came to Kingston in 1898. Indoor plumbing in 1910 and the village was wired for electricity in 1913.

With Kingston being a major "hub" for two railroads business flourished throughout the area. By the 1900s Kingston had many businesses including; a hardware store, department store, grocery, meat market, paint shop, hotel, bank, bakery, shoe store, barber shop, pool room, saloon, general store, creamery, undertaking parlor, saw mill, coal and lumber yard, two blacksmith shops, two livery barns, stock yards and two confectionaries. Kingston even had its own baseball team, The Kingston Tigers. Some of the businesses mentioned above were destroyed in the fire of 1908, which engulfed a large part of town on the west side of Main Street.

W. H. Bell, an early resident of Kingston, instigated the first Kingston Picnic while he was Village President. The picnic was held every year and in 1912, when The Kingston Township Park opened, the picnic had a permanent home. The annual Kingston Picnic was held for over 100 years and celebrated its centennial in 1976.

== Geography ==
According to the 2010 census, Kingston has a total area of 1.015 square miles (2.63 km^{2}), of which 0.99 square miles (2.56 km^{2}) (or 97.54%) is land and 0.025 square miles (0.06 km^{2}) (or 2.46%) is water.

== Demographics ==
Historical population
Census	Pop.	Note	%±
1880	138		—
1890	295		113.8%
1900	305		3.4%
1910	294		−3.6%
1920	235		−20.1%
1930	242		3.0%
1940	259		7.0%
1950	327		26.3%
1960	406		24.2%
1970	481		18.5%
1980	618		28.5%
1990	562		−9.1%
2000	980		74.4%
2010	1,164		18.8%
2020	1,108		−4.8%
U.S. Decennial Census

=== Racial and ethnic composition ===
Kingston village, Illinois – Racial and ethnic composition Note: the US Census treats Hispanic/Latino as an ethnic category. This table excludes Latinos from the racial categories and assigns them to a separate category. Hispanics/Latinos may be of any race.
Race / Ethnicity (NH = Non-Hispanic)	Pop 2000	Pop 2010	Pop 2020	% 2000	% 2010	% 2020
White alone (NH)	907	1,028	924	92.55%	88.32%	83.39%
Black or African American alone (NH)	1	8	8	0.10%	0.69%	0.72%
Native American or Alaska Native alone (NH)	4	4	1	0.41%	0.34%	0.09%
Asian alone (NH)	2	5	2	0.20%	0.43%	0.18%
Native Hawaiian or Pacific Islander alone (NH)	0	0	0	0.00%	0.00%	0.00%
Other race alone (NH)	0	0	3	0.00%	0.00%	0.27%
Mixed race or Multiracial (NH)	2	6	49	0.20%	0.52%	4.42%
Hispanic or Latino (any race)	64	113	121	6.53%	9.71%	10.92%
Total	980	1,164	1,108	100.00%	100.00%	100.00%

=== 2020 census ===
As of the 2020 census, Kingston had a population of 1,108. There were 390 households in the village, with 301 families residing in the village. The population density was 1,097.03 inhabitants per square mile (423.57/km^{2}), and there were 412 housing units at an average density of 407.92 per square mile (157.50/km^{2}).

The median age was 38.9 years. 24.9% of residents were under the age of 18 and 11.3% of residents were 65 years of age or older. For every 100 females there were 97.9 males, and for every 100 females age 18 and over there were 104.9 males age 18 and over. 0.0% of residents lived in urban areas, while 100.0% lived in rural areas.

Among households, 37.7% had children under the age of 18 living in them. Of all households, 57.7% were married-couple households, 18.7% were households with a male householder and no spouse or partner present, and 13.6% were households with a female householder and no spouse or partner present. About 18.7% of all households were made up of individuals and 5.9% had someone living alone who was 65 years of age or older. Among housing units, 5.3% were vacant; the homeowner vacancy rate was 0.9% and the rental vacancy rate was 6.2%.

Racial composition as of the 2020 census
Race	Number	Percent
White	947	85.5%
Black or African American	9	0.8%
American Indian and Alaska Native	5	0.5%
Asian	2	0.2%
Native Hawaiian and Other Pacific Islander	0	0.0%
Some other race	48	4.3%
Two or more races	97	8.8%

=== Income and poverty ===
The median income for a household in the village was $84,375, and the median income for a family was $92,228. Males had a median income of $46,696 versus $26,821 for females. The per capita income for the village was $30,270. About 5.6% of families and 5.8% of the population were below the poverty line, including 8.9% of those under age 18 and 6.1% of those age 65 or over.

== Education ==
Kingston is served by the Genoa-Kingston Community Unit School District with nearby Genoa. The district has four public schools: Genoa Elementary School (Grades 3–5; Genoa), Kingston Elementary School] (Grades K-2; Kingston), Genoa-Kingston Middle School (Grades 6–8), and Genoa-Kingston High School (Grades 9–12). The GK School District's team name is the Cogs, an acronym created from the phrase "Community of Genoa Schools" that also evokes a feeling of teamwork not unlike the cogs in a machine, however some local history states that it stands for "Consolidation of Genoa Schools".
