= Waterman, Illinois =

Waterman
- Village
- Location of Waterman in DeKalb County, Illinois.
- Coordinates: 41°46′00″N 88°45′28″W
- Country: United States
- State: Illinois
- County: DeKalb

Area
  - Total: 1.45 sq mi (3.76 km^{2})
  - Land: 1.45 sq mi (3.76 km^{2})
  - Water: 0 sq mi (0.00 km^{2})
- Elevation: 810 ft (250 m)

Population (2020)
  - Total: 1,433
  - Density: 987.8/sq mi (381.41/km^{2})
- Time zone: UTC-6 (CST)
  - Summer (DST): UTC-5 (CDT)
- ZIP code: 60556
- Area code: 815
- FIPS code: 17-79163
- GNIS feature ID: 2400104
- Website: https://villageofwaterman.com/

Waterman is a village in DeKalb County, Illinois, United States. The population was 1,433 at the 2020 census.

The village is known for the DeKalb Ag seed corn processing plant, now owned by the German company, Bayer. The "Waterman and Western" train line that operated in Lion's Club Park was a 1/3 scale train line with a 1/2 mile train line circling the park and was a hobby of a local resident before it was destroyed by a fire in 2021.

== Geography ==
According to the 2010 census, Waterman has a total area of 1.482 square miles (3.84 km^{2}), of which 1.48 square miles (3.83 km^{2}) (or 99.87%) is land and 0.002 square miles (0.01 km^{2}) (or 0.13%) is water.

== Demographics ==
Historical population
Census	Pop.	Note	%±
1880	291		—
1890	351		20.6%
1900	358		2.0%
1910	398		11.2%
1920	401		0.8%
1930	520		29.7%
1940	579		11.3%
1950	750		29.5%
1960	916		22.1%
1970	990		8.1%
1980	943		−4.7%
1990	1,074		13.9%
2000	1,224		14.0%
2010	1,506		23.0%
2020	1,433		−4.8%
U.S. Decennial Census

=== 2020 census ===
As of the 2020 census, Waterman had a population of 1,433. The median age was 37.3 years. 24.6% of residents were under the age of 18 and 12.0% of residents were 65 years of age or older. For every 100 females there were 104.1 males, and for every 100 females age 18 and over there were 100.7 males age 18 and over.

The population density was 987.59 inhabitants per square mile (381.31/km^{2}). There were 591 housing units at an average density of 407.31 per square mile (157.26/km^{2}). 0.0% of residents lived in urban areas, while 100.0% lived in rural areas.

There were 541 households in Waterman, of which 33.8% had children under the age of 18 living in them. Of all households, 52.9% were married-couple households, 17.7% were households with a male householder and no spouse or partner present, and 20.5% were households with a female householder and no spouse or partner present. About 24.2% of all households were made up of individuals and 10.2% had someone living alone who was 65 years of age or older.

Of these housing units, 8.5% were vacant. The homeowner vacancy rate was 1.7% and the rental vacancy rate was 4.8%.

Racial composition as of the 2020 census
Race	Number	Percent
White	1,265	88.3%
Black or African American	19	1.3%
American Indian and Alaska Native	5	0.3%
Asian	11	0.8%
Native Hawaiian and Other Pacific Islander	0	0.0%
Some other race	49	3.4%
Two or more races	84	5.9%
Hispanic or Latino (of any race)	126	8.8%

=== Income and poverty ===
The median income for a household in the village was $82,500, and the median income for a family was $94,875. Males had a median income of $60,000 versus $27,500 for females. The per capita income for the village was $30,742. About 5.2% of families and 9.4% of the population were below the poverty line, including 13.9% of those under age 18 and 8.3% of those age 65 or over.
