= Indian Creek Community Unit School District 425 =

School district in DeKalb and Lee counties in Illinois

Address
- 506 South Shabbona Road Shabbona, Illinois, 60550; United States

District information
- Type: Public
- Grades: PreK–12
- NCES District ID: 1735970

Students and staff
- Students: 716

Other information
- Website: www.indiancreekschools.org

Indian Creek Community Unit School District 425 is a unit school district in DeKalb County, Illinois and extending into Lee County, Illinois. As of 2016, it had 723 students. It operates three public schools: Indian Creek Elementary in Shabbona for kindergarten through fourth grade; Indian Creek Middle School in Waterman for fifth through eighth grade; and Indian Creek High School in Shabbona.

== History ==
=== Lee ===
Public school existed in Lee before 1874; by 1874, the public school at Lee was being held at the Dyas Building. A schoolhouse was built in 1876. Another was built in 1890, and an addition for the three-year high school was put on this building in 1918.

A school in Lee was also built in 1936.

=== Rollo ===
Rollo had old-fashioned wooden country schoolhouses until 1913. Rollo Consolidated School opened on January 13, 1913, on the western edge of Rollo, and housed all grades through the first three years of high school. High school seniors originally attended Shabbona or Earlville; in 1935, Rollo became a four-year high school, with the official name of Rollo Township High School.

The Rollo district eventually consolidated with Shabbona. The final Rollo high school class was 1954; grade school continued in the building until 1977. The school building was used for township purposes and was torn down in 1984.

=== Shabbona ===
==== Shabbona School District 125 ====
The grade school district in Shabbona existed by 1870 when a two-story wooden school was built. Additions were made in 1882 and 1886. Three-year high school was added in 1887. The school building was torn down in 1919.

==== Shabbona High School District 410 ====
The Shabbona High School District 410 built a school in 1920, but it burned down in 1922.

==== Shabbona Community School ====
The Shabonna schools opened a new building for all grades in January 1923. High school was held in this building until June 1954.

=== Waterman ===
Waterman had a new high school built in 1930, and a new grade school built in 1952.

==== Waterman Community Unit School District 431 ====
In 1957, the Waterman districts' population reached 2,000, which was the minimum required by state law to form a community unit school district. At a May 11, 1957 election, the voters approved the unit district by a vote of 88 to 11.

A bond to expand the Waterman high school was approved by the voters in 1960.

=== District 425 ===
DeKalb County held an election in 1948 to combine the entire county into a single unit school district, but the public rejected it by a vote of 7,970 to 665.

The areas of Lee, Shabbona, and Rollo voted to form a unit school district in the March 4, 1949 election, by a vote of 739 to 73, and Shabbona Community Unit School District 425 came into existence on July 1, 1949. Some of the territory in Lee County had to be added by separate petition, and required three petitions in a row because of legal complications.

A new Shabbona High School building opened in September 1954. The 1936 school building in Lee got an addition in 1961.

District 425 annexed Waterman Community Unit School District 431 on August 23, 1993, then adopted the name Indian Creek.

The 1923 school was torn down and Shabbona Elementary School, for kindergarten through fifth grade, built and opened in 2004.
