= Genoa, Illinois =

City of Genoa, Illinois
- Location of Genoa in DeKalb County, Illinois.
- Coordinates: 42°05′34″N 88°41′47″W
- Country: United States
- State: Illinois
- County: DeKalb
- Incorporated: 1876

Area
  - Total: 2.64 sq mi (6.85 km^{2})
  - Land: 2.59 sq mi (6.71 km^{2})
  - Water: 0.054 sq mi (0.14 km^{2})
- Elevation: 830 ft (250 m)

Population (2020)
  - Total: 5,298
  - Density: 2,045.2/sq mi (789.67/km^{2})
- Time zone: UTC-6 (CST)
  - Summer (DST): UTC-5 (CDT)
- ZIP code: 60135
- Area codes: 815 and 779
- FIPS code: 17-28898
- GNIS feature ID: 2393914
- Website: www.genoa-il.com

Genoa is a city in the north-east corner of DeKalb County, Illinois, United States. It is located on the historic Galena-Chicago stagecoach route. At the 2020 census the city had a population of 5,298, up from 5,193 in 2010.

== History ==
Genoa was settled in 1836 by Thomas Madison, an American Revolutionary War soldier from Ashtabula County, Ohio. He named Genoa after a town of the same name in New York. Genoa was incorporated as a village in 1876 and as a city on September 9, 1911.

== Geography ==
According to the 2010 census, Genoa has a total area of 2.655 square miles (6.88 km^{2}), of which 2.6 square miles (6.73 km^{2}) (or 97.93%) is land and 0.055 square miles (0.14 km^{2}) (or 2.07%) is water.

== Demographics ==
Historical population
Census	Pop.	Note	%±
1880	449		—
1890	634		41.2%
1900	1,140		79.8%
1910	1,257		10.3%
1920	1,228		−2.3%
1930	1,168		−4.9%
1940	1,290		10.4%
1950	1,690		31.0%
1960	2,330		37.9%
1970	3,003		28.9%
1980	3,276		9.1%
1990	3,083		−5.9%
2000	4,169		35.2%
2010	5,193		24.6%
2020	5,298		2.0%
U.S. Decennial Census

=== Racial and ethnic composition ===
Genoa city, Illinois – Racial and ethnic composition Note: the US Census treats Hispanic/Latino as an ethnic category. This table excludes Latinos from the racial categories and assigns them to a separate category. Hispanics/Latinos may be of any race.
Race / Ethnicity (NH = Non-Hispanic)	Pop 2000	Pop 2010	Pop 2020	% 2000	% 2010	% 2020
White alone (NH)	3,673	4,289	3,995	88.10%	82.59%	75.41%
Black or African American alone (NH)	6	36	46	0.14%	0.69%	0.87%
Native American or Alaska Native alone (NH)	8	6	10	0.19%	0.12%	0.19%
Asian alone (NH)	12	23	38	0.29%	0.44%	0.72%
Native Hawaiian or Pacific Islander alone (NH)	0	0	0	0.00%	0.00%	0.00%
Other race alone (NH)	1	0	3	0.02%	0.00%	0.06%
Mixed race or Multiracial (NH)	25	55	205	0.60%	1.06%	3.87%
Hispanic or Latino (any race)	444	784	1,001	10.65%	15.10%	18.89%
Total	4,169	5,193	5,298	100.00%	100.00%	100.00%

=== 2020 census ===
As of the 2020 census, Genoa had a population of 5,298, with 1,922 households and 1,251 families residing in the city. The population density was 2,003.78 inhabitants per square mile (773.66/km^{2}). There were 1,993 housing units at an average density of 753.78 per square mile (291.04/km^{2}).

The median age was 36.2 years. 25.9% of residents were under the age of 18 and 11.2% of residents were 65 years of age or older. For every 100 females there were 107.9 males, and for every 100 females age 18 and over there were 104.6 males age 18 and over.

94.8% of residents lived in urban areas, while 5.2% lived in rural areas.

Of the 1,922 households in Genoa, 38.1% had children under the age of 18 living in them. Of all households, 52.2% were married-couple households, 18.2% were households with a male householder and no spouse or partner present, and 20.7% were households with a female householder and no spouse or partner present. About 24.3% of all households were made up of individuals and 9.2% had someone living alone who was 65 years of age or older.

Of the city's 1,993 housing units, 3.6% were vacant. The homeowner vacancy rate was 1.0% and the rental vacancy rate was 5.3%.

Racial composition as of the 2020 census
Race	Number	Percent
White	4,177	78.8%
Black or African American	48	0.9%
American Indian and Alaska Native	22	0.4%
Asian	38	0.7%
Native Hawaiian and Other Pacific Islander	0	0.0%
Some other race	355	6.7%
Two or more races	658	12.4%

=== Income and poverty ===
The median income for a household in the city was $72,795, and the median income for a family was $78,625. Males had a median income of $49,523 versus $28,125 for females. The per capita income for the city was $31,563. About 6.8% of families and 8.8% of the population were below the poverty line, including 8.0% of those under age 18 and 2.1% of those age 65 or over.

== Government ==
Genoa is governed by a mayor and eight-member City Council. The city is divided into four wards, with two aldermen representing each ward. The mayor and aldermen serve four-year terms. The terms of the City Council are staggered such that one alderman from each ward is elected every two years.

=== City Council Members ===
Term expiration indicated in parentheses

- Mayor: Jonathon Brust (2029)
- Ward 1: Christopher Pulley (2029)
- Ward 1: Pam Wesner (2027)
- Ward 2: Vacant
- Ward 2: Walter Stage (2027)
- Ward 3: Kendra Brahen (2027)
- Ward 3: Courtney Winter (2029)
- Ward 4: Gary Roca (2027)
- Ward 4: Dean Gudeman (2029)

A City Clerk is also elected at-large and serves a four-year term. The current city clerk is Becca Stevenson, whose term expires in 2029.

== Education ==
Genoa is part of the Genoa-Kingston (GK) School District with nearby village Kingston. The district has four Public Schools: Kingston Elementary School (Grades K–2), Genoa Elementary School (Grades 3–5), Genoa-Kingston Middle School (Grades 6–8) and Genoa-Kingston High School (Grades 9–12). The school district's mascot is a “Cog”, and the school sports teams are the G-K Cogs (Acronym for Community of Genoa Sports) with the colors being royal blue and orange.

=== Sports ===
Girls athletics include basketball, cheer leading, cross country, dance team, golf, soccer, softball, track and field, and volleyball. Boys athletics include football, baseball, basketball, cross country, golf, soccer, track and field, and wrestling. The town has three state championships to its name: the football team in 1977, the girls track team in 1989, and the girls volleyball team in 2022. Genoa-Kingston High School competes in the Big Northern Conference (BNC), while Genoa-Kingston Middle School competes in the Mid-Northern Conference (MNC).

== Notable person ==
- Edward D. Shurtleff, Illinois state legislator and jurist, was born in Genoa.
