= DeKalb Community Unit School District 428 =

School district in Illinois, United States

Address
- 901 South 4th Street Dekalb, Illinois, 60115; United States

District information
- Type: Public
- Grades: PreK–12
- NCES District ID: 1712000

Students and staff
- Students: 6,618

Other information
- Website: www.dist428.org

DeKalb Community Unit School District 428 is a school district headquartered in DeKalb, Illinois.

== Schools ==
High school:

- DeKalb High School

Middle schools:

- Clinton Rosette Middle School
- Huntley Middle School

Elementary schools:

- Brooks Elementary School
- Cortland Elementary School
- Founders Elementary School
- Jefferson Elementary School
- Lincoln Elementary School
- Littlejohn Elementary School
- Malta Elementary School
- Mitchell Elementary School
- Tyler Elementary School

Preschool:

- Early Learning & Development Center (ELDC)
