= Watersheds of Illinois =

Watersheds of Illinois is a list of basins or catchment areas into which the State of Illinois can be divided based on the place to which water flows.

At the simplest level, in pre-settlement times, Illinois had two watersheds: the Mississippi River and Lake Michigan, with almost the entire State draining to the Mississippi, except for a small area within a few miles of the Lake. This has been complicated by modifications around Lake Michigan, making the Lake itself to some extent a part of the Mississippi watershed.

Although it would now be correct to describe Illinois as part of the Mississippi watershed, such classification would not be particularly useful for locating bodies of water within the State. The following lists are based on the method of subdividing the State that is followed by the Illinois State Water Survey. Any body of water in Illinois can be located within this system.

The Mississippi and Ohio Rivers contain many small, direct tributaries, such as Marys River, which are not considered separate "watersheds" under this system. These small, direct tributaries to the main rivers are considered to be part of the "Mississippi watershed" or "Ohio watershed". A list of the small, direct tributaries that have articles in Wikipedia is also shown.

This list can be used in conjunction with the alphabetical List of rivers of Illinois. Each of the articles about rivers in Illinois should locate that river within the list of watersheds.

== Mississippi River watershed ==
Mississippi River

- Ohio River
  - Cache River
  - Saline River
  - Wabash River
    - Little Wabash River
    - Embarras River
    - Vermilion River (Wabash River tributary)
- Big Muddy River
- Kaskaskia River
- Illinois River
  - Macoupin Creek
  - La Moine River
  - Sangamon River
  - Spoon River
  - Mackinaw River
  - Kickapoo Creek
  - Vermilion River (Illinois River tributary)
  - Fox River (Illinois River tributary)
  - Des Plaines River
  - Kankakee River
    - Iroquois River
- Rock River (Mississippi River)
  - Green River (Illinois)
  - Kishwaukee River
  - Pecatonica River

The minor direct tributaries of the Mississippi include the following, which are parts of the "Mississippi watershed":

- Marys River
- Wood River
- Edwards River
- Henderson Creek
- Hennepin Canal
- Plum River
- Apple River
- Galena River
- Sinsinawa River
- Little Menominee River
- Menominee River

== Lake Michigan watershed ==
- Lake Michigan
- Calumet River
  - Grand Calumet River
- Chicago River

Note: the Chicago River flowed into Lake Michigan until its reversal in 1900. It now is a minor outlet of the Great Lakes Basin and its flow is regulated by the U.S.-Canadian Great Lakes Commission. Note: parts of the Calumet basin, including the Little Calumet River, drain into both the Mississippi watershed via the Cal-Sag Channel and Lake Michigan.

== See also ==
- List of rivers of Illinois
