= List of rivers of Illinois =

This is a list of rivers in the U.S. state of Illinois:

== By drainage basin ==
=== Gulf of Mexico ===
- Mississippi River
  - Ohio River
    - Lusk Creek
    - Saline River
    - Wabash River
      - Little Wabash River
        - Skillet Fork
        - Elm River
        - Fox River
        - Salt Creek
      - Bonpas Creek
      - Embarras River (Illinois)
        - North Fork Embarras River
        - Little Embarras River
          - Donica Creek
      - Little Vermilion River
      - Vermilion River
        - Middle Fork Vermilion River
        - Salt Fork Vermilion River
          - Saline Branch
            - Boneyard Creek
  - Cache River
    - Cypress Creek
  - Big Muddy River
    - Beaucoup Creek
    - Little Muddy River
    - Casey Creek (Casey Fork)
  - Marys River
    - Little Marys River
  - Kaskaskia River
    - Shoal Creek
    - West Okaw River
    - Drum Hill Branch
  - Palmer Creek
  - Wood River
  - Illinois River
    - Macoupin Creek
    - Big Sandy Creek
    - La Moine River
    - Sangamon River
      - Salt Creek
      - Spring Creek
      - Sugar Creek
        - Lick Creek
    - Spoon River
    - Mackinaw River
      - Little Mackinaw River
      - Panther Creek
        - Red River
    - Big Bureau Creek
    - Little Vermilion River
    - Vermilion River
      - Rooks Creek
    - Fox River
      - Indian Creek
      - Somonauk Creek
      - Flint Creek
    - Mazon River
    - Des Plaines River
      - DuPage River
      - Salt Creek
        - Addison Creek
      - Buffalo Creek
      - Hickory Creek
      - Mill Creek
      - Indian Creek
        - Seavey Drainage Ditch
    - Kankakee River
      - Rock Creek
      - Iroquois River
  - Henderson Creek
  - Edwards River
  - Rock River
    - Green River
    - Pine Creek
    - Kyte River
    - Leaf River
    - Stillman Creek
    - Kishwaukee River
      - Killbuck Creek
      - South Branch Kishwaukee River
        - Owens Creek
        - East Branch South Branch Kishwaukee River
      - Beaver Creek
      - Piscasaw Creek
        - Mokeler Creek
      - Coon Creek
      - Rush Creek
      - North Branch Kishwaukee River
    - Pecatonica River
      - Sugar River
      - Yellow Creek
  - Plum River
  - Apple River
  - Galena River
  - Sinsinawa River
  - Little Menominee River
  - Menominee River

=== Gulf of St. Lawrence ===
- Lake Michigan
  - Waukegan River
  - Chicago River
    - North Branch Chicago River
      - Skokie River
    - South Branch Chicago River
      - Bubbly Creek or South Fork South Branch Chicago River
  - Calumet River
    - Grand Calumet River
    - Little Calumet River
      - Midlothian Creek
      - Thorn Creek
        - Butterfield Creek

== Alphabetically ==
- Addison Creek
- Apple River
- Beaucoup Creek
- Beaver Creek
- Big Bureau Creek
- Big Muddy River
- Boneyard Creek
- Bonpas Creek
- Bubbly Creek
- Buffalo Creek
- Butterfield Creek
- Cache River
- Calumet River
- Casey Creek, also known as Casey Fork
- Chicago River
- Coon Creek
- Cypress Creek
- Des Plaines River
- Donica Creek
- Drum Hill Branch
- DuPage River
- East Branch South Branch Kishwaukee River
- Edwards River
- Elm River
- Embarras River (Illinois)
- Fox River (Illinois River tributary), northern Illinois
- Fox River (Little Wabash tributary), southern Illinois
- Galena River
- Grand Calumet River
- Green River
- Henderson Creek
- Hickory Creek
- Illinois River
- Indian Creek
- Iroquois River
- Jackson Creek
- Kankakee River
- Kaskaskia River
- Killbuck Creek
- Kishwaukee River
- Kyte River
- La Moine River
- Leaf River
- Lick Creek
- Little Calumet River
- Little Embarras River
- Little Mackinaw River
- Little Marys River
- Little Menominee River
- Little Muddy River
- Little Vermilion River (Illinois River tributary)
- Little Vermilion River (Wabash River tributary)
- Little Wabash River
- Lusk Creek
- Mackinaw River
- Macoupin Creek
- Marys River
- Mazon River
- Menominee River
- Middle Fork Vermilion River
- Mississippi River
- Mokeler Creek
- North Branch Chicago River
- North Branch Kishwaukee River
- North Fork Embarras River
- Ohio River
- Owens Creek
- Palmer Creek (Columbia, IL)
- Panther Creek (Mackinaw watershed)
- Pecatonica River
- Pine Creek
- Piscasaw Creek
- Plum River
- Red River
- Rock Creek
- Rock River
- Rush Creek
- Saline Branch
- Saline River
- Salt Creek (Des Plaines River tributary)
- Salt Creek (Little Wabash River tributary)
- Salt Creek (Sangamon River tributary)
- Salt Fork Vermilion River
- Sangamon River
- Shoal Creek
- Sinsinawa River
- Skillet Fork
- Skokie River
- Somonauk Creek
- South Branch Chicago River
- South Branch Kishwaukee River
- Spoon River
- Stillman Creek
- Sugar Creek
- Sugar River
- Thorn Creek
- Tyler Creek (Illinois) (not to be confused with a creek of the same in Oregon)
- Vermilion River (Illinois River tributary)
- Vermilion River (Wabash River tributary)
- Wabash River
- West Okaw River
- Wood River
- Yellow Creek

== See also ==
- List of rivers in the United States
- Chicago Sanitary and Ship Canal
- Hennepin Canal Parkway State Park
- Illinois and Michigan Canal
- Watersheds of Illinois
