= Owens Creek =

Owens Creek may refer to:

- Owens Creek, Queensland, a rural locality in Australia
- Owens Creek (Kishwaukee River tributary), a stream in Illinois, U.S.
- Owens Creek (South Grand River tributary), a stream in Missouri, U.S.
