= Salt Creek (Little Wabash River tributary) =

Physical characteristics
- Source
  - location: Confluence of First Salt Creek and Second Salt Creek north of Teutopolis, Illinois
  - coordinates: 39°08′24″N 88°29′28″W
- Mouth
  - location: Confluence with the Little Wabash River, Effingham County, Illinois
  - coordinates: 38°58′31″N 88°32′42″W
  - elevation: 466 ft (142 m)
- Length: 18.5 mi (29.8 km)

Basin features
- Progression: SaltCreek → Little Wabash → Wabash → Ohio → Mississippi → Gulf of Mexico
- GNIS ID: 417895

Salt Creek is a tributary of the Little Wabash River, which it joins near Edgewood, Illinois, near the boundary between Effingham and Clay counties. There are at least two other "Salt Creeks" in Illinois: Salt Creek (Des Plaines River tributary) and Salt Creek (Sangamon River tributary).

Salt Creek is about 18.5 miles (29.8 km) in length.

== Cities, towns and counties ==
Salt Creek drains the following cities, towns and villages:

- Effingham
- Teutopolis
- Watson

Salt Creek drains parts of the following Illinois counties:

- Cumberland County
- Effingham County

== See also ==
- List of Illinois rivers
