= Little Vermilion River (Illinois River tributary) =

Little Vermillion River

Location
- Country: United States of America
- States: Illinois
- Cities: Mendota, Troy Grove, La Salle

Physical characteristics
- Source
  - location: Mendota Township, LaSalle County, Illinois
  - coordinates: 41°36′46″N 89°05′44″W
  - elevation: 912 ft (278 m)
- Mouth
  - location: Confluence with the Illinois River, LaSalle, Illinois
  - coordinates: 41°19′29″N 89°04′53″W
  - elevation: 447 ft (136 m)
- Length: 34.7 mi (55.8 km)
- Basin size: 80,420 acres (32,540 ha)

Basin features
- Progression: Little Vermilion River → Illinois River → Mississippi River → Gulf of Mexico
- Landmarks: Mitchell's Grove Nature Preserve
- Population: 14600
- Tributaries
  - left: Tomahawk Creek
  - right: Mendota Creek
- GNIS ID: 412427

The Little Vermilion River is a 34.7-mile-long (55.8 km) tributary of the Illinois River, which it joins near LaSalle, Illinois, opposite the north-flowing Vermilion River. There is another "Little Vermilion River" in Illinois which is a tributary of the Wabash River.

== Land Use ==
Approximately 75% of the land (60,580 acres (24,520 ha)) of the land in the watershed is devoted to agricultural activities, primarily corn (36,943 acres (14,950 ha)) and soybean (22,332 acres (9,037 ha)) production. Native wetlands account for 0.5% (434 acres (176 ha)) of land in the watershed.

== Water Quality ==
An EPA report lists the southern section near La Salle, Illinois as impaired waterway due to excessive zinc from current and historic mining operations. It is also listed for elevated fecal coliform bacteria levels due to the use of combined sewage overflow systems in use by several municipalities within the watershed.

== See also ==
- List of Illinois rivers
- Watersheds of Illinois
