= Red River (Illinois) =

Physical characteristics
- Source
  - location: Olio Township, Woodford County, Illinois
  - coordinates: 40°42′51″N 89°13′06″W
- Mouth
  - location: Olio Township, Woodford County, Illinois
  - coordinates: 40°40′21″N 89°10′47″W
  - elevation: 630 ft (190 m)
- Length: 7.5 mi (12.1 km)

Basin features
- Progression: Red River → Panther Creek → Mackinaw → Illinois → Mississippi → Gulf of Mexico
- GNIS ID: 416464

The Red River is a 7.5-mile-long (12.1 km) tributary of Panther Creek in Woodford County, Illinois. Its headwaters are located southeast of Eureka, and after draining several townships it flows into Panther Creek in Palestine Township. Soon afterwards, Panther Creek itself flows into the Mackinaw River near Congerville. Via the Mackinaw River, the Red River of Illinois is part of the Illinois River and Mississippi River watershed.

The Red River's drainage pattern is an unusual example of a watercourse officially designated as a river flowing into and feeding a larger watercourse that is officially designated as a creek. Usually the etymology flows the other way: smaller creeks feed larger rivers.
