= Little Marys River (Illinois) =

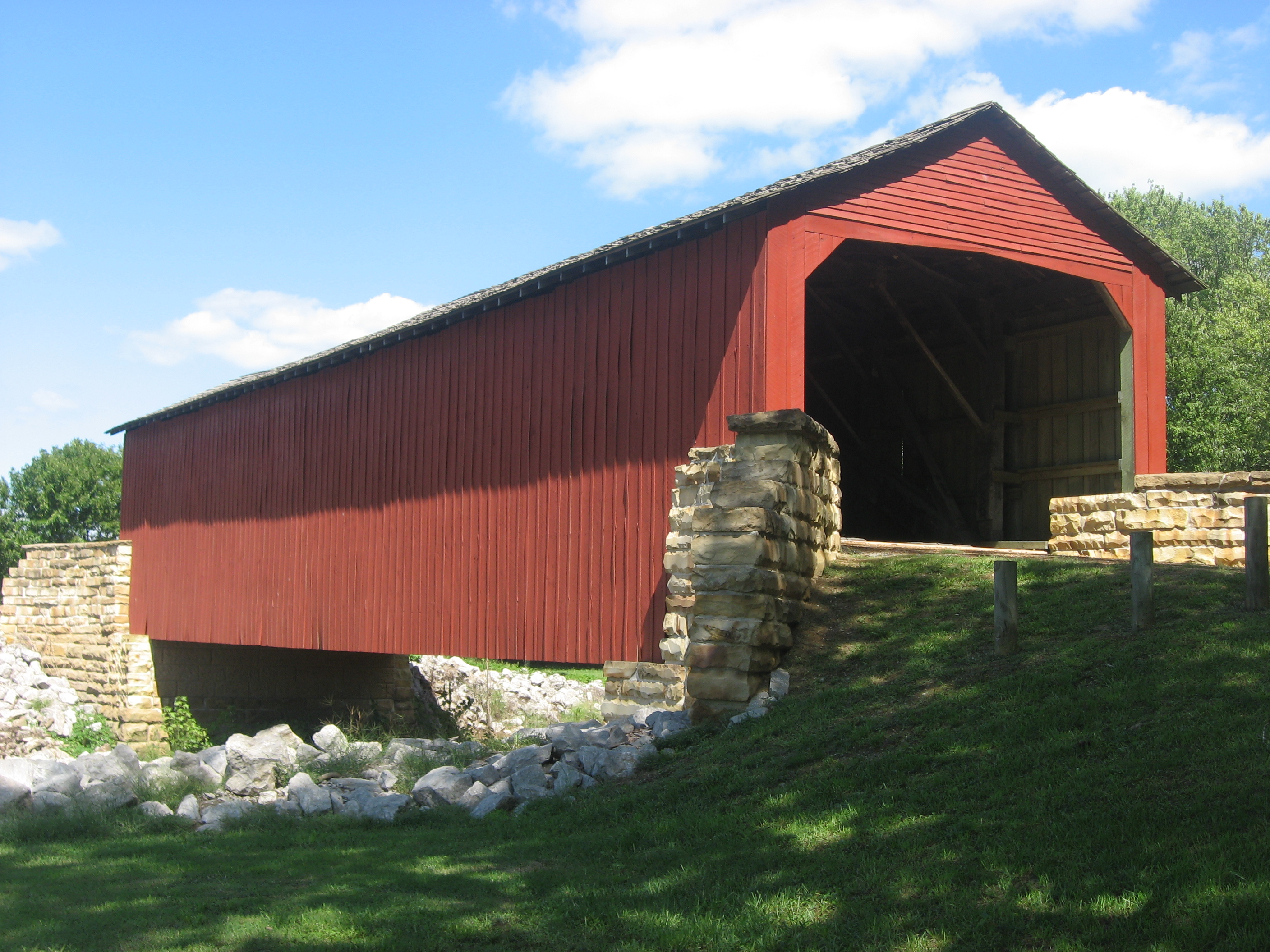
- Little Marys River covered bridge

Physical characteristics
- Source
  - location: Randolph County, Illinois
  - coordinates: 38°06′11″N 89°44′32″W
- Mouth
  - location: Confluence with Marys River
  - coordinates: 37°55′29″N 89°44′16″W
  - elevation: 358 ft (109 m)
- Length: 24 mi (39 km)

Basin features
- GNIS ID: 412370

The Little Marys River is a 24.2-mile-long (38.9 km) tributary of the Marys River. It is located in Randolph County, Illinois, in the Interior River Valleys and Hills ecoregion.

== See also ==
- List of Illinois rivers
