= Donica Creek =

Stream in Coles County, Illinois, U.S.

Coordinates: 39°38′43″N 87°59′20″W

Donica Creek is a stream in northeast Coles County in the U.S. state of Illinois. It is a tributary to the Little Embarras River.

Donica Creek bears the name of Hiram and Samuel Donica, local pioneers.

== See also ==
- List of rivers of Illinois
