= Special district =

Special district may refer to:

- Certain districts of Ethiopia not part of a zone
- Special district (United States), independent, special-purpose governmental units
  - Special districts in Illinois
- Special districts of China
