= Lusk Creek =

River in Illinois, United States

Physical characteristics
- Source
  - location: Pope County, Shawnee National Forest
  - coordinates: 37°34′59″N 88°34′35″W
- Mouth
  - location: Confluence with the Ohio River at Golconda
  - coordinates: 37°22′04″N 88°28′54″W

Lusk Creek is a creek located in southeastern Illinois. It is a tributary of the Ohio River, which it joins at Golconda.

Lusk Creek flows through the Lusk Creek Canyon, which is perhaps the wildest place in Illinois. Only a single bridge crosses the creek. The watershed is almost entirely within the Shawnee National Forest, and includes the Lusk Creek Wilderness Area. The entire watershed is within Pope County. The creek is about 31.8 miles (51.2 km) in length.

The creek is named for Maj. James Lusk and the Lusk family that operated Lusk's Ferry near where the creek enters the Ohio River.

== See also ==
- List of Illinois rivers
