= Panther Creek (Mackinaw River tributary) =

Physical characteristics
- Source
  - location: Woodford County south of Minonk, Illinois
  - coordinates: 40°52′57″N 89°01′32″W
- Mouth
  - location: Confluence with the Mackinaw River southeast of Eureka, Illinois
  - coordinates: 40°39′40″N 89°11′47″W
  - elevation: 630 ft (190 m)
- Length: 26 mi (42 km)

Basin features
- Progression: Panther Creek → Mackinaw → Illinois → Mississippi → Gulf of Mexico
- GNIS ID: 415347

Panther Creek is a large creek (or small river) in the U.S. state of Illinois. It rises near Minonk, and after flowing southwestward approximately 26 miles (42 km), discharges into the Mackinaw River near Eureka. The largest town in the Panther Creek drainage is El Paso, Illinois.

Panther Creek drains much of eastern Woodford County. The creek flows through a region of intense corn and soybean cultivation, formerly part of the Illinois Grande Prairie. Together with the rest of the Mackinaw River's drainage, the creek ultimately feeds the lower Illinois River.

This Panther Creek should not be confused with a much smaller Panther Creek in Cass County, which flows through the Jim Edgar Panther Creek State Fish and Wildlife Area.

== See also ==
- List of Illinois rivers
