= Little Muddy River (Illinois) =

Physical characteristics
- Source
  - location: Richview Township, Washington County, Illinois
  - coordinates: 38°21′56″N 89°12′38″W
- Mouth
  - location: Confluence with the Big Muddy River
  - coordinates: 37°49′07″N 89°11′21″W
- Length: 72.9 mi (117.3 km)

The Little Muddy River is a 72.9-mile-long (117.3 km) tributary of the Big Muddy River in Illinois. It forms the boundary between Franklin and Perry counties.

== Cities and counties ==
The following cities and towns are drained by the Little Muddy:

- Ashley
- DuQuoin
- Radom

The following counties are partly in the Little Muddy watershed:

- Franklin County
- Jackson County
- Jefferson County
- Perry County
- Washington County

== See also ==
- List of Illinois rivers
