= Special districts in Illinois =

Local governments in Illinois

Special districts in Illinois are forms of local government that are responsible for a narrow set of responsibilities, as opposed to counties, townships, and municipal governments which have a wide range of responsibilities. School districts and community college boards are not usually considered special-purpose governments despite their narrow focus on education.

Illinois has the most special districts of any U.S. state. The exact number depends on how one defines a "special district." The United States Census Bureau has determined that Illinois has 3,227 special-purpose governments as of June 30, 2012; the most of any U.S. state. The Office of the Illinois Comptroller, which uses a broader definition that includes special districts without budget autonomy, determined the state has 4,755 as of December 2015.

The various districts may enact ordinances, rules, and regulations to carry out their various duties. Most have police powers to enforce those rules. Special districts have other powers granted to them by relevant laws.

== Active districts ==
=== Airport authorities ===
Illinois state statute authorized the creation of airport authorities July 1, 1945. These authorities are created by the circuit court judge upon voter petition and after hearing and referendum. Each authority is governed by a board of commissioners that is appointed by municipal, county, or state officials depending on criteria specified by the authorizing legislation. Three airport authorities have been created by special acts; Crawford County Airport Authority, Greater Metropolitan Airport Authority of Peoria County and the Metropolitan Airport Authority of Rock Island County.

Authorities may locate, construct, improve, maintain, operate, and lease a public airport and related facilities within their corporate limits or upon adjacent property. Authorities have the power of eminent domain. The tax rate limit is 0.075%. The board may issue debt up to 2.3% of the district's equalized assessed value.

=== Bi-State Metropolitan Development District ===
The Bi-State Metropolitan Development District is an interstate compact formed by Missouri and Illinois in 1949. Since February 2003 the agency has been doing business as Metro. There are ten members of the board; five appointed by local officials from each state. The Census Bureau formally counts this as a special district in Missouri.

=== Cemetery maintenance districts ===
Illinois state statute authorized the creation of cemetery maintenance districts July 1, 1957.

A cemetery maintenance district may be established in any area that lies entirely within a single county. After a petition by voters, a hearing is held in circuit court. The district must be approved by referendum. Each district is governed by a board of trustees appointed by county, municipal, or township officials depending on the area of the district.

=== Chicago Transit Authority ===
Chicago Transit Authority, also known as CTA, is the operator of mass transit in Chicago, Illinois and some of its surrounding suburbs, including the trains of the Chicago "L" and CTA bus service.

=== Civic center authorities ===
Illinois state statute authorized the creation of civic center authorities January 1, 1998. Civic center authorities may be created by local ordinance in cases where a single county or combination of counties has a total equalized assessed value ranging between $300 million and $5 billion. Civic center authorities have the power to plan, sponsor, and finance exhibitions and activities; acquire, own, construct, operate, and maintain real property; appoint and fix compensation of employees; pass ordinances and make rules and regulations; enter into contracts; and assess fines and penalties.

Normally, county chairs appoint board members. In the case of multi-county districts, members are apportioned among the counties by population. The boards of the Will County Metropolitan Exposition and Auditorium Authority and the Metropolitan Pier and Exposition Authority include gubernatorial appointees. The Springfield Metropolitan Exposition and Auditorium Authority is the only popularly elected authority in Illinois with eleven members coming from five districts.

=== Conservation districts ===
Illinois state statute authorized the creation of conservation districts effective August 16, 1963. These districts are established to conserve open spaces for environmental conservation and recreational purposes. Such districts are created upon voter petition to the circuit court of a county with fewer than 1,000,000 in population and having no forest preserve; or upon petition of voters from not more than five counties with no forest preserve, followed by referendum. The district board of trustees is appointed by the chairpersons of the county governing bodies in the district with the consent of the county governing bodies. Conservation districts are authorized to undertake studies and adopt plans pertaining to the resources and facilities of the district. These may include studies of the natural history, archaeology, history, or conservation of the county. Districts may also classify, develop, administer, and maintain all of its areas and facilities and construct, alter, equip, and maintain buildings and other structures. Some of their work is supervised by the Illinois Department of Natural Resources. The board has taxing powers and is allowed to issue debt.

=== Drainage districts ===
Illinois state statute authorized the creation of drainage districts effective January 1, 1956.

=== Fire protection districts ===
Illinois state statute authorized the creation of fire protection districts effective July 8, 1927.

=== Forest preserve districts ===
Illinois state statute authorized the creation of forest preserve districts effective October 1, 1977. The purpose of these districts are to "protect and preserve the flora, fauna, and scenic beauty of" natural lands for recreational and educational purposes. For areas outside of Cook County (the forest preserve district of which was established by a separate statute), "[a]ny contiguous area lying totally within one county that contains one or more natural forests or parks and one or more cities, towns or villages" may be established as a forest preserve district upon the petition of at least 500 voters residing in the proposed district.

=== Hospital districts ===
Illinois state statute authorized the creation of hospital districts effective July 15, 1949. These districts provide and operate hospital facilities in counties of fewer than 1,000,000 in population. The districts are established by the circuit court judge upon voter petition and after referendum. The board of directors of a district located in one county is appointed by the presiding officer of the county board. In districts located in more than one county, the directors represent each county in proportion to its relative population in the district. Districts may issue bonds, levy property taxes, and fix charges for the use of facilities and services. Bond issues may require voter approval.

The state also has hospital township boards. These boards may be created in any township with a population fewer than 500,000 upon voter petition and referendum. Each board of directors is composed of five to eleven members appointed by the township board. The boards may set property taxes, and fix and collect rents and charges. The boards also may issue revenue bonds with voter approval.

=== Library districts ===
Library districts are run by library boards; such boards are elected bodies and have the power to levy taxes in their district. The districts are established by the circuit court judge upon petition of either voters or the board of a local tax supported library and after hearing and referendum. The boundaries of these library districts occasionally coincide with those of another governmental entity, such as a township, but more often, they are set independently. Library systems that serve ten or more public libraries or that consist of a single public library serving a city of more than 500,000 in population may be created upon approval of the board of directors of the participating libraries and the approval of the state librarian. Library systems are governed by a board of five to fifteen directors selected by member libraries, except the board of a public library serving a city of more than 500,000 in population serves as the board.

=== METRA Commuter Rail Board ===
Using Chicago's rail infrastructure, much of which was created in the 19th century, the Illinois General Assembly established the RTA, and later Metra, to serve commuters by rail. Metra's creation was a result of the anticipated failure of commuter service operated and owned by various private railroad companies in the 1970s. Freight rail companies still operate some routes; however, these operations are guided by contracted service agreements. Metra owns all rolling stock and is responsible for all stations along with the respective municipalities. Since its inception, Metra has directed more than $5 billion into the commuter rail system of the Chicago metropolitan area.

=== Mass transit districts ===
Illinois state statute authorized the creation of mass transit districts effective July 21, 1959.

=== Mosquito abatement districts ===
Illinois state statute authorized the creation of mosquito abatement districts effective July 7, 1927. These districts are established by the circuit court judge upon voter petition and after hearing and referendum. Each district is governed by a board of trustees appointed by the county or municipal governing body or the township board of auditors depending on the area in the district. In home rule counties, the chief executive appoints the district trustees. The district boards may levy property taxes.

=== Museum districts ===
Illinois state statute authorized the creation of museum districts effective September 1, 1989. Illinois state statute authorized the creation of county historical museum districts effective January 1, 1990. There is only one of each district. The Byron Museum District and the Wabash County Historical Museum District respectively.

=== Park districts ===
Illinois state statute authorized the creation of park districts effective July 1, 1951. Two or more park districts may create Special Recreation Associations, which are considered a special-purpose government by the U.S. Census Bureau.

=== Port districts ===
Illinois state statute authorized the creation of port districts effective July 1, 1951.

=== Prairie Trail Authority ===
This authority was created by special act to maintain a system of linked pathways and bicycle trails. DuPage, Kane, Lake, McHenry, and Will counties are eligible to participate. The authority is governed by a board of directors appointed by the president of either the local conservation district or local forest preserve district. Each county's number of representatives is based on population. The authority determines the contributions of the member counties.

=== Public building commissions ===
These commissions may be established by resolution of the governing body of any municipality with 3,000 or more inhabitants or by resolution of the county seat or county board of any county and referendum. The governing body consists of a board of five or more commissioners who are appointed by the presiding officers of the participating governments with the consent of the governments. The commissions may collect rentals or other charges and may issue revenue bonds. The creating governments may set and levy property taxes on behalf of the commissions.

=== Public health district ===
Illinois state statute authorized the creation of public health districts effective July 1, 1917. These are not considered special districts by the U.S. Census Bureau.

=== Regional Transportation Authority ===
The Regional Transportation Authority (RTA) is the financial and oversight body for the three transit agencies in northeastern Illinois; the Chicago Transit Authority (CTA), Metra, and Pace, which are called Service Boards in the RTA Act. RTA serves the counties of Cook, DuPage, Kane, Lake, McHenry and Will.

=== Rescue squad districts ===
Illinois state statute authorized the creation of rescue squad districts effective January 1, 1990. Districts to provide rescue services may be established in contiguous areas serving at least 300 persons upon voter petition to the circuit court and after referendum. A board of five trustees governs each district; its members are appointed by the municipal, township, or county governing body depending on the area in the district. If the district includes area in two or more counties, board members are selected by each county in proportion to population. The districts may levy ad valorem taxes.

=== River conservancy districts ===
Illinois state statute authorized the creation of river conservancy districts effective July 11, 1925. Districts to prevent stream pollution, conserve and protect water supplies, and promote public health are established by the circuit court judge upon voter petition and after referendum. A board of trustees governs each district; the trustees are appointed by county, municipal, or township officials depending on the area served and the population of the district. The districts may levy ad valorem taxes up to a specified amount without voter approval and additional taxes with voter approval. The districts may, with voter approval, issue bonds.

=== Sanitary districts ===
Illinois state statute authorized the creation of sanitary districts effective July 1, 1907. Sanitary districts for sewerage were established July 1, 1917. Sanitary districts for drainage and sewage disposal were established July 2, 1936. The largest sanitary district is the Metropolitan Water Reclamation District of Greater Chicago, which oversaw the reversal of the course of the Chicago River.

=== Soil and water conservation districts ===
Illinois state statute authorized the creation of sanitary districts effective July 9, 1937. Soil and water conservation districts may be established by the state department of agriculture, upon voter petition and after hearing and referendum. A board of five directors elected from among landowners in the district governs each district. The district may levy compulsory charges against landowners for work performed.

=== Solid waste disposal districts ===
Illinois state statute authorized the creation of solid waste disposal districts effective July 1, 1907. These districts are authorized by general law to provide and maintain solid waste disposal facilities. The districts may be created coextensive with a single county of fewer than 3,000,000 in population; coextensive with a group of not more than five adjoining counties each with a population of fewer than 3,000,000; coextensive with a single township; or coextensive with a group of not more than five adjoining townships. The districts are established upon voter petition to the circuit court and after hearing and local referendum. In the case of multicounty or multitownship districts, formation must be approved by the state environmental protection agency. A five-member board of trustees, appointed by the presiding officers of the governing bodies served by the district, administers each district. The district board may levy property taxes, charge fees, and with voter approval, issue bonds.

=== Street lighting districts ===
Illinois state statute authorized the creation of street lighting districts effective August 2, 1949. These districts are established by the circuit court judge upon voter petition and after hearing and referendum. A three-member board of trustees is appointed by presiding officer of the county governing board with the board's advice and consent. If the district includes area in two or more counties, board members are selected by each county in proportion to population. The districts may levy ad valorem taxes up to a specified amount without voter approval and additional taxes with voter approval. The districts may, with voter approval, issue bonds.

=== Surface water protection districts ===
Illinois state statute authorized the creation of surface water protection districts effective July 1, 1907. Districts to provide flood control facilities may be established by the circuit court on petition of resident voters after public hearing and local referendum. A five-member district board of trustees is appointed by the county governing body or, in home rule counties, by the chief executive. In districts located in more than one county, the district board is appointed by each respective county governing body in proportion to population. The districts may levy taxes and issue bonds after voter approval.

== Defunct districts ==
=== Addison Creek Restoration Commission ===
The Addison Creek Restoration Commission was established in 1956 by Illinois state statute and abolished in 2015. In 1959, then-Judge Otto Kerner approved the annexation of an industrial park into the district. The district was responsible for keeping a two-mile stretch of Addison Creek clear of debris. The President of the Cook County Board appointed two members and the Mayor of Northlake appointed three members. Initially slated to be terminated January 1, 2010, the district was terminated on January 1, 2015.

=== Quad Cities Interstate Metropolitan Authority ===
This authority was dissolved as of January 2005.

=== School Finance Authority ===
In 1980, the Illinois General Assembly created the Chicago School Finance Authority to oversee finances for the Chicago Board of Education. The authority's fiscal monitoring powers expanded over time to include approving the budgets, financial plans and contracts submitted to the Board of Education. In 1995, Richard M. Daley convinced the Illinois General Assembly to place CPS under the mayor's control. The authority's responsibilities shifted to the administration and oversight of its outstanding bonds. This authority was dissolved in June 2010.

=== Tuberculosis sanitarium districts ===
These districts may be established by the circuit court judge upon voter petition and after hearing and referendum. A board of directors is appointed by the presiding officer of the county governing body with the consent of that body. The districts may levy property taxes and issue bonds. Bond issues for other than the acquisition of land require voter approval. The last such district, Suburban Cook County Tuberculosis Sanitarium District in Forest Park, was terminated August 9, 2013.

== Criticism and reform efforts ==
The small units are also criticized for a lack of transparency and their "patchwork nature" making it difficult for local residents to ascertain which entities are responsible for which services.

In 2012, DuPage County performed a review that found a variety of small units of government that provide mosquito abatement, sanitary and street lighting services cost taxpayers $300 million annually. These districts included small entities such as the one square mile Century Hill Street Lighting District whose board members had wanted to dissolve the district, but were unable to.

In response, Tom Cullerton introduced SB 494 as a pilot program to allow for consolidation of these types of government bodies. The bill would allow the DuPage County Board to pass ordinances to dissolve thirteen small units of government after an audit issued by the County Board Chair was completed. The dissolution of a district could to be overturned via referendum by voters in that district. The bill's cosponsors included suburban legislators and it was supported by Republican County Board Chair Dan Cronin. On April 25, the bill was passed unanimously in the Illinois Senate and on May 6, its house counterpart sponsored by Deb Conroy passed the Illinois House of Representatives with 108 yes votes. The bill was signed into law by Pat Quinn in August. Since then, DuPage County has been able to pass an ordinance to dissolve the Fairview Fire Protection District. In 2015, Representative Jack Franks a co-sponsor of SB 494 proposed legislation to give McHenry and Lake counties the same ability to consolidate small, special purpose districts.

In 2015, Bruce Rauner created a 28-member bipartisan Government Consolidation and Unfunded Mandates Task Force chaired by Evelyn Sanguinetti, then the Lieutenant Governor of Illinois with a focus on reducing unfunded mandates and promoting consolidation of special districts.
