= Beaucoup Creek =

Location
- Country: United States
- State: Illinois

Physical characteristics
- Source
  - location: Near Beaucoup, Washington County, Illinois
  - coordinates: 38°21′36″N 89°17′33″W
- Mouth: Big Muddy River
  - location: Near Murphysboro, Jackson County, Illinois
  - coordinates: 37°47′01″N 89°16′29″W
- Length: 82 mi (132 km)

Beaucoup Creek is a major tributary of the Big Muddy River in Illinois. The name is pronounced locally as in "Ba Cou".

Beaucoup Creek is 82 miles (132 km) in length.

== Cities and counties ==
The following cities are in the Beaucoup Creek watershed:

- Pinckneyville
- Vergennes

Parts of the following counties are drained by Beaucoup Creek:

- Jackson County
- Perry County
- Washington County

== See also ==
- List of Illinois rivers
