= Little Wabash River =

Wabash River tributary in Illinois

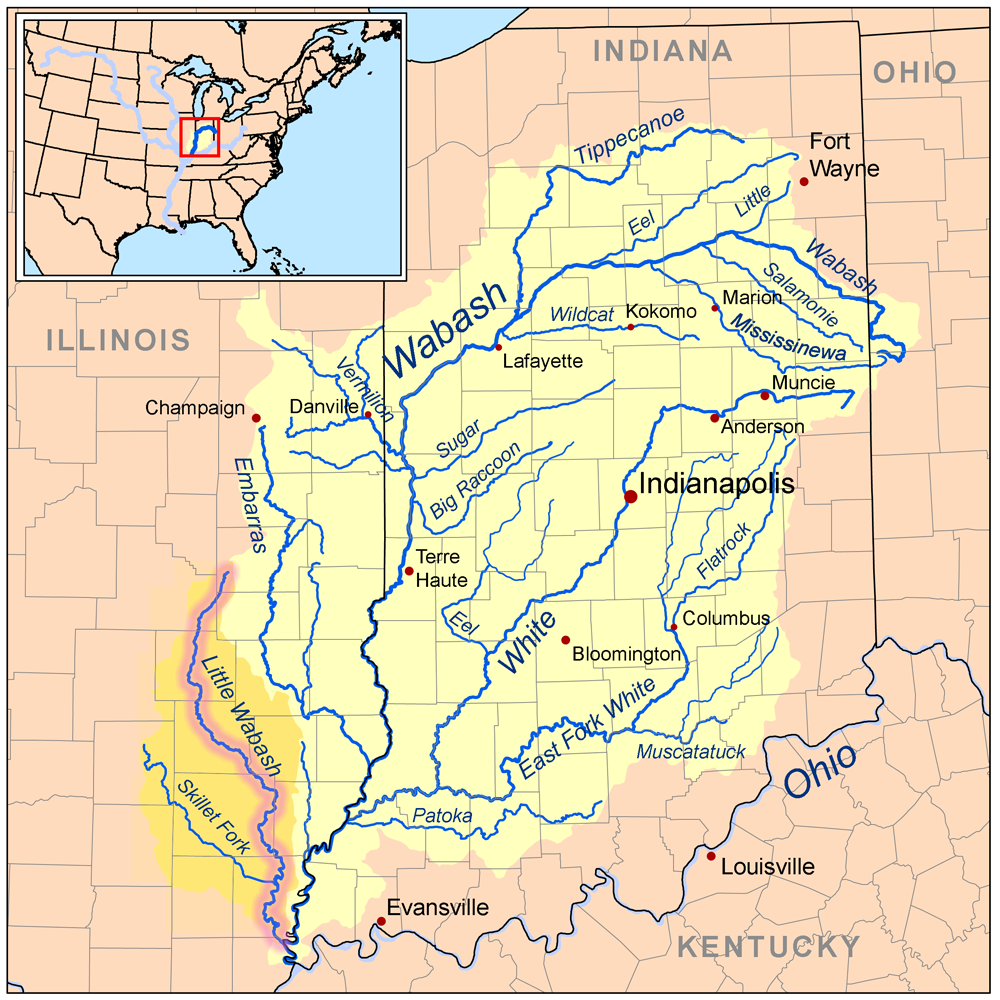
- Map of the Little Wabash River highlighted within the Wabash River watershed

Physical characteristics
- Source
  - location: Coles County west of Mattoon, Illinois
  - coordinates: 39°28′31″N 88°27′30″W
- Mouth
  - location: Confluence with the Wabash River near New Haven, Illinois
  - coordinates: 37°53′27″N 88°05′40″W
  - elevation: 341 ft (104 m)
- Length: 242 mi (389 km)
- Discharge
  - location: Carmi, IL
  - average: 2,978 cu/ft. per sec.

Basin features
- Progression: Little Wabash → Wabash → Ohio → Mississippi → Gulf of Mexico
- GNIS ID: 412430

West Branch Little Wabash River

Physical characteristics
- Source
  - location: Shelby County southeast of Windsor
  - coordinates: 39°25′08″N 88°32′46″W
- Mouth
  - location: Confluence with the Little Wabash River, Shelby County, Illinois
  - coordinates: 39°17′49″N 88°32′45″W
  - elevation: 568 ft (173 m)

Basin features
- Progression: West Branch → Little Wabash → Wabash → Ohio → Mississippi → Gulf of Mexico
- GNIS ID: 420792

The Little Wabash River is a 240-mile-long (390 km) tributary of the Wabash River in east-central and southeastern Illinois in the United States. Via the Wabash and Ohio rivers, it is part of the watershed of the Mississippi River. It is the third largest tributary after the White River and the Embarras River.

== Course ==
The Little Wabash rises in Coles County near Mattoon and flows generally southwardly through Shelby, Effingham, Clay, Richland, Wayne, Edwards and White counties, past the towns of Louisville, Golden Gate, Carmi and New Haven. It enters the Wabash River on the common boundary of White and Gallatin counties, about 4 miles (6 km) southeast of New Haven.

In its upper course in Shelby County, the river is dammed to form Lake Mattoon and collects the short West Branch Little Wabash River, which flows for its entire length in Shelby County. Other tributaries include the Fox River, which joins it in Edwards County; the Elm River, which joins it in Wayne County; and the Skillet Fork, which joins it in White County.

== See also ==
- List of Illinois rivers
- Watersheds of Illinois
