= Little Menominee River =

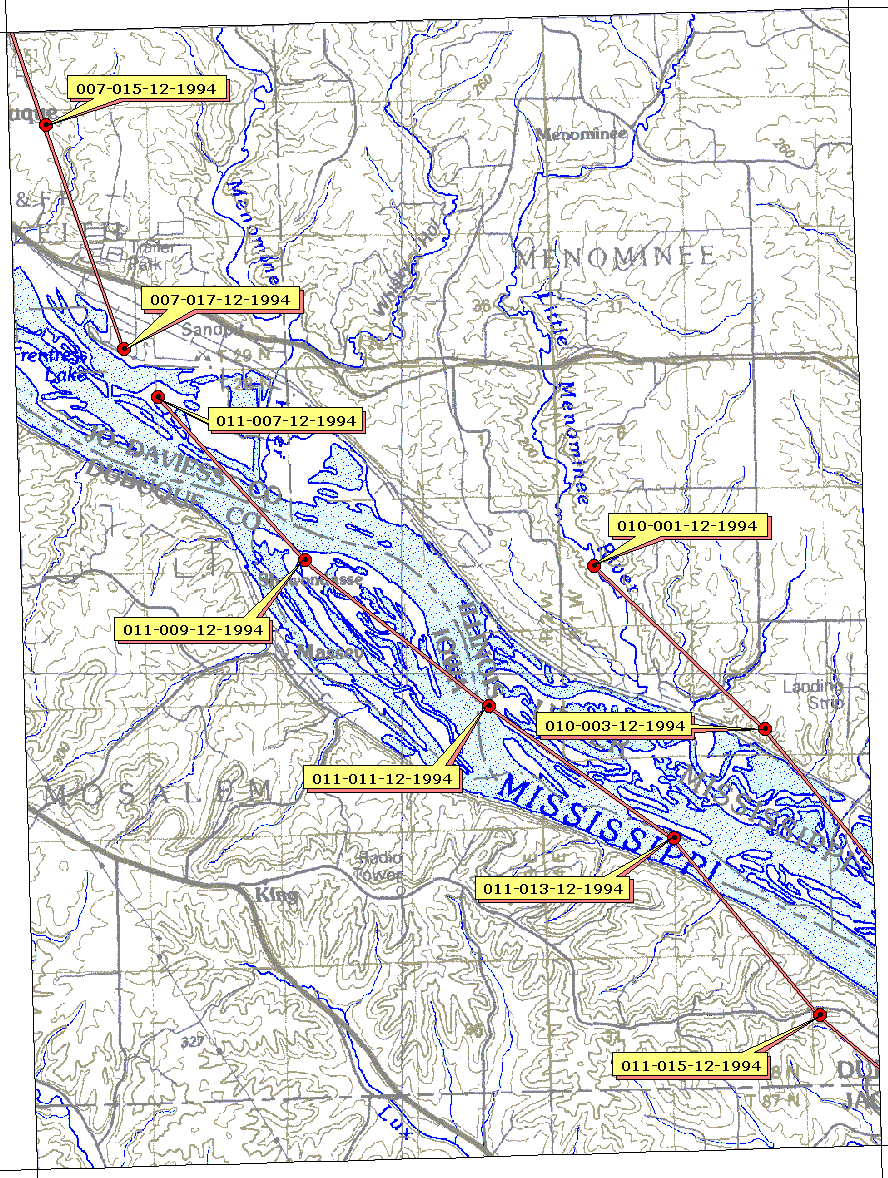
- Little Menominee River (USGS)

Physical characteristics
- Source
  - location: Grant County, northwest of Hazel Green, Wisconsin
  - coordinates: 42°33′42″N 90°32′10″W
  - elevation: 943 ft (287 m)
- Mouth
  - location: Confluence with the Mississippi west of Galena, Illinois
  - coordinates: 42°25′31″N 90°32′04″W
  - elevation: 591 ft (180 m)
- Length: 14 mi (23 km)

Basin features
- Progression: Little Menominee River → Mississippi → Gulf of Mexico
- GNIS ID: 412371

The Little Menominee River is a 13.9-mile-long (22.4 km) tributary of the Upper Mississippi River, which it joins in Jo Daviess County, Illinois.

The Little Menominee rises in Grant County, Wisconsin. It flows south, to the east of the Menominee River, into Illinois. It crosses the northwestern corner of Illinois for about six miles before joining the Mississippi at the southern end of East Dubuque. The town of Menominee, Illinois is located on the river.

The name "Menominee" refers to the Menominee, a Native American people. The name means "good seed" or "wild rice".

The river is part of the Driftless Area of Illinois and Wisconsin. This region escaped the glaciation experienced by areas to the east and west during the last ice age.

== See also ==
- List of Illinois rivers
- List of Wisconsin rivers
