= North Fork Embarras River =

Physical characteristics
- Source
  - location: Edgar County southeast of Kansas, Illinois
  - coordinates: 39°31′03″N 87°54′00″W
- Mouth
  - location: Confluence with the Embarras River southeast of Ste. Marie, Illinois
  - coordinates: 38°55′00″N 87°59′18″W
  - elevation: 459 ft (140 m)
- Length: 64 mi (103 km)
- Discharge
  - location: Oblong, Illinois
  - average: 316 cu/ft. per sec.

Basin features
- Progression: North Fork Embarras River → Embarras → Wabash → Ohio → Mississippi → Gulf of Mexico
- GNIS ID: 414596

The North Fork Embarras River is a 64.0-mile-long (103.0 km) stream which originates in Edgar County, Illinois, and flows through Clark, Crawford and Jasper counties. Its confluence with the Embarras River is located near the town of Ste. Marie in Jasper County. It is a major tributary to the Embarras River. The North Fork's main tributary is Panther Creek, located in Jasper County.

The area has seen extensive agriculture and is also an area rich in oil. There are many oil wells and pumps along the river although the peak of oil production in the area occurred in the 1930s.

The surrounding area is largely agricultural, and river stages change dramatically due to agricultural runoff. It flows through a mostly wooded corridor and some river bottom farmland. The stream bed is composed mostly of sand with some glacial till, hard clay, and mud. Fallen trees and log jams are common. Pools and rivers may change drastically after heavy flooding. Large sandbars are not uncommon. There is some siltation and mild to extreme bank erosion in areas due to agriculture. There are very isolated occurrences of sandstone outcroppings along the stream bed and banks.

The mean daily discharge for the North Fork is 698 cu ft/s (19.8 m^{3}/s), although it may reach a flow rate of over 6,000 cu ft/s (170 m^{3}/s) during floodstage.

== Ecology ==
There is a diversity of wildlife along the North Fork Embarras River. Deer, turkey, coyotes, foxes, squirrels and raccoons are common along the corridor, and there have been sightings of bobcats.

Several mountain lion sightings have been reported over the years, though no evidence has been found to support such claims. A widely popular story among the locals is of the "Wild Woman of North Fork" which can be heard screaming sometimes late at night. This may in fact be the call of a mountain lion which often sounds like a woman crying, although bobcats and foxes may make similar noises. The North Fork's main tributary is named Panther Creek, suggesting that at one time mountain lions may have inhabited the area.

Beaver, otter and mink were nearly trapped out in the 1950s and 60s, but all three have made successful comebacks due to less trapping, habitat recovery and reintroductions. Common birds include waterfowl such as wood ducks and wading birds such as great blue herons and sandpipers. The river corridor and surrounding wetlands are important for migrating geese. There are numerous woodpeckers and songbirds. There are several common birds of prey including red-tailed hawks, great horned owls and barred owls. Bald eagles have been sighted.

Due to the North Fork's variety of stream bed substrates and gradients, there is a wider variety of fish species than may be found in other streams in the region. Several species of Darters (genus Etheostoma and Percina) are common. Minnows include sand shiners, steelcolor shiners, silverjaw minnows and brook silversides. Blackstripe topminnows and mosquitofish are very common along the margins. Madtoms, bullhead and channel catfish are also common. Several sunfish species including long-eared sunfish, crappie, largemouth bass and spotted bass are also found. Non-game fish such as white suckers, common carp, and long-nosed and short-nosed gar are numerous.

The dominant trees along the river's edge are sycamore and cottonwood, along with silver maple, sugar maple, sassafras and mulberry. The surrounding bottomland is dominated by shagbark hickory and white oak.

== Conservation ==
Over the past few years efforts have been made to cut back on erosion due to agriculture. Less productive bottomland fields are being reverted to brush land and wetlands, and shallow ponds have been created for migrating waterfowl. These improvements to the surrounding landscape will ultimately improve the overall condition and diversity of the system.

== See also ==
- List of rivers of Illinois
