= Kyte River =

Physical characteristics
- Source
  - location: Ogle County, north of Rochelle, Illinois
  - coordinates: 42°00′49″N 89°04′44″W
- Mouth
  - location: Confluence with Rock River south of Oregon, Illinois
  - coordinates: 41°59′17″N 89°19′13″W
  - elevation: 673 ft (205 m)
- Length: 32 mi (51 km)

Basin features
- Progression: Kyte River → Rock → Mississippi → Gulf of Mexico
- GNIS ID: 411632

The Kyte River is a tributary of the Rock River, about 32 miles (51 km) long, in northern Illinois in the United States. It is sometimes known locally as "Kyte Creek". Via the Rock River, it is part of the watershed of the Mississippi River.

The Kyte River flows for its entire length in Ogle County. It rises about 7 miles (11 km) north of Rochelle and initially flows southward through that city. Below Rochelle it turns northwestward and enters the Rock River from the east about 3 miles (5 km) south of the city of Oregon.

== See also ==
- List of Illinois rivers
