= Somonauk Creek =

Location
- Country: United States
- State: Illinois

Physical characteristics
- Source: Spring (hydrosphere)
  - location: Afton Township, DeKalb County, Illinois, United States
  - coordinates: 41°49′7″N 88°46′55″W
- Mouth: Fox River (Illinois River tributary)
  - location: Sheridan, Illinois, United States
  - coordinates: 41°32′23″N 88°41′8″W
  - elevation: 531 ft (162 m)
- Length: 36 mi (58 km)

Somonauk Creek is a tributary of the Fox River, which it joins in the Northville Township part of Sheridan, Illinois, United States. Somonauk Creek is approximately 36 miles (58 km) in length, and its source is 3.5 mi (6 km) north of Waterman. It has been dammed to form Lake Holiday, south of the village of Somonauk. The lake is the second lake in the City of Sandwich, with the first, Lake Davis, having been drained in the early 1900s to create usable farmland. The community later needed a lake to replace the one it lost, so in agreement with the Village of Somonauk, the community decided to place a dam on Somonauk Creek to form the new lake. The lake was marketed to the suburbs of Chicago as a recreation spot, with the community later making it a permanent subdivision, with housing located around the whole lake.

== Cities, towns and counties ==
The following cities, towns and villages are within the Somonauk watershed:

- Somonauk
- Waterman
- Sheridan (Partial)

The following Illinois counties are partly drained by Somonauk Creek:

- DeKalb
- LaSalle

== See also ==
- List of rivers of Illinois
