= Little Vermilion River (Wabash River tributary) =

The Little Vermilion River is a 59.6-mile-long (95.9 km) tributary of the Wabash River. The Little Vermilion rises in southern Vermilion County, Illinois, flowing eastward past Georgetown, Illinois, into Vermillion County, Indiana, where it joins the Wabash near Newport.

There is a second river in Illinois that bears the same name: the Little Vermilion River (Illinois River tributary).

The Little Vermilion drains a small portion of northern Edgar County, Illinois. The watershed also extends into Champaign County, Illinois, via drainage ditches.

== See also ==
- List of Illinois rivers
- List of Indiana rivers
