= Fox River (Little Wabash tributary) =

Physical characteristics
- Source
  - location: Jasper County southeast of Newton, Illinois
  - coordinates: 38°57′08″N 88°07′31″W
- Mouth
  - location: Confluence with the Little Wabash River, Edwards County, Illinois
  - coordinates: 38°32′08″N 88°08′19″W
  - elevation: 381 ft (116 m)
- Length: 46.4 mi (74.7 km)

Basin features
- Progression: Fox River → Little Wabash → Wabash → Ohio → Mississippi → Gulf of Mexico
- GNIS ID: 408638

The Fox River is a tributary of the Little Wabash River in southern Illinois. It rises in Jasper County to the southeast of Newton and flows south past Olney, then joins the Little Wabash at the northeast corner of Edwards County, near Mt. Erie. The river is 46.4 miles (74.7 km) in length.

There is a smaller "Fox River" that is a tributary of the Wabash River in southern Illinois, entering the Wabash near New Harmony, Indiana.

== Cities, towns and counties ==
The following cities, towns and villages are in the Fox River watershed:

- Olney

The following counties are at least partially drained by the Fox River:

- Edwards
- Jasper
- Richland
- Wayne

== Lakes and recreational areas ==
- East Fork Lake
- Olney Lake
- Richland County Public Hunting Area

== See also ==
- List of Illinois rivers
