= Drum Hill Branch =

Stream in St. Clair County, Illinois

Coordinates: 38°21′32″N 89°49′39″W

Drum Hill Branch is a stream in St. Clair County in the U.S. state of Illinois. It is a tributary of the Kaskaskia River.

According to tradition, Drum Hill Branch received its name from the regular drum rolls performed by a local settler.

== See also ==
- List of rivers of Illinois
