= Mackinaw River State Fish and Wildlife Area =

State park in Illinois, US

- IUCN category IV (habitat/species management area)
- Location within Illinois Location within the United States
- Location: Tazewell County, Illinois, US
- Nearest city: Mackinaw, Illinois
- Coordinates: 40°33′46″N 89°19′15″W
- Area: 1,448 acres (586 ha)
- Governing body: Illinois Department of Natural Resources

The Mackinaw River State Fish and Wildlife Area is a 1,448-acre (586 ha) state park in Tazewell County, Illinois. It is operated by the Illinois Department of Natural Resources (IDNR). The Area dates to 1970, when a conservation group based in Bloomington, the Parklands Foundation, donated its acreage to the state.

The Mackinaw River SFWA consists of more than two square miles of upslope on the south bank of the Mackinaw River, primarily wooded land with some upland meadows. There are also two sections of Mackinaw River bottomland that offer direct access to the river; each section is approximately 1/4-mile (400 m) wide. The Mackinaw River SWFA is primarily managed for the hunting of whitetail deer, although fishing and canoeing are also welcomed.

The Mackinaw River is a free-running river throughout most of its length, and therefore offers potential for the preservation of fish and shellfish species (particularly mussels) historically associated with the tallgrass prairie. However, most of the river's drainage is heavily utilized for crop farming, with its potential for erosion and consequent siltation. Sixty-six percent of the river's drainage is cropland. The Mackinaw River State Fish and Wildlife Area is an island of natural drainage into the vulnerable river, although it takes up less than 1.2% of the river's total watershed.

The nearest town to the Mackinaw River SFWA is Mackinaw, Illinois.
