= Killbuck Creek (Kishwaukee River tributary) =

Physical characteristics
- Source
  - location: Malta Township, DeKalb County east of Creston, Illinois
  - coordinates: 41°56′18″N 88°56′06″W
  - elevation: 848 ft (258 m)
- Mouth
  - coordinates: 42°10′15″N 89°06′40″W
  - elevation: 686 ft (209 m)
- Length: 28 mi (45 km)

Basin features
- Progression: Killbuck Creek → Kishwaukee → Rock → Mississippi → Gulf of Mexico
- GNIS ID: 424443

Killbuck Creek is a 28-mile-long (45 km) tributary of the Kishwaukee River in northern Illinois, United States.

== Course ==
The creek runs north through southeastern Ogle County, where it cuts through Galena limestone and blue limestone. The Killbuck passes through Pine Rock Township, where a stone quarry was once located. The mouth of Killbuck Creek is located about 1 mile (1.6 km) north of Kilbuck Bluffs Forest Preserve, a Winnebago County park. In terms of square miles drained, Killbuck Creek is the third largest tributary of the Kishwaukee River behind the South Branch Kishwaukee River and Coon Creek.
