= Lake Mattoon =

- Location within Illinois Location within the United States
- Location: Coles County, Illinois; Cumberland County, Illinois; Shelby County, Illinois
- Coordinates: 39°21′22″N 88°28′10″W
- Type: reservoir
- Primary inflows: Little Wabash River
- Primary outflows: Little Wabash River
- Basin countries: United States
- Max. length: 4 mi (6.4 km)
- Max. width: 0.5 mi (0.80 km)
- Surface area: 1,050 acres (420 ha)
- Average depth: 10.5 ft (3.2 m)
- Max. depth: 35 ft (11 m)
- Water volume: 2,600,000,000 US gal (0.0098 km^{3})
- Shore length^{1}: 55.5 mi (89.3 km)
- Surface elevation: 630 ft (192 m)
- ^{1} Shore length is not a well-defined measure.

Lake Mattoon is a 1,050-acre (4.2 km^{2}) reservoir located in Coles County, Illinois, Cumberland County, Illinois, and Shelby County, Illinois. Almost three-quarters of the lake, 765 acres (3.10 km^{2}), is located in Shelby County. The reservoir was built to supply tap water to Mattoon and Neoga, but also provides fishing and boating recreation. The lake is 4 miles (6.4 km) long and 0.5 miles (0.80 km) wide.

The lake is owned by the city of Mattoon. Boaters must buy a permit to use the lake. There is no power limit on the lake, which welcomes waterskiers. The lake is stocked with bass, bluegill, catfish, and crappie. The nearest Interstate access is Exit 177 on Interstate 57.

A large Reliant Energy electricity generating plant stands adjacent to the lake.
