= Elm River (Illinois) =

Physical characteristics
- Source
  - location: Confluence of Elm Creek and Raccoon Creek southeast of Flora, Illinois
  - coordinates: 38°35′58″N 88°24′47″W
- Mouth
  - location: Confluence with the Little Wabash River east of Fairfield, Illinois
  - coordinates: 38°23′41″N 88°13′29″W
  - elevation: 371 ft (113 m)
- Length: 29.2 mi (47.0 km)

Basin features
- Progression: Elm River → Little Wabash → Wabash → Ohio → Mississippi → Gulf of Mexico
- GNIS ID: 407937

The Elm River is a 29-mile-long (47 km) tributary of the Little Wabash River in southeastern Illinois in the United States. Via the Little Wabash, Wabash and Ohio rivers, it is part of the watershed of the Mississippi River.

The Elm flows for its entire length in Wayne County. It is formed by the confluence of Elm Creek and Raccoon Creek, which flow from Clay County, and thence flows generally southeastwardly to its confluence with the Little Wabash. Portions of the stream's lower course have been channelized and re-routed to drainage ditches.

The Raccoon Creek Power Plant, a combustion turbine generator (CTG)-type Ameren power plant, is located on Raccoon Creek in Clay County.

== See also ==
- List of Illinois rivers
