= Skillet Fork =

Physical characteristics
- Source
  - location: Marion County southwest of Farina, Illinois
  - coordinates: 38°48′11″N 88°43′06″W
- Mouth
  - location: Confluence with the Little Wabash River northeast of Carmi, Illinois
  - coordinates: 38°07′53″N 88°07′32″W
  - elevation: 361 ft (110 m)
- Length: 98 mi (158 km)

Basin features
- Progression: Skillet Fork → Little Wabash → Wabash → Ohio → Mississippi → Gulf of Mexico
- GNIS ID: 418570

Skillet Fork is a 98-mile-long (158 km) river in southern Illinois in the United States. It is a tributary of the Little Wabash River; via the Little Wabash, Wabash and Ohio rivers, it is part of the watershed of the Mississippi River.

The Skillet Fork rises in northeastern Marion County and flows generally southeastwardly through Clay, Wayne, Hamilton and White counties. In its lower course, parts of the river have been straightened and channelized. It joins the Little Wabash River 5 miles (8 km) upstream of Carmi.

== See also ==
- List of Illinois rivers
