= East Branch South Branch Kishwaukee River =

Physical characteristics
- Source
  - location: Plato Township, Kane County, Illinois
  - coordinates: 41°59′38″N 88°27′48″W
  - elevation: 978 ft (298 m)
- Mouth
  - location: Confluence with the South Branch Kishwaukee northwest of Sycamore, Illinois
  - coordinates: 42°00′38″N 88°43′25″W
  - elevation: 820 ft (250 m)
- Length: 24 mi (39 km)

Basin features
- Progression: East Branch South Branch Kishwaukee River → South Branch Kishwaukee → Kishwaukee → Rock → Mississippi → Gulf of Mexico
- GNIS ID: 421769

East Branch South Branch Kishwaukee River, in northern Illinois, is a 23.7-mile-long (38.1 km) tributary of the Kishwaukee River, by way of the South Branch Kishwaukee River.
