= Little Mackinaw River =

Physical characteristics
- Source
  - location: Danvers Township, McLean County, Illinois
  - coordinates: 40°32′06″N 89°14′47″W
- Mouth
  - location: Confluence with the Mackinaw River in Tazewell County near Hopedale, Illinois
  - coordinates: 40°26′32″N 89°27′42″W
  - elevation: 538 ft (164 m)
- Length: 19 mi (31 km)

Basin features
- Progression: Little Mackinaw River → Mackinaw → Illinois → Mississippi → Gulf of Mexico
- GNIS ID: 412369

The Little Mackinaw River is an 18.5-mile-long (29.8 km) river in the U.S. state of Illinois. It is a tributary of the Mackinaw River, which it joins near Hopedale in Tazewell County. The river's name is derived from the Ojibwe word mikinaak meaning "turtle".

== Cities, towns and counties ==
The following cities, towns and villages are drained by the Little Mackinaw:

- Danvers
- Hopedale

The following Illinois counties are in part drained by the Little Mackinaw:

- McLean
- Tazewell

== See also ==
- List of Illinois rivers
