= La Moine River =

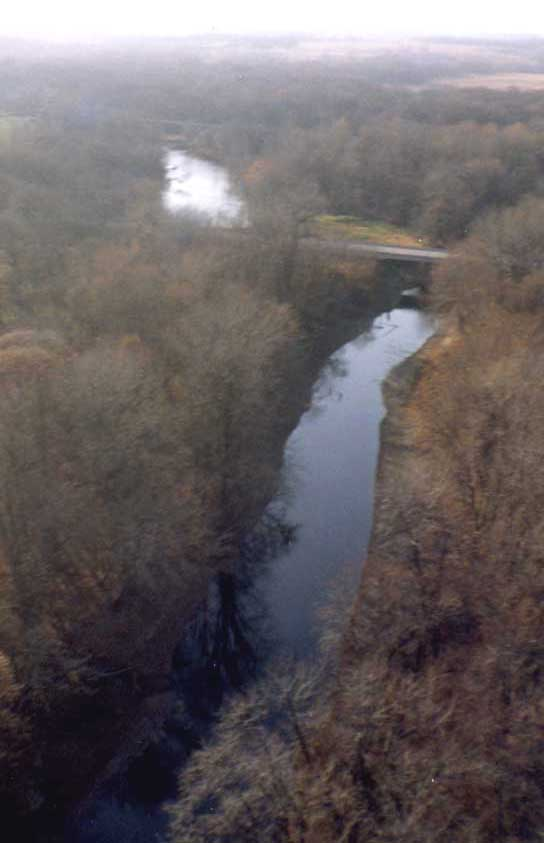
- La Moine River in McDonough County, Illinois near Colmar, Illinois

Physical characteristics
- Source
  - location: Warren County southwest of Galesburg, Illinois
  - coordinates: 40°38′28″N 90°45′32″W
- Mouth
  - location: Confluence with the Illinois River southwest of Beardstown, Illinois
  - coordinates: 39°59′14″N 90°30′50″W
  - elevation: 440 ft (130 m)
- Length: 125 mi (201 km)
- Discharge
  - location: Ripley, Illinois
  - average: 884 cu/ft. per sec.

Basin features
- Progression: La Moine River → Illinois River → Mississippi River → Gulf of Mexico
- GNIS ID: 411649

La Moine River is a 125-mile-long (201 km) tributary of the Illinois River in western Illinois in the United States. Its watershed covers approximately 2,000 square miles (5,000 km^{2}), and it is the sixth-largest tributary to the Illinois River. It is part of the watershed of the Mississippi River.

== Course ==
La Moine River rises in southwestern Warren County and initially flows southwestwardly through southeastern Henderson and northwestern McDonough counties into Hancock County, where it turns to the southeast and flows through McDonough and Schuyler counties. In its lower course the river passes the village of Ripley and is used to define a portion of the boundary between Schuyler and Brown counties. It flows into the Illinois River from the northwest, about 4 miles (6 km) southwest of Beardstown.

In its headwaters region the river collects the short South Branch La Moine River, which rises in McDonough County and flows west-southwestwardly into Hancock County, past La Harpe. In Hancock County it collects the East Fork La Moine River, which rises in Warren County and flows south- and southwestwardly through McDonough County, past Macomb.

== Variant names ==
The United States Board on Geographic Names settled on "La Moine River" as the river's official name in 1933. According to the Geographic Names Information System, the river has also been known as:

- Crooked Creek
- Lamoine River
- Lamoine Creek
- Rivière à la Moine or Rivière au Moine (Monk river)
- Rivière à la Mine (Mine river)

== Conservation ==
- La Moine River Ecosystem Partnership A collaboration of more than 25 public and private organizations, landowners, and residents dedicated to the protection, restoration, and stewardship of the natural resources of the La Moine River watershed and adjacent areas.

== See also ==
- List of Illinois rivers

== Sources ==
- Columbia Gazetteer of North America entry
- DeLorme (2003). Illinois Atlas & Gazetteer. Yarmouth, Maine: DeLorme. ISBN 0-89933-321-4.
- U.S. Geological Survey Geographic Names Information System: La Moine River
