= Plum River =

Physical characteristics
- Source
  - location: Jo Daviess County southeast of Stockton, Illinois
  - coordinates: 42°20′31″N 89°59′39″W
  - elevation: 988 ft (301 m)
- Mouth
  - location: Confluence with the Mississippi at Savanna, Illinois
  - coordinates: 42°05′14″N 90°09′15″W
  - elevation: 584 ft (178 m)
- Length: 47 mi (76 km)

Basin features
- Progression: Plum River → Mississippi → Gulf of Mexico
- GNIS ID: 415959

The Plum River is a tributary of the Mississippi River, about 46.6 miles (75.0 km) long, in northwestern Illinois in the United States. It rises in Jo Daviess County and flows generally south-southwestwardly into Carroll County, where it joins the Mississippi at Savanna. Among its several short tributaries are:

- The East Plum River, which rises in Stephenson County and flows southwestwardly into Carroll County, joining the Plum at 42°10′16″N 90°01′20″W
- The Muddy Plum River, which flows for its entire length in Jo Daviess County. It joins the Plum River at 42°13′35″N 90°01′45″W
- The Middle Fork Plum River joins the Plum River at 42°16′29″N 90°02′12″W
- The North Fork Plum River has its confluence with the Plum River at 42°15′46″N 90°02′33″W

== See also ==
- List of Illinois rivers
