= Salt Creek (Des Plaines River tributary) =

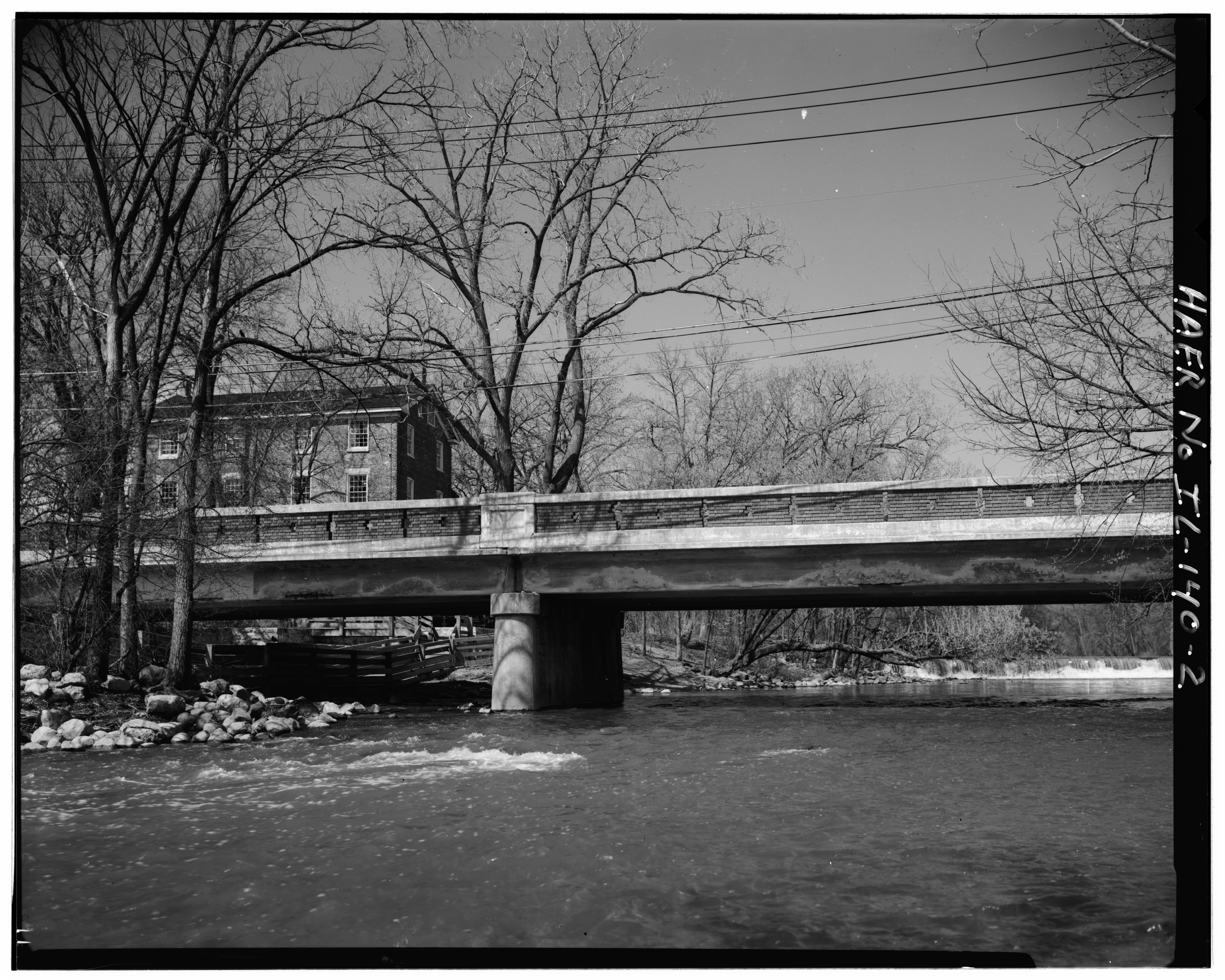
- Creek showing York Road/Fullersburg Bridge and Graue Mill

Physical characteristics
- Source
  - location: Elk Grove Village, Illinois
  - coordinates: 42°05′58″N 88°06′41″W
- Mouth
  - location: Confluence with the Des Plaines River, Lyons, Illinois
  - coordinates: 41°49′06″N 87°49′57″W
  - elevation: 607 ft (185 m)
- Length: 43 mi (69 km)

Basin features
- Progression: Salt Creek → Des Plaines → Illinois → Mississippi → Gulf of Mexico
- GNIS ID: 422069

Salt Creek is a 43.4-mile-long (69.8 km) stream in northeastern Illinois. It is an important tributary of the Des Plaines River, part of the Illinois River and ultimately the Mississippi River watersheds. It rises in northwest Cook County at Wilke Marsh in Palatine and flows in a meandering course generally southward through DuPage County, returning to central Cook County and emptying into the Des Plaines River in Lyons, Illinois. Most of the creek's watershed is urbanized, densely populated and flood-prone. Tributary streams include Addison Creek.

It was originally known to European settlers as the Little Des Plaines River but was given the name Salt Creek in the mid-nineteenth century after a large wagonload of salt spilled in the waterway. Some of the species of fish in the creek include carp, smallmouth bass, northern pike, bluegill/sunfish minnow/shad, and bullhead catfish. The Graue Mill, a historic gristmill, stands on the bank of the creek in Oak Brook.

== Flood control efforts ==
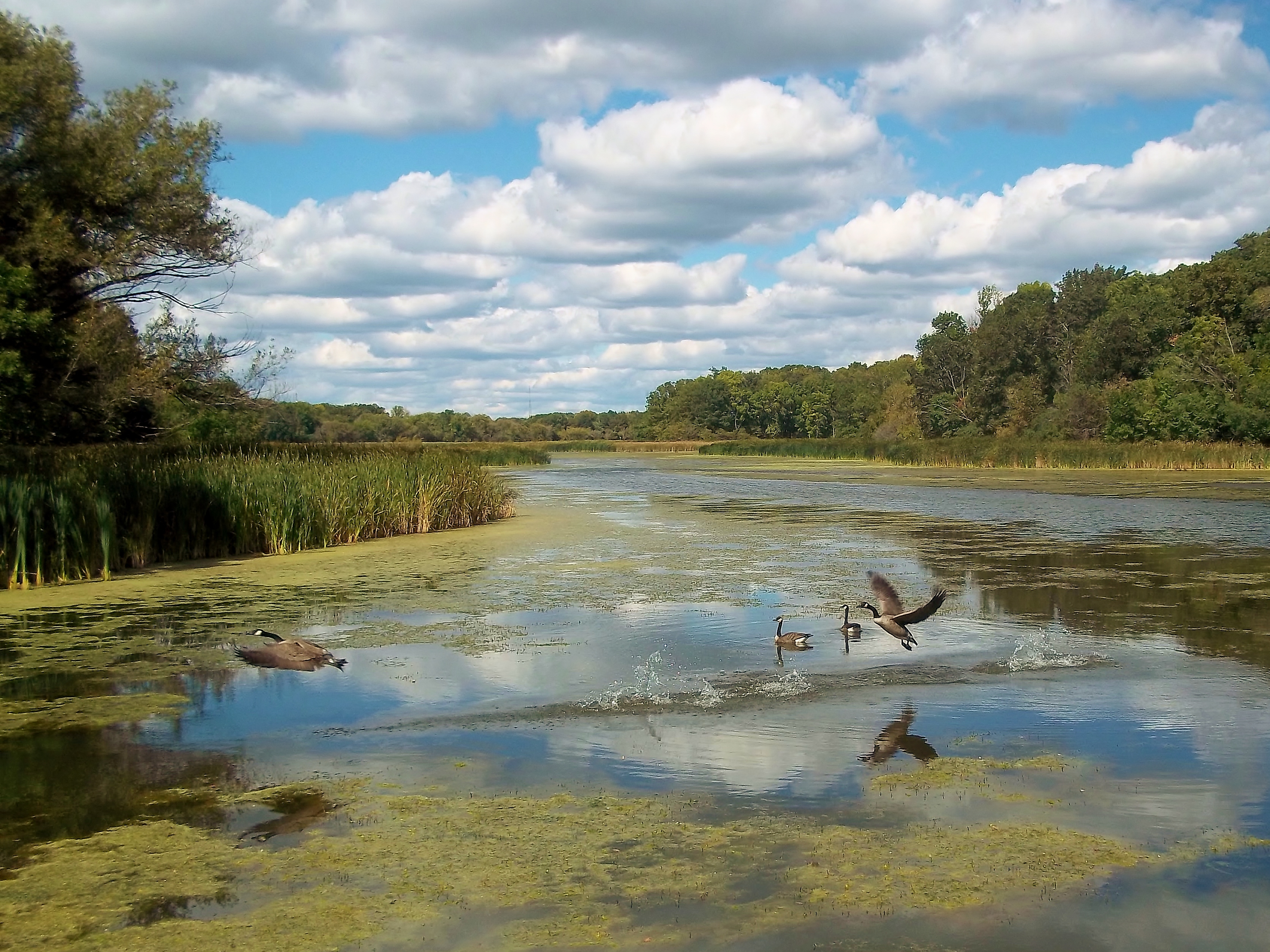
Busse Lake

Parts of the creek were modified and straightened during the 1960s and 1970s. Flood control dams were constructed along the creek in 1978 within the Ned Brown Forest Preserve near Elk Grove Village, Illinois, creating the 590-acre (2.4 km^{2}) Busse Lake. A diversion tunnel was constructed approximately 1.6 miles (2.6 km) north of the confluence with the Des Plaines River, at a point where the two streams are separated by only 1,600 feet (490 m).

After a 1987 storm dumped almost 10 inches of rain on the Chicagoland area, DuPage County built several reservoirs throughout the Salt Creek basin, mostly north of Elmhurst. In Elmhurst, a reservoir was established at the Elmhurst Quarry site to divert creek water. Able to hold 2.7 billion gallons of water, the quarry reservoir is one of the largest non-Federal flood-control reservoirs in the United States.

== See also ==
- List of Illinois rivers
- Forest Preserve District of DuPage County
- Forest Preserve District of Cook County
- Salt Creek Trail
