= Henderson Creek (Illinois) =

Physical characteristics
- Source
  - location: Knox County west of Wataga, Illinois
  - coordinates: 41°01′57″N 90°18′11″W
- Mouth
  - location: Gladstone Township, Henderson County, Illinois
  - coordinates: 40°52′31″N 91°01′51″W
  - elevation: 525 ft (160 m)
- Length: 65 mi (105 km)
- Discharge
  - location: Oquawka, Illinois
  - average: 318 cu/ft. per sec.

Basin features
- Progression: Henderson Creek → Mississippi → Gulf of Mexico
- GNIS ID: 410049

Henderson Creek is a 64.6-mile-long (104.0 km) tributary of the Mississippi River, which it joins in Henderson County, Illinois, near the villages of Gladstone and Oquawka.

Henderson Creek rises in Knox County northwest of Wataga and flows west. South Henderson Creek joins the stream in eastern Warren County, and Middle Henderson Creek joins farther west in Warren County. The creek continues west, entering Henderson County, where it receives North Henderson Creek and Cedar Creek. Approximately 3 miles (5 km) downstream, Henderson Creek breaks through the bluffs forming the edge of the Mississippi River valley and proceeds 10 miles (16 km) farther southwest, running parallel to the Mississippi and collecting several small streams running off the bluffs, including Fall Creek and Jinks Creek.

== Cities, towns and counties ==
The following cities, towns and villages are drained by Henderson Creek:

- Alexis
- Biggsville
- Galesburg
- Gladstone
- Henderson
- Kirkwood
- Little York
- Monmouth
- North Henderson
- Rio
- Seaton

The following counties are at least partly in the Henderson Creek basin:

- Henderson
- Knox
- Mercer
- Warren

== Parks and entry points ==
- Big River State Forest near Oquawka
- Oquawka State Wildlife Refuge

== See also ==
- List of Illinois rivers
