= North Branch Kishwaukee River =

River in Illinois, United States

Physical characteristics
- Source
  - location: McHenry County northeast of Harvard, Illinois
  - coordinates: 42°26′49″N 88°32′17″W
  - elevation: 966 ft (294 m)
- Mouth
  - location: Confluence with the Kishwaukee east of Marengo, Illinois
  - coordinates: 42°15′57″N 88°33′04″W
  - elevation: 810 ft (250 m)
- Length: 17 mi (27 km)

Basin features
- Progression: North Branch Kishwaukee River → Kishwaukee → Rock → Mississippi → Gulf of Mexico
- GNIS ID: 414567

The North Branch Kishwaukee River is a 17.1-mile-long (27.5 km) tributary of the Kishwaukee River in northern Illinois.

== Course ==
The North Branch Kishwaukee River northeast of Harvard, Illinois and flows south through McHenry County. to join the Kishwaukee River east of Marengo. It drains approximately 40 square miles (100 km^{2}) of land area, flowing for 17 miles.

== Description ==
The North Branch Kishwaukee River flows in an east–west direction from its point of origin and has a generally unimpeded flow, save a dam at Belvidere, Illinois. The North Branch has an average width of 50 feet (15 m), but in Boone County the stream becomes both wider and deeper. Nearer its point of origin the North Branch has a substrate of gravel, the substrate becomes sand and silt going further downstream.
