= Owens Creek (South Grand River tributary) =

Stream in the US state of Missouri

Coordinates: 38.548346°N 94.448007°W

Owens Creek is a stream in Cass County in the U.S. state of Missouri. It is a tributary of the South Grand River.

Owens Creek has the name of Elias Owen, a pioneer citizen.

== See also ==
- List of rivers of Missouri
