= Sinsinawa River =

Physical characteristics
- Source
  - location: Grant County southeast of Dickeyville, Wisconsin
  - coordinates: 42°35′54″N 90°31′46″W
  - elevation: 973 ft (297 m)
- Mouth
  - location: Confluence with the Mississippi west of Galena, Illinois
  - coordinates: 42°24′36″N 90°30′20″W
  - elevation: 591 ft (180 m)
- Length: 21 mi (34 km)
- Discharge
  - location: Menominee, Illinois
  - average: 30 cu/ft. per sec.

Basin features
- Progression: Sinsinawa River → Mississippi → Gulf of Mexico
- GNIS ID: 418548

The Sinsinawa River is a 21.1-mile-long (34.0 km) tributary of the Mississippi River. It rises in Grant County, Wisconsin, with headwaters just outside Cuba City, flowing southwards into Jo Daviess County, Illinois, joining the Mississippi a few miles west of Galena.

The river is part of the Driftless Area of Illinois and Wisconsin. This region remained ice free during the last ice age, contributing to the rugged appearance of the river canyon.

The name "Sinsinawa" is associated with Sinsinawa Mound in Grant County, Wisconsin. One version holds that "Sinsinawa" derives from an Algonquian word (possibly Potawatomi, Fox or Menominee language) for "rattlesnake" to describe the Sioux. Another version says "home of the young eagle".

== See also ==
- List of Illinois rivers
- List of Wisconsin rivers
