= Butterfield Creek =

Physical characteristics
- Source
  - location: Cook County near Matteson, Illinois
  - coordinates: 41°29′49″N 87°45′12″W
  - elevation: 713 ft (217 m)
- Mouth
  - location: Confluence with Thorn Creek, Glenwood, Illinois
  - coordinates: 41°32′46″N 87°37′26″W
  - elevation: 610 ft (190 m)
- Length: 15 mi (24 km)

Basin features
- Progression: Butterfield Creek → Thorn Creek → Little Calumet → Calumet → Lake Michigan → Great Lakes → Saint Lawrence Seaway → Gulf of Saint Lawrence
- GNIS ID: 405303

Butterfield Creek is a 15.2-mile-long (24.5 km) tributary of Thorn Creek near Chicago, Illinois, United States. Via Thorn Creek, it is part of the Calumet River watershed flowing to Lake Michigan. It is at its widest around the towns of Homewood, Chicago Heights and Glenwood. The creek starts in a small marsh in Matteson and reaches its confluence with Thorn Creek in Glenwood.

Butterfield Creek is severely degraded by a variety of pollutants including heavy metals, DDT, bacteria, and sediment which limits the stream's habitat potential. Several sewage treatment plants discharge into the stream. Riparian habitat is also severely disturbed by a combination of extreme discharges of stormwater and development. The stream has been the focus of many efforts to restore and protect water quality undertaken by a variety of governmental, non-governmental and private entities.

Butterfield Creek flows through several country club golf courses in Olympia Fields, Flossmoor, and Homewood; management of these tracts has degraded in-stream and riparian conditions necessary for wildlife movement.

The Butterfield Creek corridor continues to provide some habitat connectivity between upland headwaters and the complex of Cook County Forest Preserve District properties along Thorn Creek. The Town of Homewood has created a run/walk trail along portions of lower Butterfield Creek.
