= Mokeler Creek =

Physical characteristics
- Source
  - location: McHenry County northeast of Harvard, Illinois
  - coordinates: 42°27′22″N 88°34′11″W
  - elevation: 1,096 ft (334 m)
- Mouth
  - location: Confluence with Piscasaw Creek southwest of Harvard, Illinois
  - coordinates: 42°23′08″N 88°41′47″W
  - elevation: 846 ft (258 m)
- Length: 10 mi (16 km)

Basin features
- Progression: Mokeler Creek → Piscasaw → Kishwaukee → Rock → Mississippi → Gulf of Mexico
- GNIS ID: 413707

Mokeler Creek is a 10.1-mile-long (16.3 km) tributary of Piscasaw Creek, itself a tributary of the Kishwaukee River, in northern Illinois.

== Course ==
Mokeler Creek originates in farm fields between Crowley Road and Oak Grove Road, about 2.5 miles (4.0 km) northeast of Harvard, Illinois. It then flows directly through the city of Harvard. The creek is a tributary of Piscasaw Creek and flows southwest until it empties into the Piscasaw about 4.4 miles (7.1 km) southwest of Harvard.

== Description ==
Mokeler Creek is 10 stream miles in length. In 1996 the Illinois Environmental Protection Agency assessed the stream for overall resource quality. It was found to have "fair" conditions, with the main contamination problems coming from agricultural run-off and construction. Additionally, the City of Harvard's wastewater treatment plant discharges effluent into Mokeler creek as it flows through the city.
