= Wood River (Illinois) =

Physical characteristics
- Source
  - location: Confluence of the West and East Forks 2.4 mi (3.9 km) above the mouth
  - coordinates: 38°53′26″N 90°06′54″W
- Mouth
  - location: Confluence with the Mississippi River near East Alton
  - coordinates: 38°51′38″N 90°07′44″W
  - elevation: 404 ft (123 m)
- Length: 2.4 mi (3.9 km)

Basin features
- GNIS ID: 421411

East Fork Wood River

Physical characteristics
- Source
  - location: Macoupin County north of Bunker Hill
  - coordinates: 39°04′48″N 89°57′04″W
- Mouth
  - location: Confluence with the West Fork, forming Wood River
  - coordinates: 38°53′26″N 90°06′54″W
  - elevation: 420 ft (130 m)

Basin features
- GNIS ID: 407649

West Fork Wood River

Physical characteristics
- Source
  - location: Macoupin County east of Brighton
  - coordinates: 39°02′54″N 90°06′58″W
- Mouth
  - location: Confluence with the East Fork forming the Wood River
  - coordinates: 38°53′26″N 90°06′54″W
  - elevation: 420 ft (130 m)
- Length: 16.4 mi (26.4 km)

Basin features
- GNIS ID: 420841

Wood River (historically, Rivière du Bois) is a 2.4-mile-long (3.9 km) tributary of the Mississippi River, which it joins near East Alton, and Wood River, Illinois, to the northeast of St. Louis, Missouri.

The Wood River is formed by the confluence of its West and East forks. These come together near where they drop down from the Mississippi bluffs. The natural channel of the Wood River used to follow the Mississippi through the bottoms before joining it. This has been cut off by an artificial channel that runs through flood control structures directly to the Mississippi. In 1803, the Wood River (then known in French as 'du Bois), gave its name to Camp Wood, where the Lewis and Clark expedition assembled.

The West Fork of the Wood River is 16.4 miles (26.4 km) long, and the East Fork is 21.9 miles (35.2 km) long. Honeycut Branch is a major tributary of the West Fork, and Girder Branch is a major tributary of the East Fork.

The mouth of the Wood River was a highly industrialized area during much of the 20th century. The Olin Chemical plant produced explosives and munitions for the wars of the last century. This remains as the Winchester ammunition plant. The Wood River petroleum refinery continues to operate on a reduced scale.

== Cities, towns and counties ==
The following cities, towns and villages are in the Wood River watershed:

- Alton
- Bethalto
- East Alton
- Wood River
- Woodburn

The following Illinois counties are drained in part by the Wood River:

- Jersey County
- Macoupin County
- Madison County

== See also ==
- List of Illinois rivers
