= Rush Creek (Kishwaukee River tributary) =

Physical characteristics
- Source
  - location: McHenry County southeast of Harvard, Illinois
  - coordinates: 42°23′18″N 88°34′07″W
  - elevation: 1,015 ft (309 m)
- Mouth
  - location: Confluence with the Kishwaukee east of Belvidere, Illinois
  - coordinates: 42°15′23″N 88°42′10″W
  - elevation: 774 ft (236 m)
- Length: 15 mi (24 km)

Basin features
- Progression: Rush Creek → Kishwaukee → Rock → Mississippi → Gulf of Mexico
- GNIS ID: 417053

Rush Creek is a 14.9-mile-long (24.0 km) tributary of the Kishwaukee River in northern Illinois.

There is another Rush Creek that is a tributary of the Mississippi River in Carroll County.

== Course ==
Rush Creek's origin is in a complex of wetlands near Harvard, Illinois, two miles southeast. The stream then flows southwest until it empties into the main stem of the Kishwaukee River one mile east of Garden Prairie.

== Description ==
Approximately 65% of the main stem of Rush Creek has been channelized (ditched and straighten), however 50% of those areas are showing signs of recovery. Despite the channelization and encroachment from agriculture many of the stream's features such as riffles can still be seen.

== Wildlife ==
Twenty-nine species of fish have been identified within Rush Creek and its tributaries, two of those species have not been seen in the watershed since 1965 - the northern pike and the largescale stoneroller. Three animal species are on state or federal endangered or threatened lists - river otter, and two mussels, Elliptio dilatata (Spike) and Alasmidonta viridis (Slippershell).
