= Owens Creek (Kishwaukee River tributary) =

Physical characteristics
- Source
  - location: DeKalb County west of DeKalb, Illinois
  - coordinates: 41°56′48″N 88°50′19″W
  - elevation: 889 ft (271 m)
- Mouth
  - location: Confluence with the South Branch Kishwaukee River south of Rockford, Illinois
  - coordinates: 42°06′05″N 88°53′06″W
  - elevation: 748 ft (228 m)
- Length: 15 mi (24 km)

Basin features
- Progression: Owens Creek → South Branch Kishwaukee → Kishwaukee → Rock → Mississippi → Gulf of Mexico
- GNIS ID: 421991

Owens Creek is a 15.0-mile-long (24.1 km) stream in the Kishwaukee River watershed in northern Illinois. It is a tributary of the South Branch Kishwaukee River.

== Course ==
Owens Creek originates along Illinois Route 38 near Malta, Illinois, although the stream channel does not begin until it reaches Rich Road in northwest DeKalb Township. Owens Creek enters the South Branch Kishwaukee River in northwestern DeKalb County just downstream from Irene Road.

== Description ==
Owens Creek is located in rural DeKalb County, an area heavily dominated by agriculture. The creek has been heavily modified by the surrounding agricultural activity. There are several stretches of the stream, however, that are considered to be in good condition. A stretch north of Illinois Route 72, before the stream's confluence with the South Branch Kishwaukee River is in "very good condition". Additionally there are several short stretches between Route 72 and Old State Road, some 4 miles (6.4 km) upstream, that are in good condition as well.

Henry Lamson Boies recorded a description of Owens Creek in his 1868 History of DeKalb County:

A pleasant little stream of water, called Owen's Creek, following a meandering course, passes nearly through its whole length, rising in the southeast portion, and flowing towards the northwest, where, in the adjoining town of Franklin, it empties into the Kishwaukee river, In its course the stream widens several times, forming miniature lakes, which, in the warm season of the year, with their wide borderings of deep green, the many flocks of water-fowl, hovering high above them, or settling down into the clear waters where the pickerel and a variety of smaller fry abound, form pictures, not only very attractive to the lover of nature, but to the eye of the sportsman and anglers.

== Wildlife ==
Owens Creek is an active fishery but very little data has been accumulated on what species of fish live in the stream network. The latest data dates to 1970 and 1961. At that time smallmouth bass and rock bass were among the species recorded in the creek.

== See also ==
- List of rivers of Illinois
