= Kishwaukee River =

River in Illinois, United States

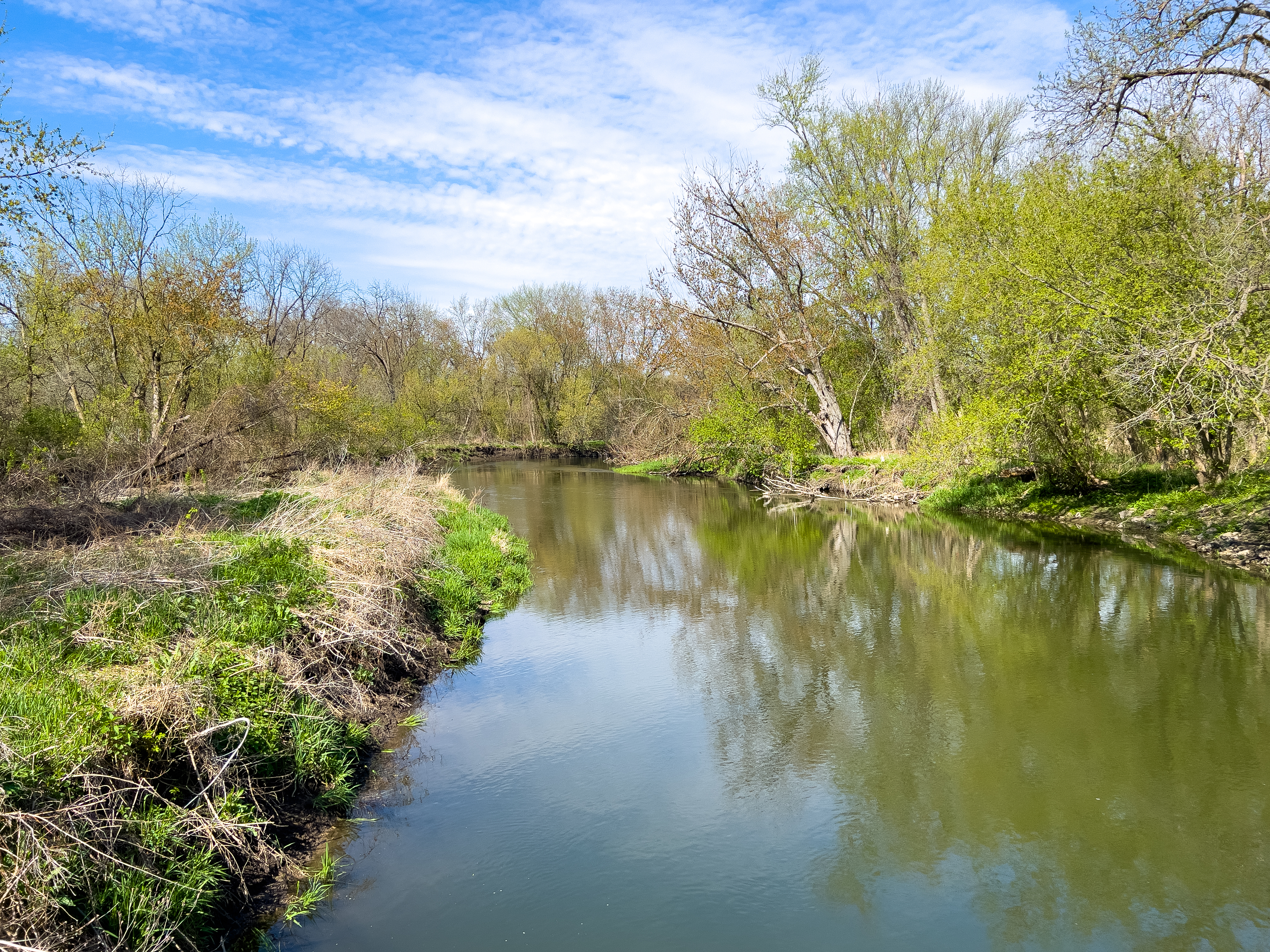
- Kishwaukee River at Kishwaukee River State Fish and Wildlife Area, spring 2025

Location
- Country: United States

Physical characteristics
- Source
  - location: Cropsey Moraine, south of Woodstock, Illinois
  - coordinates: 42°17′45″N 88°26′52″W
- Mouth
  - location: Rock River west of New Milford, Illinois
  - coordinates: 42°11′10″N 89°07′52″W
  - elevation: 682 ft (208 m)
- Length: 63.4 mi (102.0 km)
- Basin size: 1257 sq mi
- Discharge
  - location: mouth
  - average: 1,076.77 cu ft/s (30.491 m^{3}/s) (estimate)

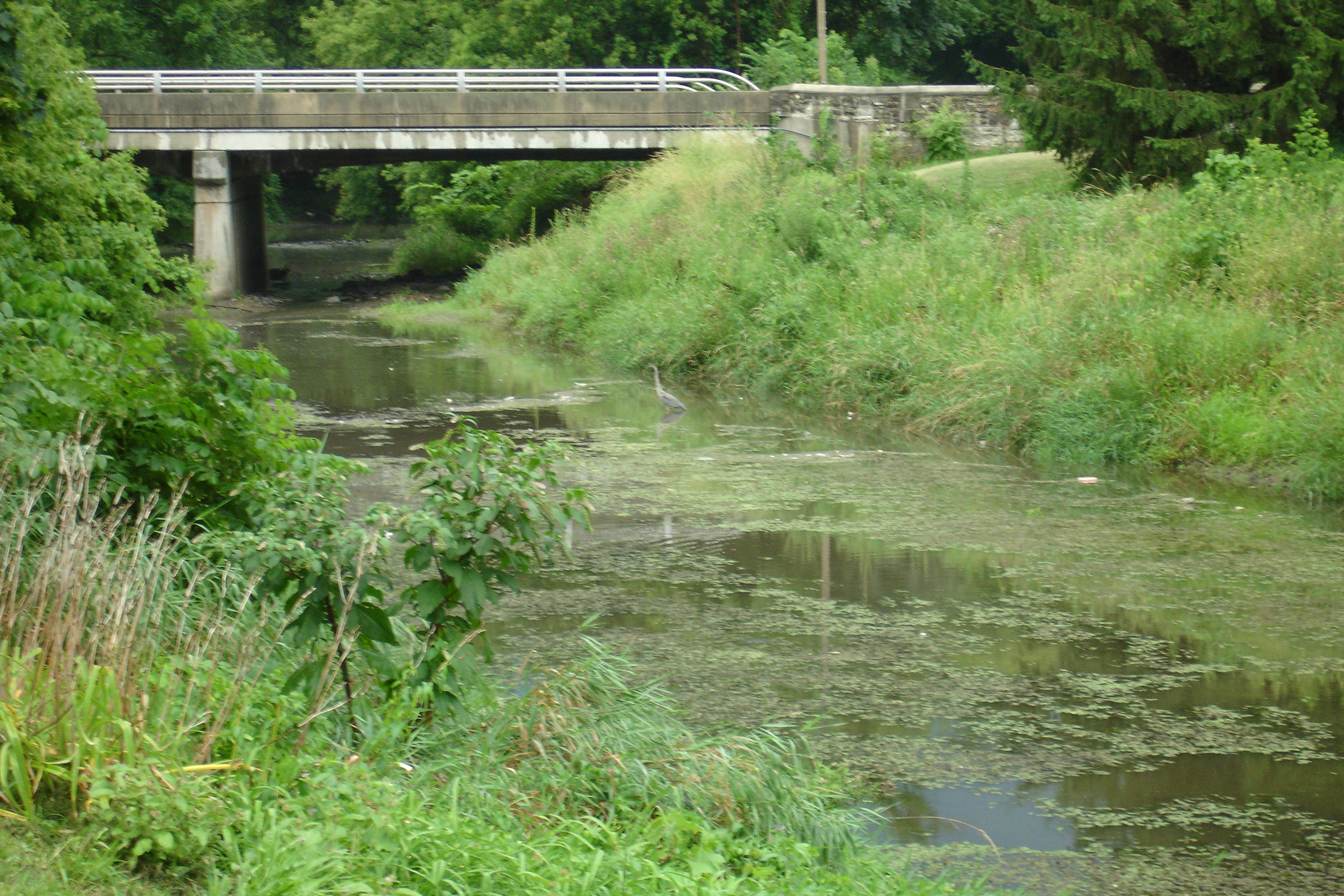
A great blue heron wades on the South Branch Kishwaukee River in DeKalb, Illinois, September 2006.

The Kishwaukee River, locally known as simply The Kish, is a 63.4-mile-long (102.0 km) river in the U.S. state of Illinois. It is a tributary of the Rock River and its name derives from the Potawatomi word for "river of the sycamore".

== Location ==
The Kishwaukee River flows from Woodstock to Rockford, Illinois, where it is a tributary to the Rock River. The river begins near the intersection of Route 47 and Route 14 in Woodstock. It meanders across northern Illinois to the Rock River. This part of the river is known as the North Branch or the Main Branch. This stretch of stream has an average width of 50 feet (15 m) but it becomes wider and deeper near the Boone County line.

The South Branch of the Kishwaukee River originates near Shabbona on the Cropsey Moraine. The river flows north to Genoa, where it turns westward and flows north-northwest and joins the North Branch near Cherry Valley. The South Branch's average width is 55 feet (17 m).

The Kishwaukee River drainage area includes McHenry, Boone, Kane, DeKalb, Ogle, and Winnebago Counties. Crop lands occupy two-thirds of the watershed's surface area.

== History ==
The Kishwaukee has been used by humans for thousands of years. Native Americans first used it to transport goods for trade and travel between villages, and also drew water from it for domestic uses. The name Kishwaukee is derived from the Potawatomi word meaning the "river of the sycamore." The Potawatomi harvested larger sycamore trees in the river valley to make dugout canoes. The river demarcates the part of the northernmost natural range of the sycamore tree.

Native Americans began to arrive in the area in the closing years of the last ice age. Near the mouth of the Kishwaukee, not too far from the Rock River valley, are several earthwork mound sites that were built during the Mississippian period, around 900 CE, or the Upper Mississippian period around 1400 CE. No archaeological sites have been identified from the historic Native American period, which is generally said to begin around 1650. Several historic Native American tribes are known to have occupied this area during that time. In addition to the Potawatomi, the Mascouten were in the Kishwaukee region at the time of the first contact with Europeans, around 1655. French explorers and missionaries recorded encounters with them.

== Waste spills and fish kills ==
The life of the river and its overall ecology have been affected by industrial development and the increase in the number of large hog farms in the region. The hog farms generate extensive waste that poses a threat to the river.

On Wednesday, April 20, 1988, the employees of Lincoln Land Hog Farm, north of Sycamore, were working on a pipe on the farm's retention pond. The berm wall gave way, allowing two million gallons of hog waste to spill into the Kishwaukee River. This resulted in aquatic life downstream being utterly destroyed. The Illinois Department of Natural Resources (IDNR) stated that 37.2 miles (59.9 km) of the river were affected: an estimated 70,000 fish were killed along with aquatic plants, insects, clams and crustaceans.

The city of DeKalb has been the location of more than half of the fish kills on the Kishwaukee River since 1954. Of the 19 documented fish kills since that year, 11 of them have occurred within DeKalb city limits.

Another well-documented fish kill along the Kishwaukee was in 1984. According to IDOC reports, the 1984 fish kill and a number of others were correlated to heavy canning activities at the Del Monte canning facility that once operated on Taylor Street in DeKalb. The 1984 fish kill affected a portion of the river from a bend north of Lucinda Avenue, near Annie's Woods, to Lincoln Highway. IDOC gathered evidence that proved a faulty pipe at Del Monte was responsible for this particular fish kill. After finding they were at fault, Del Monte paid the state an agreed upon value of lost fish and took steps to prevent a similar mishap.

== Hydrologic history ==
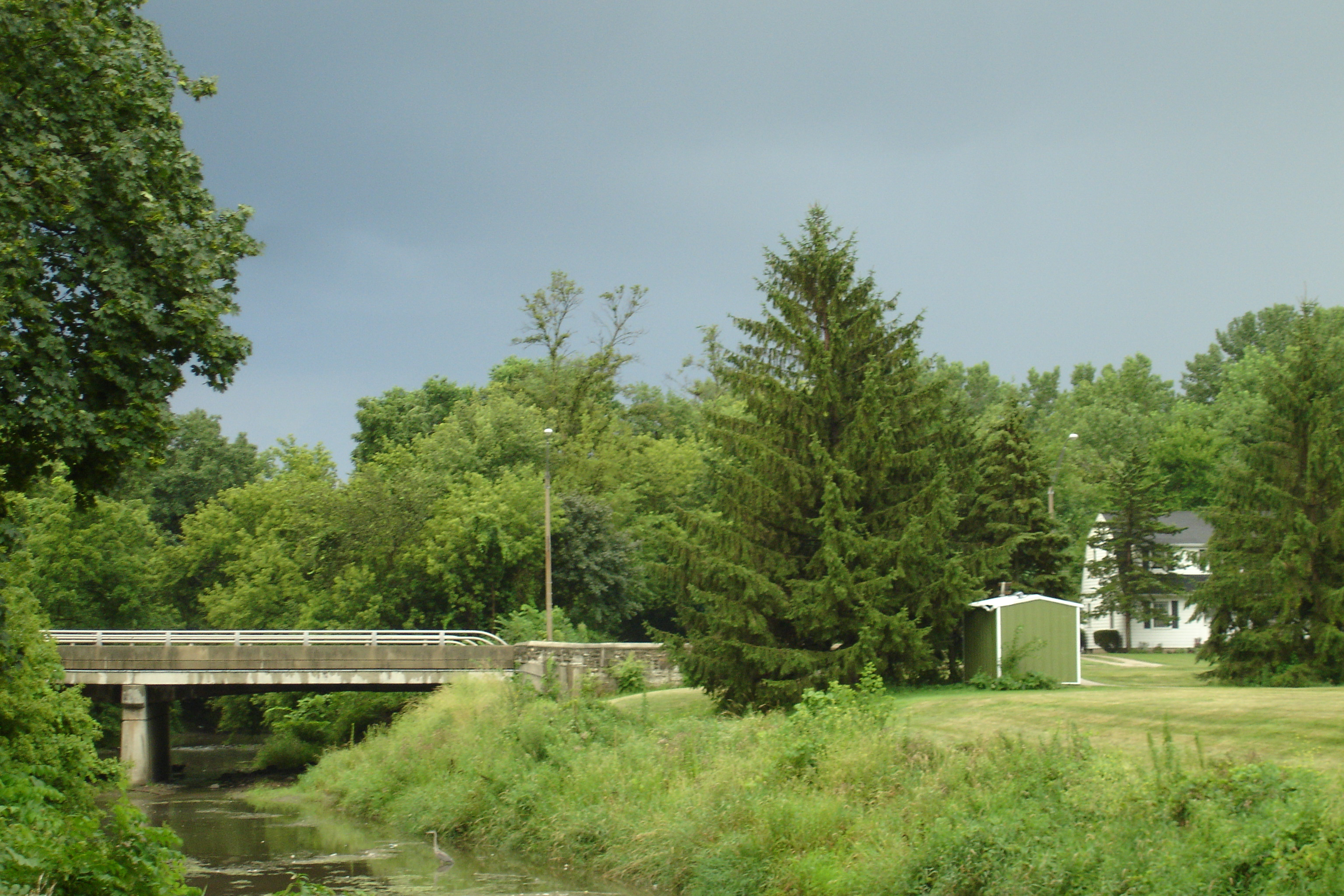
A mid-September thunderstorm rolls into DeKalb over the Kishwaukee River.

The United States Geological Survey maintains four monitoring stations, in cooperation with National Weather Service, along the Kishwaukee River. It has extensive data on low records and high crests and other information that is hydrologically pertinent. The four stations are in DeKalb, Fairdale, Belvidere and Perryville Road in Rockford. The DeKalb and Fairdale stations are along the South Branch Kishwaukee, while the other two are both along the main branch.

Flood stages vary slightly at each of the monitoring stations. At DeKalb flood stage is 10 feet (3 m) with moderate flood stage at 11 and major set at 12.5 feet (3.8 m). In Belvidere major flood stage is at 12 feet (4 m), while moderate is at 10 and flood stage is at nine feet. In Perryville, near the mouth of the Kishwaukee, flood stage is 12 feet (4 m), moderate flood stage is 18, and major flood stage is 22 feet (7 m).

=== Historical crests ===
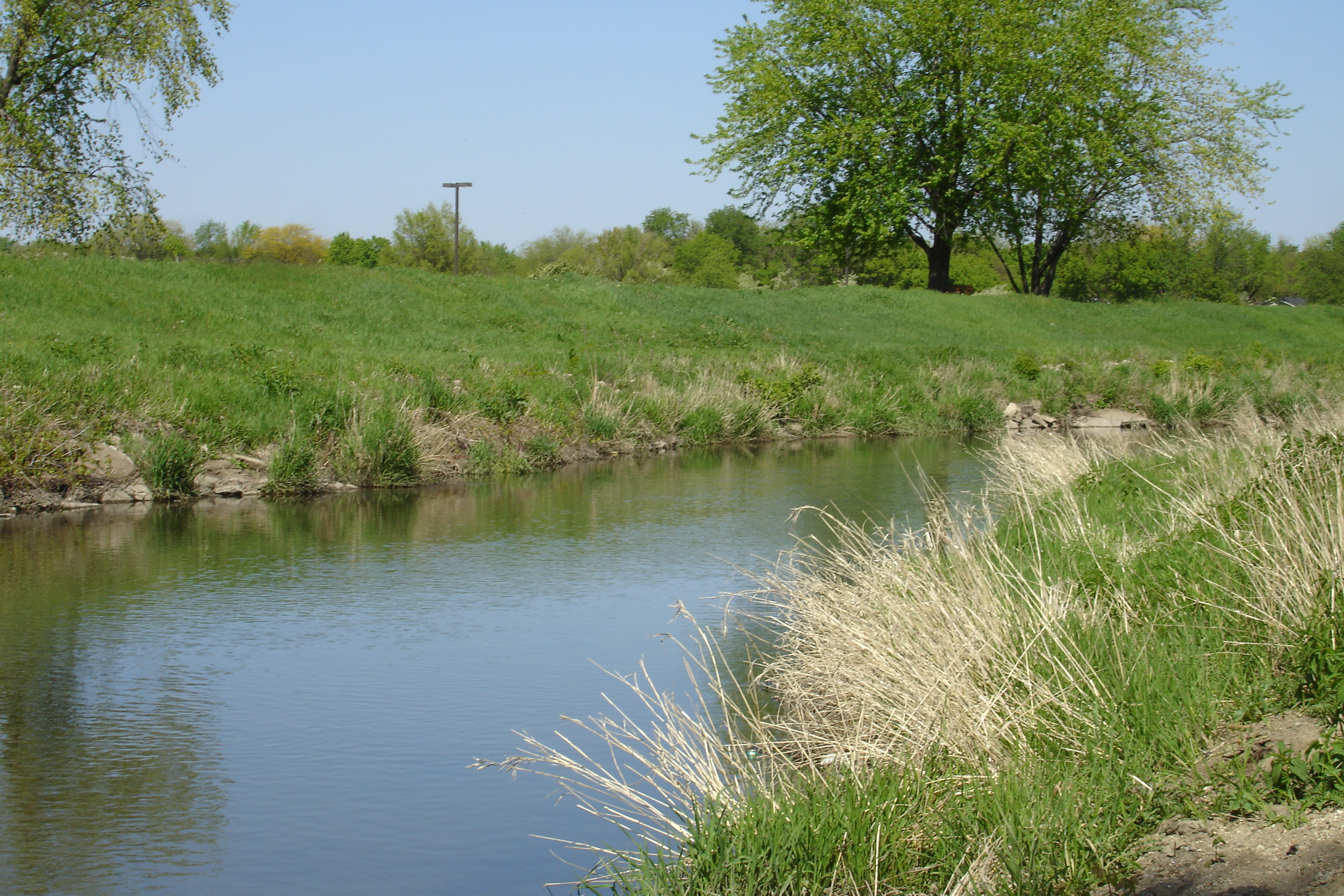
The Kishwaukee River meanders by Annie's Woods in DeKalb in spring 2006.

As of July 2010.

Belvidere

- February 20, 1994: 14.19 feet (4.33 m)
- June 14, 1999: 13.97 feet (4.26 m)
- March 16, 1943: 13.1 feet (4.0 m)
- January 6, 1946: 12.9 feet (4 m)
- July 3, 1978: 12.88 feet (3.93 m)

DeKalb

- July 2, 1983: 15.80 feet (4.8 m)
- August 24, 2007: 15.34 feet (4.68 m)
- July 18, 1996: 12.97 feet (3.95 m)
- February 21, 1997: 12.64 feet (3.85 m)
- June 12, 1929: 12.33 feet (3.76 m)

Perryville

- July 18, 1996: 23.54 feet (7.17 m)
- February 21, 1994: 20.71 feet (6.31 m)
- March 21, 1979: 20.48 feet (6.24 m)
- February 22, 1997: 19.76 feet (6.02 m)
- April 22, 1973: 19.65 feet (5.99 m)

=== 2007 flood ===
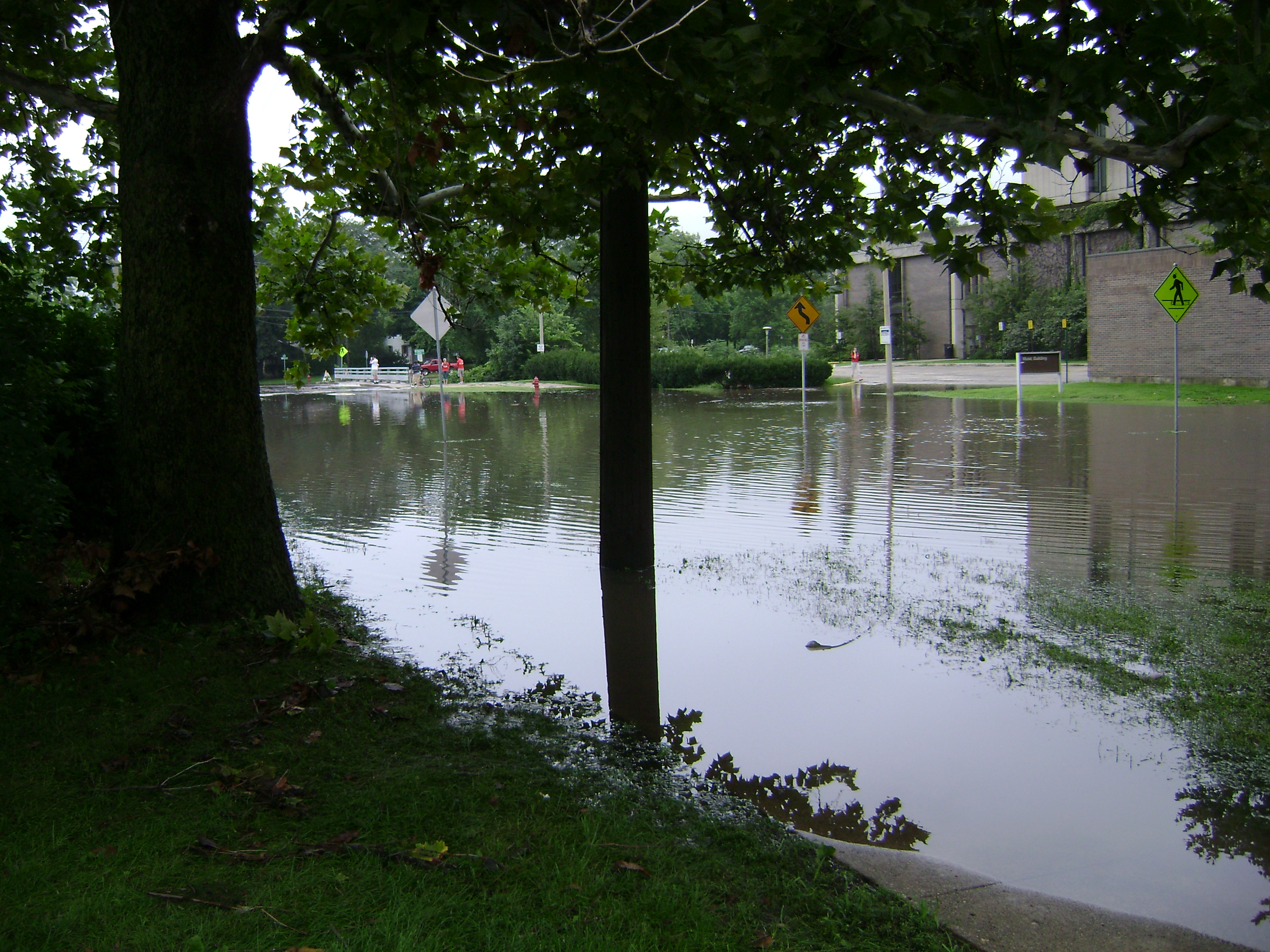
The Kishwaukee River, fully crested at 15.2 feet, over Lucinda Avenue In DeKalb August 24th, 2007

On August 24, 2007, the Kishwaukee River at DeKalb, Illinois crested at 15.27 feet (all-time record 15.8 ft) causing major flooding. This was only the second time the river rose above 15 feet (5 m) since the level of the river has been recorded.

=== Geologic ===
Much of the region around the Kishwaukee was shaped by glaciation. Early residents of DeKalb County noticed surface boulders dotting the area. Rounded and granite, these boulders ranged in size from a cannonball to giant rocks weighing more than a ton. These boulders were dubbed "hard heads" by the locals. They were used in the underpinning of barns and for the stoning of wells. The glaciation had produced and moved the boulders. Two major ice sheets advanced over the Kishwaukee basin in its past. The first, the Illinoian covered the area 300,000 to 125,000 years ago. Though the Illinoian covered the entire area, evidence of the coverage is found only in a few sediments at the surface in select sites. The second ice sheet, the Wisconsinan, advanced over the area 25,000 to 13,500 years ago and covered most of the prior glacial deposits.

The end moraines mark where the glacial margin once stood. One of the more visible of these formations is the Marengo Moraine, which is a north–south moraine in western McHenry County; it extends southwest across northwestern Kane County. The ridge is named after the town of Marengo, located on the moraine. North of the Marengo Moraine and to the west of the North Branch Kishwaukee River is a deep depression, or notch, across the Marengo Moraine. The depression is a subglacial channel, easily differentiated from a valley by the lack of rivers and streams along its bottom. The channel once carried meltwater from under and in front of the glacier when it was depositing its moraine.

== Tributaries ==
Major tributaries of the Kishwaukee River include Piscasaw Creek, Rush Creek, Beaver Creek, Killbuck Creek, the North Branch Kishwaukee River and two separate tributaries called South Branch Kishwaukee River. Other tributaries include Mokeler Creek, Bessie Creek, Lawrence Creek, Owens Creek and Coon Creek.

== Wildlife ==
As a "Class A" stream fish in the Kishwaukee thrive in a sediment free environment. Class A is denoted by the Illinois Department of Natural Resources (IDNR), the IDNR samples fish populations and measures pollution at stream sites throughout the state. A designation of Class A describes a stream where a significant number of the species of fish are silt intolerant. The Kishwaukee River watershed is home to 28 endangered, threatened, or watch-listed species.

=== Plants ===
Plant life along the Kishwaukee is abundant. Various native flora from burr oaks, and lady's slippers to lousewort, and trilliums to trout lilies. Skunk cabbage blooms in late February and at the other end of the spectrum goldenrods and gentians bloom in late October, 1,070 species of plant are found in the Kishwaukee Basin, around 34% of the state's native vascular plants. Of that number 14 are listed as endangered in Illinois and another 14 as threatened in the state as of 1997. In addition the prairie bush clover is a federally threatened species that occurs in the basin.

Invasive species continue to be a problem in the Kishwaukee River Basin. 21% of the area's plants are foreign species. Canada thistle has persisted in the region since as early as 1922 when McHenry County started showing concern. "The county has its regular thistle commissioners and they in turn have been authorized to engage scores of assistants to aid in doing away with these pests ... If the land owner refuses to cut them down at the lawful time, the commissioner simply hires a man [at $3 to $4 a day] to do the work and reports the transaction and makes a bill which is placed against the land at the coming tax paying season", McHenry County officials were recorded as saying at the time.

The vegetation that dots the Kishwaukee Basin today is but a fraction of what it once was. In 1820, before European colonization, around 74% of the riparian area was forested, and the remainder was prairie. The forests were varied. Savanna, blacksoil and gravel prairies were included in the 74%, as well as various wetlands. Toward the southwest the land became flatter and dominated by prairie thanks to few natural barriers for wildfires. By 1997 those numbers had dwindled. McHenry County still had the highest percentage of wetlands, at 6.2% and DeKalb County still had the least at 1.0%

=== Mammals ===
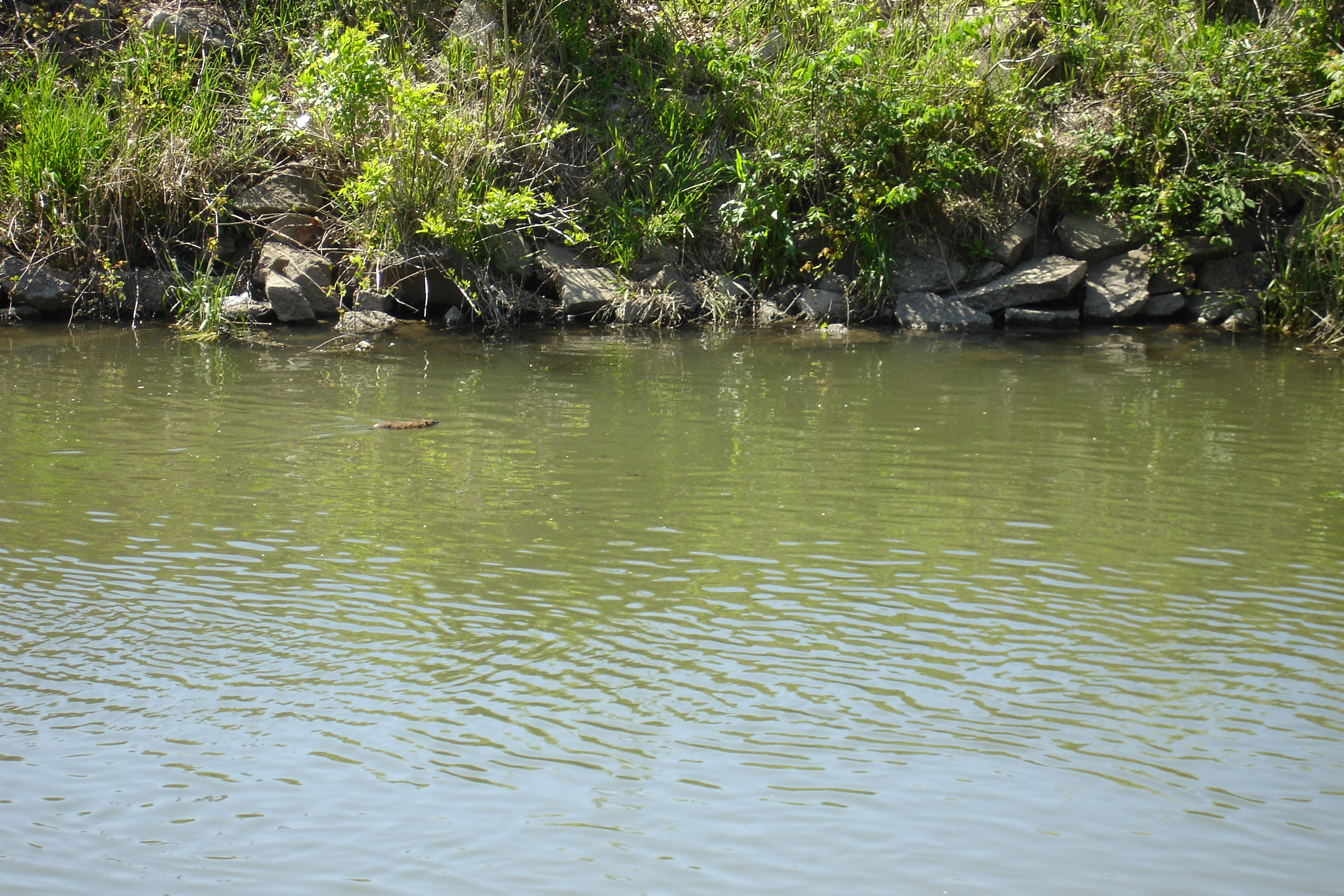
A muskrat moves through the waters of the Kishwaukee River. Muskrat are one of many mammals to be found in and around the river.

Rabbit, woodchuck and skunk are all common along the river. The once common martin no longer occur in the area and the prairie wolf is less common. White-tailed deer are numerous as they are over much of the state of Illinois. One of the smallest and fiercest mammals in Illinois is the shrew. Shrew will not hesitate to go after prey twice its size and four of the state's six shrew species can be found around the Kishwaukee River. Though none of the shrew species are endangered the tiny pygmy shrew has been called the "rarest shrew in Illinois." They have been collected along the Kishwaukee and their abundance suggests they may be more common than previously assumed.

==== River otters ====
Before 1987 the IDNR's records show no signs of river otter in the Kishwaukee River. The reason was that the Kishwaukee and its tributaries wandered through prairies with little or no tree cover. It was only once the prairies were farmed that trees began to thrive along the shores of the river, creating ideal habitat for river otters. Today the Kishwaukee provides habitat suitable for river otters.

By 1997 the river otter had been sighted along the South Branch Kishwaukee River. In addition to tree cover river otters find ideal habitat in northern Illinois when it is isolated from the main river channel, has extensive vegetation, open water in winter, good water quality, suitable den sites and minimal human disturbance.

=== Amphibians and reptiles ===
Twelve amphibian and 21 reptile species can be found along the river. This represents 30% of the amphibians and 34% of reptiles found in Illinois. Although there are not currently any endangered or threatened reptile or amphibian species the river basin was at one time home to the state-endangered eastern massasauga.

=== Birds ===
The Kishwaukee's bird population is not atypical for the area, which is primarily agricultural. Of the 299 species of bird that regularly occur in Illinois at least 262 of them can be found along and around the Kishwaukee River. Around 135 species have bred in and around the Kishwaukee River at some time or another. The wetlands that remain along the Kishwaukee are some of the most desirable habitat for avian species. Exner Marsh and Kloemphen Marsh, both in McHenry County, have great blue heron, pied-billed grebe, king rail, common gallinule, veery the state-endangered yellow-headed blackbird, the state-endangered osprey, and the state-threatened least bittern. Several bald eagles hunt and nest in the Rockford area.

== Parks and conservation ==
=== Boone County ===
In Boone County the Boone County Conservation District maintains Kishwaukee Bottoms. The Bottoms encompass several individual conservation areas. Anderson Bend, Distillery and LIB are all three located along the Kishwaukee River west of Belvidere. The LIB entrance is located 2.5 miles (4.0 km) west of Belvidere.

The areas that are part of Kishwaukee Bottoms lie along the banks of the river and thus host typical flora and fauna of northern Illinois river bottom. Silver maple, sycamore and willow trees populate the shores of the river. These species dominate because of adaptations which allow them to withstand seasonal flooding. Lower areas in the Bottoms are sprinkled with wetlands that are populated by myriad aquatic species including turtles, frogs and beaver. Water fowl and wading birds are common throughout the marsh as well as along much of the Kishwaukee River itself.

In all Kishwaukee Bottoms contains 547 acres (2.2 km^{2}) of wild land which contains little development. Hiking and skiing trails total about 7.6 miles (12.2 km) and wind through prairies, woodlands, and wetlands.

=== DeKalb County ===
The DeKalb County Forest Preserve District operates a number of forest preserves along the Kishwaukee River. MacQueen Forest Preserve and 300-acre (1.2 km^{2}) Potawatomi Forest Preserve are adjacent and straddle the north side of the bank of South Branch while just across the stream, on the banks' south side, is the nearly 600-acre (2.4 km^{2}) preserve set aside by the state. In all, the area of MacQueen and Potawatomi preserves encompasses more than 900 acres (3.6 km^{2}) and 3.2 miles (5.1 km) of the Kishwaukee River, which is not only set aside for public use but actively being conserved and monitored.

==== Kishwaukee River State Fish and Wildlife Area ====
Under Governor George Ryan the state of Illinois acquired 570 acres (2.3 km^{2}) of land along the Kishwaukee River in DeKalb County. The land was purchased using $2.68 million in Illinois Open Land Trust funding. The area was opened to the public as the Kishwaukee River State Fish and Wildlife Area.

=== Winnebago County ===
The Winnebago County Forest Preserve District operates and maintains Kishwaukee River Forest Preserve. This 145-acre (0.6 km^{2}) preserve was acquired by the district in 1927. Included in the preserve is canoe access, 1.5 miles (2.4 km) of hiking trails, fishing access and a 30-acre (120,000 m^{2}) oak woods site. The oak woods is an Illinois Natural Area Inventory site of notable natural quality, and trails provide public access. The Winnebago County Forest Preserve District also owns and operates Oak Ridge Forest Preserve, Deer Run Forest Preserve, Espenscheid Memorial Forest Preserve, McKiski Forest Preserve, Blackhawk Springs Forest Preserve, Kishwaukee Gorge North Forest Preserve, Kishwaukee Gorge South Forest Preserve, Rockford Rotary Forest Preserve, Kilbuck Bluffs Forest Preserve, and Hinchliff Forest Preserve.

The Rockford Park District owns and operates the 334-acre (1.4 km^{2}) Seth B. Atwood Park, the former rifle range of Camp Grant.

The Village of Cherry Valley owns and operates the 96-acre (0.4 km^{2}) Baumann Park.

== Environmental preservation ==
The Kishwaukee River Ecosystem Partnership, founded in 1996, is an organization whose purpose is the continued preservation of the river's natural resources.

Friends of the Kishwaukee River, founded in 2012, is a non-profit organization whose mission is to promote and enhance good stewardship of the river and the surrounding lands by restoring and preserving its natural character, encouraging safe and responsible recreation, protecting its watershed from degradation, and increasing the area's community's appreciation of its natural beauty.

== See also ==
- Intensive pig farming
- List of Illinois rivers
