= Menominee River (Illinois) =

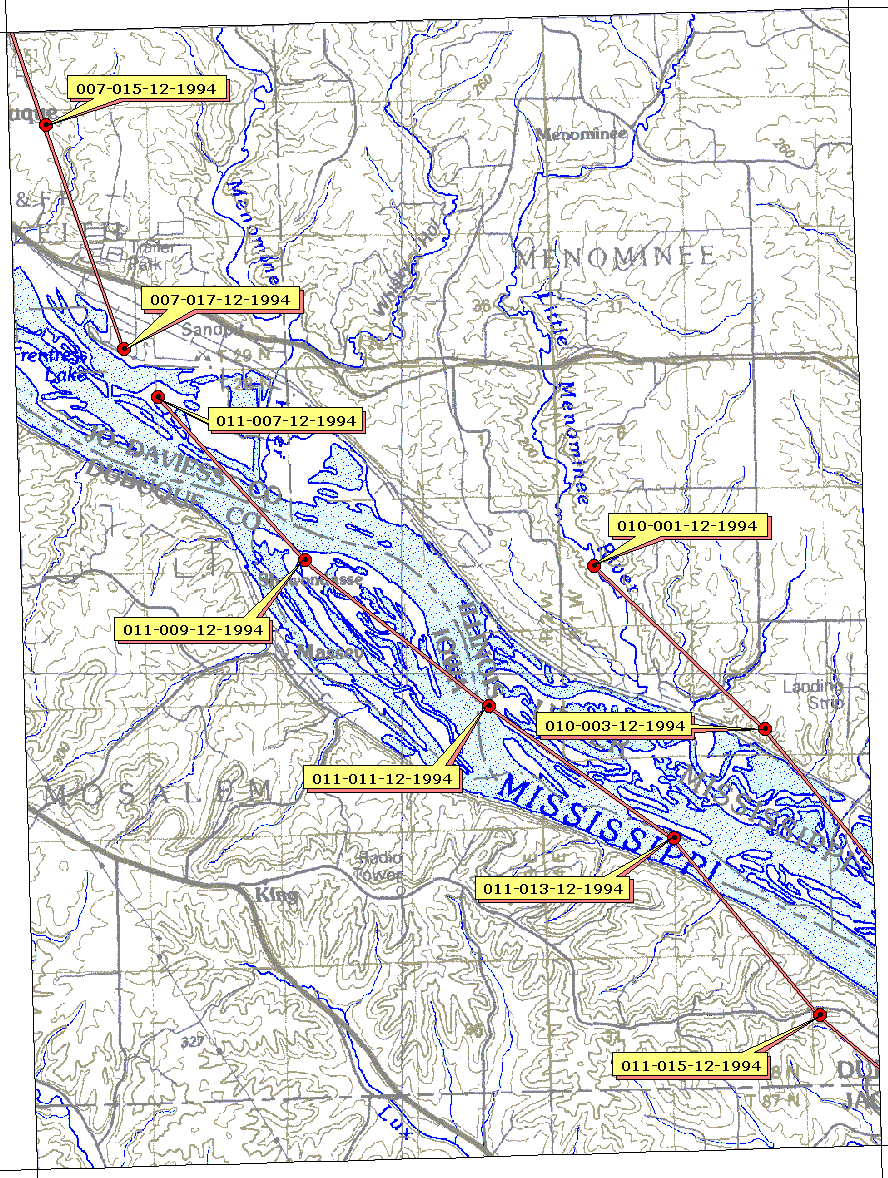
- Menominee River (USGS)

Physical characteristics
- Source
  - location: Grant County, Wisconsin
  - coordinates: 42°33′44″N 90°36′09″W
  - elevation: 796 ft (243 m)
- Mouth
  - location: Confluence with the Mississippi, Jo Daviess County, Illinois
  - coordinates: 42°27′04″N 90°35′24″W
  - elevation: 597 ft (182 m)
- Length: 14 mi (23 km)

Basin features
- Progression: Menominee River → Mississippi → Gulf of Mexico
- GNIS ID: 413409

The Menominee River is an 11.3-mile-long (18.2 km) tributary of the Mississippi River, which it joins in Jo Daviess County, Illinois.

The name "Menominee" refers to the Menominee, a Native American people. The name means "good seed" or "wild rice".

The Menominee rises in Grant County, Wisconsin at the confluence of Louisburg and Kieler creeks one mile south of Kieler just east of U.S. Route 151 and flows south past Sandy Hook and enters Illinois just south of Wisconsin Highway 11. It continues south through the northwestern corner of Illinois for about four miles before reaching its confluence with the Mississippi River after crossing under U.S. Route 20.

The river is part of the Driftless Area of Illinois and Wisconsin, a region that remained ice-free during the last ice age.

== See also ==
- List of Illinois rivers
- List of Wisconsin rivers
