= Addison Creek (Salt Creek tributary) =

Location
- Country: United States
- State: Illinois

Physical characteristics
- Source
  - location: Bensenville, DuPage County
  - coordinates: 41°56′54″N 87°55′51″W
- Mouth: Salt Creek
  - location: North Riverside, Cook County
  - coordinates: 41°50′46″N 87°51′12″W
  - elevation: 614 ft (187 m)
- Length: 10.7 mi (17.2 km)

Basin features
- GNIS ID: 421693

Addison Creek is a 10.7-mile-long (17.2 km) stream in the northeastern portion of the U.S. state of Illinois. It is a tributary of Salt Creek. Addison Creek originates in Bensenville and runs south and east through Northlake, Stone Park, Maywood, Bellwood, and Westchester. Water from the creek flows via Salt Creek, the Des Plaines River, and the Illinois River to the Mississippi River and ultimately the Gulf of Mexico.
