= Coon Creek (Kishwaukee River tributary) =

River in Illinois, U.S.

Physical characteristics
- Source
  - location: Burlington Township, Kane County, Illinois
  - coordinates: 42°01′09″N 88°34′59″W
  - elevation: 880 ft (270 m)
- Mouth
  - location: Confluence with the Kishwaukee River east of Belvidere, Illinois
  - coordinates: 42°15′16″N 88°47′39″W
  - elevation: 758 ft (231 m)
- Length: 28 mi (45 km)

Basin features
- Progression: Coon Creek → Kishwaukee → Rock → Mississippi → Gulf of Mexico
- GNIS ID: 421756

Coon Creek is a 28.1-mile-long (45.2 km) tributary of the Kishwaukee River in northern Illinois.

== Course ==
Coon Creek flows north from DeKalb County, Illinois, into McHenry County. The stream continues flowing northwest from the DeKalb County–McHenry County line until it empties into the Kishwaukee River in Boone County. In terms of square miles drained, Coon Creek is the second-largest tributary of the Kishwaukee River, behind only the South Branch Kishwaukee River.

== Description ==
The DeKalb County and Boone–McHenry County portions of Coon Creek are different in character. While 72% of the watershed, Coon Creek and its tributaries, has had its stream beds channelized (ditched and straightened) only 42% of the Coon's main stem has been channelized. In McHenry County, Coon Creek still features many of its natural features, such as pools and riffles. In DeKalb County, further away from the Kishwaukee, the stream has been entirely channelized, only 6% of the Coon's tributaries in this area have not been channelized. This portion of Coon Creek retains very few of the natural instream characteristics such as pools or riffles.

== Wildlife ==
The Coon Creek watershed (technically a subwatershed) is home to at least 34 different species of fish. Some of the species found in Coon Creek include bluegill, black crappie, smallmouth bass, largemouth bass and northern pike. The blacknose shiner (Notropis heteropis) is an example of an endangered fish found in the creek. The creek is also home to two species of reptile, the federally threatened Blanding's turtle (Emydoidea blandingii) and the snapping turtle.

== Tributaries ==
Coon Creek has several tributaries. Among them are Harmony Creek, Hampshire Creek, and Burlington Creek.
