= Embarras River (Illinois) =

River in Illinois, United States

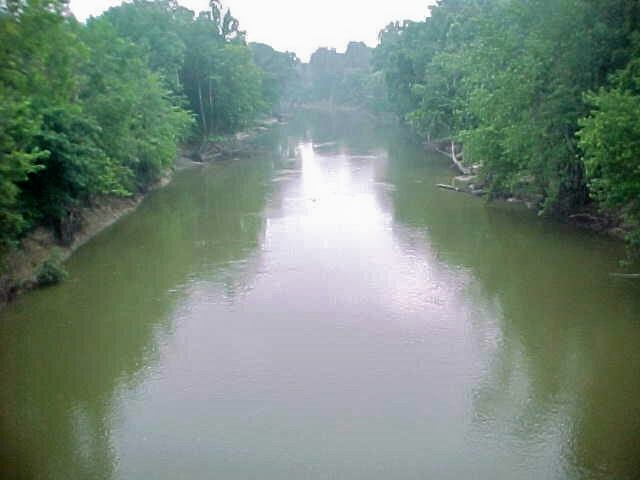
- The Embarras River at Lawrenceville

Physical characteristics
- Source
  - location: Champaign, Illinois
  - coordinates: 40°05′40″N 88°15′02″W
- Mouth
  - location: Confluence with the Wabash River southeast of Lawrenceville, Illinois
  - coordinates: 38°38′35″N 87°37′02″W
  - elevation: 397 ft (121 m)
- Length: 195 mi (314 km)
- Discharge
  - location: Lawrenceville, Illinois
  - average: 2,648 cu/ft. per sec.

Basin features
- Progression: Embarras River → Wabash → Ohio → Mississippi → Gulf of Mexico
- GNIS ID: 407983

The Embarras River (/ˈɛmbrɑː/ EM-brah) is a 195-mile-long (314 km) tributary of the Wabash River in southeastern Illinois in the United States. The waters of the Embarras reach the Gulf of Mexico via the Wabash, Ohio, and Mississippi rivers. The river drains a watershed around 1,566,450 acres (6,339.2 km^{2}) in an agricultural region. It arises near Champaign-Urbana and flows south to near Vincennes, Indiana. The name comes from French explorers, who used the French word, embarras, for river navigation obstacles, blockages, and difficulties relating to logjams.

== Course ==
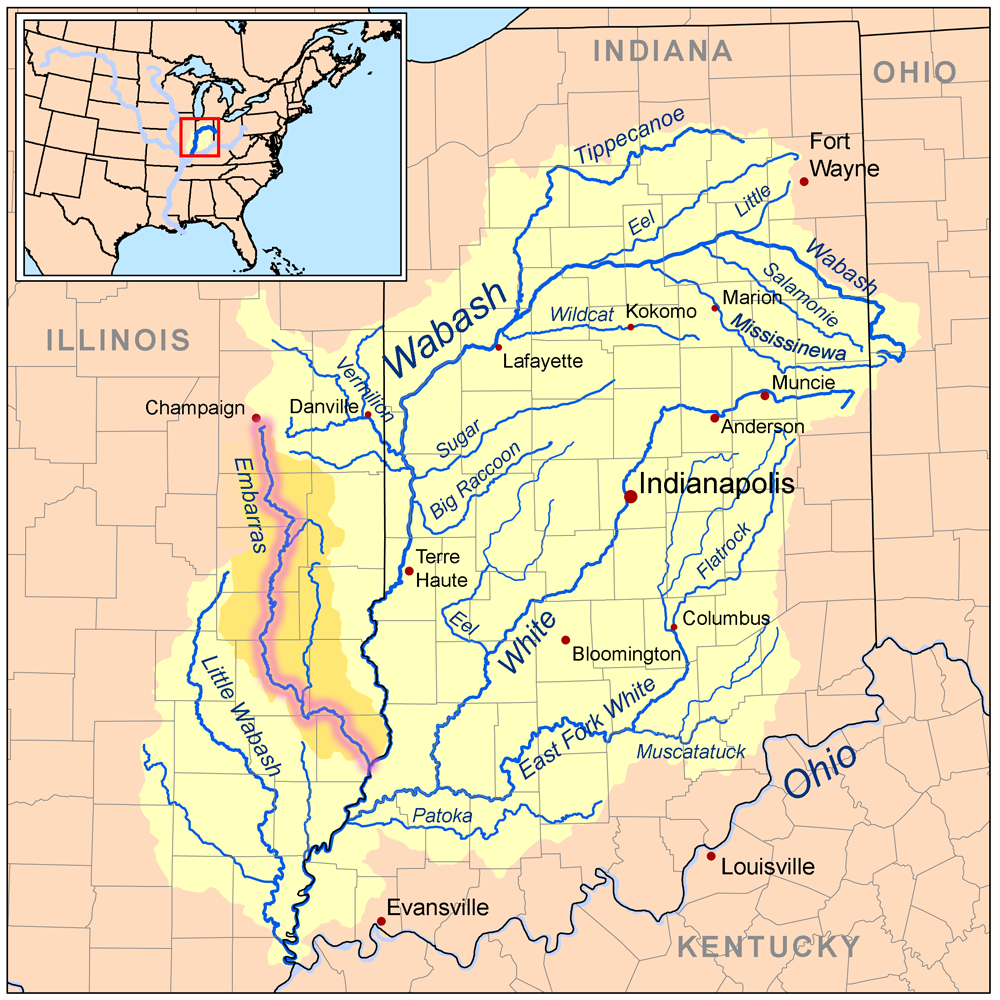
Map of the Embarras River highlighted within the Wabash River watershed

The Embarras River rises in Champaign County. The upper reaches of the Embarras include the detention ponds near the intersection of Windsor Road with U.S. Route 45 in southeastern Champaign; the southern portion of the University of Illinois campus, including the small creek near the Vet Med Building; and Meadowbrook Park in south Urbana.

The Embarras flows generally southward through Douglas, Coles, Cumberland, and Jasper Counties. In Jasper County, it turns southeast for the remainder of its course through Richland, Crawford, and Lawrence Counties. In Coles County, a dam helps create Lake Charleston. Portions of the river's lower course have been straightened and channelized. It joins the Wabash River 6 miles (10 km) southwest of Vincennes, Indiana.

Along its course, the Embarras passes the towns of Villa Grove, Camargo, Charleston, Greenup, Newton, Ste. Marie, and Lawrenceville.

== Tributaries ==
- In its upper course in Champaign County, the river collects the East Branch Embarras River, which rises in southwestern Vermilion County and flows 20.3 miles (32.7 km) generally westwardly in a channelized course, past the village of Broadlands. 39°53′25″N 88°10′50″W
- In Coles County, the Embarras collects the Little Embarras River, which rises in Edgar County and flows 19.6 miles (31.5 km) southwestwardly. 39°34′26″N 88°04′28″W
- In Jasper County, the Embarras collects the North Fork Embarras River, 64.0 miles (103.0 km) long, which rises in Edgar County and flows southwardly through Clark and Crawford Counties. 38°55′00″N 87°59′18″W

== Variant names ==
The United States Board on Geographic Names settled on "Embarras River" as the stream's official name in 1964. According to the Geographic Names Information System, it has also been known as the "Ambraw River" and as the "Embarrass River."

== Ecology ==
The only population of harlequin darters (Etheostoma histrio) in Illinois is found in the Embarras River.

== History ==
In the 18th century, the Embarras River was part of the trail from Cahokia to Vincennes. The river route was used by George Rogers Clark's forces during the Illinois Campaign.

== See also ==
- List of Illinois rivers
- Watersheds of Illinois
