= Marys River (Illinois) =

Physical characteristics
- Source
  - location: Randolph County, Illinois
  - coordinates: 38°11′07″N 89°37′40″W
- Mouth
  - location: Confluence with the Mississippi River
  - coordinates: 37°52′49″N 89°46′59″W
  - elevation: 354 ft (108 m)
- Length: 41 mi (66 km)

Basin features
- GNIS ID: 413088

Marys River is a tributary of the Mississippi River in Illinois. It drains a small watershed between the Big Muddy River and the Kaskaskia River. It joins the Mississippi just southeast of Chester, near Kaskaskia. Because of its proximity to Kaskaskia — the capital of Illinois Territory and the first capital of the State of Illinois — Marys River was the site of early settlements leading into the interior of Illinois.

Marys River is approximately 41 miles (66 km) in length.

== Cities and counties ==
The following cities and towns are in the Marys River basin:

- Steeleville
- Sparta

Parts of the following counties are in the Mary's River basin:

- Jackson County
- Perry County
- Randolph County

== See also ==
- List of Illinois rivers
