= Mackinaw River =

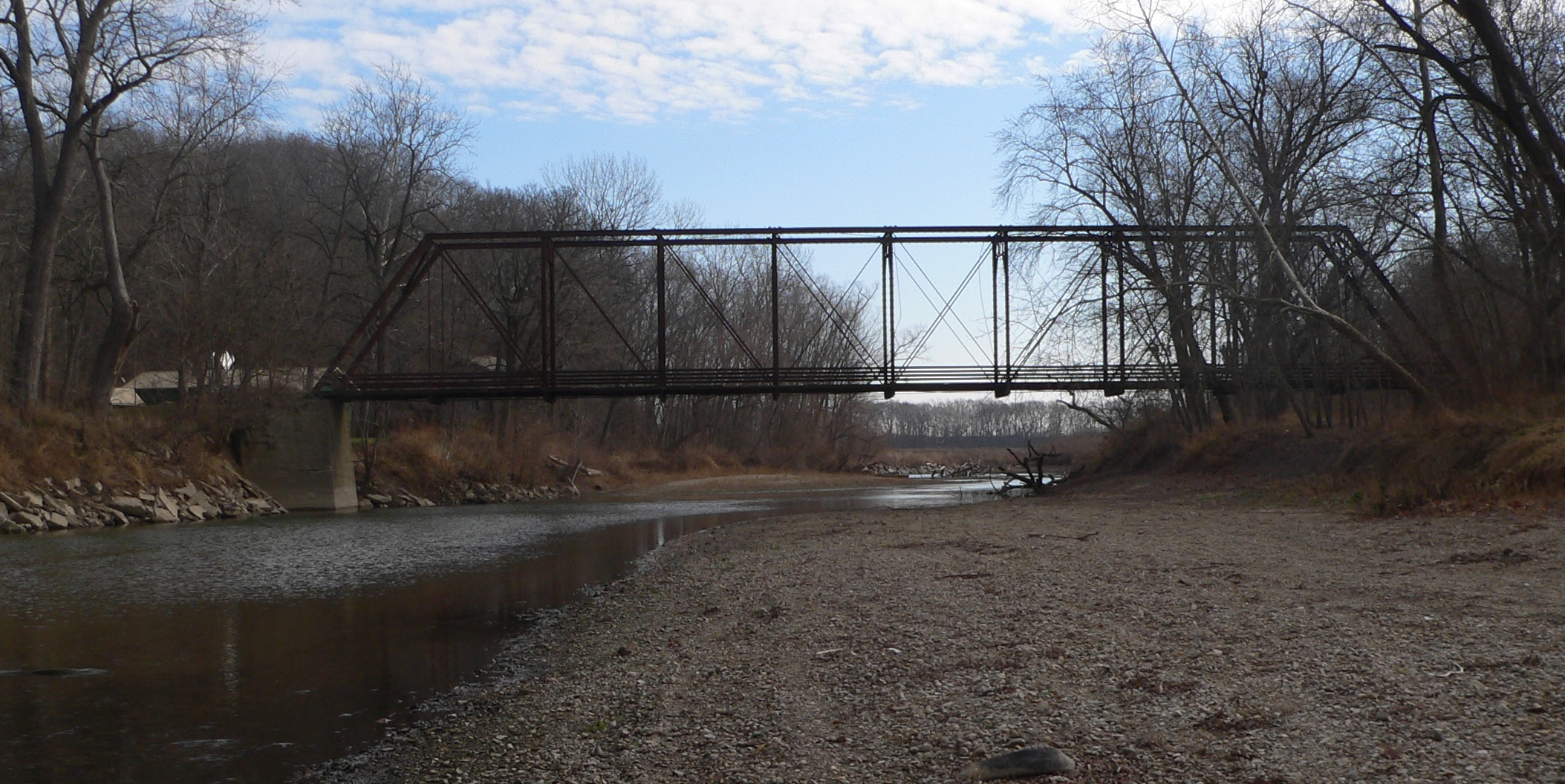
- Mackinaw River near Tremont, Illinois

Physical characteristics
- Source
  - location: Ford County east of Sibley, Illinois
  - coordinates: 40°35′20″N 88°21′59″W
- Mouth
  - location: Confluence with the Illinois River near Mapleton, Illinois
  - coordinates: 40°33′06″N 89°43′56″W
  - elevation: 443 ft (135 m)
- Length: 130 mi (210 km)
- Discharge
  - location: Green Valley, Illinois
  - average: 772 cu/ft. per sec.

Basin features
- Progression: Mackinaw River → Illinois → Mississippi → Gulf of Mexico
- GNIS ID: 403283

The Mackinaw River is a 130-mile-long (210 km) tributary of the Illinois River in the U.S. state of Illinois. Its watershed covers approximately 1,136 square miles (3,000 km^{2}), and contains some of the most productive agricultural land in the United States. The river itself maintains some of the highest quality streams in the state and provides habitat for 60-70 native fish species and 25-30 species of mussels. Its name, also spelled Mackinac, is derived from the Ojibwe word mikinaak meaning "turtle".

== Description ==
The Mackinaw River begins near Sibley, Illinois, in Ford County. From its headwaters the river flows west through McLean County, where it provides drainage to part of the Bloomington–Normal metropolitan area, and Woodford County. It continues west and then southwestward through Tazewell County before flowing into the Illinois River just south of Pekin.

The river flows through three natural divisions, including the Grand Prairie, Upper Mississippi River and Illinois Bottomlands, and Illinois and Mississippi Sand Areas. Early in its life, several thousand years ago following the Wisconsin glaciation, it cut through several moraines, which influenced the structure of the riverbed. The upper section of the watershed is marked by a series of pools and fast-flowing riffles. The character of the river downstream of the moraines is markedly different, with a relatively wide floodplain, large meanders and erosion-prone sandy banks. Its principal tributaries are Panther, Walnut and Money creeks, and the Little Mackinaw River.

== History ==
People of the Hopewell culture lived in the area 1,700 to 2,100 years ago. The Kickapoo, Potawatomi, Chippewa, and Ottawa peoples also fished, hunted and lived along the river for several centuries, through the 1830s. In 1853 a group of 200 Kickapoo still lived along the river but they were expected to move to a reservation in Missouri the next year.

There are only a few villages along or near the Mackinaw River. These include (beginning up stream): Sibley, Colfax, Lexington, and Mackinaw. Each was laid out prior to the arrival of the railroad in the region during the 1850s, which diminished the importance of river transport.

The Mackinaw River State Fish and Wildlife Area is a 1,448-acre (586 ha) state park along the river in Tazewell County. Operated by the Illinois Department of Natural Resources, the area provides opportunities for fishing, canoeing, hiking, hunting and general interaction with nature.

== See also ==
- List of Illinois rivers
