= Huntley (name) =

Huntley is an English surname or, more rarely, a masculine given name. Notable people with the name include:

== Surname ==
=== Arts, entertainment and media ===
- Accabre Huntley (born 1967), British poet of Guyanese parentage
- Chet Huntley (1911–1974), American television newscaster
- Dennis Huntley (1928–2021), British sculptor
- Florence Huntley (1861–1912), American journalist, editor, writer
- Francis Huntley (c.1787–1831), English actor
- Fred Huntley (1862–1931), London-born American silent film actor and director
- George Huntley (musician), American singer, guitarist and songwriter
- John Huntley (film historian) (1921–2003), British film historian, educator and archivist
- Noah Huntley (born 1974), English actor
- Paul Huntley (1933–2021), British wigmaker and hair designer
- Raymond Huntley (1904–1990), English screen actor
- Storm Huntley (born 1987), Scottish television presenter
- Victoria Hutson Huntley (1900–1971), American artist and printmaker
- William A. Huntley (1843–1929), American composer, banjoist, music teacher

=== Government and politics ===
- Eric L. Huntley (1929–2026), Guyanese-born British activist and publisher
- Frederick Huntley (1825–1907), American pioneer and politician from Wisconsin
- George Huntley (MP) (c. 1512–1580), politician in England
- Henry Vere Huntley (1795–1864), English naval officer and colonial administrator
- Jessica Huntley (1927–2013), Guyanese-born British publisher and women's rights activist
- Mark Huntley (1956–2025), American politician from Vermont
- Shirley Huntley (born 1938), American politician
- Thomas Huntley (born 1938), American politician
- Wade Huntley, American activist

=== Sport ===
- Alex Huntley (born 2001), American football player
- C. J. Huntley (born 2002), American basketball player
- Caleb Huntley (born 1998), American football player
- David Huntley (1957–2017), Canadian lacrosse player and coach
- Jason Huntley (born 1998), American football player
- John Huntley (cricketer) (1883—1944), Australian-born New Zealand cricketer
- Joni Huntley (born 1956), American athlete
- Keith Huntley (1931–1995), Welsh footballer
- Kevin Huntley (American football) (born 1982), American and Canadian football player
- Kevin Huntley (lacrosse) (born 1985), Canadian lacrosse player
- Richard Huntley (born 1972), American football player
- Tyler Huntley (born 1998), American football player

=== Other fields ===
- Brian Huntley (born 1944), South African scientist
- Elias DeWitt Huntley (1840–1909), Methodist clergyman, Chaplain of the US Senate
- Horace Huntley (born 1942), American professor, historian of civil rights etc.
- Ian Huntley (1974–2026), committed the Soham murders of two children
- Joseph Huntley, 19th-century English biscuit maker
- Lewis Huntley (1816–1862), co-founder of the city of DeKalb, Illinois
- Robert Huntley (1929–2015), American attorney, businessman and law professor
- Russell Huntley (born 1807), co-founder of the city of DeKalb, Illinois

== Given name ==
- Huntley Bakich (born 1972), American football player
- Huntley Gordon (1887–1956), Quebec-born American actor
- Huntley Gordon (racing driver) (1883–1967), American racing driver
- Huntley N. Spaulding (1869–1955), American manufacturer and politician from New Hampshire
- Huntley Wright (1868–1941), English actor, comedian, dancer and singer

== See also ==
- Huntley (disambiguation)
- Hundley (surname)
- Hunley (surname)
