= Rothbury (disambiguation) =

Rothbury may refer to:

== Places ==
Australia

- Rothbury, New South Wales, a small town in the City of Cessnock

England

- Rothbury, a town and civil parish in the County of Northumberland

United States

- Rothbury, Michigan, a village in Oceana County

== Other uses ==
- Rothbury Festival, a four-day music festival held in 2008 and 2009 in Rothbury, Michigan
- Rothbury Riot, an incident that occurred in 1929 at Rothbury, New South Wales
- Rothbury Terrier, a breed of dog also known as the Bedlington Terrier
- For the Rothbury Hotel in Brisbane, Australia, see Shell House, Brisbane
