= George H. Gurler House =

Historic house in Illinois, United States

- U.S. National Register of Historic Places
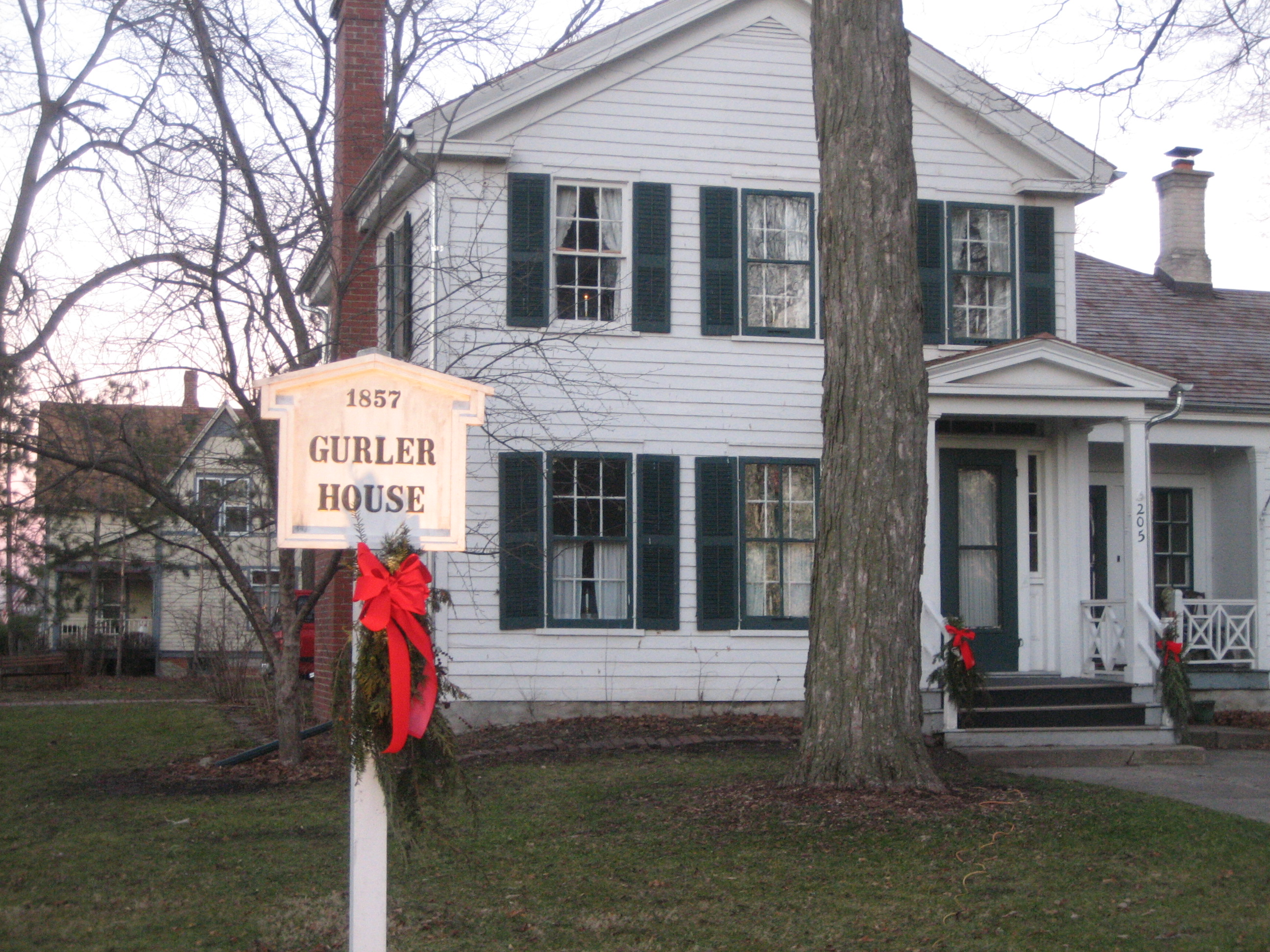
- The 1857 Gurler House in DeKalb, Illinois

- Location within Illinois Location within the United States
- Location: 205 Pine St., DeKalb, Illinois
- Coordinates: 41°56′00″N 88°45′02″W
- Area: less than one acre
- Built: 1857
- Architectural style: Greek Revival
- NRHP reference No.: 79003158
- Added to NRHP: March 21, 1979

The George H. Gurler House or simply, the Gurler House, is a home in DeKalb, Illinois. The home is listed on the National Register of Historic Places to which it was added in 1979. The home was built in 1857 and was occupied by members of George H. Gurler's extended family as early as 1888. Gurler was the co-founder of the Gurler Brothers Creamery. Gurler was also the president of the DeKalb County Farmer's Institute, the predecessor of the American Farm Bureau Federation.

== Architecture ==
The Gurler House was constructed in the Greek Revival style of architecture.

It was possibly designed by Jacob Haish.

== History ==
=== The early years ===
The Gurler House is estimated to have been constructed in 1857; however, county records are not available for that time period. A sign in the front yard of the Gurler House lists it as 1857, and the Gurler Heritage Association celebrated the sesquicentennial of the house in 2007. In approximately 1857, a local banker, Ellzey Young, had the home built for himself and his new bride, Alida Ellwood. Alida was the younger sister of barbed wire baron Isaac Ellwood (http://www.ellwoodhouse.org/). George Gurler would not purchase the home until years later. There are conflicting reports on the original owners of the property. One assertion is that Wyman constructed the home and sold it to the Gurlers, which was also stated by Beatrice "Bea" Gurler in an interview with the Daily Chronicle in DeKalb. However, according to the property abstract this is simply not true.

According to that document the Gurler House, as it eventually would become known, began its history as an 80-acre (32 ha) tract of land sold by the U.S. government to Steven S. Jones on April 13, 1844. Jones was a resident of Kane County. It is possible that Jones was a land speculator who gathered up pieces of property scattered across northeast Illinois. The 1878 collection "Past and Present of Kane County, Illinois," described Jones as a St. Charles attorney born on July 23, 1813, in Barry, Vermont. He moved to Illinois in June 1838 with his wife Lavinia where he has been credited with naming St. Charles.

In 1846 the family sold the 80 acres (32 ha) in DeKalb (then known as Huntley's Grove) to Russell Huntley, a founding settler of DeKalb. Huntley, with his brother Lewis, co-owned the property until 1851 when an entry in the abstract indicates that John M. Goodell, another early DeKalb settler, received the land as a result of legal action against the Huntleys. Regardless, Goodell eventually sold the parcel back to Lewis Huntley in 1853. Huntley then platted the land as an addition to the town. He laid out 93 city lots in all.

=== Construction ===
The property that would eventually become the Gurler House was sold to the man who would eventually construct the home which would become the Gurler House, Ellzey P. Young, in 1857. Young along with his wife Alida Young (who was the younger sister of Isaac Ellwood) paid Huntley $320 for the three lots that make up the property where the Gurler House stands today. This entry on the property abstract confirms the widely held and long standing belief that the house was constructed in 1857. There is, however, another possibility.

If the second possibility were true it would mean that the Gurler House is one year younger than it is traditionally thought to be, being built in 1858 instead of 1857. Records show that Young took out a mortgage on the land for $537 in February 1858. It is thought that this money could have given the Youngs enough cash to build the Gurler House over a more humble home such as a log cabin.

=== The Gurlers move in ===
The Gurler family, under the patriarchy of George, moved into the home in 1893. Gurler's nephews, sons of his brother Henry, with whom he had started the dairy that led to their success, had occupied the home since 1888 and did until Gurler moved in. The Gurler Brothers Creamery's proprietary milking and manufacturing process was later sold to HP Hood in exchange for 5% claim of the Hood company. The partial ownership of HP Hood and Gurler House were eventually inherited by heir Emrah Gurler who then donated the home to the DeKalb Historical Society.

Beatrice Gurler, daughter of George H. Gurler, lived in the house until her death in 1977. Shortly thereafter, community members, including Mary Osborn and James and Helen Merritt, worked together to save the house from being demolished, partially paying for the property with Community Development Block Grant money invested by the city of DeKalb. The story is a very interesting one, with many twists and turns, to be found in a history prepared by Northern Illinois University Students and currently resting on the piano in the Gurler House community room.

== See also ==
- Henry B. Gurler
- George H. Gurler
- Gurler Brothers Creamery
