= John Huntley =

John Huntley can refer to:

- John Huntley (cricketer) (1883-1944), New Zealand cricketer
- John Huntley (film historian) (1921-2003), English film historian
- John Huntley (footballer) (born 1967), English footballer
