= Glen Huntly (disambiguation) =

Glen Huntly is a suburb of Melbourne, Victoria, Australia.

Glen Huntly or Glenhuntly or variant, may refer to:

- Glen Huntly, Victoria, Australia; a suburb of Melbourne
- Glen Huntly railway station, Glen Huntly, Melbourne, Victoria, Australia
- Glenhuntly tram depot, Caulfield South, Melbourne, Victoria, Australia
- Electoral district of Glenhuntly, Victoria, Australia

== See also ==
- Huntley (disambiguation)
- Huntly (disambiguation)
- Glen (disambiguation)
