= Brian Huntley =

South African conservation scientist (born 1944)

Brian John Huntley
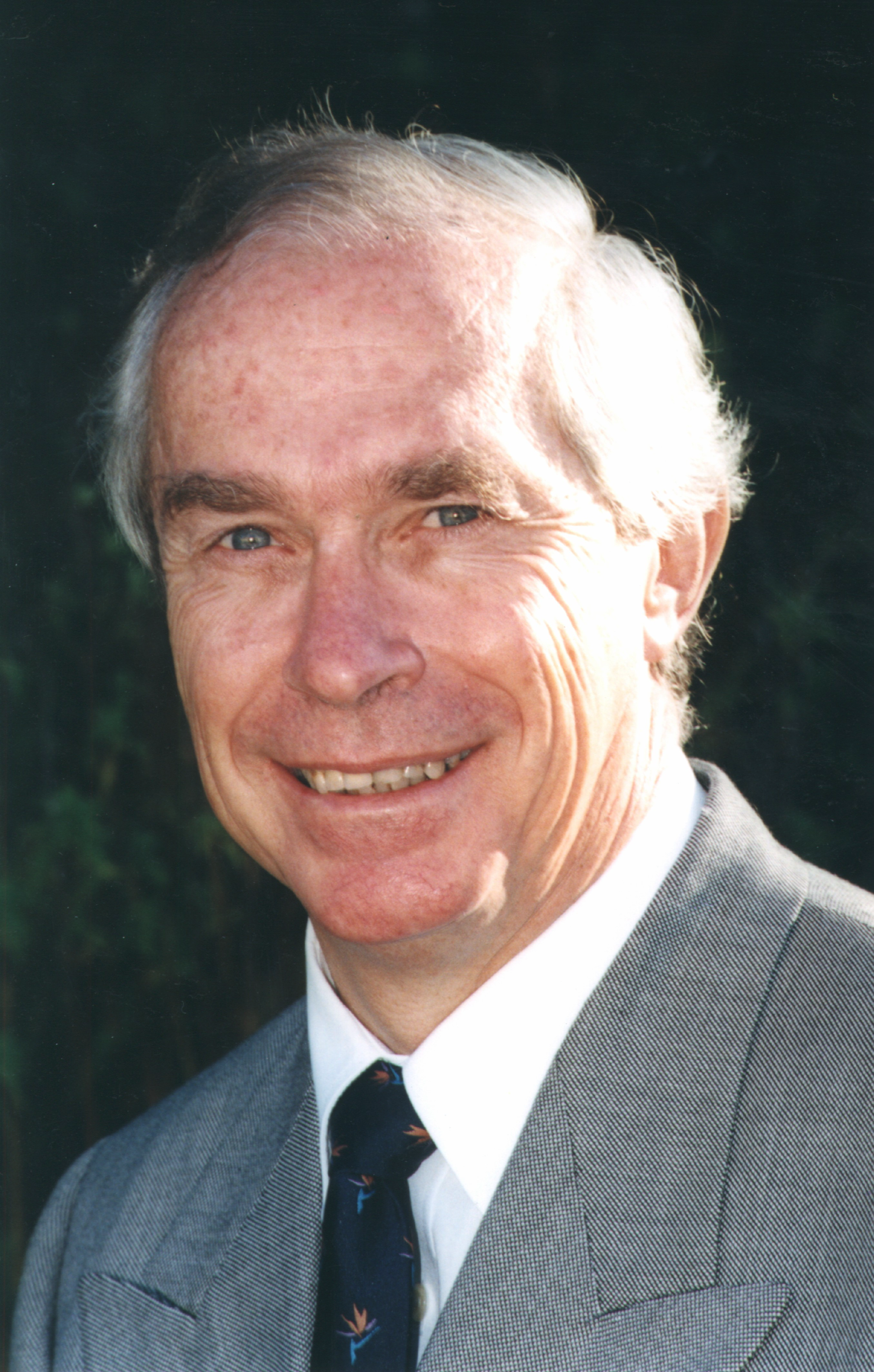
- Born: 1944 (age 80–81); Durban, South Africa
- Education: University of Natal (Bachelor of Science degree, Master of Science degree)
- Occupations: Government ecologist in Angola; Chief Executive Officer in National Botanical Institute (later SANBI); member of the Academy of Science of South Africa; Research Associate at the Centre for Invasion Biology, Stellenbosch University; Senior policy adviser to the Department of Environmental Affairs and Tourism
- Organizations: United Nations agencies; International Union of Biological Sciences; International Union for Conservation of Nature; Botanic Gardens Conservation International
- Known for: Was a conservation scientist from South Africa. Expanded the National Botanical Institute into South African National Biodiversity Institute, an authoritative repository on South African flora and fauna. Was a consultant for agencies and international organizations, including the United Nations, with regard to nature conservation. Took part in multiple conservation projects around Africa.
- Title: Emeritus Professor at the University of Cape Town
- Awards: Edward T. La Roe III Memorial Award

Brian John Huntley (born 1944) is a retired professor and conservation scientist from South Africa, best known for developing and transforming African national parks. He was involved in expanding the National Botanical Institute (later SANBI) to become an authoritative repository on South African flora and fauna. As an independent expert, he was a consultant for agencies and international organizations, including the United Nations, with regard to nature conservation. He himself took part in multiple conservation projects around Africa.

== Early life, education and first expedition ==
Huntley was born in Durban, South Africa, in 1944. His parents and grandparents encouraged the boy's interest in natural history. It may have been in his blood; in 1850 his great-great-grandfather introduced nurseryman and seedsman businesses to South African people, along with getting first trees to the Transvaal gold fields workers by sending oxwagon loads northwards from Pietermaritzburg. As a teenager, Huntley discovered the term ecology and used it to define his career path. He enjoyed investigating the landscape of Natal, and later, inspired by Ian Garland, Roddy Ward and others, he kept exploring Ngoye, Mkuzi, St Lucia, and parts of Zululand during his school days.

To get his Bachelor of Science degree, Huntley spent a year at the University of Pretoria, and then earned his Master of Science degree at the University of Natal. In 1965–1966, he took part in the Biological-Geological Expedition to the Prince Edward Islands – the first ever expedition to the area – as a plant ecologist. The expedition's findings were used for his MSc thesis and were published in the expedition's monograph.

== Career ==
After graduation, Huntley's first job—with the Transvaal Division of Nature Conservation—took him to the bushveld of the Waterberg and beyond the Soutpansberg range.

=== Work in Angola and South Africa (1970–1989) ===
In 1970, Huntley visited Angola for the first time. A year later, he moved there with his wife, accepting an offer to be a government ecologist. He spent four years exploring the country, developing new national parks, and making recommendations for nature conservation. In August 1975, while the country was on the verge of the Civil War, the Huntleys fled the country as refugees (with around 10,000 others) and returned to South Africa.

The family settled in Pretoria, where Huntley got a job as Scientific Coordinator for the Savanna Ecosystem Project, a multidisciplinary study initiated by the Council for Scientific and Industrial Research (CSIR). This research provided a research model used in multiple studies of South African landscapes. Huntley worked as a Scientific Coordinator for 14 years.

=== National Botanical Institute and South African National Biodiversity Institute ===
In 1990, the National Botanical Institute at Kirstenbosch was established, and Huntley was chosen as its first chief executive officer.

In 2004, Huntley signed South Africa's new Biodiversity Act, turning the National Botanical Institute into the South African National Biodiversity Institute (SANBI), the largest and most active South African institution in regard to biodiversity. The new institute became a nationwide scientific repository and bore responsibility for biodiversity research, implementation, and education across the country.

Under Huntley's leadership, SANBI launched four major bio-regional programmes and one hundred school-based environmental projects.

Huntley left his position at SANBI in 2007.

=== Later positions ===
After leaving SANBI in 2007, Huntley served as a senior policy adviser to the Department of Environmental Affairs and Tourism for two years, retiring in 2009.

Huntley's opinion was often sought by international organizations such as the UNEP, the UNDP, and UNESCO. In later years, Huntley became an independent consultant, taking part in conservation projects in multiple African countries, working with several United Nations agencies, and reviewing conservation projects all around the world.

=== Other positions, scientific and academic contribution ===
Over the years, Huntley became a member of the Academy of Science of South Africa; Professor Emeritus at the University of Cape Town; and a research associate at the Centre for Invasion Biology Stellenbosch University.

After his return to South Africa in 1975, Huntley started and successfully finished three interdisciplinary cooperative research projects: the Savanna Ecosystem Project (1975–1990), the Fynbos Biome Project (1977–1990), and the Southern African Botanical Diversity Network (SABONET) (1994–2002).

Huntley has always been fond of Lusophone Africa, and worked closely with conservation activities in Angola and Mozambique. His participation in international panels and committees, such as the International Union of Biological Sciences (IUBS) and Botanic Gardens Conservation International (BGCI) were of huge advantage in supporting African institutions and initiatives at a global level. He also took part in a number of international panels and committees, including the Scientific Committee on Problems of the Environment (SCOPE), International Union for Conservation of Nature (IUCN), and Scientific and Technical Advisory Panel of the Global Environment Facility (GEF–STAP).

During his career, Huntley frequently published on ecological and environmental conservation issues.

== Personal life ==
During his career, Huntley traveled extensively. He visited Sub-Antarctic tundra and Congo rainforests, the forests of Zululand, the savannas of northern South Africa, the national parks of Angola, and more. In general, he visited over 50 countries, learning to speak Portuguese and Afrikaans in addition to English.

In retirement, Huntley and his wife settled in a small village near the southernmost tip of Africa, between the Kogelberg Mountains and the sea.

== Awards ==
Huntley received the Edward T. La Roe III Memorial Award in 2011. It was given to him for his leadership skills and ability to protect biodiversity and manage ecosystems in South Africa and Southern Africa.

== See also ==
- KwaZulu-Natal
- South African National Biodiversity Institute
- Ian Garland

== Literature cited ==
- Willis, Christopher, ed. (22 December 1997), "Profile: Brian Huntley", Sabonet News, vol. 2, no. 3, Pretoria: Southern African Botanical Diversity Network, p. 82, ISSN 1027-4286, OCLC 35897105
- "Brian Huntley receives international conservation award", Centre of Excellence for Invasion Biology, Stellenbosch: Stellenbosch University, 1 December 2011
- "December 15 Presentation: Conservation Scientist Dr. Brian Huntley", angolafieldgroup.com, Maianga: Angola Field Group, 9 December 2011
- "Huntley, Brian John (1944-)", JSTOR, New York: Ithaka Harbors, 11 July 2012, JSTOR 000118608, OCLC 46609535
- "Consultants", ebdglo.com, Rio de Janeiro: EBD Global Optimum, 1 January 2019
- Moloi-Motsepe, Precious, ed. (2020), "Academy of Science of South Africa members", University of Cape Town, Cape Town: Academy of Science of South Africa
- Cherry, Michael (17 May 2005), "South Africa—Serious about Biodiversity Science", PLOS Biology, 3 (5) (145 ed.), San Francisco: PLOS: 743–747, doi:10.1371/journal.pbio.0030145, LCCN 2003212293, OCLC 1039259630, PMC 1110916, PMID 15884973
- Huntley, Brian J. (31 October 2012), Cole, Donna (ed.), "South African botany - the Scottish connection", Sibbaldia: the Journal of Botanic Garden Horticulture, no. 10, Edinburgh: Royal Botanic Garden Edinburgh, pp. 5–12, doi:10.24823/Sibbaldia.2012.63, ISSN 2513-9231, OCLC 122953400
