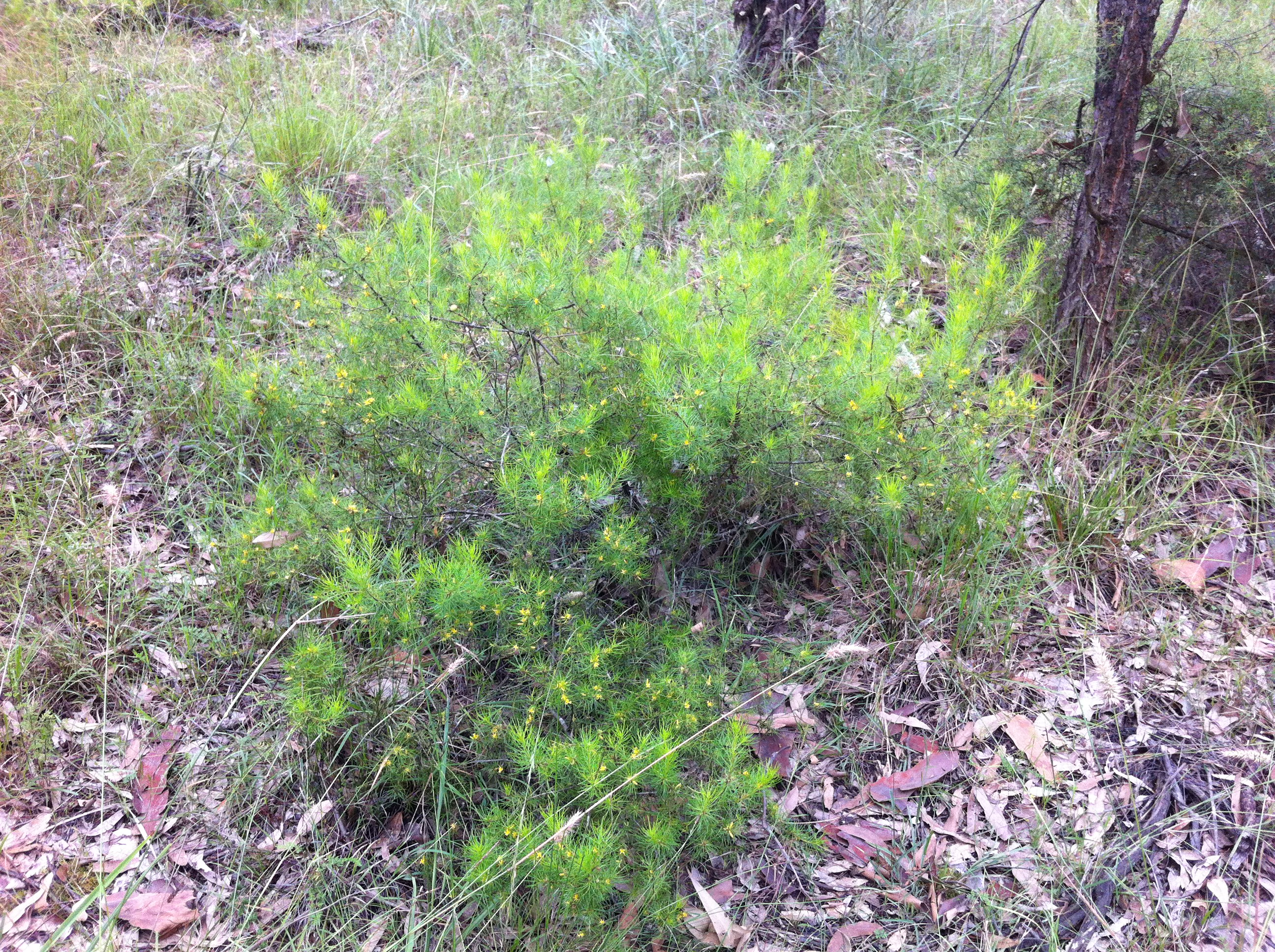

Conservation status
- Critically endangered (EPBC Act)

Scientific classification
- Kingdom: Plantae
- Clade: Tracheophytes
- Clade: Angiosperms
- Clade: Eudicots
- Order: Proteales
- Family: Proteaceae
- Genus: Persoonia
- Species: P. pauciflora

Binomial name
- Persoonia pauciflora P.H.Weston

= Persoonia pauciflora =

North Rothbury persoonia

Species of flowering plant

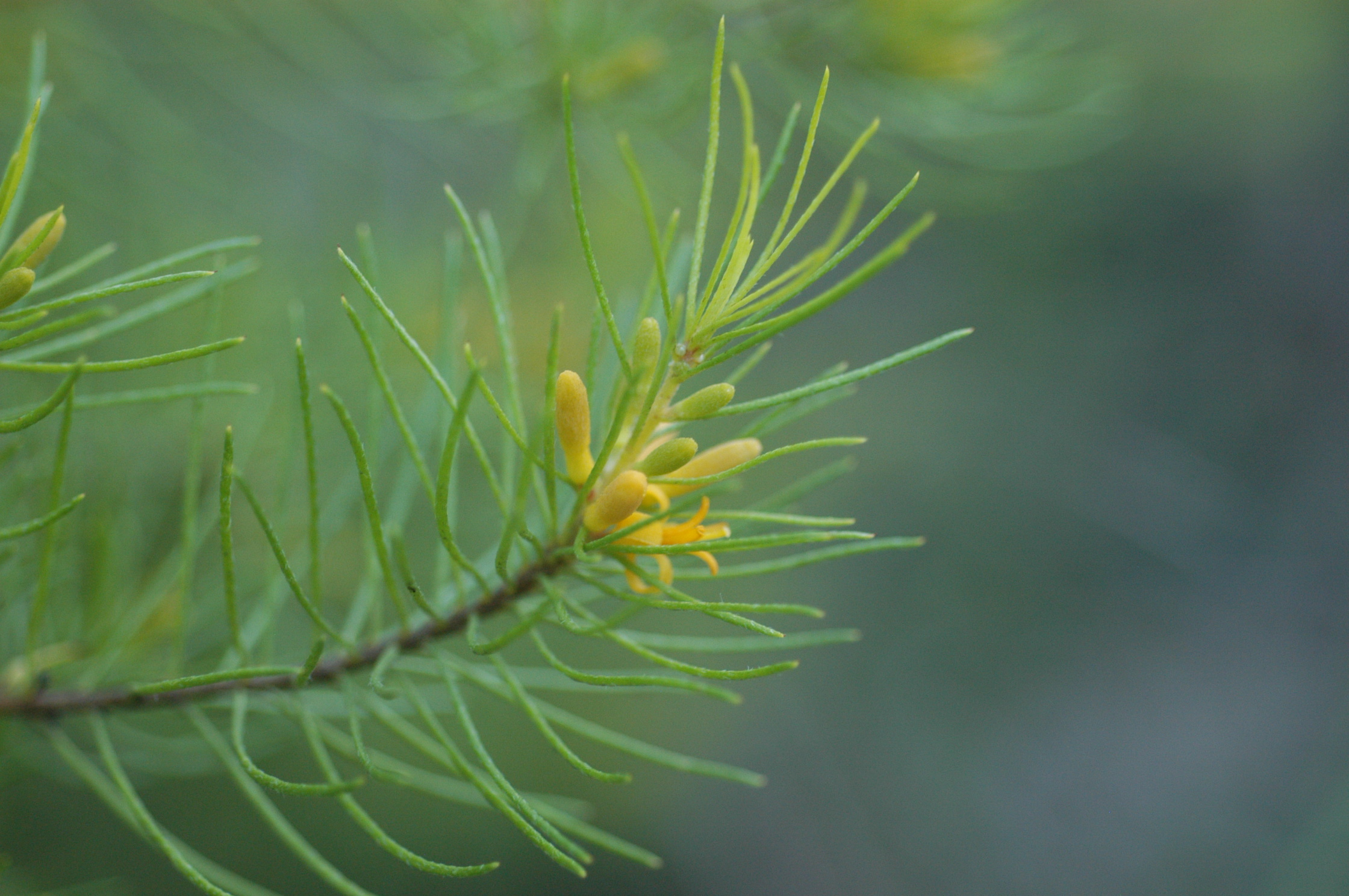
Close-up of the leaves and flowers of P. pauciflora

Persoonia pauciflora, commonly known as the North Rothbury persoonia, is a species of flowering plant in the family Proteaceae and is endemic to a small area of New South Wales. It is a small, spreading shrub with bright green, thread-like leaves and a relatively small number of yellow flowers in summer. A recently described species, it is similar to P. isophylla but has fewer and shorter flowers than that species. A very restricted distribution has led to its classification as "critically endangered" under the Australian Government Environment Protection and Biodiversity Conservation Act 1999.

== Description ==
Persoonia pauciflora is a spreading shrub which grows to 100–140 cm (40–60 in) high and 40–200 cm (20–80 in) wide. Its leaves and branches are moderately hairy when young and the bark is smooth and grey. Its leaves are bright green, thread-like, 17–35 mm (0.7–1 in) and less than 1 mm (0.04 in) in diameter.

Flowering occurs throughout the year but peaks in the period from January to April. The flowers are few in number and arranged in groups of up to nine in leaf axils at or near the ends of the branches on a slightly hairy stalk 1–2.5 mm (0.04–0.1 in) long. Each individual flower consists of a cylindrical perianth that splits into four segments or tepals, and contains both male and female parts. Within this, the central style is surrounded by the anther, which splits into four segments; these curl back and resemble a cross when viewed from above. They provide a landing area for insects attending to the stigma, which is located at the tip of the style. The tepals are 4.5–8 mm (0.2–0.3 in) slightly hairy and dull yellow. Flowering is followed by the development of fruit, which are green or reddish-green oval, glabrous drupes, 9–11 mm (0.35–0.43 in) long and about 15 mm (0.6 in) wide.

== Taxonomy and naming ==
Ecological consultant Gordon Patrick came across the then-unknown shrub in the North Rothbury area of the Hunter Valley in September 1997. What was to become the type specimen was collected in January 1998 by Patrick and Peter Weston, and lodged at the New South Wales Herbarium. The new species was described as Persoonia pauciflora in 1999 by Weston and the description was published in Telopea. The generic name Persoonia is derived from the name of South African botanist Christiaan Hendrik Persoon. The specific epithet (pauciflora) is from the Latin words paucus meaning "few" or "little" and flos meaning "flower" or "blossom" referring to the small number of flowers of this species, easily distinguishing it from others in the genus.

It is classified within the genus as within the Lanceolata group, which consists of 58 closely related species with similar flowers but very different foliage. These species will often interbreed with each other in areas where two members of the group occur. Based on leaf shape, its closest relatives appear to be Persoonia isophylla and Persoonia pinifolia. However, unlike those two species, it grows on heavier, clay-based soils rather than sandstone soils.

== Distribution and habitat ==
The North Rothbury persoonia grows on clay soils in dry sclerophyll forest or woodland, under broad-leaved red ironbark (Eucalyptus fibrosa), grey box (E. moluccana), grey gum (E. punctata), and spotted gum (Corymbia maculata), with an understorey of shrubs and grasses. It only occurs in the North Rothbury area and occupies an area of only 2.5 km^{2} (600 acres) and linear range of 4.3 km (2.7 mi). All specimens have been found within 2.5 km (1.6 mi) of the original collection.

== Ecology ==
This persoonia lacks a lignotuber and since other smooth-barked persoonias such as P. mollis are killed by fire, it is likely that this species only reproduces from seed. New plants are produced from long-lived seed stored in the ground. Plants do not produce viable seed until they are at least eighteen months to three years old and have a lifespan of seven to twelve years. Many kinds of insects visit the flowers but which species pollinate the flowers is not known. The fruit is thought to be eaten by large birds such as currawongs and by larger mammals which then disperse the seed in their droppings. The seeds have a hard coat and the trigger for germination is not known, although new plants often appear after heavy rain.

Staff at the Mount Annan Botanic Garden who have been researching the factors affecting persoonia germination, have discovered that a bowerbird was taking the fruit of P. pauciflora from their experiments, offering a possible insight into how bird scat affects germination.

== Conservation ==
Fewer than 400 mature individual plants of P. pauciflora remain in two populations and a further 107 seedlings and immature plants were recorded in 2016. The main threats to the species are habitat loss and fragmentation due to clearing for residential development, illegal clearing and picking, and habitat degradation resulting from grazing and slashing. P. pauciflora is classified as an "endangered species" under the New South Wales Threatened Species Conservation Act 1995 and as "critically endangered" under the Australian Government Environment Protection and Biodiversity Conservation Act 1999.
