= Hunley (disambiguation) =

Hunley is a surname.

Hunley may also refer to:

== Ships ==
- USS Hunley, a Hunley-class submarine tender
  - Hunley-class submarine tender, of the U.S. Navy
- H. L. Hunley, a submarine in Confederate service which was the first submarine to successfully sink a ship

== Other uses ==
- The Hunley, a 1999 telefilm about the American Civil War submarine Hunley

== See also ==
- Hundley (surname)
- Huntley (disambiguation)
