= Huntley =

Huntley may refer to:

== Places ==
=== Australia ===
- Huntley, New South Wales (Wollongong), a suburb
- Huntley, a locality in City of Orange (New South Wales)

=== Canada ===
- Huntley, Prince Edward Island
- Huntley Township, Ontario

=== England ===
- Huntley, Gloucestershire
- Huntley, Staffordshire, a UK location

=== United States ===
- Huntley (plantation), Virginia
- Huntley, Illinois
- Huntley, Minnesota
- Huntley, Montana
- Huntley, Nebraska
- Huntley, Wyoming

=== Elsewhere ===
- Huntley School, New Zealand

== Other uses ==
- Huntley (name), people so named
- Huntley Project, a 1907 irrigation project in Montana, US
- Huntley & Palmers, a British biscuit makers

== See also ==
- Huntly (disambiguation)
- Hundley, a surname
- Huntlee, New South Wales, Australia
- Huntleigh, Missouri
- Hunley (disambiguation)
