= North Rothbury, New South Wales =

North Rothbury
- Suburb
- Coordinates: 32°40′52″S 151°20′56″E
- Country: Australia
- State: New South Wales
- Region: Hunter
- City: Cessnock
- LGA: Cesnock
- Location: 16.9 km (10.5 mi) N of Cessnock; 41.2 km (25.6 mi) WNW of Newcastle; 116.2 km (72.2 mi) N of Sydney

Government
  - State electorate: Cessnock
  - Federal division: Hunter
- Elevation: 72 m (236 ft)

Population
  - Total: 2,502 (2021 census)
- Time zone: UTC+10 (AEST)
  - Summer (DST): UTC+11 (AEST)
- Postcode: 2335
- County: Northumberland
- Gazetted: 23 October 2015 (locality)
Suburbs around North Rothbury
Branxton	Branxton	Greta
Belford	North Rothbury	Greta
Rothbury	Lovedale	Lovedale

North Rothbury is a town in the Hunter Region of New South Wales, Australia. It is 17 km from Cessnock. The town is experiencing rapid population growth, with the population ballooning from 898 to 2,502 between 2016 and 2021, largely in part due to the development of the Huntlee estates. Rothbury is another small settlement roughly 5km to the southwest.

The town has a memorial to the 1929 Rothbury Riot.

The town is home to a small population of the critically endangered North Rothbury Persoonia (Persoonia pauciflora).
