= Huntly (disambiguation) =

Huntly is a historic town in Aberdeenshire, Scotland.

Huntly may also refer to:

== Places ==
- Huntly, Victoria, Australia
  - Huntly railway station, Victoria
- Huntly, Western Australia, near Dwellingup, Western Australia, place of a bauxite mine
- Shire of Huntly, Victoria, Australia
- Huntly, New Zealand
- Huntly, Virginia, United States
- Huntly Township, Marshall County, Minnesota, United States

== People ==
- John Huntly (fl. 1882–1883), American politician
- Moira Huntly (born 1932), British artist and author
- Nancy Huntly, professor of ecology and evolutionary biology
- Huntly Ketchen (1872–1959) Canadian soldier and politician
- Huntly D. Millar (1927–2016), founder and CEO of Millar, Inc

=== Titles ===
- Earl of Huntly (1445–1599)
- Marquess of Huntly (created 1599) the oldest existing marquessate in Scotland, held by sometime Chiefs of Clan Gordon

== Other ==
- Huntly Castle
- Huntly F.C.
- Edgar Huntly, a 1799 novel by American author Charles Brockden Brown

== See also ==
- Huntley (disambiguation)
- Huntlee, New South Wales, Australia
- Huntleigh, Missouri
