= Rothbury, New South Wales =

Coordinates: 32°45′S 151°20′E

Rothbury
- Town
- Country: Australia
- State: New South Wales
- LGA: City of Cessnock

Population
  - Total: 55 (SAL 2021)

Rothbury is a small town located in the Hunter Region of New South Wales, Australia. It is 10 km from Cessnock. At the 2011 census, Rothbury had a population of 452 people. North Rothbury is another small settlement about 5km to the northeast. The town is 8 km from Pokolbin's vineyards.

The name of Rothbury became notorious for the Rothbury Riot when police shot into a crowd of miners killing Norman Brown and injuring many more, during a lockout of miners at the local colliery on 16 December 1929. A monument in honour of Norman Brown is located at North Rothbury.
