= Hunley =

Hunley is a surname. Notable people with the surname include:

== People ==
- Andrea Hunley, American politician
- Con Hunley (born 1945), American country music singer
- Gary Hunley (born 1948), American child actor
- Helen Hunley (1920–2010), Canadian politician
- Horace Lawson Hunley (1823–1863), American marine engineer
- Lamonte Hunley (born 1963), American football player
- Leann Hunley (born 1955), American actor
- Ricky Hunley (born 1961), American football player

== Fictional characters ==
- Alan Hunley, a fictional character from the 2018 film Mission: Impossible – Fallout

== See also ==
- Hundley (surname)
- Huntley (name)
- Hunley (disambiguation)
