= John Hundley =

John Walker Hundley (born July 4, 1899, Hightstown, New Jersey – died April 17, 1990, New York City) was an American musical comedy actor, singer, and, later, a CBS television executive. Hundley was the namesake of his grandfather, the Reverend John Walker Hundley (1841–1914), a well known Baptist Minister in Virginia.

On the Broadway stage, Hundley performed in musical comedies in the 1920s and 1930s. In 1929, he took over as the leading man for the Broadway premiere of Polly, a musical based on the 1917 hit comedy Polly With a Past. He supplanted Archie Leach, later better known as Cary Grant, who had played the role in the out-of-town try-outs. In Spring Is Here (1929, score by Rodgers and Hart), he introduced the well known number "With a Song in My Heart".

Hundley joined CBS Television in 1938. He rose from network announcer to various executive positions in programming and sales, including a stint as editor of "program practices", i.e., program censorship: in the era of live television, he would screen certain performers for sobriety and verify that necklines of women's dresses conformed to CBS standards.

Hundley married Eleanor Rothschild in New York in 1932. He lived at 168 East 74th Street, in Manhattan, New York City.

== Sources ==
- John Hundley at IMDb
