= George H. Gurler =

American businessman

George Hopkins Gurler (March 29, 1844 – 1940) was a prominent American businessman in DeKalb, Illinois. Gurler, along with his brother Henry, founded a successful dairy, Gurler Brothers Creamery, where they were regional leaders in the field of milk production. After the brothers split in 1895, Gurler and his son Charles established a large network of creameries in Illinois and Iowa. Gurler served as president of the Illinois State Dairy Association and produced over 30,000,000 pounds (14,000,000 kg) of butter in his creameries.

== Biography ==
George Hopkins Gurler was born in Chesterfield, New Hampshire on March 29, 1844. He moved with his family to Keene in 1847 and then to DeKalb, Illinois in 1856. He attended public schools in DeKalb. During the Civil War, Gurler enlisted in the 15th Illinois Volunteer Infantry Regiment. Upon his return after the war, he worked in his brother's store, Flinn & Gurler. Within a year, he bought out the senior partner. The business became known as Gurler Brothers until Henry B. Gurler retired two years later. George Gurler ran the business alone for the next eight years. He then sold the business to Fuller & Hard.

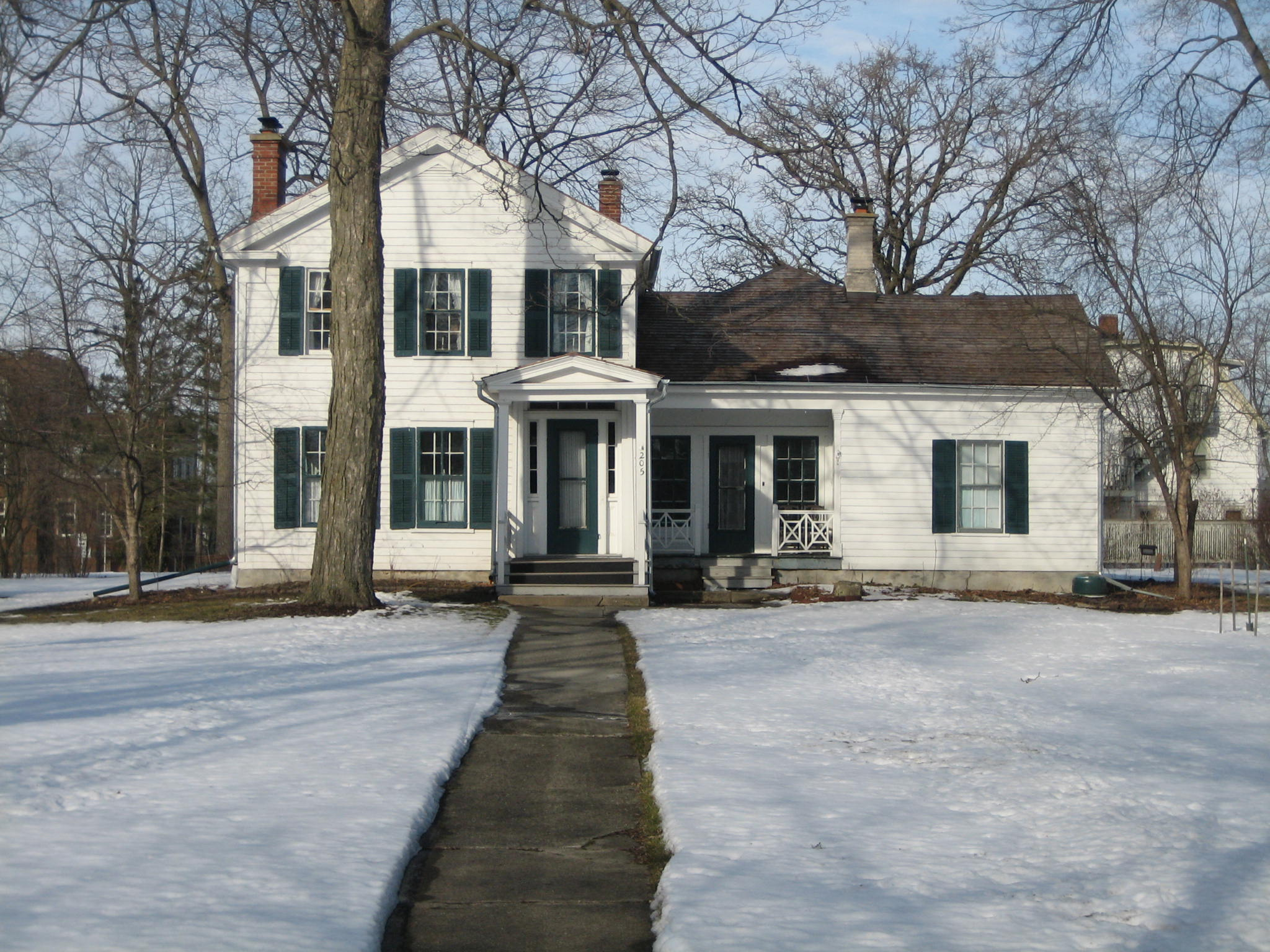
Gurler lived in this 1857 Greek Revival house in DeKalb

Gurler spent the next two years purchasing butter and eggs for a grocery. He then spent four years working in a creamery for Hiram Ellwood. Gurler again join his brother Henry to start their own creamery. As Gurler Brothers & Co., they built a creamery in DeKalb and expanded to own creameries in Hinckley, Shabbona Grove, Shabbona, Lee, and Malta. The partnership ended in 1895, and Gurler took sole possession of the Malta, Shabbona, Shabbona Grove, and Hinkley creameries.

Gurler's son Charles joined him at this point, and together they purchased or built creameries in Creston, Volo, Wauconda, and Griswold Lake. They also expanded their holdings into Iowa, where they acquired creameries in Mason City, Rockwell, Chapin, Alexander, Sheffield, Republic, Nashua, Powersville, Hampton, and Cedar Rapids. The company was incorporated in 1907 as Gurler, Borth Company (later Gurler & Co.).

Gurler served as president of the Illinois State Dairy Association for five years and was vice president of the Elgin Board of Trade. He was also a member of the Grand Army of the Republic and the Independent Order of Odd Fellows. He produced over 30,000,000 pounds (14,000,000 kg) of butter in his creamery enterprises. Gurler was locally renowned for his expansive collection of stuffed animals and birds. He and his family were once owners of the Gurler House, a site listed on the National Register of Historic Places. When he died in 1940, he was DeKalb's last surviving Civil War veteran.
