= Rock Ridge Night Rocket =

Ch. Rock Ridge Night Rocket
- Species: Canis lupus familiaris
- Breed: Bedlington Terrier
- Sex: Male
- Known for: Best In Show at the Westminster Dog Show
- Term: 1948
- Predecessor: Ch. Warlord of Mazelaine
- Successor: Ch. Mazelaine Zazarac Brandy
- Owner: William Rockefeller's Family

Ch. Rock Ridge Night Rocket was a Bedlington Terrier that won best in show at the Westminster Kennel Club Dog Show in 1948. A LIFE magazine article called him the "Best U.S. Dog". He was owned by William Rockefeller's family.
