= Hundley =

Hundley is a surname. Notable people with the surname include:

- Amelia Hundley (born 1998), American gymnast
- Brett Hundley (born 1993), American football quarterback
- Elliott Hundley (born 1975), sculptor
- H. R. Hundley (1867–1934), American college football coach
- Hot Rod Hundley (1934–2015), American basketball player and sportscaster
- John Hundley (1899 - 1990), musical comedy singer, actor and television executive
- John Walker Hundley (1841-1914), Baptist minister
- Nick Hundley (born 1983), baseball catcher
- Randy Hundley (born 1942), American baseball catcher
- Oscar Richard Hundley (1855 – 1921), American judge
- Sterling Hundley (born 1976), illustrator and painter
- Todd Hundley (born 1969), American baseball catcher; son of Randy
- William G. Hundley (1925-2006), American criminal defense attorney

== See also ==
- Hunley
- Huntley (surname)
