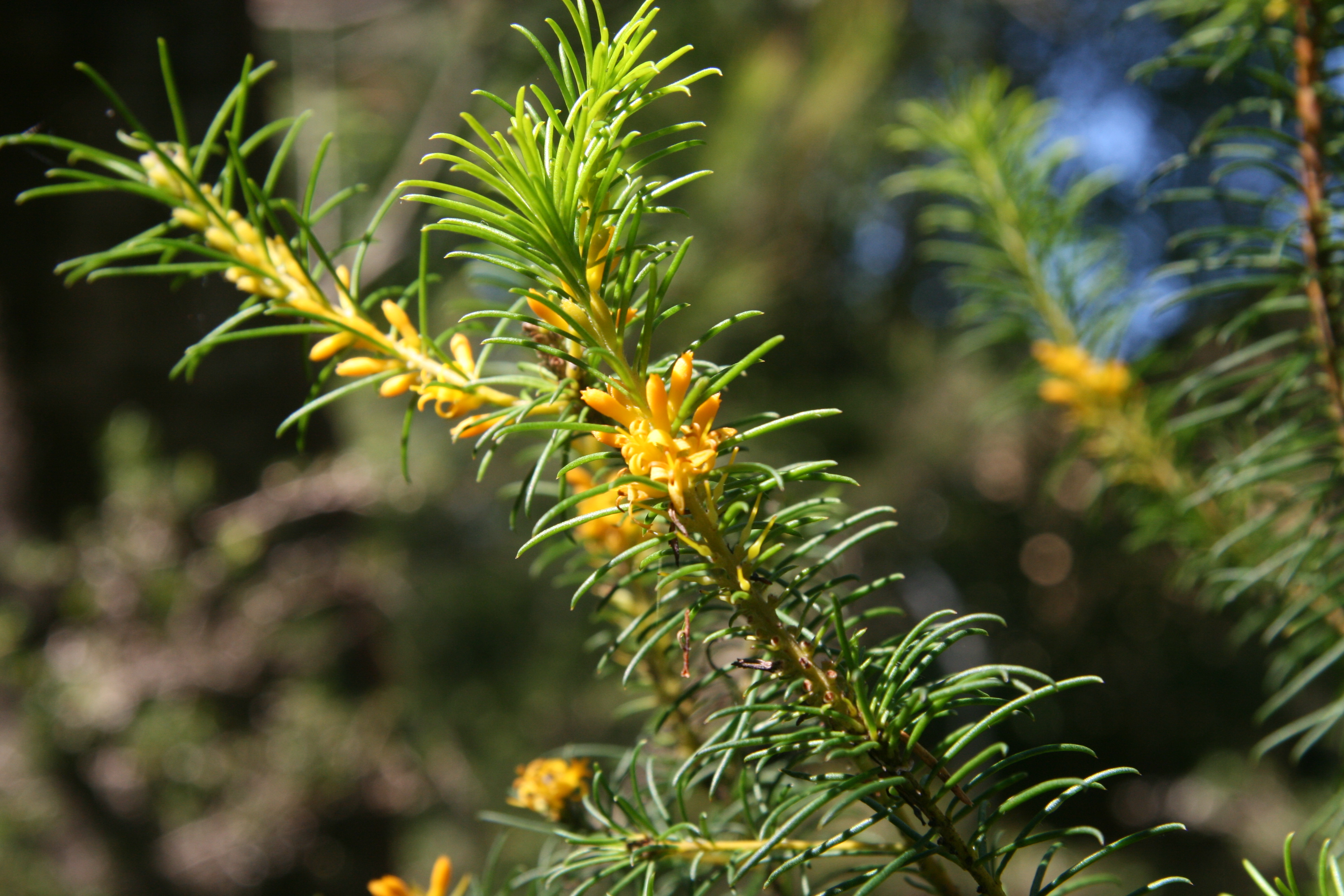
- Persoonia isophylla at the Australian Reptile Park

Scientific classification
- Kingdom: Plantae
- Clade: Tracheophytes
- Clade: Angiosperms
- Clade: Eudicots
- Order: Proteales
- Family: Proteaceae
- Genus: Persoonia
- Species: P. isophylla

Binomial name
- Persoonia isophylla L.A.S.Johnson & P.H.Weston
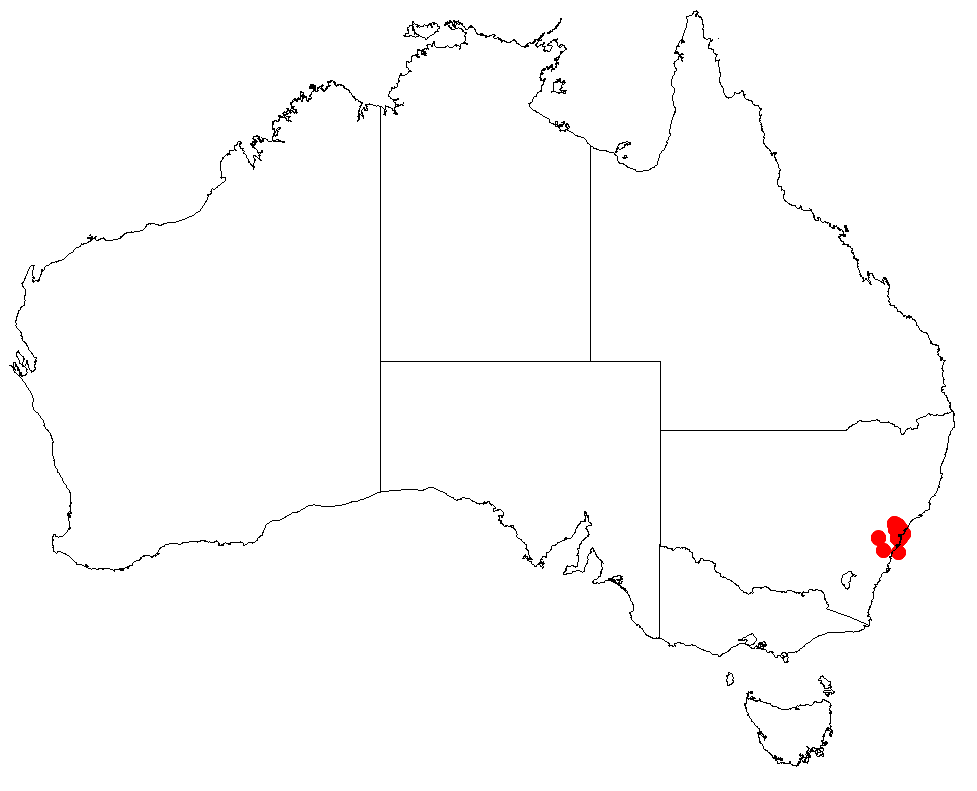
- Occurrence data from Australasian Virtual Herbarium

= Persoonia isophylla =

Species of shrub

Persoonia isophylla is a species of flowering plant in the family Proteaceae. It is endemic to New South Wales, Australia. It is an erect or spreading shrub with soft, pine-like leaves and groups of cylindrical yellow flowers. It is similar to P. pinifolia but the flowers of that species have small leaves at their base, where the flowers of P. isophylla have full-sized leaves at their base. The two species sometimes grow together but hybrids between them are rare.

== Description ==
Persoonia isophylla is an erect or spreading shrub which grows to a height of 0.3–1.5 m (1–5 ft) and has smooth bark. The leaves are arranged alternately and are narrow cylindrical in shape, 12–30 mm (0.5–1 in) long, about 0.5 mm (0.02 in) wide and glabrous when mature. The flowers are arranged in groups of between ten and seventy at the ends of the branches. The groups have a stalk 5–90 mm (0.2–4 in) long, each flower with a pedicel up to 1.5 mm (0.06 in) long. There is a full-sized leaf at the base of the group which continues to grow after flowering. The flower is composed of four yellow glabrous or slightly hairy tepals 7–8 mm (0.28–0.31 in) long, which are fused at the base but with the tips rolled back. The central style is surrounded by four yellow anthers which are also joined at the base with the tips rolled back, so that it resembles a cross when viewed end-on. Flowering occurs from January to July and is followed by fruit which are smooth green drupes usually with reddish-purple blotches.

== Taxonomy and naming ==
Persoonia isophylla was first formally described in 1991 by Peter H. Weston and Lawrie Johnson from a specimen collected at Peats Ridge. The description was published in Telopea. The specific epithet (isophylla) is derived from the Ancient Greek prefix isos meaning "equal" and phyllon meaning "leaf"referring to groups of flowers which have a full-sized leaf at their base.

== Distribution and habitat ==
This persoonia grows in sandy soils derived from Sydney sandstone at altitudes up to 250 m (800 ft) between Gosford and Frenchs Forest.
