= John M. Goodell =

John Moseley Goodell (August 3, 1823, New York state – c. 1877) was an early and prominent citizen of DeKalb, Illinois. A merchant by trade Goodell is generally referred to as one of the earliest settlers of the city of DeKalb. Goodell's home, known as the Goodell House was erected in either 1849 or 1853. The house still stands today.
