= Ian Garland =

South African educationist and farmer

Ian Frederick Garland (20 March 1925 Verulam, KwaZulu-Natal - 3 August 2007 Kloof) was a South African educationist and farmer. He received his schooling at Verulam and Cordwalles Primary Schools and Michaelhouse.

Ian Garland started sugarcane farming at 'Twinstreams' near Mtunzini in October 1945 'where clear water flowed from papyrus swamps and swamp forests'. He became a life member of the Natal Society for the Preservation of Wildlife in 1947 and was chairman when it became the Natal Branch in 1954.
