= Bedlington Terrier =

Breed of small dog

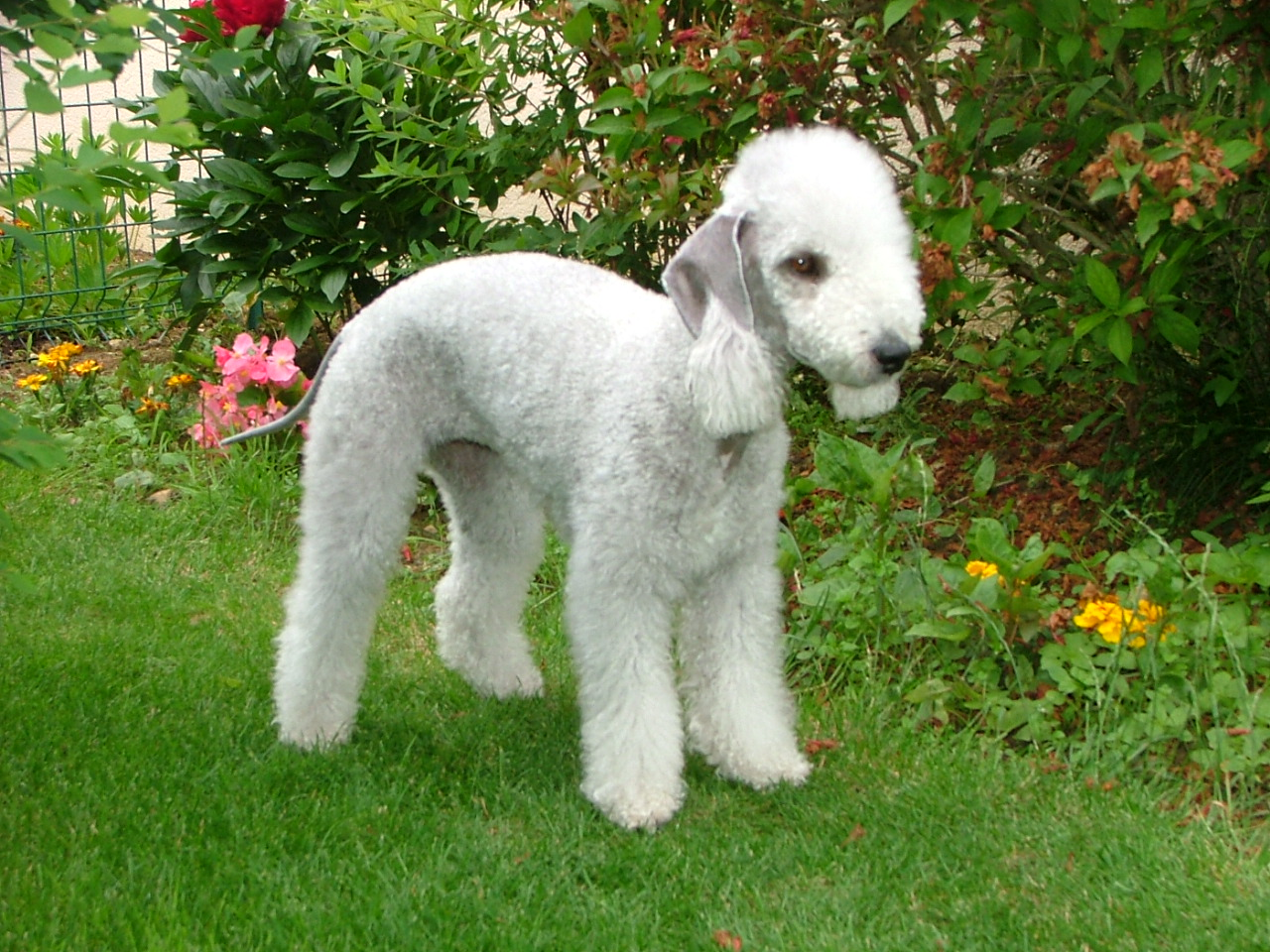
- Other names: Rothbury Terrier; Rodbery Terrier; Rothbury's Lamb
- Origin: England
Traits
| Height | Males | 16.5 inches (42 cm) preferred, 16 to 17.5 inches (41 to 44 cm) acceptable |
| | Females | 15.5 inches (39 cm) preferred, 15 to 16.5 inches (38 to 42 cm) acceptable |
- Weight: 17–23 pounds (7.7–10.4 kg)
- Coat: Curly, 'crisp' in texture with a distinct topknot, nonshedding, minimal odor
- Colour: Blue, liver, or sandy, or any of these with tan points
- Litter size: 3–6
Kennel club standards
- The Kennel Club: standard
- Fédération Cynologique Internationale: standard

The Bedlington Terrier is a breed of small dog named after the mining town of Bedlington, Northumberland in North East England. Originally bred to hunt, the Bedlington Terrier has since been used in dog racing, numerous dog sports, as well as in conformation shows and as a companion dog. It is closely related to the Dandie Dinmont Terrier, Whippet and Otterhound.

It is described as a very versatile yet contradictory dog. They have powerful swimming skills, comparable to those of water dogs such as the Newfoundland, and are noted for being very quick and having high endurance. Bedlingtons are noted for their similarity in appearance to lambs. The dogs have blue, liver or sandy colouration, all three of which may have tan points. Their fur forms a distinctive top knot on the dog's head. It is nonshedding and with minimal odor but needs weekly grooming to remove dead hair.

Originally known as the Rothbury or Rodbury Terrier, the name Bedlington Terrier was not applied to the breed until 1825, but some dogs have pedigrees that can be traced back as far as 1782. The first dog show with a class for Bedlington Terriers was held in 1870 at Bedlington. Bedlington Terriers shown at early shows were frequently dyed to improve the look of their fur. In 1948, a Bedlington Terrier known as Rock Ridge Night Rocket won best in show at the Westminster Kennel Club Dog Show. The breed has a high incidence of copper toxicosis.

== Description ==
=== Appearance ===
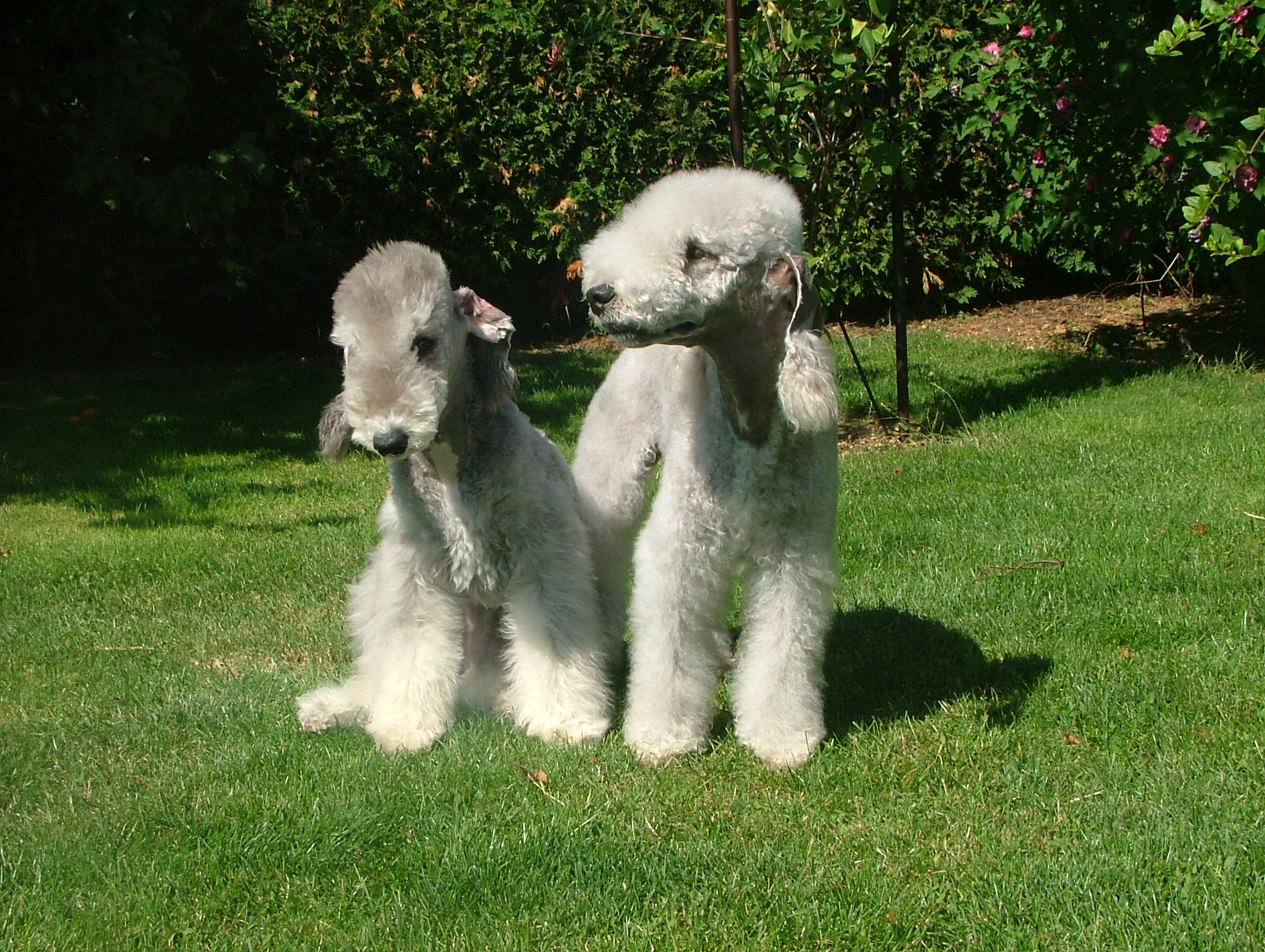
Bedlington Terrier puppies are dark in color, but as they age their fur lightens.

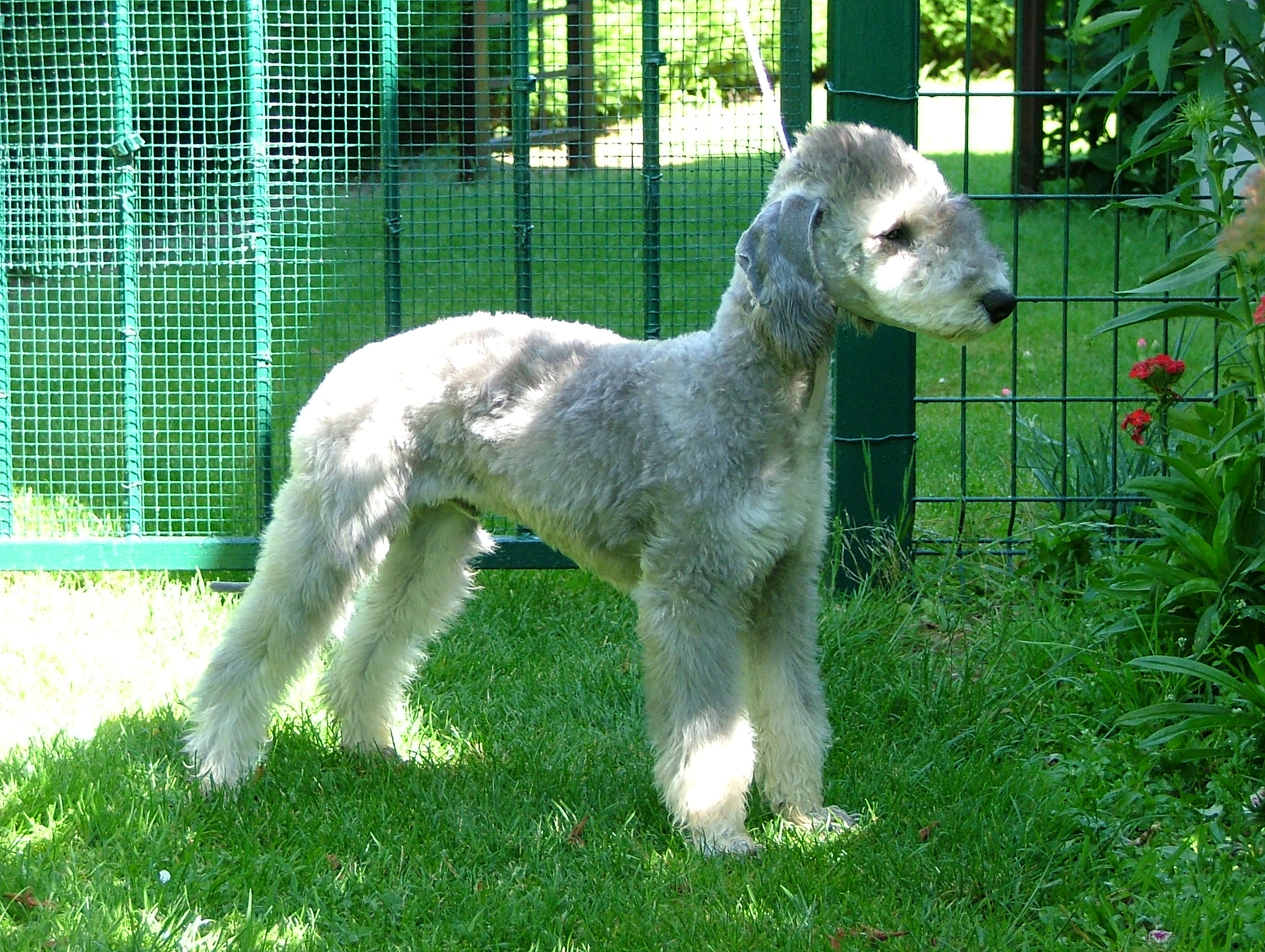
Bedlington Terrier

The Bedlington Terrier has been described as resembling a lamb. It has also been compared to a miniature version of the Scottish Deerhound. George Shields stated that exceedingly well-bred dogs possess the spirit of a thoroughbred racehorse.

The dogs have blue, liver or sandy colouration, all three of which may have tan points. Bedlingtons carry what is known as the greying gene, a dominant trait carried on the G locus. This gene causes puppies born with black or dark brown fur to lighten to grey or liver with age. The fur of the Bedlington creates a shape on the top of the dog's head known as a topknot. Although most modern breed standards call for the dog's topknot to be lighter than its body, when the breed was first being formed there was at least one prominent breeder, Mr. Pickett, who believed that the topknot should be darker, not lighter.

The dog's coat has been described as shaggy, hard, and rugged in style and it has also been described as linty in texture, giving the breed the nickname of "linty-haired terrier". Its coat is made up of a combination of hard and soft hairs. It is extremely difficult to maintain a "show clip", even for professionals, and grooming can be quite expensive. Dogs in what is referred to as show clip, or groomed for the show ring, cannot have fur that stands out more than 1 inch (2.5 centimetres) from their body, and the coat must have a "crisp" texture. If grooming is not performed regularly, the coat's condition rapidly deteriorates. For that reason, most Bedlingtons that are kept strictly as pets keep a lower maintenance "pet groom" style. Bedlington Terriers —like Poodles— have been referred to as a nonshedding, hypoallergenic breed. They have minimal dog odor as long as their coat and ears are healthy and their coat is groomed regularly to remove dead hair. Bedlingtons like the groomer and are cooperative under clip.

The head of the dog must be rounded in shape with no stop. Their eyes are almond-shaped and small, and the lips are close-fitting and lack flews. The back must be arched, and the body should be slightly longer in length than in height. Although 16.5 inches (42 cm) is the preferred height for male dogs, a range from 16 to 17.5 inches (41 to 44 cm) is allowed; for females, the preferred height is 15.5 inches (39 cm) and the acceptable range is from 15 to 16.5 inches (38 to 42 cm). Both genders must weigh between 17 and 23 pounds (7.7 and 10.4 kg). They possess a light, springy gait.

=== Temperament ===
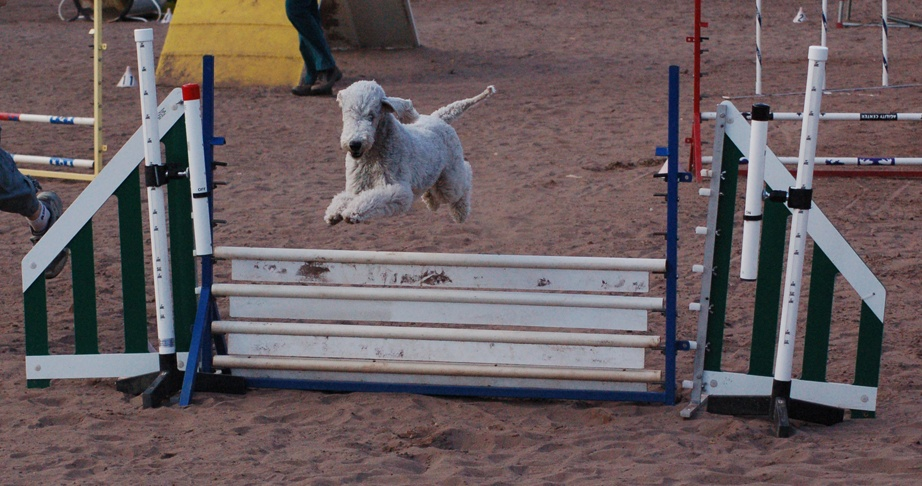
Bedlington Terriers are known for their speed and endurance, traits which makes them candidates for dog agility.

Bedlingtons are sharp and plucky. Their bark has been called hound-like and has been compared to the firing of a machine gun. A fast dog with high endurance, the Bedlington Terrier is just as quick in water as it is on land, and their swimming speed rivals that of the Newfoundland. Bedlington Terriers "have pace enough to keep up with the ordinary speed of a horse." Because of the Whippet in their lineage, they have a tendency to bolt. Their versatility has been praised, with some dogs willing to "[be] a house-dog, a gun-dog, a rat-dog, a badger-dog, or, if needed, [to] bolt a fox..."

They are also known for their intelligence and tenacity when it comes to taking on vermin. Bedlingtons are quite fond of fighting, and are prone to jealousy when around other dogs. One man stated that "this dog was about fit to kill any other dog of his weight". They have also been used in dog fighting.

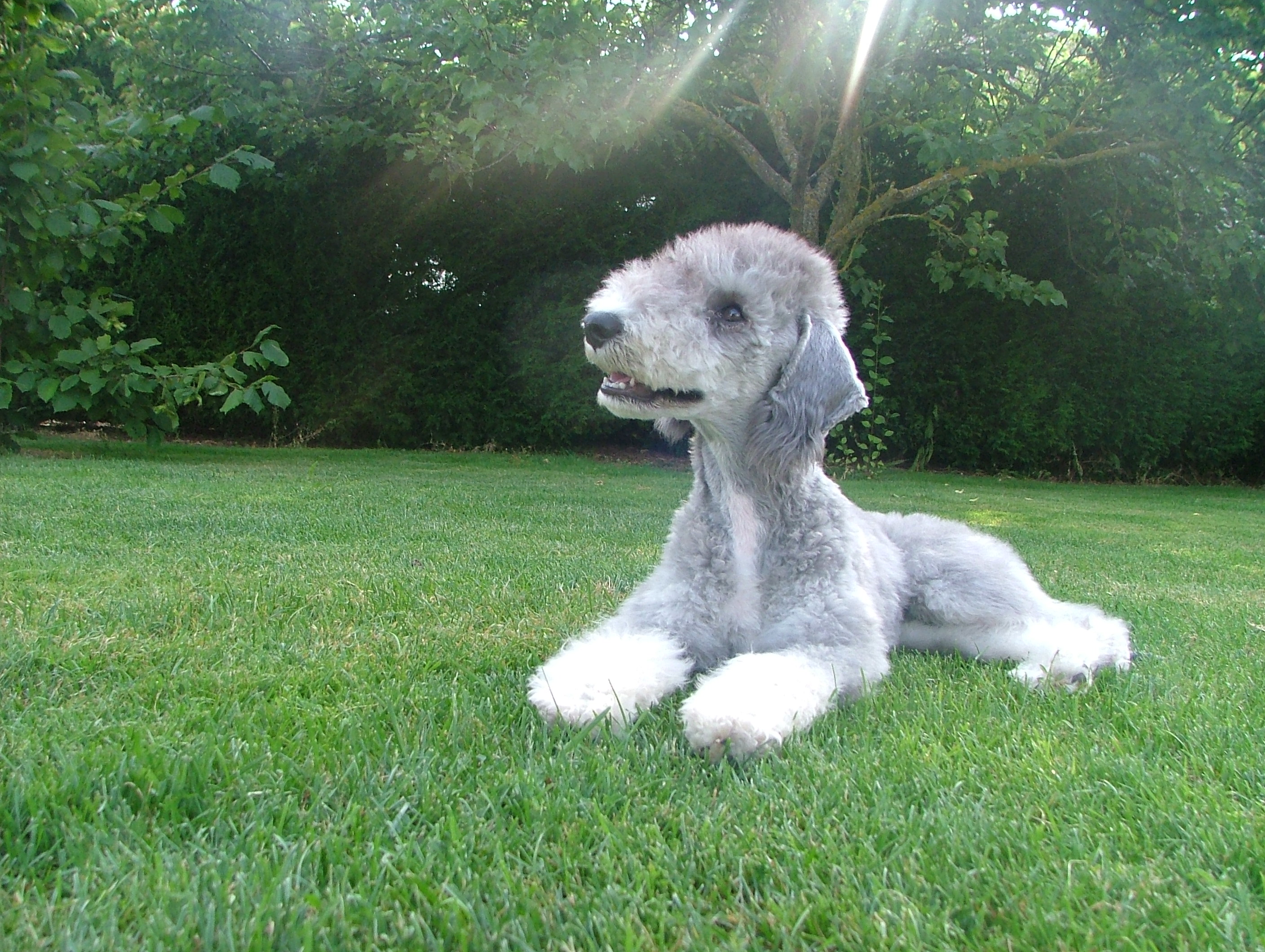
Bedlington Terrier

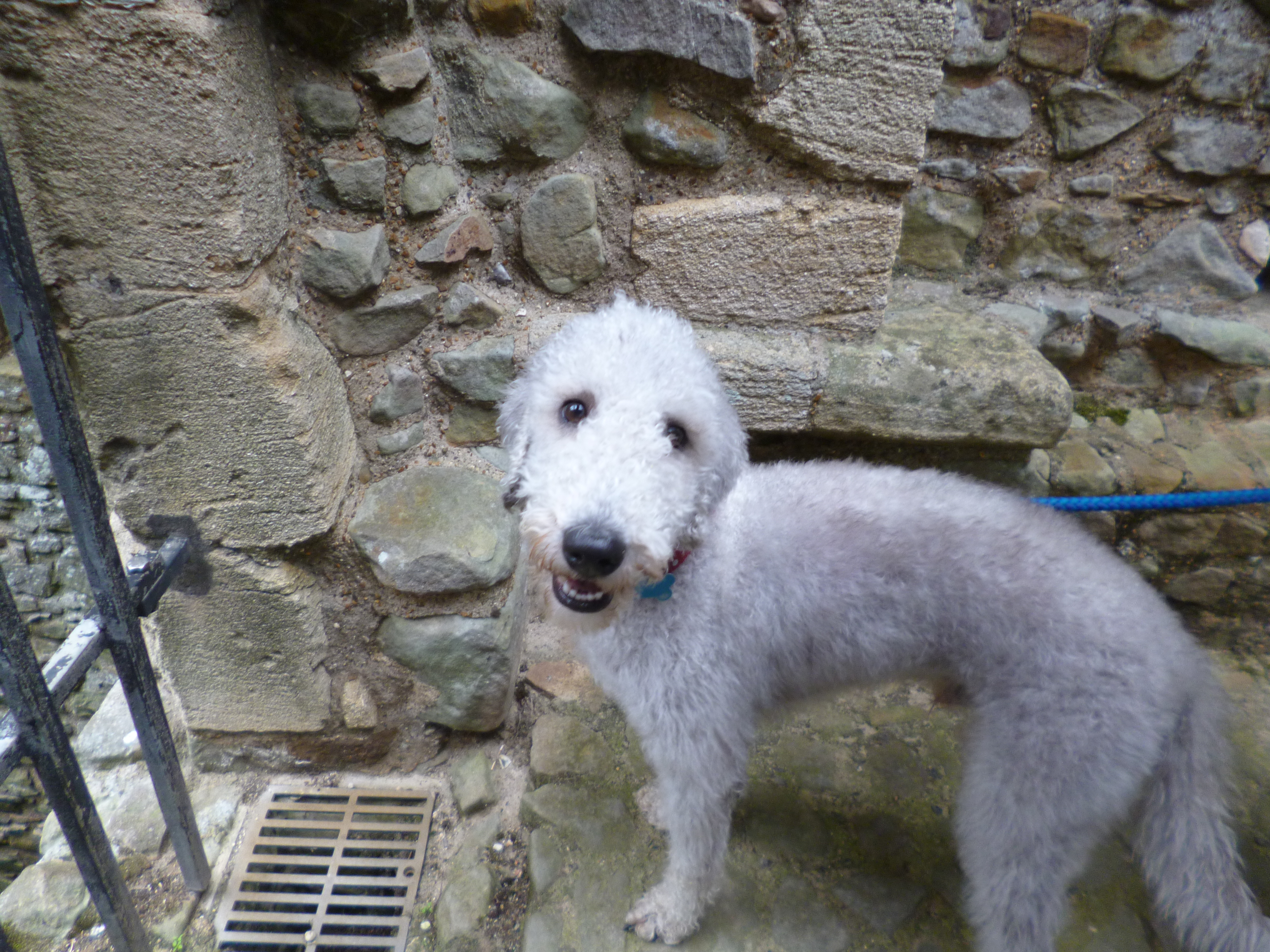
Bedlington Terrier With Pet Clip

However, both the AKC and the ASPCA call the breed "mild" and "gentle" and recommends it as being good with children. PetFinder says the breed is soft in temperament, companionable, demonstrative, loyal, and a quiet house dog. Although the breed may chase small animals outside, it is accepting of them inside. Playful and cheerful, the breed can be high-strung and excitable, and is prone to being headstrong. The New Zealand Kennel Club warns against keeping them with dogs that have dominant personalities, "as once challenged they are terrifying fighters, despite their gentle appearance", but otherwise the breed is good with other dogs.

Some breeders, notably George Newcombe, have argued that the working ability and courage of the Bedlington terrier has declined since it began being bred for show. Poodle may have been introduced into the breed to make the coat easier to groom and maintain. George Newcombe of the Working Bedlington Terrier Club said that "the pure [Bedlington Terrier] could no longer be considered a serious working breed" and proceeded to cross his dogs with Lakeland Terriers in an attempt to bring back the Bedlington's working qualities; the names Lakebed and Bedland have been proposed for the cross.

== History ==
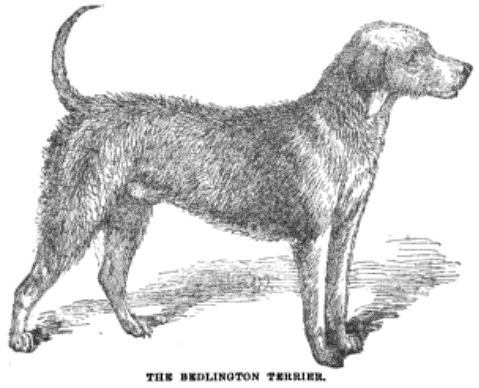
An image of a Bedlington Terrier, c. 1889

Bred in the village of Bedlington in Northumberland, the Bedlington Terrier has been described as "the favourite companion of the northern miners". They were originally known as Rodbury Terriers, Rothbury Terriers, or "Rothbury's Lambs", because the Lord of Rothbury had taken a particular liking to the dogs. Before this, they were known as "gypsy dogs", as the Romani people—called 'Gypsies' in those days—and poachers used them to hunt. The first mention of the Bedlington terrier, or as it was then known, the Rothbury or Rodbury Terrier, was in 1825, most likely in The Life of James Allen, but some dogs' pedigrees have been traced as far back as 1782. James' father, William, was much in demand as an otter hunter, and he kept Bedlington Terriers in order to help him hunt. They were also valued by their owners as rabbit coursing dogs and racing dogs, until the Whippet became more popular as a racing dog and a courser.

The Bedlington Terrier name was first given to a dog named Young Piper, which was owned by a man named Joseph Ainsley. Ainsley's Piper has been called "the best of his race" and "had a reputation for great pluck and courage". Piper began working with badgers at eight months old, and carried on hunting other animals generally regarded as vermin until he was blind. Piper is also known for saving a child from a pig, keeping the animal at bay until help arrived. Piper died at fifteen.

A Bedlington's plucky nature was also often its downfall. Many a dog was killed or put down after hunting badgers. A good hunting dog knew to keep its distance from the badger until the huntsmen arrived. Younger or inexperienced terriers would attack the badger, usually with horrific consequences. Limb amputations or lower jaws ripped off by the more powerful badger were common.

The first shows that had a class for the Bedlington Terrier were held in 1870 at Bedlington. The following year there was a Bedlington Terrier class at a show held at Crystal Palace, where a red dog named Miner took first prize. Miner also won a show held in Birmingham. The Bedlington Terrier Club was established in 1875. Many dogs in early shows were clipped and dyed to bring them closer to the breed standard and improve their chances of winning.

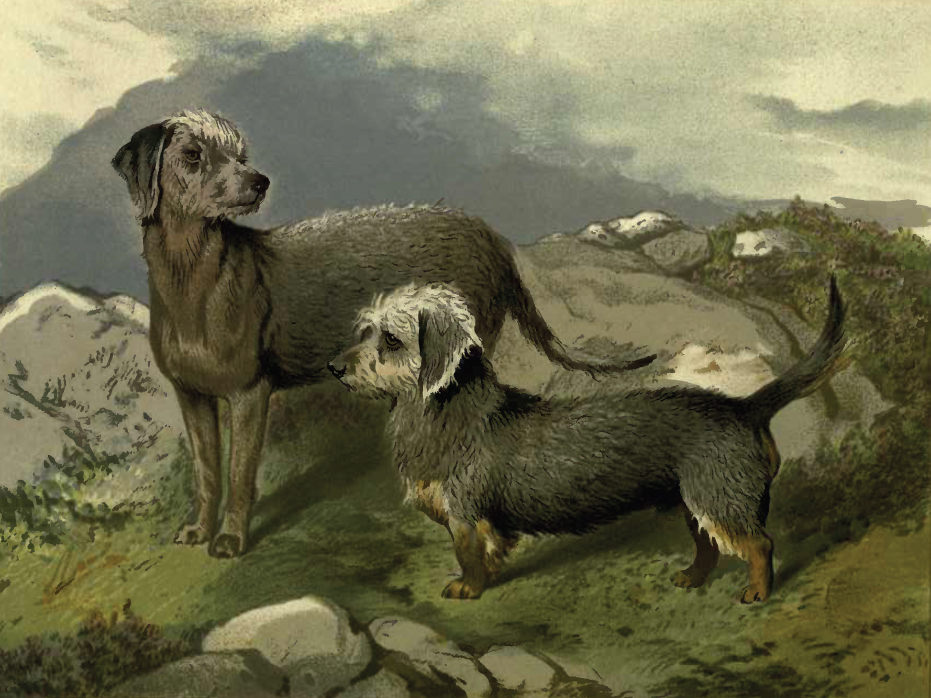
A painting of a Bedlington Terrier (left) and a Dandie Dinmont Terrier, circa 1881.

It is unknown if the judges of the time were aware of this practice, or if they cared. The practice of trimming was eventually accepted by The Kennel Club under the pretense that the trimming was being done to "smarten a dog to show his shape and general contour."

Bedlington Terriers are closely related to the Dandie Dinmont Terrier. In fact the Earl of Antrim once exhibited two terriers from the same litter, and one won shows as a Dandie Dinmont, while the other won shows as a Bedlington. Bedlington Terriers are also related to the Kerry Blue Terrier and the Soft Coated Wheaten Terrier. The shape of its back suggests that it may be related to the Whippet and it may also be related to the otterhound. Bedlington Terriers have been crossed with Whippets to produce a Lurcher with "extra guts, pep, [and] fire."

In 1948 Ch. Rock Ridge Night Rocket took best in show at the Westminster Kennel Club Dog Show and was subsequently featured in Life magazine. One of his descendants, Ch. Femars' Cable Car, was featured on the cover of Sports Illustrated in the February 8, 1960 edition.

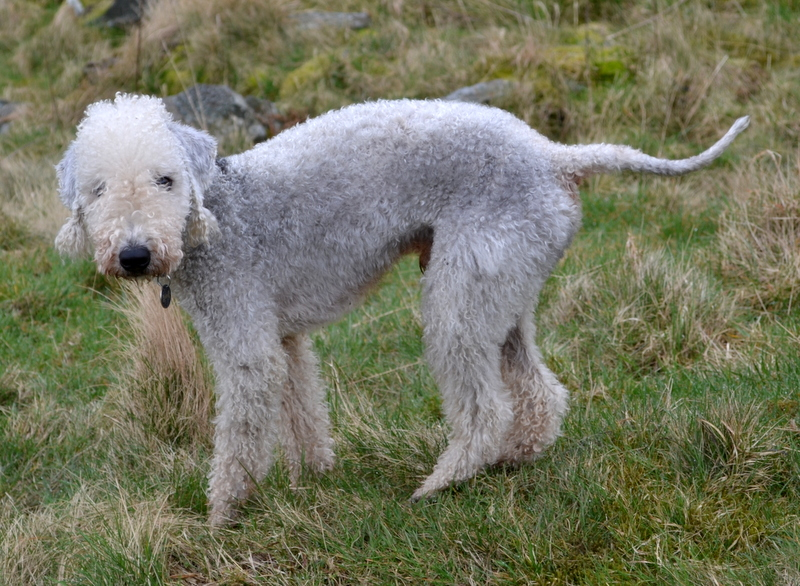
Bedlington Terrier

== Health ==
=== Longevity ===
A 2024 UK study found a life expectancy of 13.7 years for the breed compared to an average of 12.7 for purebreeds and 12 for crossbreeds.

Leading causes of death among Bedlington Terriers in a 2004 UK survey were old age (23%), urologic (15%) and hepatic (12.5%). The leading hepatic cause of death was copper toxicosis. Dogs that died of liver diseases usually died at a younger age than dogs dying of most other causes.

Bedlington Terrier owners in the UK reported that the most common health issues among living dogs were reproductive, heart murmur and eye problems such as epiphora, retinal dysplasia and cataracts. Bedlingtons seem to be more prone to these eye diseases than other breeds. They also have a high incidence of kidney problems. Copper toxicosis occurred among about 5% of living dogs. Inbreeding is a concern, since some dogs "[having] been bred in and into a damaging extent." Reputable breeders will conduct DNA testing of all litters and will not allow pups that carry the copper toxicosis gene to be bred, a practice that has significantly reduced the incidence of this disease in the breed. Excepting these problems, Bedlingtons are generally a very healthy breed.

=== Copper toxicosis ===
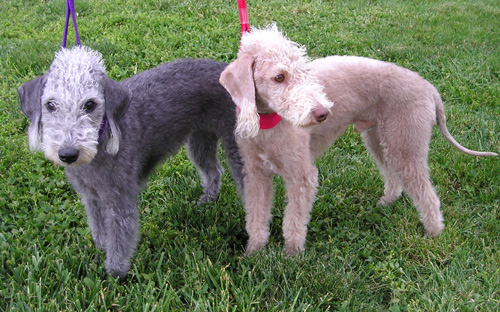
Two Bedlington Terriers, gray and liver-colored, fading to white at its points.

Copper toxicosis, also known as copper storage disease and copper overload syndrome, is an autosomal recessive disease that is characterized by an accumulation of copper in the liver. It is closely related to Wilson's disease in humans. Bedlington Terriers are more prone to copper toxicosis than most other dog breeds. West Highland White Terriers, Skye Terriers, and Doberman Pinschers are also prone to copper storage disease. Bedlington Terriers are the only breed out of these dogs in which haemolysis has been reported, but there have been no reports of neurological involvement in any dog breed.

Studies have shown that in Bedlingtons, the disease is caused by a defective metallothionein that causes cell lysosomes to become saturated with copper. This causes the cell to store copper in the nucleus. There are three varieties of the disease: the asymptomatic form occurs when copper accumulates but there are no clinical symptoms of the disorder; the fulminating form which is seen mostly in young dogs, causes death in two to three days, and is thought to be caused by stress; and the chronic form, which is characterized by an extended period of time in which liver disease slowly causes the death of the dog. Bedlingtons also have a tendency to accumulate iron in the liver, but not nearly to the extent that they accumulate copper.

== In art ==
Bedlington terriers feature in the paintings of Craigie Aitchison, particularly his crucifixions.

In the 2022 film Sisu, a Bedlington terrier was the faithful companion of the protagonist, a Finnish miner and prospector.
