= Scientific and Technical Advisory Panel =

The Scientific and Technical Advisory Panel (STAP) is an independent advisory body established by the United Nations Global Environment Facility (GEF) in 1995. Seven expert advisers provide the GEF with up to date, authoritative and globally representative science in the areas of biological diversity, climate change, desertification and persistent organic pollutants.

== Structure ==
The Scientific and Technical Advisory Panel falls under the larger UN family of organizations. The UN Environment Program (UNEP) provides STAP with its Secretariat and acts as its liaison to the GEF.

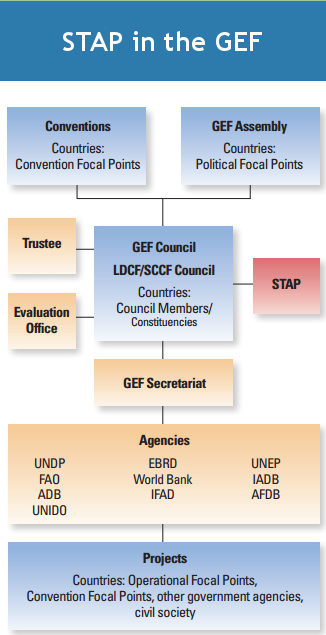

=== Membership ===
The selection criteria require that the composition of the STAP Panel reflect the following,

- Recognized leadership in specific relevant fields in the GEF focal areas of biodiversity/biosafety, climate change, land degradation, international waters and persistent organic pollutants (POPs), with an ability to bridge scientific, technological, economic, social and policy issues.
- Balance between relevant scientific disciplines including natural and social science.
- Geographical and gender balance.
- Experience in the management of science and with knowledge of issues in the implementation of complex international initiatives.
- An understanding of the organizational and operational settings of the GEF and of the implementing agencies, particularly the context of programme and project development and implementation.
- Knowledge about the scientific process required for the implementation of relevant Conventions in developing countries and familiarity with relevant international assessments.

== STAP's Mandate ==
- Provide objective, strategic scientific and technical advice on GEF policies, operational strategies, programs and on projects and programmatic approaches.
- Interact in a complementary manner with other relevant scientific and technical bodies, particularly with the subsidiary bodies of the UN Convention on Biological Diversity, the UN Framework Convention on Climate Change, the Convention to Combat Desertification and the Stockholm Convention on Persistent Organic Pollutants.
- Provide scientific and technical advice on priorities for GEF funding, for focal areas in which the GEF is not operating as a convention’s financial mechanism.
- Provide expert scientific advice to inter-agency task forces and bodies handling other GEF processes, when such advice is requested.
- Operational management of the Least Developed Countries Fund (LDCF) and the Special Climate Change Fund (SCCF) of the United Nations Framework Convention on Climate Change (UNFCCC).
- Review the scientific rationale and technical validity of all LDCF/SCCF full size projects in the context of climate change impacts, vulnerability and adaptation;
- Provide strategic advice on LDCF/SCCF strategies and policies as required;
- Advise on project or program development on a selective basis at the invitation of Agencies;
- Help design and implement approaches to test the Adaptation Learning Objectives; and work with the Secretariat and Agencies to undertake analysis of at least one of these per year;
- Assist in developing impact and vulnerability profiles for global environmental benefits that can be applied across all three trust funds; and
- Assist in further refining and increasing the precision of the Adaptation Monitoring and Assessment Tool.

=== Advice to the GEF Council and to project proponents ===
The STAP Chair reports to every GEF Council meeting, briefing Council members on the Panel’s work and emerging scientific and technical issues.

Advice to Council can include review and/or coauthorship of GEF Policy papers, where there are significant scientific or technical issues, for example:

- Methods for calculating resource allocations (the “STAR”)
- Policies for the use of “set-aside” funds.

Since the fourth replenishment of the GEF Trust Fund, the Panel contributed to the development of focal area strategies for GEF investments, by

- Convening international expert workshops;
- Providing written submissions; and
- Participating in the Technical Advisory Groups that drafted the strategies.

In the GEF Project Cycle, STAP focuses on providing advice on scientific and technical matters to the GEF with a focus on global environment benefits. This advice includes the following:

- Screening all full size project concepts and selected medium-sized project concepts for scientific and technical coherence;
- Advising on program and project development on a selective basis; and
- Identifying priority topics to be addressed by GEF Targeted Research.

== STAP’s work ==
STAP develops advisory documents on projects supported by GEF funding.

== Focus areas ==
- Biodiversity & Biosafety
- Land Degradation
- International Waters
- Climate Change
- Persistent Organic Pollutant (POP)
- Ozone
