= Keith Huntley =

Welsh footballer

Personal information
- Full name: Keith Stanley Murray Huntley
- Date of birth: 12 February 1931
- Place of birth: Swansea, Wales
- Date of death: December 1995 (aged 64)
- Place of death: Swansea, Wales
- Position: Outside left

Senior career*
Years	Team	Apps	(Gls)
–1950	St Jude's		
1950	Swansea Town	2	(0)

International career
1951	Wales Amateurs	2	(1)
- * Club domestic league appearances and goals

Keith Stanley Murray Huntley (12 February 1931 – December 1995) was a Welsh amateur footballer who played in the Football League for Swansea Town as an outside left. He was capped by Wales at amateur level.
