= Francis Huntley =

- Born: 1787?
- Died: 1831
- Known for: Acting
- Height: 5 ft 10 in (178 cm)

Francis Huntley (1787?–1831) was an English actor.

== Life ==
Huntley was born in Barnsley, Yorkshire. He lost his father while young. After some practice in London as an amateur, he began his professional career at Brecknock about 1806. A bad start was made, and he appeared with no more success at the Lyceum. At the Richmond Theatre, he remained for some time, studying and rising in his profession. After performing at Stamford and Nottingham, he played Othello to the Iago of Carey, otherwise Kean, at the Birmingham Theatre. Under Ryley at Bolton he was seen by Elliston, who engaged him for Manchester, and brought him subsequently to the Olympic and to the Surrey, where in the summer of 1809 he appeared as Lockit in the 'Beggar's Opera' to Elliston's Macheath.

In 1811, as King James in the 'Knight of Snowdoun' an operatic adaptation by Morton of the 'Lady of the Lake' he was seen for the first time at Covent Garden. Romaldi in the 'Tale of Mystery' followed on the 27th, and on 11 Dec Wilford in The Iron Chest. On 31 January 1812 he was the original Don Alonzo in Reynolds's 'Virgin of the Sun.' At Easter he returned to the Surrey, and went thence to Dublin, where during two seasons he played leading business at the Smock Alley Theatre. After this he was seen at the Olympic, again with Dibdin at the Surrey, at the Coburg, the Royalty, the West London where he opened as Œdipus to the Jocasta of Mrs. Julia Glover at Astley's, and then again at the Coburg and the Surrey. In his later years he was known as the 'Roscius of the Coburg,' at which house he was principally seen.

Huntley was a well-built man, about 5 ft. 10 in. in height, dark, with an expressive face, great command of feature, and a clear and powerful voice, the undertones of which had much sweetness. Before ruining himself by drunkenness and other irregularities of life, and by playing to vulgar audiences, he had great powers of expressing rage, fear, despair, and other strong passions. He was seen to advantage in Tom Jones, Edward the Black Prince, Fazio, Lockit, George Barnwell, and the Vicar of Wakefield. A portrait of him as Balfour of Burley is given in Oxberry's 'Dramatic Biography,' new series, vol. i. His death was hastened by intemperance. Oxberry (Dramatic Chronology) doubtfully says he was born in 1785, died in 1823, and was buried in Walworth. When at the Surrey with Honeyman the lessee, who was also a publican, his terms are said to have been a guinea a night and as much brandy as he could drink. He married about 1808, but separated from his wife, by whom he had a child. Another Frank Huntley, who was subsequently on the stage, may have been his son.
