= John Huntley (footballer) =

English footballer

Personal information
- Full name: John Huntley
- Date of birth: 5 November 1967
- Place of birth: Great Lumley, County Durham, England
- Position: Defender

Senior career*
Years	Team	Apps	(Gls)
–	Chester-le-Street Town		
1985–1986	Darlington	6	(0)
- * Club domestic league appearances and goals

John Huntley (born 5 November 1967) is an English former footballer who played as a defender in the Football League for Darlington and in non-league football for Chester-le-Street Town.

Huntley made his Darlington debut as a 17-year-old, in the starting eleven for the visit to York City in the Third Division on 5 October 1985; York won 7–0. He played in five more league matches spread out over the season, four of which were in the starting eleven, and also made one start in the League Cup and one substitute appearance in the Associate Members' Cup.
