= Lewis Huntley =

Lewis Huntley (1816-1862), along with his older brother Russell Huntley (born 1807), founded the Illinois city of DeKalb. The pair owned most of the land that would become DeKalb. County surveyor Daniel W. Lamb platted two sections of DeKalb township as a new village in November 1853, a village originally known as Huntley's Grove. Huntley gave the Galena and Chicago Union Railroad (later the Chicago and North Western Railway) right-of-way across his land and a site for a depot. Other railroad investors received also land for speculative purposes. Huntley co-owned the Gurler House in DeKalb with his brother Russell as well. Huntley lost his wife and three children to diphtheria in 1869.
