= Wade Huntley =

American activist

Wade Huntley is an American activist. He graduated from the University of California, Berkeley, in 1993. He has taught and written about international relations theory and nuclear disarmament. He was an associate professor at the Hiroshima Peace Institute in Hiroshima, Japan. He was the Program Director at the Simons Centre for Disarmament and Non-Proliferation Research, based within the Liu Institute for Global Studies, University of British Columbia, Vancouver, British Columbia, Canada. He is currently on the faculty of the U.S. Naval Postgraduate School in Monterey, California.

Huntley specializes in the North Korean nuclear crisis, and is frequently quoted in the mainstream media as an expert on the subject. He has also spoken as part of the US Navy's Regional Security Education Program.
