= Rothbury riot =

1929 Australian civil disorder

- Date: 16 December 1929
- Location: Rothbury Colliery; 32.68024°S 151.34545°E

Casualties
- Deaths: 1

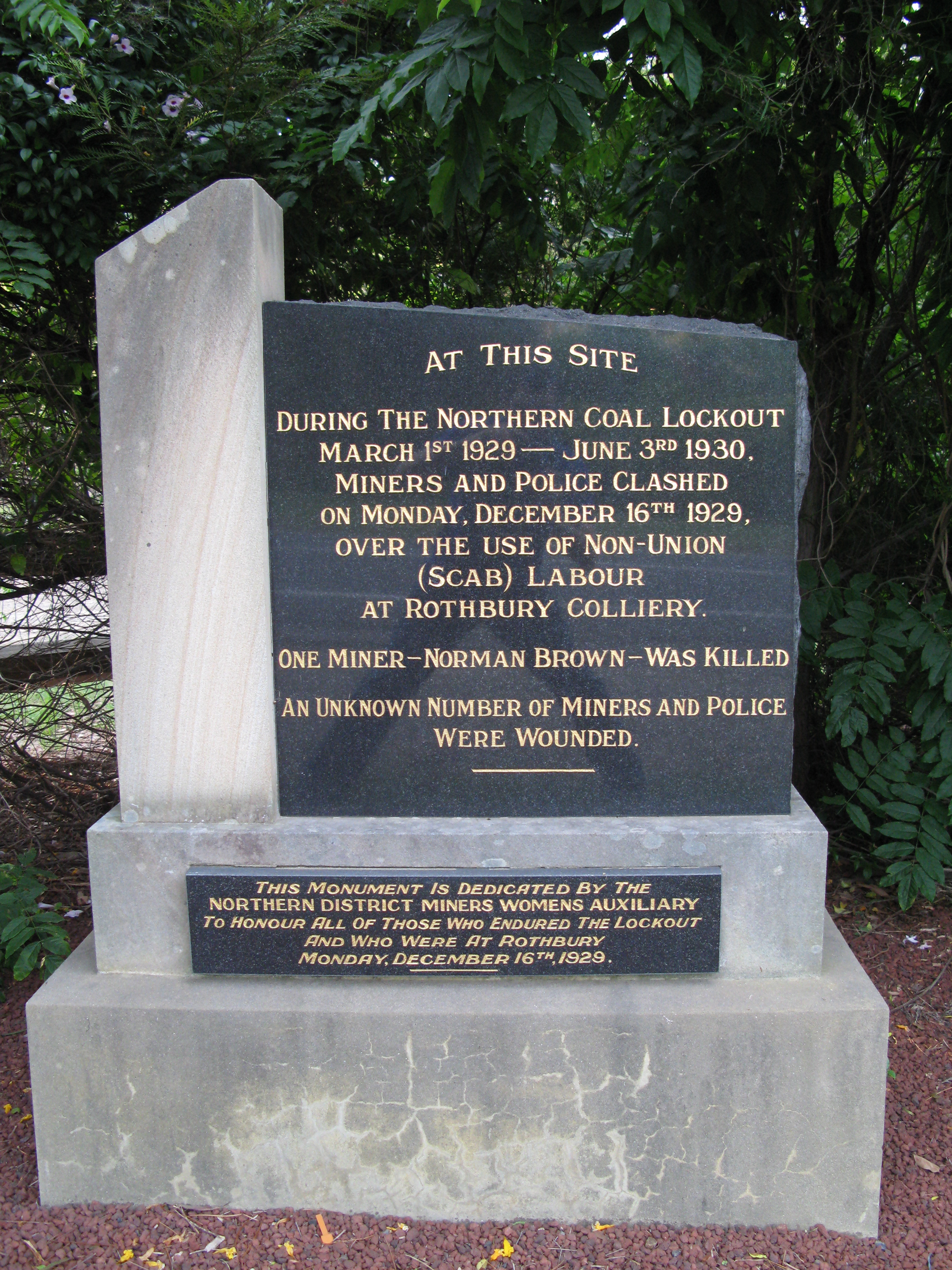
The Rothbury riot memorial

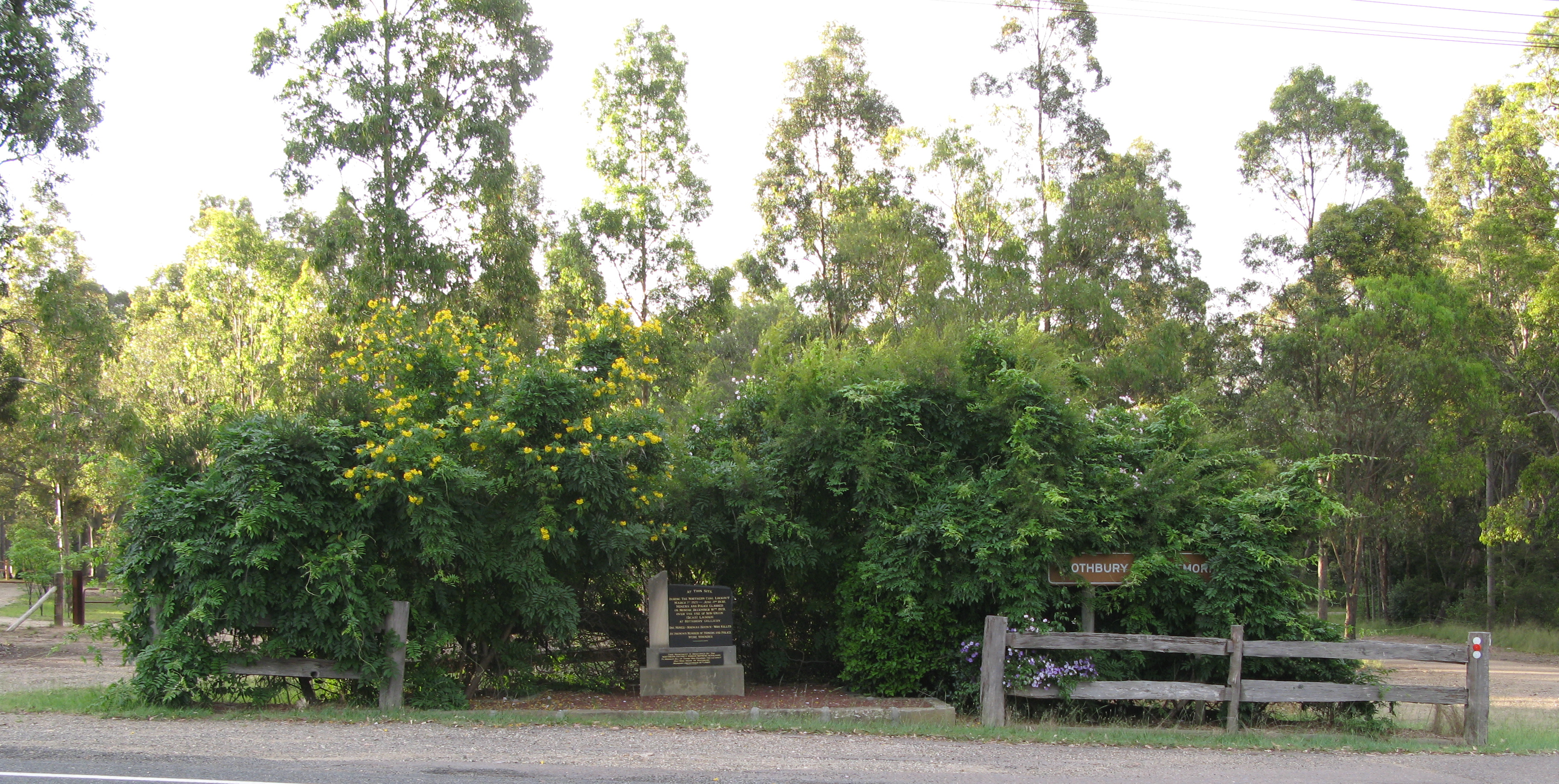
Rothbury riot memorial

On 16 December 1929 New South Wales Police drew their revolvers and shot into a crowd of locked-out miners in the New South Wales town of Rothbury in Australia, killing a 29-year-old miner, Norman Brown, and injuring approximately forty-five miners. The incident became known as the Rothbury affair or the Rothbury riot, and is described as the "bloodiest event in national industrial history."

In 1929, colliery owners on the Northern New South Wales coalfields combined as the Northern Collieries Association. On 14 February 1929 the mine employers gave their 9,750 employees a 14 days' notice, that the miners should accept the following new conditions:

A wage reduction of 12½ per cent on the contract rates, one shilling ($0.10) a day on the "day wage" rate; all Lodges must give the colliery managers the right to hire and fire without regard to seniority; all Lodges must agree to discontinue pit-top meetings and pit stoppages.

The miners refused to accept these terms, and on 2 March 1929 all miners were "locked out" of their employment.

In September 1929, the NSW State Parliament introduced an Unlawful Assembly Act designed to suppress the miners, which authorised police to break up any gatherings.

On 16 December 1929 about 5,000 miners demonstrated against the introduction of non-union labour into the Rothbury mine by the conservative Bavin government, which had taken over the colliery. The government called in 70 New South Wales police officers from districts outside Newcastle to protect the colliery and allow the entry of non-union labour. Angry miners marched to the mine gate led by a pipe band. When they charged the gate bearing clubs and firearms, the miners were met with defensive baton blows by the police and there were hand-to-hand clashes. Three shots had been fired at the police, followed by the order for law enforcement to draw their revolvers and fire a volley of shots over the heads of the rioters and at the ground. One miner, Norman Brown, received a fatal wound from a ricocheting bullet. The youngest miner was 15-year-old Joseph Cummings, who risked his life, dodging bullets as he ran for the doctor, in a futile effort to help save Brown's life.

The Sydney Daily Telegraph Pictorial described the event as "the most dramatic industrial clash that has ever shocked Australia."

In June 1930, after fifteen months of living in poverty and starvation, the miners capitulated and returned to work on reduced contract wages. However, the lockout failed to break the resolve or organization of the miners union.

The Rothbury mine finally closed in 1974. A monument in honour of Norman Brown is located at North Rothbury. The site is now a railway workshop, restoring locomotives and rollingstock used on railways in the local coalfields.

The 1957 poem "The Ballad of Norman Brown" by Dorothy Hewett, has become one of Australia's most strident union songs, under several different tunes. Other songs about the event include "A sad day on the coalfields" (1929), "And the country knows the rest" (1975) and "Rothbury" (1984).
