= John Huntley (cricketer) =

Australian-born New Zealand cricketer

Herbert John Huntley (4 November 1883 – 28 March 1944) was an Australian-born cricketer who played in New Zealand for Otago during the 1912–13 season.

Huntley was born at the Melbourne suburb of Brighton in 1883 and lived for a time at Creswick in the state. He moved to New Zealand and was a farm manager at Ettrick in Central Otago.

Living for a time at Invercargill in the early years of the 20th century, Huntley was a member of Invercargill Cricket Club and played representative cricket for Southland. During the 1912–13 season he played for Otago against South Melbourne Cricket Club and Southland, taking four wickets in each match, before making his only first-class appearance in March 1913. Against Canterbury he scored a total of 15 runs and did not take a wicket in the match.

Huntley died at Tuapeka in Otago in 1944. He was aged 60.
