= Russell Huntley =

Russell Huntley (born 1807), along with his younger brother Lewis Huntley (1816-1862), founded the Illinois city of DeKalb. The pair owned most of the land that would become DeKalb. County surveyor Daniel W. Lamb platted two sections of DeKalb township as a new village in November 1853, a village originally known as Huntley's Grove. Huntley gave the Galena and Chicago Union Railroad (later the Chicago and North Western Railway) right-of-way across his land and a site for a depot. Other railroad investors also received land for speculative purposes.
