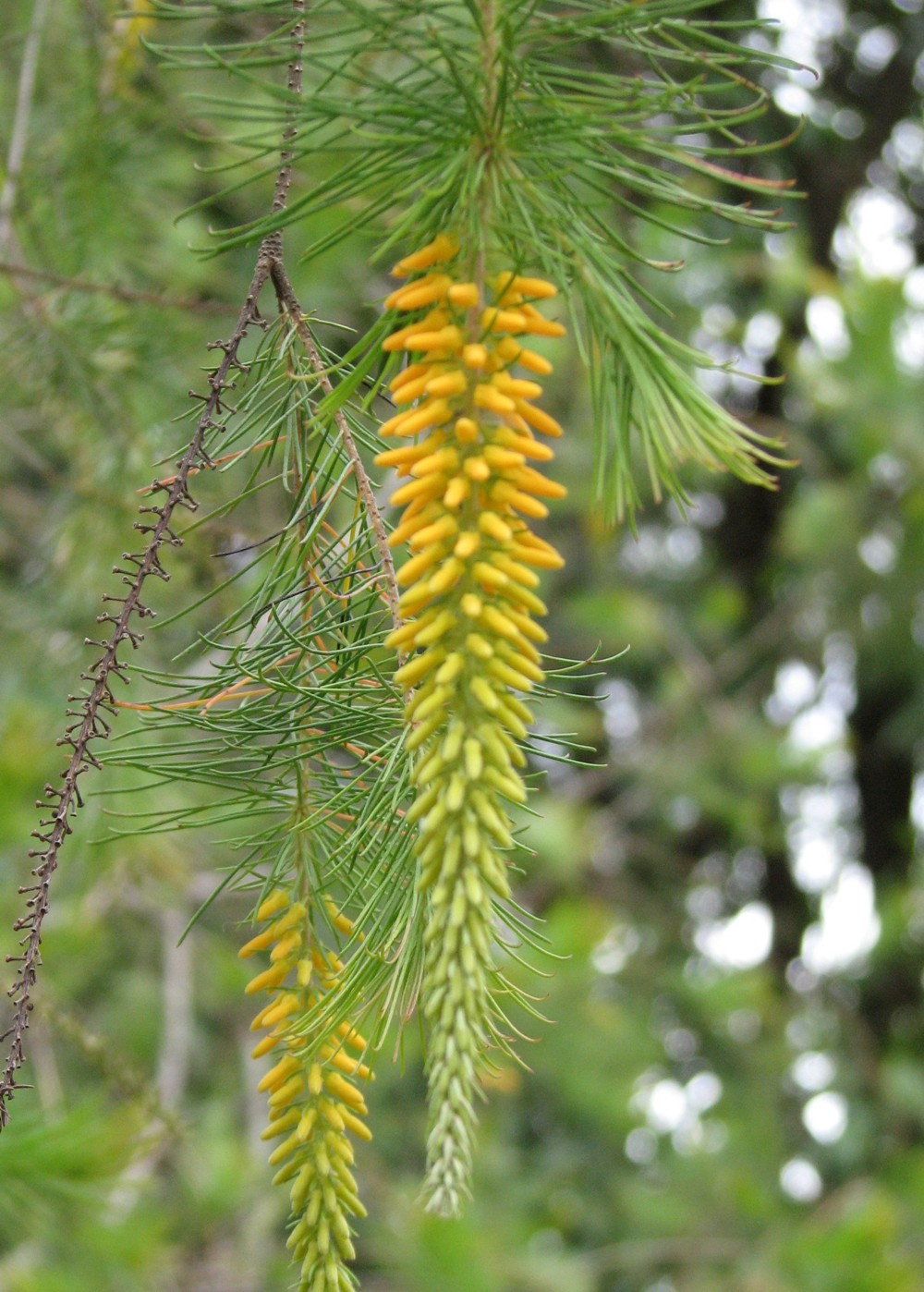
- Persoonia pinifolia in Maranoa Botanic Gardens

Conservation status
- Least Concern (IUCN 3.1)

Scientific classification
- Kingdom: Plantae
- Clade: Tracheophytes
- Clade: Angiosperms
- Clade: Eudicots
- Order: Proteales
- Family: Proteaceae
- Genus: Persoonia
- Species: P. pinifolia

Binomial name
- Persoonia pinifolia R.Br.

Synonyms
- Linkia pinifolia (R.Br.) Kuntze; Persoonia pervagans Gand. Persoonia patulifolia Gand.

= Persoonia pinifolia =

Pine-leaved geebung

Species of flowering plant

Persoonia pinifolia, commonly known as pine-leaved geebung or as mambara in the Cadigal language, is a species of flowering plant in the family Proteaceae and is endemic to the Sydney region of New South Wales. It is an upright, woody shrub with soft, pine-like foliage and long, terminal racemes of small yellow flowers in late winter to summer.

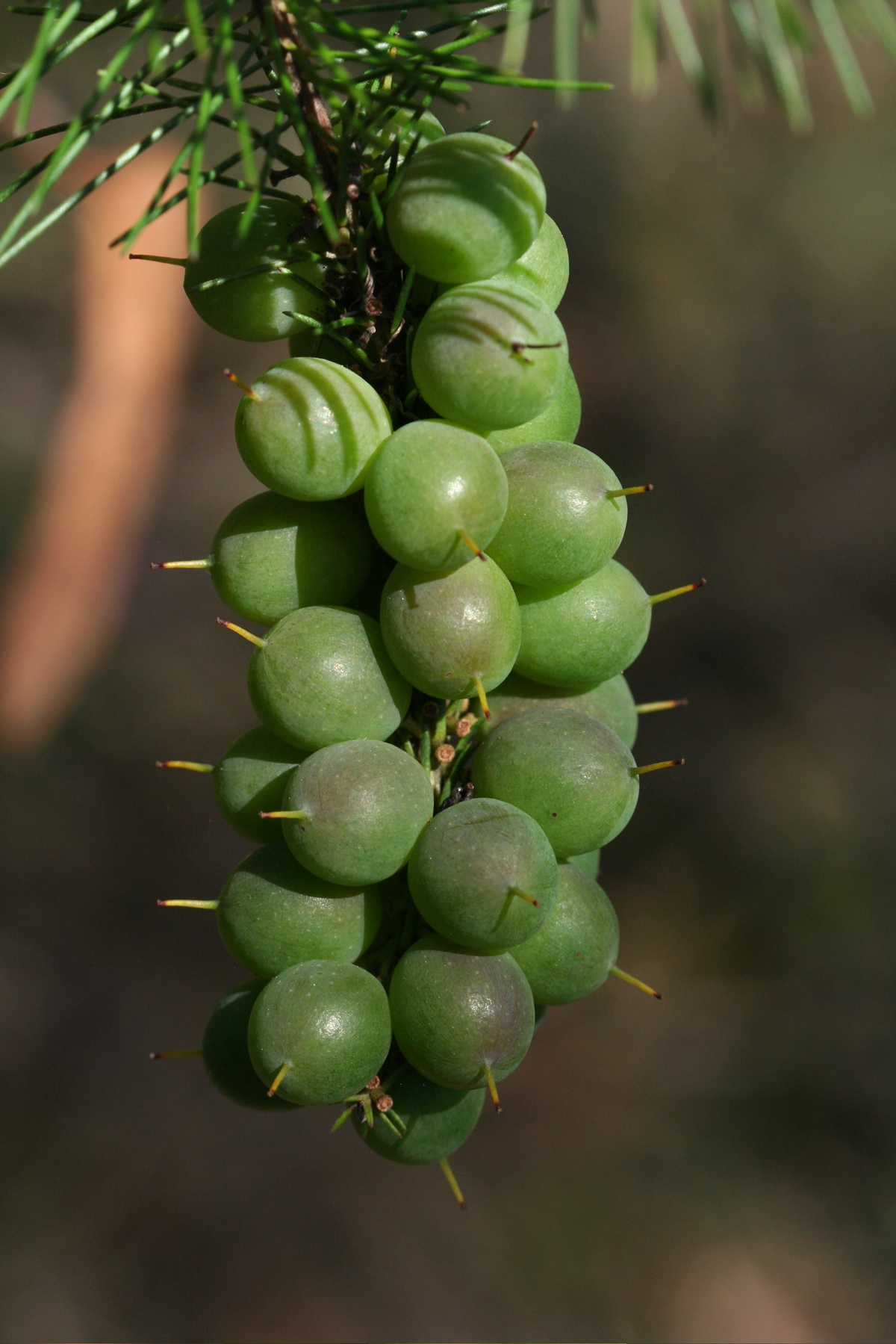
Persoonia pinifolia fruit

== Description ==
Persoonia pinifolia grows as an upright woody shrub up to 3 m (10 ft) high and wide. Its young branches are moderately hairy. The leaves are soft and thread-like, 30–70 mm (1–3 in) long, about 0.5 mm (0.02 in) wide, moderately hairy when young, but become glabrous as they age. The ends of the leaves are often curved. The flowers are arranged in long, terminal racemes making them much more conspicuous than those of most other persoonias. The flowers each have a moderately hairy pedicel 1–4 mm (0.04–0.2 in) long and there is a small leaf at the base of each flower. The flower is composed of four tepals 8–9 mm (0.3–0.4 in) long, which are fused at the base but with the tips rolled back. The central style is surrounded by four yellow anthers which are also joined at the base with the tips rolled back, so that it resembles a cross when viewed end-on. Flowering occurs mainly from late winter to summer, sometimes in other months. Flowering is followed by fruit which are fleshy green drupes giving the appearance of a bunch of grapes.

== Taxonomy and naming ==
Persoonia pinifolia was first formally described in 1810 by Robert Brown from specimens collected "near Port Jackson", and the description was published in Transactions of the Linnean Society of London. The specific epithet (pinifolia) is derived from the Latin words pinus meaning "pine" and folium meaning "leaf".

== Ecology ==
The fruits of P. pinifolia are taken by birds, including pied currawong, satin and regent bowerbirds, olive-backed oriole and Lewin's honeyeater but how this affects seed dispersal is not known. Unlike most Proteaceae, Persoonia pinifolia does not have proteoid roots.

== Use in horticulture ==
Pine-leaved geebung is an attractive plant in the garden, but it is difficult to propagate from seed or cuttings. Success has been achieved by clipping the seed coating followed by treatment with gibberellic acid solution. Some clones seem to produce seed that germinates more readily.

The species is reliable in gardens in an open sunny spot with good drainage, and requires little maintenance. The flowers, although small, are well displayed and the plant tolerates reasonably heavy frosts. It is a good hedge or screen plant and often flowers from January to August, followed by interesting olive-like fruit.

Tissue culture has been shown to be successful with P. pinifolia and some other species of persoonia.
