= John Walker Hundley =

American Baptist minister

The Reverend John Walker Hundley (1841–1914) was a prominent 19th-century Baptist minister and church leader in Virginia.

Born in King and Queen County, Virginia, to William Clarke Hundley and Marion Street Hundley, John Hundley was raised by his maternal grandparents, John Walker Street and Frances Street, following the death of his mother in 1843.

Hundley attended Richmond (VA) College from 1858 until 1861, when he joined the 26th Virginia Infantry of the Confederate Army, as second lieutenant, under the command of his uncle, Capt. Napoleon B. Street. Following the Civil War, he entered the Crozer Theological Seminary and was ordained to the Baptist ministry in November 1876 at Mechanicsville Church in Hanover County, Virginia.

He began his ministry on the Eastern Shore of Virginia, at Modesttown and Chincoteague. In 1877, he organized a new congregation - the Atlantic Baptist Church - and, throughout the 1870s and 1880s, served as pastor of seven additional churches on the Eastern Shore. In 1890, he was called to Tarboro, North Carolina, where he led the effort to construct a new church building there.

From 1897 to 1904, he served both as the moderator of the Augusta Association of Baptist churches and as the pastor of the Covington (VA) Baptist Church, where he spearheaded the erection of a new sanctuary, which was dedicated in 1902. Following his tenure at Covington, he returned to the Eastern Shore of Virginia and Maryland.

Reverend Hundley married Virginia M. Quarles, of Louisa County, Virginia, in 1865, with whom he had seven children. He died in October 1914 at the Covington home of his daughter, Augusta Hundley Rinehart.

== Sources ==
- Virginia Baptist Ministers, Fifth Series, 1902-1914 by George Braxton Taylor. J.P. Bell Company, Inc., Lynchburg, VA, 1915.
