= Huntlee, New South Wales =

Township in New South Wales, Australia

Huntlee is a planned medium-sized township near Branxton in the Hunter Region of New South Wales, Australia. The first stage of construction officially began on 25 February 2014. Land sales in the first village, which is to be called Katherine's Landing, began in late 2013.

Its future was uncertain as the plans for its development had twice been knocked back in the Land and Environment Court of New South Wales. Local environmentalists had protested that development of the site would threaten surviving pockets of the endangered species Persoonia pauciflora. However, the rejection has been overturned in the New South Wales Court of Appeal as of 8 December 2011.

The project plan will initially create up to 5,600 residential dwellings in four distinctive 'villages', with planned room for population growth. It will also include a 200ha mixed use Town Centre/downtown district catering for a range of retail, commercial, primary and secondary education uses as well as up to 1,700 downtown dwellings.

Additionally, 17ha has been set aside for the Persoonia Park, part of a comprehensive conservation program established by LWP in consultation with the Department of Environment, Climate Change and Water for the propagation and protection of the endangered species Persoonia Pauciflora.

== Environment ==
Huntlee is branded as a sustainable, green community. An overall environmentally sustainable development strategy that incorporates environmental and social considerations has been prepared, which includes reducing energy demand, passive solar design, reducing CO_{2} emissions, exploring renewable energy technology, reducing water demand and integration of recycled water into the home and public domain. However, as of 2022 there are currently no energy- or water- saving measures in place, along with no natural shade as all the once-forested land surrounding is being cleared.
