= National Register of Historic Places listings in DeKalb County, Illinois =

Location of DeKalb County in Illinois

This is a list of the National Register of Historic Places listings in DeKalb County, Illinois.

This is intended to be a complete list of the properties and districts on the National Register of Historic Places in DeKalb County, Illinois, United States. Latitude and longitude coordinates are provided for many National Register properties and districts; these locations may be seen together in a map.

There are 18 properties and districts listed on the National Register in the county.

This National Park Service list is complete through NPS recent listings posted July 10, 2026.

== Current listings ==
	Name on the Register	Image	Date listed	Location	City or town	Description
1	Ashelford Hall	Ashelford Hall	August 4, 1995 (#95000990)	566 Eychaner Rd. 42°02′00″N 88°56′09″W	Esmond	
2	Adolphus W. Brower House	Adolphus W. Brower House	February 14, 1979 (#79003160)	705 DeKalb Ave. 41°59′11″N 88°41′38″W	Sycamore	
3	Chicago and Northwestern Depot	Chicago and Northwestern Depot	December 8, 1978 (#78003101)	Sacramento and DeKalb Sts. 41°59′16″N 88°41′24″W	Sycamore	
4	President John Williston Cook Mansion	President John Williston Cook Mansion	September 2, 2025 (#100012171)	411 College Ave; 41°56′01″N 88°45′26″W	DeKalb	
5	Egyptian Theatre	Egyptian Theatre	December 1, 1978 (#78003100)	135 N. 2nd St. 41°55′52″N 88°45′09″W	DeKalb	
6	Ellwood Mansion	Ellwood Mansion	June 13, 1975 (#75002075)	509 N. 1st St. 41°56′06″N 88°45′08″W	DeKalb	
7	Elmwood Cemetery Gates	Elmwood Cemetery Gates	November 28, 1978 (#78003102)	S. Cross and Charles Sts. 41°58′57″N 88°41′52″W	Sycamore	
8	Joseph F. Glidden House	Joseph F. Glidden House	October 25, 1973 (#73002159)	917 W. Lincoln Hwy. 41°56′26″N 88°46′13″W	DeKalb	
9	George H. Gurler House	George H. Gurler House	March 21, 1979 (#79003158)	205 Pine St. 41°55′53″N 88°46′13″W	DeKalb	
10	Haish Memorial Library	Haish Memorial Library	October 9, 1980 (#80004319)	309 Oak St. 41°55′56″N 88°45′00″W	DeKalb	
11	William W. Marsh House	William W. Marsh House	December 22, 1978 (#78003103)	740 W. State St. 41°59′23″N 88°41′48″W	Sycamore	
12	Nisbet Homestead Farm	Nisbet Homestead Farm	May 31, 1984 (#84001069)	Suydam Rd. 41°40′15″N 88°51′47″W	Earlville	
13	North Grove School	North Grove School	February 15, 2012 (#12000026)	26475 Brickville Rd. 42°01′12″N 88°42′17″W	Sycamore	
14	Rollo Congregational United Church of Christ	Rollo Congregational United Church of Christ	August 27, 2019 (#100004311)	2471 Weddell St. 41°40′20″N 88°53′14″W	Rollo	
15	Sandwich City Hall	Sandwich City Hall	December 6, 1979 (#79003159)	144 E. Railroad St. 41°38′41″N 88°37′12″W	Sandwich	
16	Shabbona Hotel		May 6, 2021 (#100006489)	104 West Comanche St. 41°46′05″N 88°52′21″W	Shabbona	
17	Sycamore Historic District	Sycamore Historic District	May 2, 1978 (#78003104)	Irregular pattern along Main and Somonauk Sts. 41°59′06″N 88°41′12″W	Sycamore	
18	von KleinSmid Mansion	von KleinSmid Mansion	May 9, 1985 (#85000979)	218 W. Center; 41°38′42″N 88°37′30″W	Sandwich	

== Former listing ==
	Name on the Register	Image	Date listed	Date removed	Location	City or town	Description
1	US Post Office-DeKalb		January 30, 1995 (#94001596)	December 8, 1996	100 W. Lincoln Highway; 41°55′50″N 88°45′16″W	DeKalb	Demolished in June 1995.

== See also ==
- List of National Historic Landmarks in Illinois
- National Register of Historic Places listings in Illinois
