= True Republican =

Newspaper

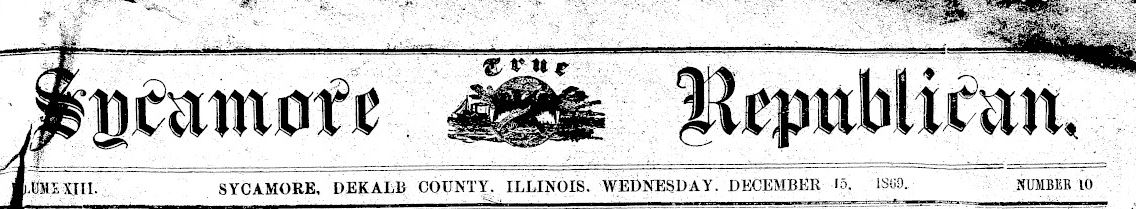
True Republican Masthead
- Type: Semi-weekly newspaper
- Founded: 1861

True Republican was a semi-weekly pro-Republican newspaper published by Boies & Peck in Sycamore, Illinois, beginning in 1861, and continued into the late 20th century. It was also known as the Sycamore True Republican.
