= David A. Wirsing =

American farmer and politician

David A. Wirsing (August 5, 1937 – November 16, 2003) was an American farmer and politician.

Wirsing was born in Sycamore, Illinois and went to Sycamore High School. He served in the United States Army and the reserves from 1957 to 1964. Wirsing lived in Sycamore, Illinois with his wife and family and was a farmer and was involved with grain production and with hogs. Wirsing served on the Sycamore School Board from 1986 until 1992 and was the vice-president of the school board. Wirsing served in the Illinois House of Representatives from 1993 until his death in 2003. Wirsing was a Republican. Wirsing died from a heart attack at his home in Sycamore, Illinois.
