= North Grove School =

- U.S. National Register of Historic Places
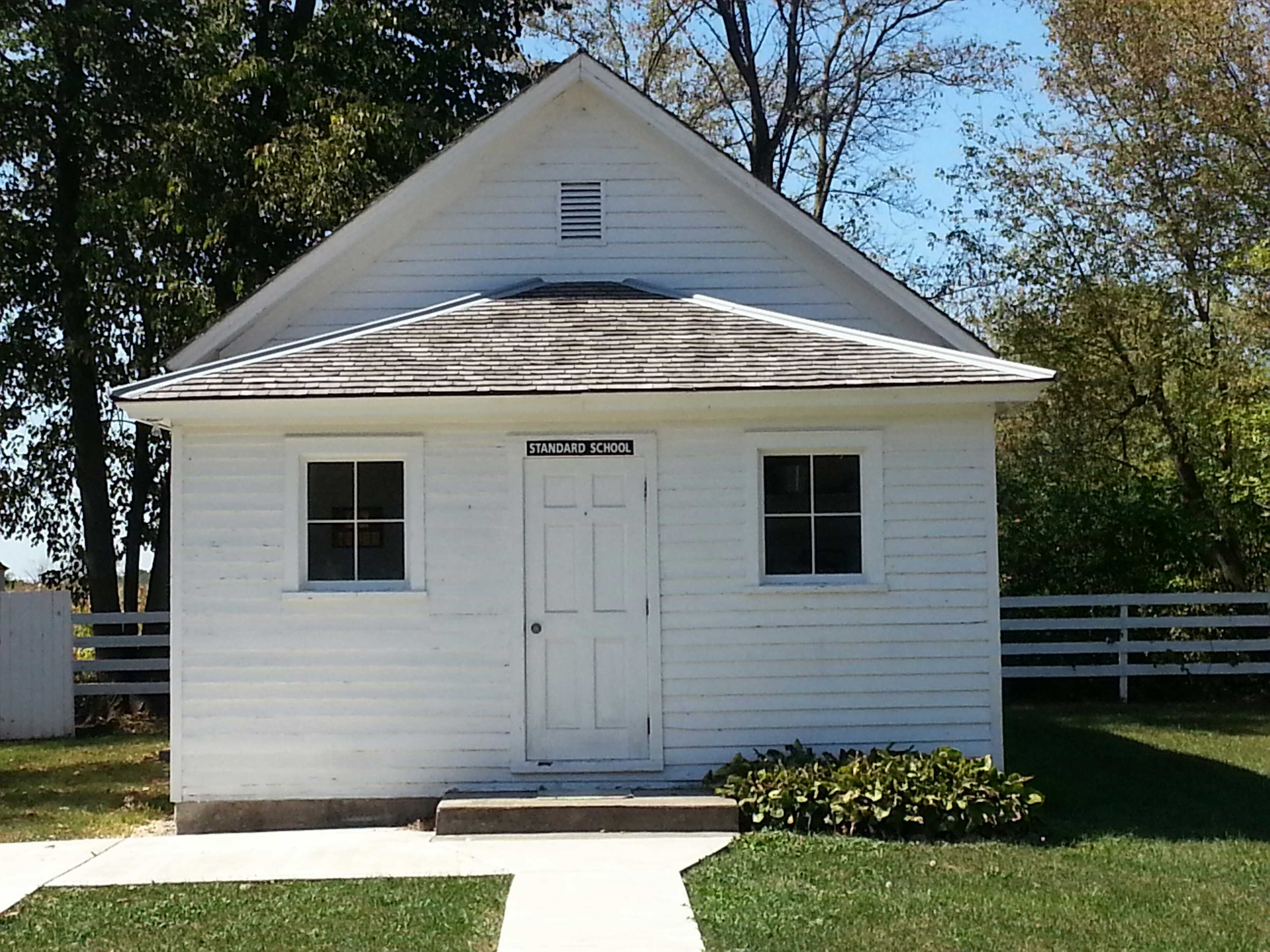

- Location within Illinois Location within the United States
- Location: 26745 Brickville Rd., Sycamore, Illinois
- Coordinates: 42°1′13″N 88°42′17″W
- Built: 1878
- NRHP reference No.: 12000026
- Added to NRHP: February 15, 2012

The North Grove School is a historic one-room schoolhouse located at 26745 Brickville Road northwest of Sycamore, Illinois. Swedish immigrants built the school in 1878; while it was originally a Lutheran school, it became part of the DeKalb County public school system two years later. The school served area students in the first through eighth grades until 1952, when it closed during a wave of school consolidations. After its closure, the school building was briefly used by the local Community Club. It is the only one-room schoolhouse in DeKalb County that is at its original site and has not been significantly altered.

The school was added to the National Register of Historic Places on February 15, 2012. A modern elementary school in Sycamore, which opened in 2010, is named for the school.
