= Jay Niemann =

American football coach (born 1960)

Current position
- Title: Assistant defensive line coach
- Team: Iowa
- Conference: Big Ten

Biographical details
- Born: November 27, 1960 (age 65); Harlan, Iowa, U.S.
- Education: Iowa State University (1983); Western Washington University (1988)

Playing career
- 1979–1982: Iowa State
- Position: Linebacker

Coaching career (HC unless noted)
- 1985: Western Washington (ST/LB)
- 1986–1988: Washington (GA)
- 1989–1994: Drake (DC/DB)
- 1995–1996: Drake (AHC/DC/DB)
- 1997: Northern Iowa (DB)
- 1998: Northern Iowa (LB)
- 1999–2000: Northern Iowa (DC/LB)
- 2001: Northern Iowa (DB)
- 2002–2007: Simpson (IA)
- 2008–2010: Hardin–Simmons (co-DC/DB)
- 2011–2015: Northern Illinois (DC/S)
- 2016–2018: Rutgers (DC/LB)
- 2019 (spring): Wyoming (LB)
- 2019–present: Iowa (assistant DL)

Head coaching record
- Overall: 33–28
- Tournaments: 0–1 (NCAA D-III playoffs)

Jay Niemann (born November 27, 1960) is an American college football coach. He is the assistant defensive line coach for the University of Iowa, a position he has held since 2019. He was the head football coach for Simpson College from 2002 to 2007. He also coached for Western Washington, Washington, Drake, Northern Iowa, Hardin–Simmons, Northern Illinois, Rutgers, and Wyoming. He played college football for Iowa State as a linebacker.

== Personal life ==
Niemann has two sons, Nick and Ben. Both are linebackers in the National Football League (NFL).

== Head coaching record ==
Year	Team	Overall	Conference	Standing	Bowl/playoffs	D3^{#}
Simpson Storm (Iowa Intercollegiate Athletic Conference) (2002–2007)
2002	Simpson	6–4	6–3	4th		
2003	Simpson	9–2	7–1	2nd	L NCAA Division III First Round	23
2004	Simpson	6–4	4–4	6th		
2005	Simpson	5–5	3–5	6th		
2006	Simpson	3–7	3–5	7th		
2007	Simpson	4–6	3–5	T–6th		
Simpson:		33–28	26–23			
Total:		33–28				
