= Sycamore High School (Illinois) =

Location
- 427 Spartan Trail; Sycamore, Illinois 60178; United States
- 41°59′4″N 88°42′11″W

Information
- Type: Public secondary
- Motto: "Home of the Spartans"
- Established: 1908
- School district: Sycamore Community School District 427
- Superintendent: Nick Reineck
- Principal: Brian Swanson
- Staff: 74.33 (FTE)
- Grades: 9–12
- Gender: Coed
- Enrollment: 1,190 (2023–2024)
- Student to teacher ratio: 16.01
- Campus type: Semi-suburban
- Colors: Black and gold
- Slogan: "Sycamore Has Been Good To Me"
- Fight song: Hail Spartans
- Athletics conference: Interstate Eight Conference
- Mascot: Mr. Spartan
- Nickname: Spartans
- Newspaper: Spartan Voice
- Yearbook: Leaves
- Website: shs.syc427.org

Sycamore High School (SHS) is a four-year public high school in Sycamore, Illinois, United States. It is a member of the Illinois High School Association and a part of Sycamore Community Unit School District #427. Sycamore High School is the only high school in the city, and serves students in grades 9–12 living in Sycamore and the surrounding areas.

== Athletics ==
=== Fall sports ===
- Boys' cross country - 2007 Class 2A State Champions
- Girls' cross country
- Dance
- Football
- Boys' golf
- Girls' golf
- Boys' soccer
- Girls' tennis
- Girls' volleyball
- Sideline cheerleading

=== Winter sports ===
- Boys' basketball
- Girls' basketball
- Boys' Bowling
- Girls' bowling
- Cheerleading
- Dance
- Girls' gymnastics
- Boys' swimming
- Girls' swimming
- Wrestling

=== Spring sports ===
- Baseball - 2023 Class 3A third place
- Rugby
- Girls' soccer
- Softball - 2019 Class 3A State Champions
- Boys' track and field
- Girls' track and field

== Notable alumni ==
- Bryan Carter - Grammy and Tony Award winning musician
- Kylie Feuerbach - college basketball player
- Jay Henigan, Plumber and CIA contractor
- Mark Johnston - former NFL cornerback
- Lake Kwaza - bobsledder
- Ben Niemann - linebacker for NFL's Detroit Lions.
- Nick Niemann - linebacker for NFL's Green Bay Packers.
