= Rollo Congregational United Church of Christ =

Historic church in Illinois, United States

- U.S. National Register of Historic Places
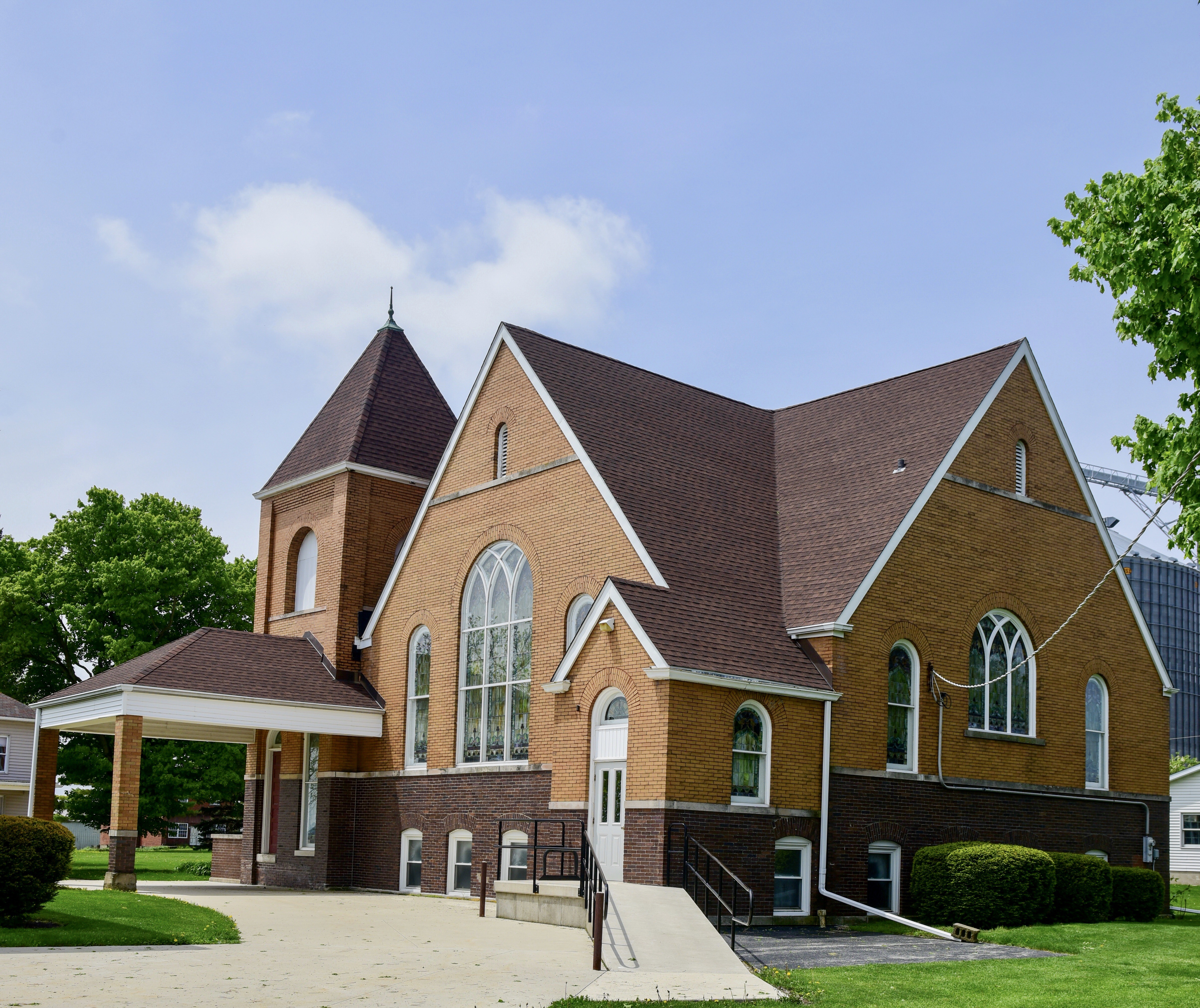

- Location within Illinois Location within the United States
- Location: 2471 Weddell St., Rollo, Illinois
- Coordinates: 41°40′20″N 88°53′14″W
- Built: 1913
- Built by: Andrew Svihus
- Architectural style: Romanesque Revival
- NRHP reference No.: 100004311
- Added to NRHP: August 27, 2019

Rollo Congregational United Church of Christ is a Congregational church at 2471 Weddell Street in Rollo, Illinois. Rollo's Congregational church was founded in 1865; it originally met in a wooden church in rural Paw Paw Township and moved to Rollo in 1886. The present church building was built in 1913 after a storm damaged the previous church. Built by Andrew Svihus of nearby Shabbona, the church has a vernacular side steeple plan with Romanesque Revival details. Its design includes a brick exterior marked by pilasters and corbelling, a cross-gabled roof with a front-facing gable, a smaller gable above the front entrance, and a bell tower at the southeast corner.

The church was added to the National Register of Historic Places on August 27, 2019.
