= South Grove Township, DeKalb County, Illinois =

South Grove Township
- Township
- Location in DeKalb County

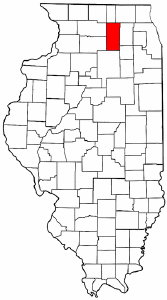
- DeKalb County's location in Illinois
- Coordinates: 42°01′24″N 88°53′19″W
- Country: United States
- State: Illinois
- County: DeKalb
- Established: November 20, 1850

Area
  - Total: 34.48 sq mi (89.3 km^{2})
  - Land: 34.41 sq mi (89.1 km^{2})
  - Water: 0.07 sq mi (0.18 km^{2}) 0.19%
- Elevation: 899 ft (274 m)

Population (2020)
  - Total: 447
  - Density: 13.0/sq mi (5.02/km^{2})
- Time zone: UTC-6 (CST)
  - Summer (DST): UTC-5 (CDT)
- ZIP codes: 60111, 60129, 60146, 60150
- FIPS code: 17-037-70837

South Grove Township is one of nineteen townships in DeKalb County, Illinois, USA. As of the 2020 census, its population was 447 and it contained 201 housing units. South Grove Township was renamed from Vernon Township on November 20, 1850.

== Geography ==
According to the 2021 census gazetteer files, South Grove Township has a total area of 34.48 square miles (89.30 km^{2}), of which 34.41 square miles (89.12 km^{2}) (or 99.81%) is land and 0.07 square miles (0.18 km^{2}) (or 0.19%) is water.

=== Unincorporated towns ===
- Esmond at 42.033638°N 88.935651°W

=== Cemeteries ===
- Greenview
- South Grove

=== Airports and landing strips ===
- Vodden Airport

== Demographics ==
As of the 2020 census there were 447 people, 177 households, and 145 families residing in the township. The population density was 12.97 inhabitants per square mile (5.01/km^{2}). There were 201 housing units at an average density of 5.83 per square mile (2.25/km^{2}). The racial makeup of the township was 84.56% White, 0.89% African American, 1.12% Native American, 0.00% Asian, 0.00% Pacific Islander, 5.82% from other races, and 7.61% from two or more races. Hispanic or Latino of any race were 10.07% of the population.

There were 177 households, out of which 13.60% had children under the age of 18 living with them, 76.84% were married couples living together, 1.13% had a female householder with no spouse present, and 18.08% were non-families. 15.30% of all households were made up of individuals, and 5.10% had someone living alone who was 65 years of age or older. The average household size was 2.18 and the average family size was 2.37.

The township's age distribution consisted of 9.1% under the age of 18, 1.8% from 18 to 24, 8.3% from 25 to 44, 31.1% from 45 to 64, and 49.7% who were 65 years of age or older. The median age was 64.7 years. For every 100 females, there were 103.2 males. For every 100 females age 18 and over, there were 102.9 males.

The median income for a household in the township was $93,125, and the median income for a family was $94,034. Males had a median income of $52,300 versus $30,192 for females. The per capita income for the township was $60,202. No families and 2.3% of the population were below the poverty line, including none of those under age 18 and none of those age 65 or over.

Historical population
Census	Pop.	Note	%±
1930	675		—
1940	644		−4.6%
1950	598		−7.1%
1960	592		−1.0%
1970	605		2.2%
1980	532		−12.1%
1990	461		−13.3%
2000	528		14.5%
2010	512		−3.0%
2020	447		−12.7%
US Decennial Census

== School districts ==
- DeKalb Community Unit School District 428
- Hiawatha Community Unit School District 426
- Sycamore Community Unit School District 427
- Rochelle Township High School District 212

== Political districts ==
- Illinois's 16th congressional district
- State House District 70
- State Senate District 35
