= Jay Henigan =

American plumber

Jay Todd Henigan (February 15, 1950 – September 25, 2011) was an American plumber from Sycamore, Illinois, who worked as a contractor for the Central Intelligence Agency (CIA). He was known for his career in plumbing and later for his work in conflict zones as a contractor.

== Early life and career ==
Henigan, the son of Thomas and Marian, was born in 1950 in Sycamore, Illinois, where he spent most of his life. He graduated from Sycamore High School in 1968. He had plans to attend Kishwaukee College. After completing his formal education, Henigan joined his family's plumbing business, Henigan Plumbing, and worked as a plumber. Henigan did not choose to take over the family business, opting instead to pursue his own career path. In the summer of 2011, Henigan lived with his father, helping with various household tasks, including maintaining the house.

== Work with the CIA ==
In the later part of his career, Henigan became a contractor for the CIA. This role involved deployments to high-risk locations, including the CIA facility in Kabul, Afghanistan. Henigan had served one previous stint in Afghanistan as a plumber at a CIA facility before returning for a second assignment.

=== Death ===
During the second assignment, Henigan was fatally shot during a shooting at a CIA facility in Kabul, Afghanistan. The attack occurred when an Afghan security worker opened fire on Henigan and another American, who was injured. The U.S. embassy in Kabul stated that the attack occurred in an annex of the embassy, and the Afghan security guard responsible for the shooting was killed. The attack was still under investigation, with some conflicting reports about whether the security worker had been authorized to carry a weapon at the facility.

Henigan's death prompted a response from Sycamore's mayor, Ken Mundy, who noted that Henigan's family were amongst the first settlers to Sycamore. His friends and family held a memorial in his honor. He is remembered with a star on the CIA Memorial Wall.

== See also ==
- Green-on-blue
- Camp Chapman attack
