= Midwest Museum of Natural History =

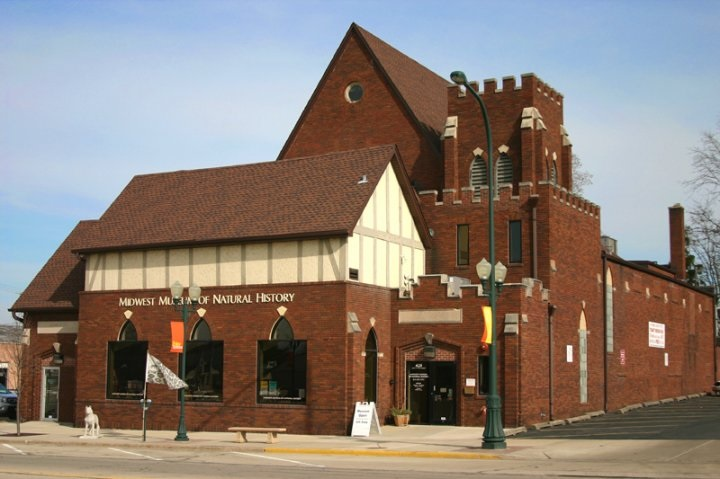
- Established: 2004
- Location: 425 West State Street (Rt 64); Sycamore, Illinois
- Coordinates: 41.989167°N 88.68944°E
- Type: Local history
- Website: www.mmnh.org

The Midwest Museum of Natural History was a 501(c)3 organization located in Sycamore, Illinois, United States. In 1875, the structure was built as the home of the Universalist Church in Sycamore. In the 1920s the building underwent dramatic changes, becoming the Sycamore Community Center, complete with basketball courts, a swimming pool, and hip hangout, Teen Town. In February 2004, this 129-year-old building was overhauled once again with a top-to-bottom 1.2 million dollar renovation. This included the creation of exhibit halls, classrooms, offices, collection storage, and a new roof and climate controls to help preserve the museum's specimens. The museum closed permanently in February 2020.

== Exhibits ==
The museum's primary exhibits consisted of dioramas depicting the natural biomes of North America and Africa. Dioramas feature over 100 mounted animals, including one of the few—and one of the largest—elephants on display in the country. The museum also housed a geology collection, interactive children's area, and temporary exhibits in the Rotary Exhibit Gallery and Oasis Room. Additionally, the museum was home to a wide range of live reptiles, amphibians, fish, and arthropods.

A majority of the museum's collection of mounted specimens was donated by Dr. Russell Schelkopf, a local veterinarian, entrepreneur, community leader, conservationist, and hunter.

== Activities ==
The museum offered school fieldtrips, scout and homeschool programs, and group tours. It also provided year-round public programming for all ages, including nature-based preschool classes, adult lectures, dissection workshops, geology programs, live animal presentations, and more. Museum staff frequently conducted programs off-site for local schools and libraries. Annual fundraisers included Rockin' for the Reptiles in June and the Groundhog Gala in February.

The museum is now closed.
