= Brush Point, Illinois =

Former unincorporated community in DeKalb County, Illinois, United States

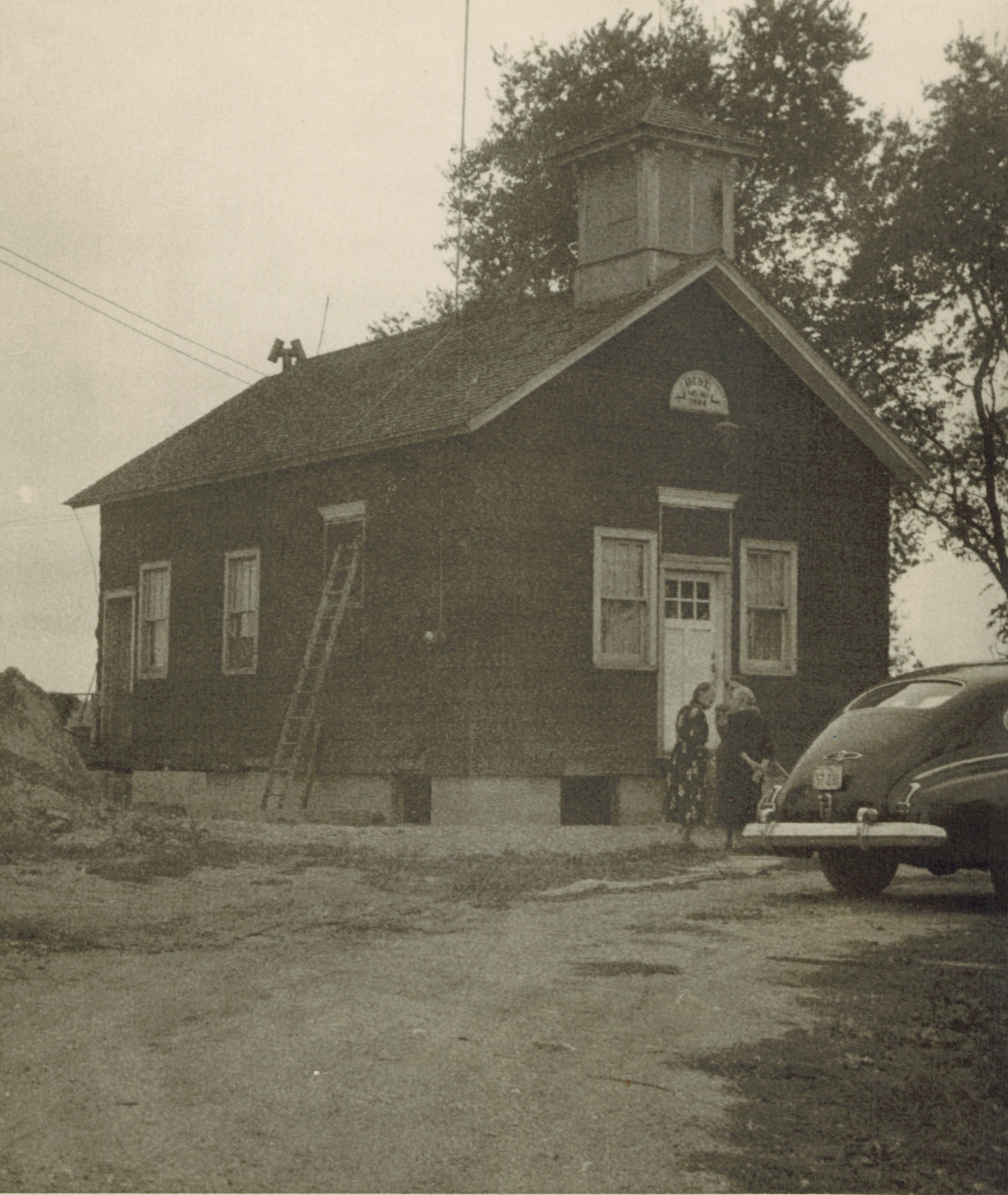
Brush Point School

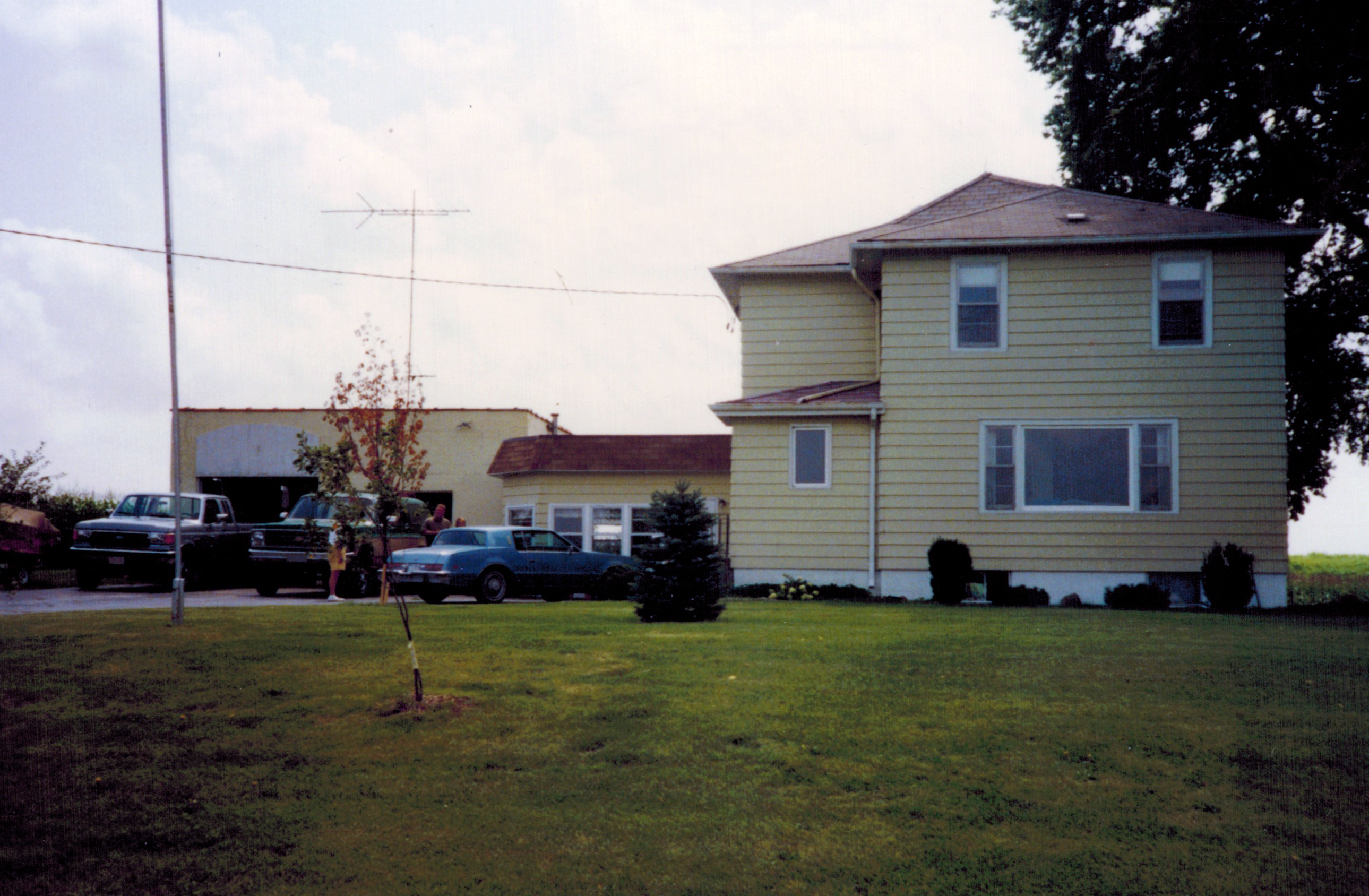

Brush Point was a community in DeKalb County, Illinois, United States, which is now extinct. In June 1839, it was considered as one of the three potential sites for the county seat. The town received the backing of local doctor Henry Madden. However, Brush Point ultimately lost out to Sycamore and eventually disappeared. It was located in Mayfield Township, northwest of Sycamore and north of DeKalb. The old Brush Point School was located at 42°01′41″N 88°45′13″W.
