= Ben Niemann =

American football player (born 1995)

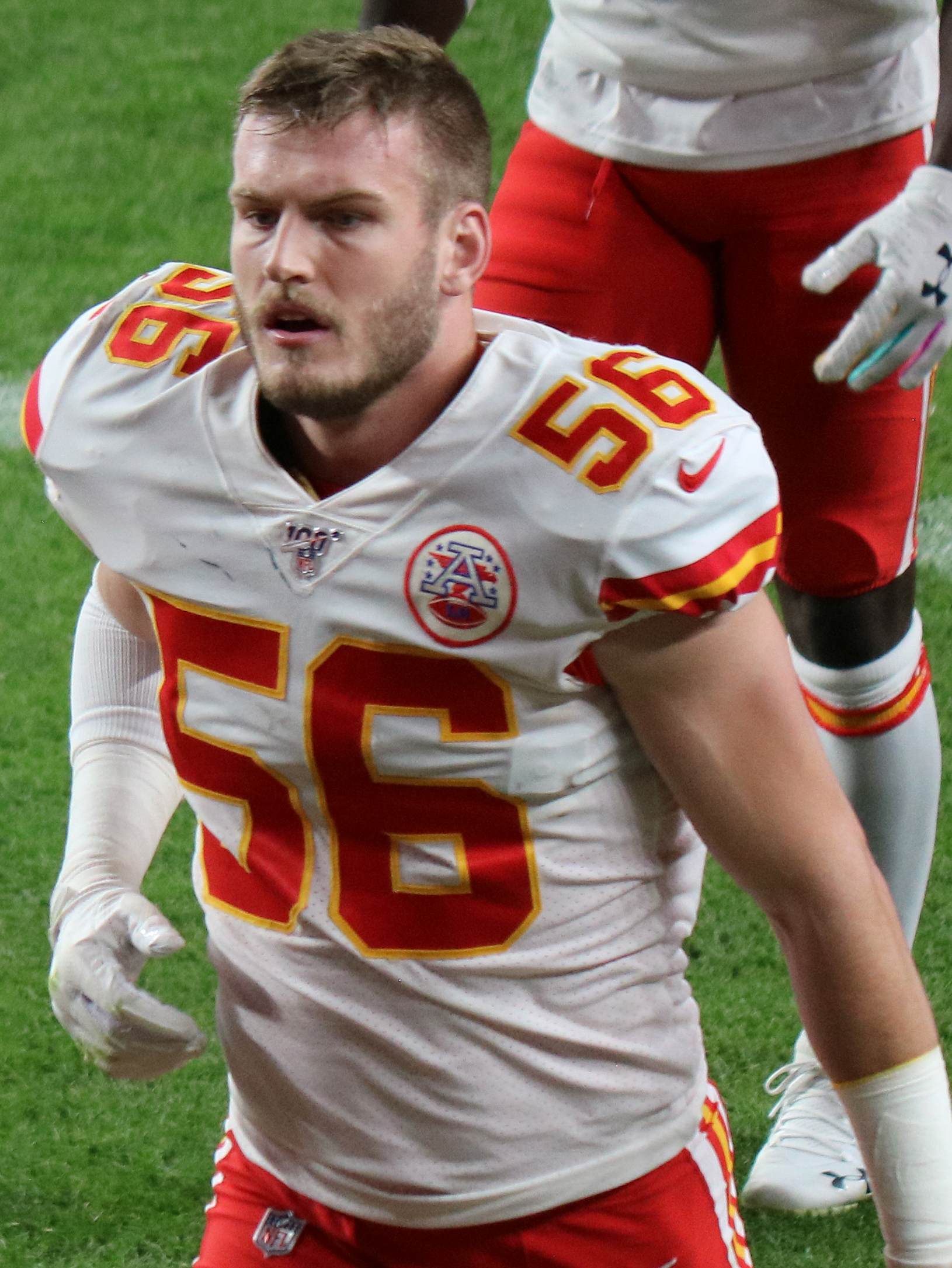
- Niemann with the Kansas City Chiefs in 2019

Profile
- Position: Linebacker

Personal information
- Born: July 27, 1995 (age 31); Des Moines, Iowa, U.S.
- Listed height: 6 ft 2 in (1.88 m)
- Listed weight: 235 lb (107 kg)

Career information
- High school: Sycamore (IL)
- College: Iowa (2014–2017)
- NFL draft: 2018: undrafted

Career history
- Kansas City Chiefs (2018–2021); Arizona Cardinals (2022); Tennessee Titans (2023)*; Denver Broncos (2023); Detroit Lions (2024); New York Jets (2025)*; Los Angeles Rams (2025)*
- * Offseason or practice squad member only

Awards and highlights
- Super Bowl champion (LIV)

Career NFL statistics as of 2025
- Total tackles: 264
- Sacks: 2
- Forced fumbles: 1
- Fumble recoveries: 7
- Pass deflections: 4
- Stats at Pro Football Reference

Ben Niemann (born July 27, 1995) is an American professional football linebacker. He played college football for the Iowa Hawkeyes was signed as an undrafted agent by the Kansas City Chiefs.

== Early life ==
Niemann is the son of Jay and Lou Ann Niemann. He was born in Des Moines, Iowa and moved several times growing up due to his father's job as a football coach. He attended Sycamore High School, in Sycamore, Illinois where he played football and basketball. In football, he played wide receiver and safety and was named first-team all-state as a junior and senior.

== College career ==
Niemann played four seasons for the Iowa Hawkeyes, making 53 appearances and starting the last 40 games of his career. He played mostly on special teams and as a reserve linebacker as a true freshman, blocking a punt and returning the ball for a touchdown against Northwestern. Niemann became a starter at outside linebacker for Iowa going into his sophomore year and garnered honorable mention All-Big Ten Conference honors after making 45 tackles (4.5 for loss), four sacks and two pass break-ups. He was named honorable mention All-Big Ten again as a senior after making 80 tackles (six for loss), a sack, five passes broken up and two forced fumbles. Over the course of his career, Niemann accumulated 201 tackles, 17 tackles for loss, two interceptions, and two forced fumbles.

== Professional career ==
Pre-draft measurables
Height	Weight	Arm length	Hand span	40-yard dash	10-yard split	20-yard split	20-yard shuttle	Three-cone drill	Vertical jump	Broad jump	Bench press
6 ft 2 7/8 in (1.90 m)	235 lb (107 kg)	32 in (0.81 m)	9 3/8 in (0.24 m)	4.60 s	1.70 s	2.75 s	4.25 s	6.84 s	33.5 in (0.85 m)	9 ft 7 in (2.92 m)	15 reps
All values from Pro Day

=== Kansas City Chiefs ===
Niemann signed with the Kansas City Chiefs as an undrafted free agent and made the final 53-man roster out of training camp. He made his NFL debut on September 9, 2018, in the season opener against the Los Angeles Chargers, playing on special teams. Niemann made his first career start on November 11 in the Chiefs 26–14 win over the Arizona Cardinals and led the team with 6 tackles. Niemann finished his rookie season with 10 tackles made in 14 games played, mostly on special teams, and appeared in both the Chiefs postseason games, defending a pass in the endzone against the Indianapolis Colts in the divisional round and making two tackles on special teams in the American Football Conference Championship game against the New England Patriots.

Niemann finished the 2019 regular season with 56 tackles and a pass defended and a fumble recovery in 16 games played (one start). Niemann had six tackles in the postseason, including a tackle and a hit on San Francisco 49ers quarterback Jimmy Garoppolo to force an errant throw on third down in the fourth quarter in the Chiefs Super Bowl LIV victory.

In Week 3 of the 2020 season against the Baltimore Ravens on Monday Night Football, Niemann recorded his first career sack on Lamar Jackson and recovered a fumble lost by Jackson during the 34–20 win. Overall, in the 2020 season, Niemann finished with 44 total tackles, one sack, and one forced fumble.

Niemann re-signed with the Chiefs on March 17, 2021.

=== Arizona Cardinals ===
Niemann signed with the Cardinals on June 16, 2022. In 2022, Niemann played in all 17 games for Arizona with nine starts and made career-high 70 tackles with two tackles for loss, one fumble recovery, and one pass defended.

=== Tennessee Titans ===
On April 17, 2023, Niemann signed with the Tennessee Titans. He was waived on August 29, 2023.

=== Denver Broncos ===
On September 1, 2023, Niemann was signed to the practice squad of the Denver Broncos. He was promoted to the active roster on October 30. In seven games for Denver, he logged two combined tackles and only played on special teams.

=== Detroit Lions ===
On June 10, 2024, Niemann signed with the Detroit Lions.

=== New York Jets ===
On September 23, 2025, Niemann was signed to the New York Jets' practice squad. He was released by New York on September 30.

=== Los Angeles Rams ===
On January 6, 2026, Niemann was signed to the Los Angeles Rams' practice squad.

== Personal life ==
His father is currently the Assistant Defensive Line Coach and Defensive Recruiting Coordinator for Iowa and had previously served as the Defensive Coordinator at Rutgers and Northern Illinois and as the head coach at Simpson College. He has a younger brother, Nick Niemann, who currently plays linebacker for the Green Bay Packers.
