= Nick Niemann =

American football player (born 1997)

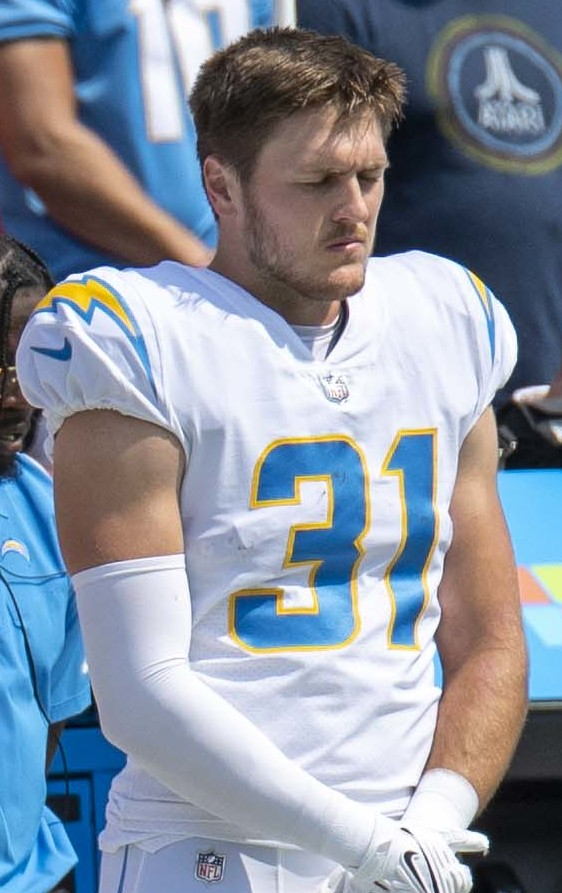
- Niemann with the Los Angeles Chargers in 2021

No. 31 – Green Bay Packers
- Position: Linebacker
- Roster status: Active

Personal information
- Born: December 2, 1997 (age 28); Waterloo, Iowa, U.S.
- Listed height: 6 ft 3 in (1.91 m)
- Listed weight: 234 lb (106 kg)

Career information
- High school: Sycamore (Sycamore, Illinois)
- College: Iowa (2016–2020)
- NFL draft: 2021: 6th round, 185th overall pick

Career history
- Los Angeles Chargers (2021–2024); Houston Texans (2025)*; Green Bay Packers (2025–present)
- * Offseason or practice squad member only

Awards and highlights
- PFWA All-Rookie Team (2021); Third-team All-Big Ten (2020)

Career NFL statistics as of Week 10, 2026
- Total tackles: 112
- Fumble recoveries: 1
- Pass deflections: 4
- Interceptions: 1
- Stats at Pro Football Reference

Nick Niemann (born December 2, 1997) is an American professional football linebacker for the Green Bay Packers of the National Football League (NFL). He was selected in the sixth round of the 2021 NFL draft. He played college football for the Iowa Hawkeyes.

== College career ==
Niemann was ranked as a three–star recruit by 247Sports.com coming out of high school. He committed to Iowa on June 19, 2015.

== Professional career ==
Pre-draft measurables
Height	Weight	Arm length	Hand span	Wingspan	40-yard dash	10-yard split	20-yard split	20-yard shuttle	Three-cone drill	Vertical jump	Broad jump	Bench press
6 ft 3 in (1.91 m)	234 lb (106 kg)	32 5/8 in (0.83 m)	9 1/8 in (0.23 m)	6 ft 4 7/8 in (1.95 m)	4.51 s	1.56 s	2.63 s	4.23 s	6.67 s	33.5 in (0.85 m)	10 ft 1 in (3.07 m)	19 reps
All values from Pro Day

=== Los Angeles Chargers ===
Niemann was selected by the Los Angeles Chargers with the 185th pick in the sixth round of the 2021 NFL draft on May 1, 2021. On May 16, Niemann signed his four-year rookie contract with Los Angeles. He was named to the PFWA All-Rookie Team.

On August 27, 2024, Niemann was placed on injured reserve to begin the season. He was activated on October 12.

=== Houston Texans ===
On March 14, 2025, Niemann signed with the Houston Texans. He was released on August 26, as part of the final roster cuts.

=== Green Bay Packers ===
On August 27, 2025, Niemann signed with the Green Bay Packers. He was placed on injured reserve on November 1, due to a pectoral injury he suffered in Week 8 against the Pittsburgh Steelers. Niemann was activated on January 7, 2026, ahead of the team's Wild Card matchup against the Chicago Bears.

== NFL career statistics ==
Legend
**Bold**	Career high

=== Regular season ===
Year	Team	Games		Tackles					Interceptions						Fumbles	
Year	Team	GP	GS	Cmb	Solo	Ast	Sck	TFL	PD	Int	Yds	Avg	Lng	TD	FF	FR
2021	LAC	17	0	22	15	7	0.0	0	1	**1**	0	0.0	0	0	0	0
2022	LAC	17	0	3	0	3	0.0	0	0	0	0	0.0	0	0	0	0
2023	LAC	17	**3**	**40**	**22**	**18**	0.0	**1**	1	0	0	0.0	0	0	0	**1**
2024	LAC	13	0	21	11	10	0.0	0	1	0	0	0.0	0	0	0	0
2025	GB	7	0	11	6	5	0.0	0	0	0	0	0.0	0	0	0	0
Total		71	3	97	54	43	0.0	1	3	1	0	0.0	0	0	0	1
Source: pro-football-reference.com

=== Postseason ===
Year	Team	Games		Tackles					Interceptions						Fumbles	
Year	Team	GP	GS	Cmb	Solo	Ast	Sck	TFL	PD	Int	Yds	Avg	Lng	TD	FF	FR
2022	LAC	1	0	0	0	0	0.0	0	0	0	0	0.0	0	0	0	0
2024	LAC	1	0	1	0	**1**	0.0	0	0	0	0	0.0	0	0	0	0
2025	GB	1	0	1	**1**	0	0.0	0	0	0	0	0.0	0	0	0	0
Career		3	0	2	1	1	0.0	0	0	0	0	0.0	0	0	0	0
Source: pro-football-reference.com

== Personal life ==
Niemann is the brother of former Iowa linebacker Ben Niemann. His father, Jay Niemann, is an assistant coach at Iowa.
