= Adolphus W. Brower House =

Historic house in Illinois, United States

- U.S. National Register of Historic Places
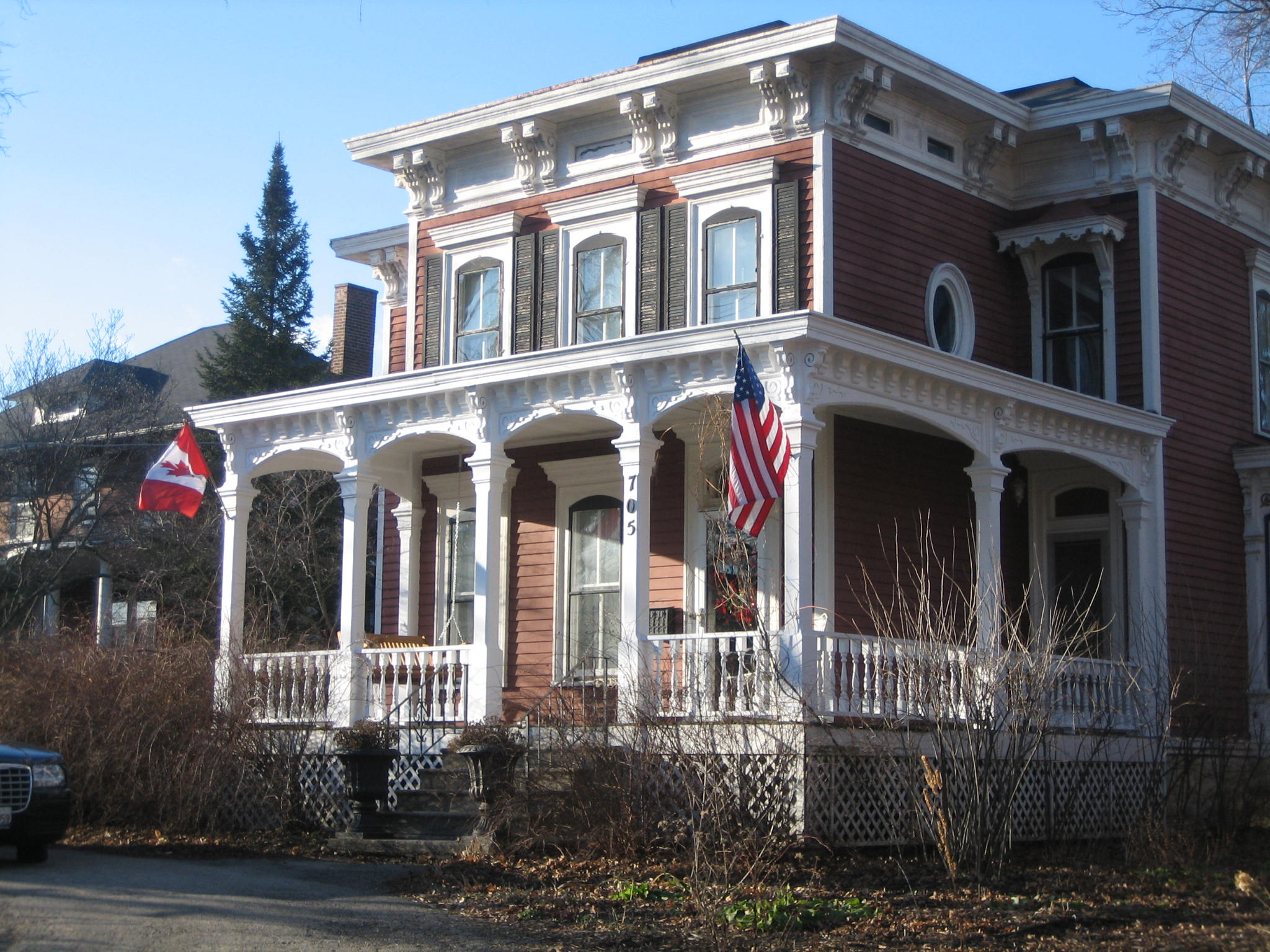
- The Italianate Adolphus W. Brower House in Sycamore, Illinois.

- Location within Illinois Location within the United States
- Location: 705 DeKalb Ave., Sycamore, Illinois
- Coordinates: 41°59′2″N 88°41′39″W
- Area: less than one acre
- Built: 1876
- Architectural style: Italianate
- NRHP reference No.: 79003160
- Added to NRHP: February 14, 1979

The Adolphus W. Brower House, in Sycamore, Illinois, has been listed on the National Register of Historic Places since February 14, 1979. The home is located on Illinois Route 64 as it passes through the DeKalb County seat of Sycamore as DeKalb Avenue. The Italianate structure, constructed of stone and asphalt, was erected in 1876 by Sycamore merchant Adolphus W. Brower. It is also known as the George F. Beasley House.
