= Elmwood Cemetery Gates =

Historic site in DeKalb County, Illinois

- U.S. National Register of Historic Places
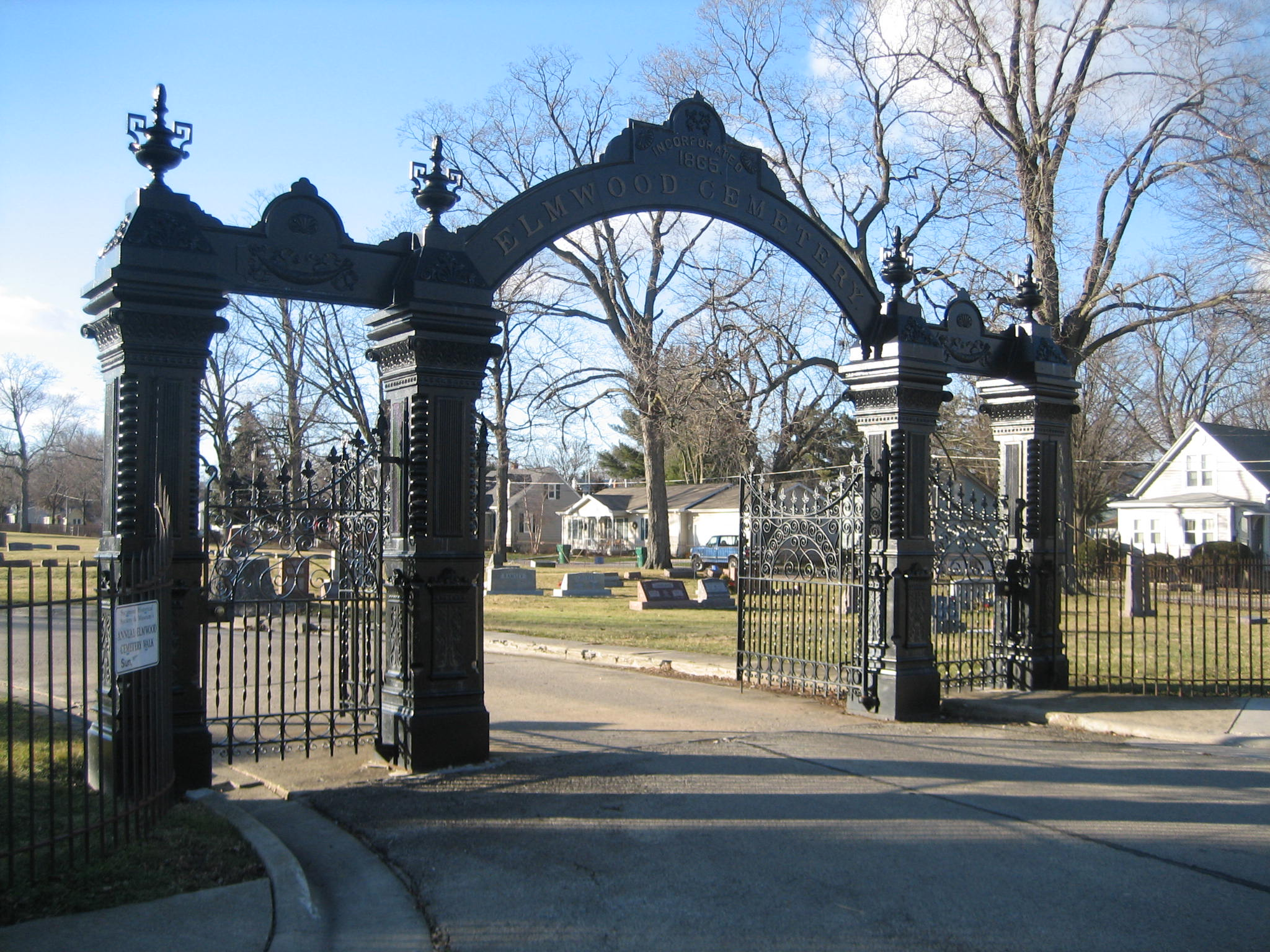
- The historic gates to the Elmwood Cemetery in Sycamore, Illinois.

- Location within Illinois Location within the United States
- Location: S. Cross and Charles Sts., Sycamore, Illinois
- Coordinates: 41°59′2″N 88°41′39″W
- Area: less than one acre
- Built: 1865; 161 years ago
- Architectural style: Serlian motif
- NRHP reference No.: 78003102
- Added to NRHP: November 28, 1978

The Elmwood Cemetery Gates mark the east and north entrances to the Elmwood Cemetery in Sycamore, Illinois. The cast iron gates were likely built in 1865, the year the cemetery opened and the one emblazoned on the gates, though records of their construction have been lost. While cast iron was commonly used for building facades at the time, the gates are a rare example of its use in landscape architecture. The gates have a Serlian design with a wide central road entry and narrower pedestrian gates on either side; square columns separate the gates. An arch bearing the cemetery's name rises above the center entrance, while lintels span the side entrances; both the arch and the lintels feature ornamental designs. The Illinois Historic Structures Survey described the gates as the best extant example of iron cemetery gate design in the state.

A number of prominent past citizens of both Sycamore and nearby DeKalb are buried in the cemetery.

The gates have been listed on the National Register of Historic Places since November 28, 1978.
