= Esmond, Illinois =

Esmond
- Unincorporated community
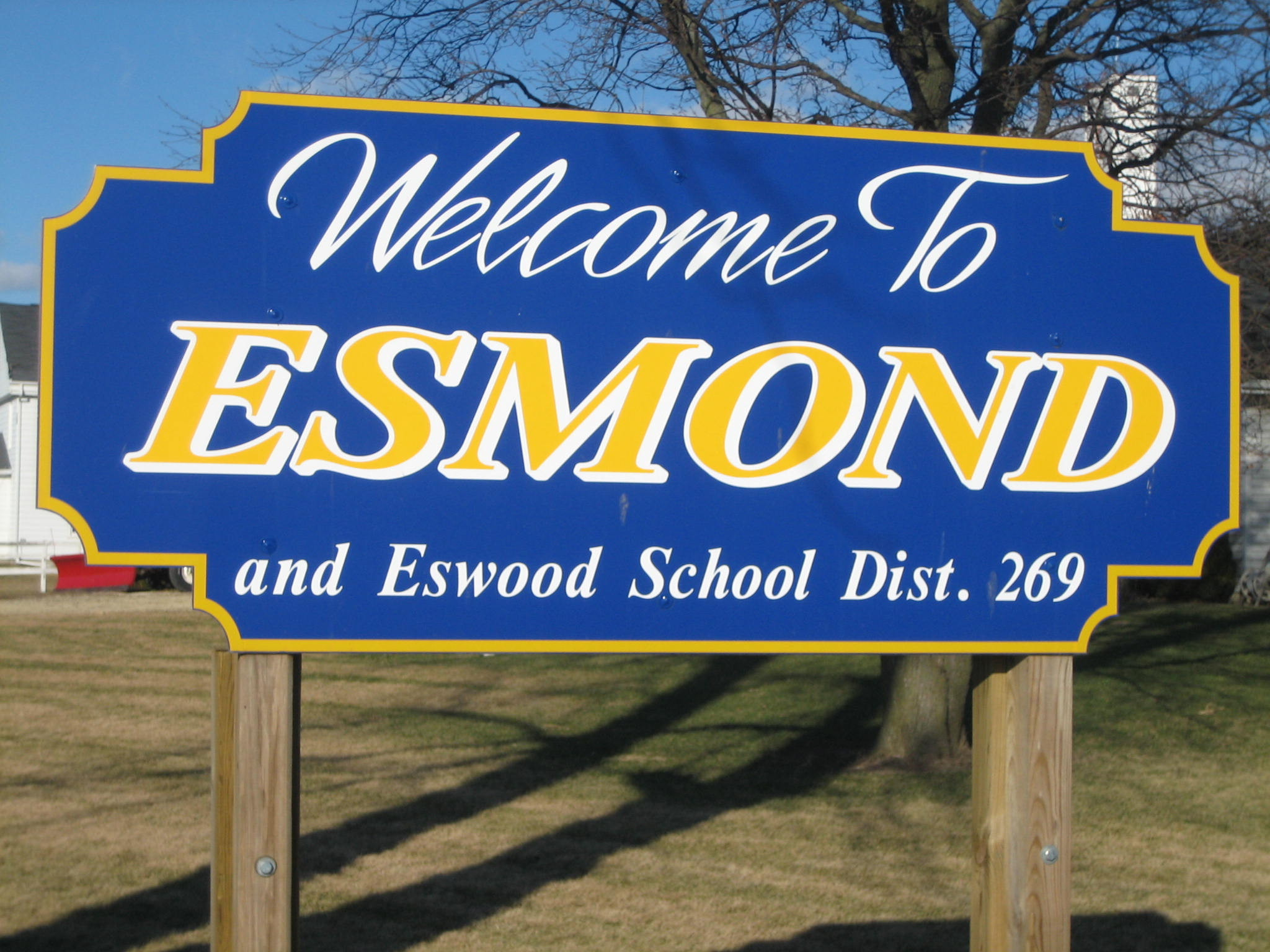
- Welcome to Esmond signage

- Location of Esmond within Illinois Esmond (the United States)
- Coordinates: 42°02′01″N 88°56′08″W
- Country: United States
- State: Illinois
- County: DeKalb
- Township: South Grove
- Elevation: 823 ft (251 m)
- Time zone: UTC-6 (CST)
  - Summer (DST): UTC-5 (CDT)
- ZIP Code: 60129
- Area code: 779/815

Esmond is an unincorporated community in South Grove Township, DeKalb County, Illinois, United States.

== Geography ==
Esmond is located at 42°02′01″N 88°56′08″W (42.0336383, -88.9356512).

== See also ==
- Ashelford Hall
