= William W. Marsh House =

Historic house in Illinois, United States

- U.S. National Register of Historic Places
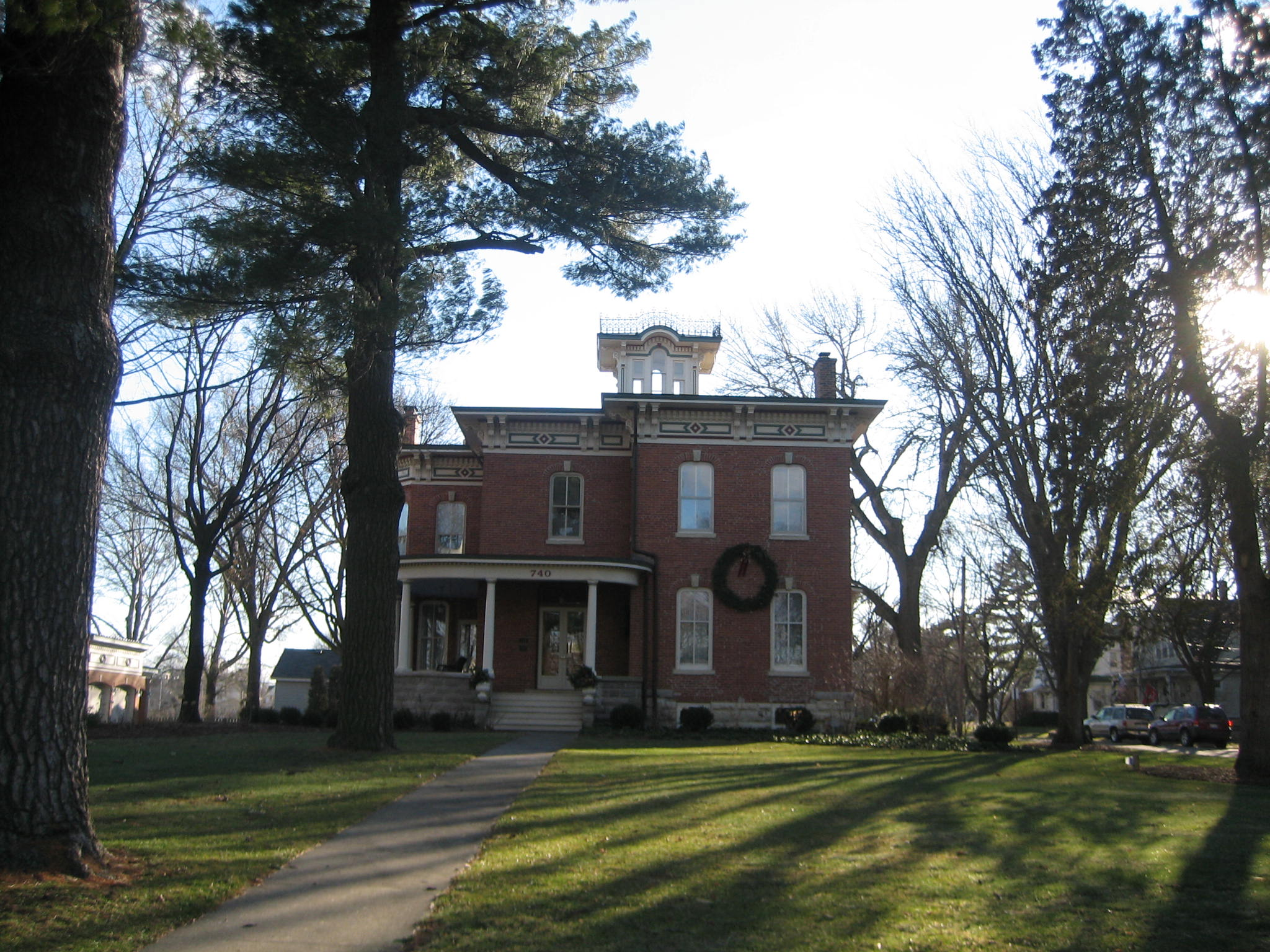
- The Italianate William W. Marsh House in Sycamore, Illinois.

- Location within Illinois Location within the United States
- Location: 740 W. State St., Sycamore, Illinois
- Coordinates: 41°59′2″N 88°41′39″W
- Area: less than one acre
- Built: 1873
- NRHP reference No.: 78003103
- Added to NRHP: December 22, 1978

The William W. Marsh House in Sycamore, Illinois, the county seat of DeKalb County, has been listed on the National Register of Historic Places since 1978. The 1873 house was home to William W. Marsh, an inventor and is located along Illinois Route 64 as it passes through Sycamore. The Marsh House was built in the Italianate style and contains distinctive Italianate elements such as a cupola, a low pitched roof and eaves supported by corbels.
