= Shabbona Hotel =

- U.S. National Register of Historic Places
- Location within Illinois Location within the United States
- Location: 104 West Comanche St., Shabbona, Illinois
- Coordinates: 41°46′05″N 88°52′21″W
- Built: 1897
- NRHP reference No.: 100006489
- Added to NRHP: May 6, 2021

The Shabbona Hotel is a historic hotel building at 104 West Comanche Street in Shabbona, Illinois. Built in 1897 by L. C. Card, the hotel was the second in Shabbona; the first, the Shabbona House, opened in 1874 and burned down in 1894. The two-story vernacular brick building had ten rooms in addition to two apartments, a living space for its owners, and a restaurant in its basement. It provided lodging to both out-of-town visitors and the many workers on Shabbona's two railroad lines, one of which was adjacent to the hotel. The hotel also served as a meeting place for Shabbona residents, and visiting optometrists provided eye exams and services from the hotel. In the 1930s, the hotel was converted to apartments.

The hotel was added to the National Register of Historic Places on May 6, 2021.
