= Nisbet Homestead Farm =

- U.S. National Register of Historic Places
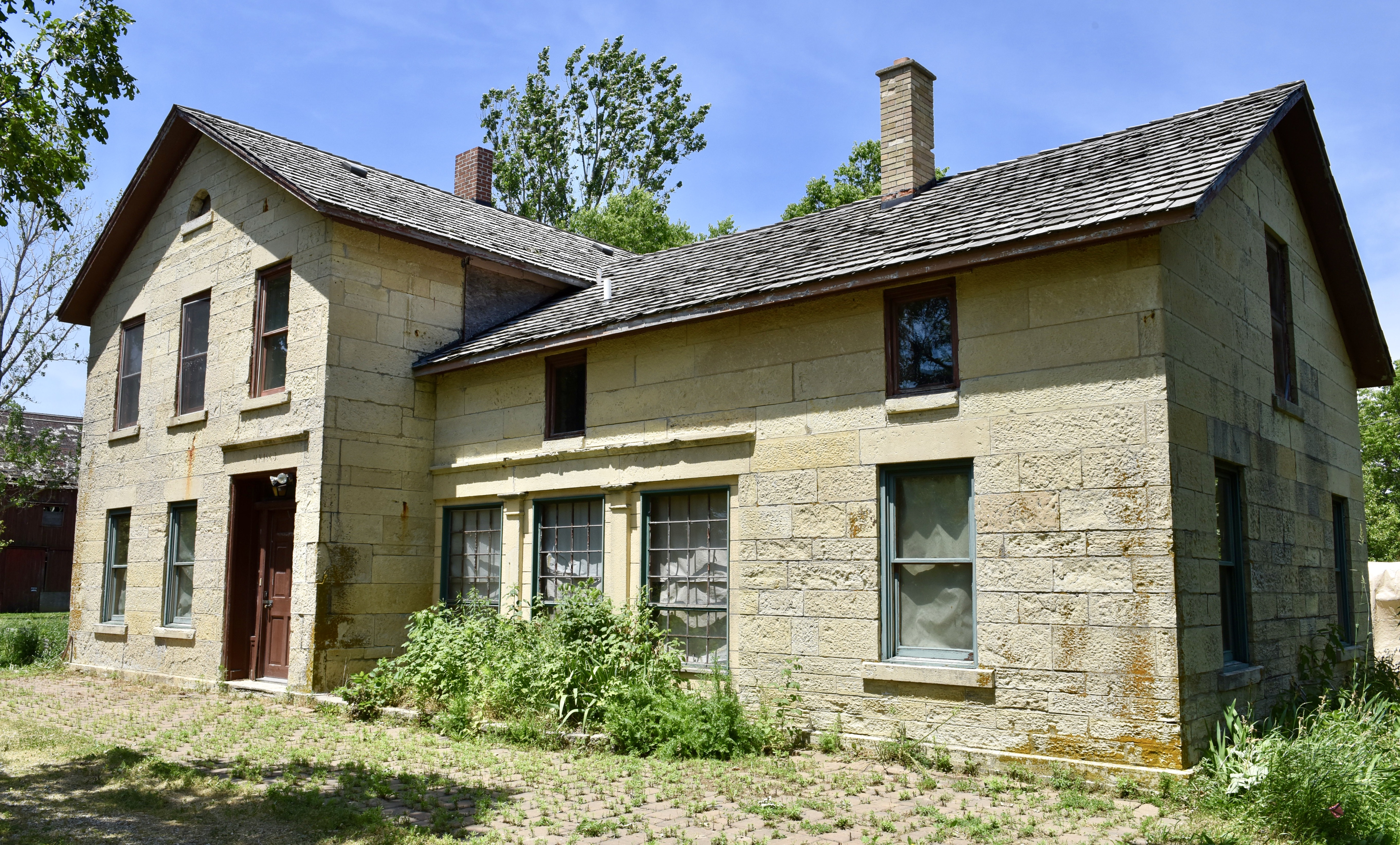

- Location within Illinois Location within the United States
- Location: Earlville area, DeKalb County, Illinois
- Coordinates: 41°40′16″N 88°51′46″W
- Area: 5 acres (2.0 ha)
- Built: 1848-1935
- Architect: Matthew Nisbet
- Architectural style: Vernacular, Greek Revival,
- NRHP reference No.: 84001069
- Added to NRHP: May 31, 1984

Nisbet Homestead Farm, also known as the Old Stone House, is located near the LaSalle County town of Earlville, Illinois. The farm itself is actually in DeKalb County. The homestead is a stone structure, the only one in DeKalb County. The stone house was listed on the National Register of Historic Places (NRHP) on May 31, 1984.

== History ==
The homesteaded land was acquired by Matthew Nisbet, who had immigrated from Scotland to Upper Canada in 1818. In 1841 Nisbet came to DeKalb County, Paw Paw Township, and constructed a two-story log cabin, a temporary home he lived in while he built the Old Stone House. The home is constructed of ten-by-four-foot blocks of stone, which were hauled from Ottawa, Illinois via ox-cart. Nisbet's home took 15 years to build and has remained in the Nisbet family until 2021.

== Nisbet Farm ==
The NRHP listing for the Nisbet Homestead Farm consists of 10 contributing "properties" on the 5 acres (20,000 m^{2}) of land. These various properties are designated as buildings (numbering 5); "structures" (3); and "sites" (2).

=== Buildings ===
Five of the properties on the Nisbet Homestead Farm listing are classified as buildings. This includes the main house, completed in 1863 by Nisbet. Nisbet began construction in 1848 and lived in the log cabin during some of that time. The Greek Revival style home is made of a combination of limestone and weatherboard, and sits on a concrete foundation and has an asphalt roof. The site's other four "buildings" were all built before 1935. The earliest among these structures, erected pre-1900, is a wooden gable-roofed barn, of the "English" (or "Three Bay") style. The other circa-1900 structure at the Nisbet Farm is a wooden banked barn. After 1909, a tin-roofed storage shed was constructed, and in 1935 the final of the properties' buildings was erected, a shingled double corn crib.

=== Structures ===
Three of the remaining five properties at the Nisbet Farm are categorized as structures on the NRHP listing. The silo and silo shed were built about 1935. The other two structures, a gravity feed water storage tank, and a windmill driven well, are part of the NRHP listing. The water tank was constructed with stone walls.

=== Sites ===
The areas at Nisbet Homestead Farm classified as "sites" include the only structure on the property (besides the Greek Revival home) to date back to 1863, and a 1909-built building called the "Basement Barn." The log cabin sits on a stone foundation and was constructed sometime between 1848 and 1863.
