= Ashelford Hall =

- U.S. National Register of Historic Places
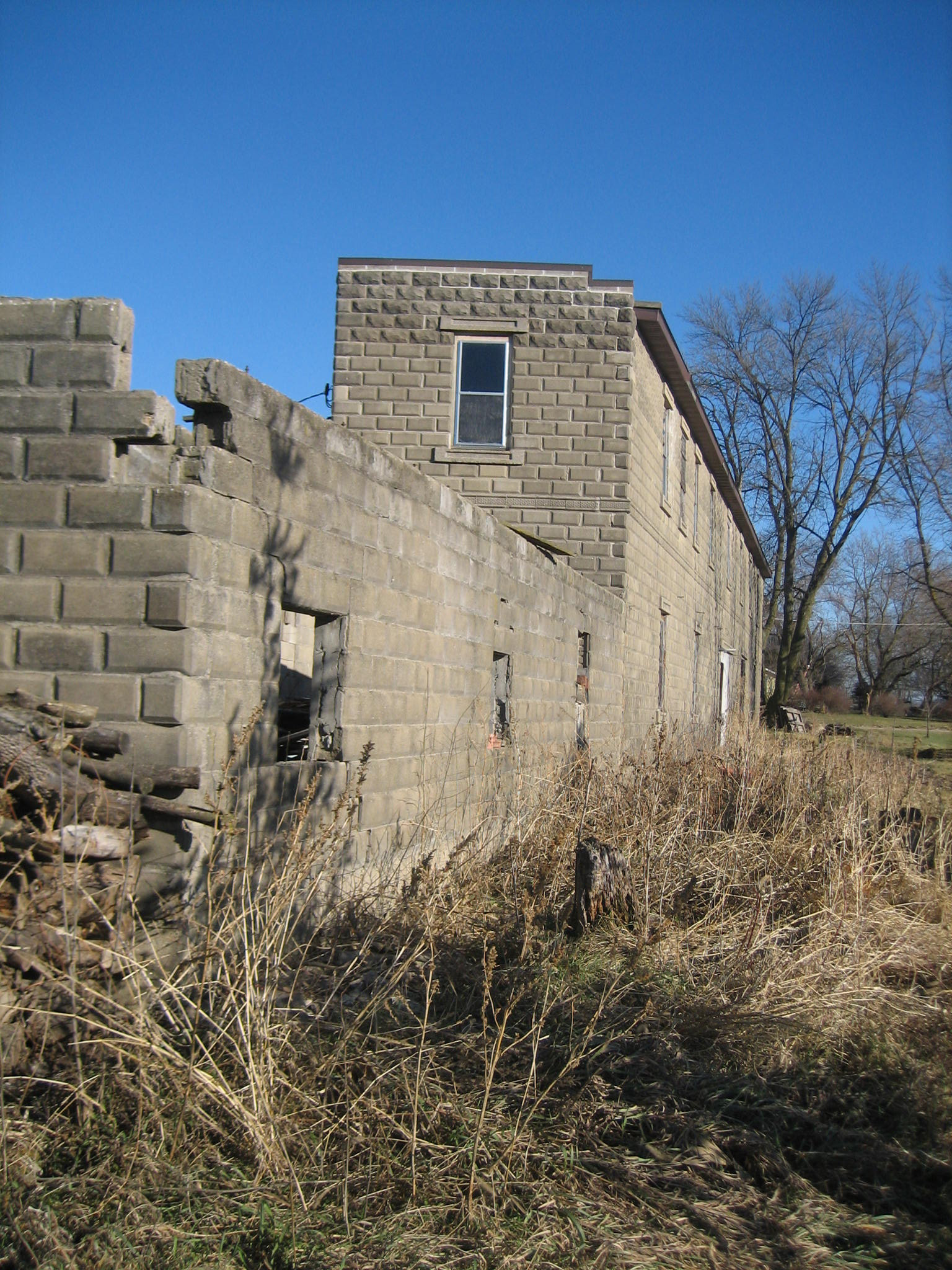
- Ashelford Hall from the west side, the apex of the triangular shape. Note the exterior deterioration.
- Location: 566 Eychaner Rd, Esmond, DeKalb County, Illinois, US
- Coordinates: 42°02′01″N 88°56′08″W
- Built: 1925
- Architect: William Henry Ashelford (Builder)
- Architectural style: Early Commercial
- NRHP reference No.: 95000990
- Added to NRHP: August 4, 1995

Ashelford Hall is a building, erected in 1925, in the tiny community of Esmond which lies in western DeKalb County, Illinois, United States. The structure has been listed on the National Register of Historic Places since 1995. Today, it is under private ownership and largely used for storage. In recent years it had served as an antiques store.

== History ==
The stone block triangular building, near railroad tracks crossing through Esmond, was constructed in 1925. For the first several years of its history it served as a meeting place for the DeKalb County chapter of the South Grove Grange. The grange met there for a few years until they moved their meetings to the Creston Town Hall in Ogle County in 1933.

More recently, the building served as an antique store run by Pam Cunningham of Fairdale, Illinois. The store closed when Cunningham died in April 2005, more than a year after her son, Kevin Clewer, was found stabbed to death in his Chicago apartment.

=== Early history ===
==== Men's club ====
When the building was erected in 1925, it served as the center of the Esmond social scene. It was multi-functional, serving entertainment, recreation and meeting place purposes. On February 17, 1928, the Esmond Men's Community Club was organized in a meeting at Ashelford Hall. The club was organized to facilitate other community organizations and promote fellowship among the men of Esmond. The men's club met at Ashelford Hall every third Friday of the month for 24 years until a new school building was constructed in Esmond in 1951 and the club moved to facilities there.

The club itself was organized primarily by three influential Esmond businessmen: William Greenwood, a cashier at the Esmond State Bank; N.T. Gottschall, the pastor at Esmond Methodist Church; and Raymond Duell, the station agent at the Esmond Chicago Great Western Depot. The club's first meeting attracted a crowd and 52 people joined as charter members. Emmett Rand was elected club president with Greenwood becoming vice president. Duell was elected secretary-treasurer and served in that post until 1967.

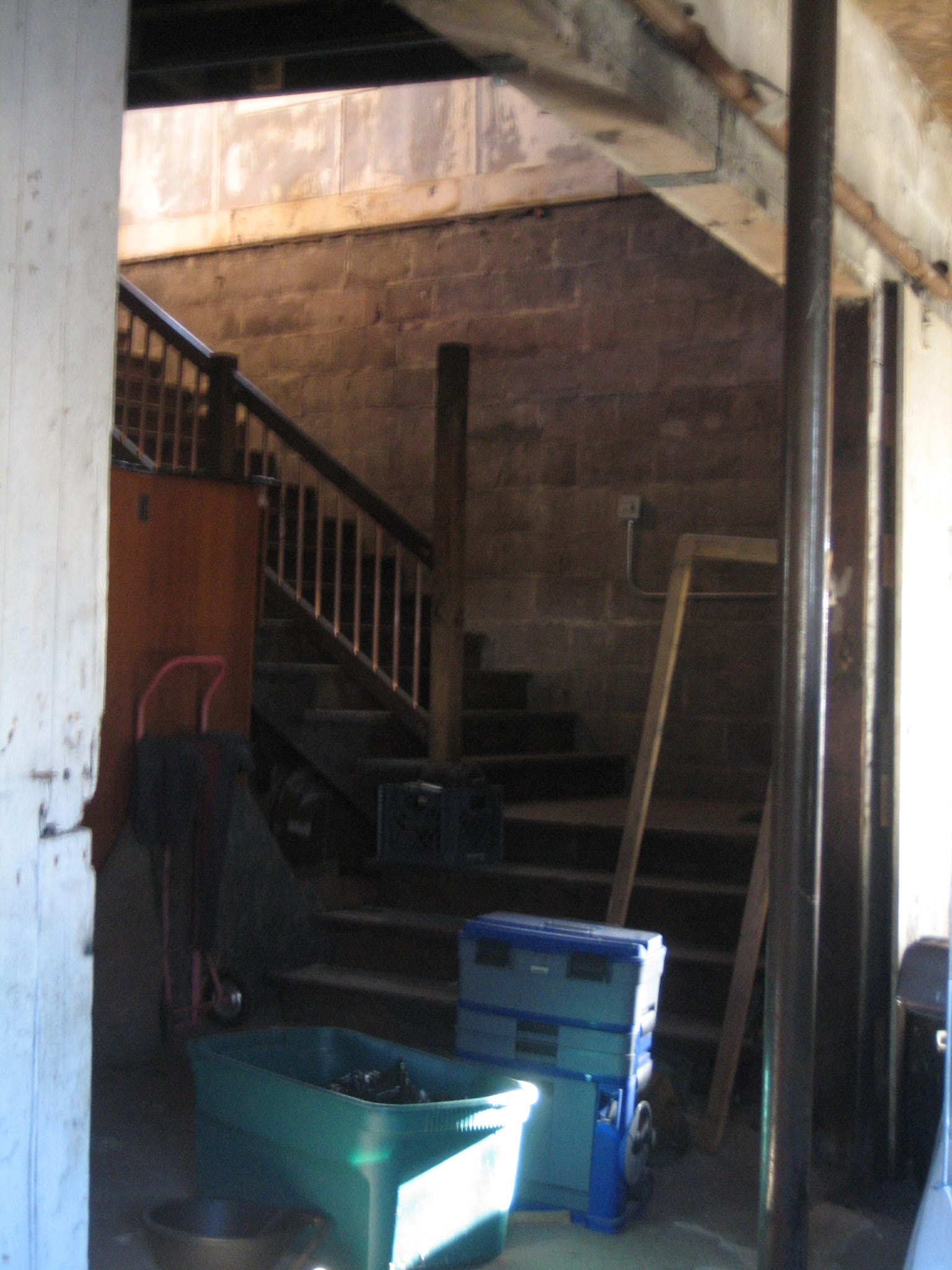
The interior stairwell, Ashelford Hall.

The club served the community in a variety of ways. It sponsored a popular Fourth of July celebration and picnic. From 1925 to the 1930s, the generator at Ashelford Hall supplied power to the key buildings in Esmond. The Men's Club then undertook a successful project in 1930s to bring electricity to Esmond, thus eliminating the need for the Ashelford Hall generator. The Esmond Men's Community Club disbanded on December 11, 1974, with four charter members still active in the club.

==== Entertainment ====
From the beginning, Ashelford Hall served as a community center and entertainment venue. During the 1920s, a community orchestra performed at the building for various community and Grange events. The orchestra disbanded in the 1930s but Ashelford Hall continued to host a variety of entertainment events in its first two decades, including Vaudeville shows, medicine shows, parties, showers and wedding receptions, with the second floor serving as a popular dance hall. Weekends would feature performances by local bands and orchestras.

==== South Grove Grange ====
South Grove Grange No. 1838 was organized in 1925 by several members of the Willowdale Grange in DeKalb County and F.A. Jones of Peoria, Illinois. The Grange meetings were held at Ashelford Hall. There the farmers who were members of the Grange would meet to discuss new farming techniques and the farming market as well as see new product demonstrations. In 1929 a juvenile Grange was organized. By the early 1930s the adult Grange had 72 members, DeKalb County's largest such group.
