= Rollo, Illinois =

- Unincorporated community
- Location within Illinois Location within the United States
- Coordinates: 41°40′23″N 88°53′10″W
- Country: United States
- State: Illinois
- County: DeKalb
- Elevation: 748 ft (228 m)

Population
  - Estimate (2023): 4
- Time zone: UTC-6 (Central (CST))
  - Summer (DST): UTC-5 (CDT)
- Area codes: 815 & 779
- GNIS feature ID: 422018

Rollo is an unincorporated community in DeKalb County, Illinois, United States, located 5 miles (8.0 km) east-southeast of Paw Paw.

== History ==
A post office called Rollo was established in 1886, and remained in operation until it was discontinued in 1922. The community was named after the Rollo Books by Jacob Abbott.
