= Sycamore, Illinois =

- City
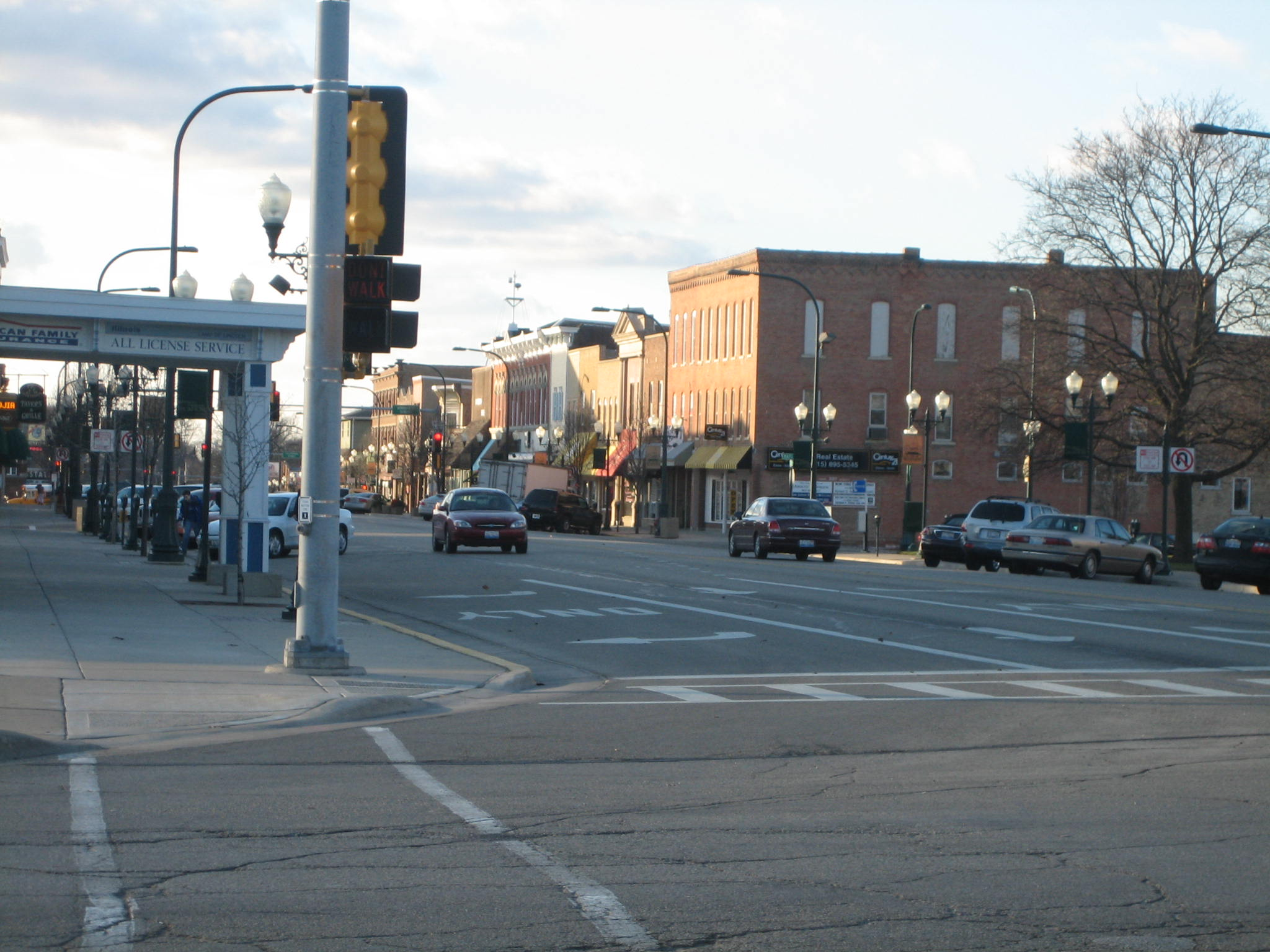
- Downtown Sycamore, looking west from the intersection of State and Main streets
- Interactive map of Sycamore, Illinois
- Location within Illinois Location within the United States
- Coordinates: 42°00′32″N 88°40′28″W
- Country: United States
- State: Illinois
- County: DeKalb
- Named for: Sycamore tree

Area
  - Total: 10.18 sq mi (26.36 km^{2})
  - Land: 10.12 sq mi (26.21 km^{2})
  - Water: 0.058 sq mi (0.15 km^{2})
- Elevation: 824 ft (251 m)

Population (2020)
  - Total: 18,577
  - Density: 1,835.6/sq mi (708.73/km^{2})
- Time zone: UTC−6 (CST)
  - Summer (DST): UTC−5 (CDT)
- ZIP code: 60178
- Area code: 815
- FIPS code: 17-74223
- GNIS feature ID: 2396018
- Website: www.cityofsycamore.com

Sycamore is a city in DeKalb County, Illinois, United States. It has a commercial district based and centered on Illinois Route 64. The population was 18,577 at the 2020 census, up from 17,419 at the 2010 census. Sycamore is the county seat of DeKalb County and was named after the sycamore tree.

== History ==
Sycamore Public Library (1905), a Carnegie library

=== Early settlement ===
The first European settlers to the Sycamore-area arrived in 1835 and concentrated themselves mostly north of the Kishwaukee River (the name of which means sycamore) and the present site of Sycamore. The original town was platted by a New Yorker named Christian Sharer. A mill was constructed and the Kishwaukee dammed but the town failed. By 1837, after some controversy, the location of county seat was settled in favor of Orange, Sycamore's original name, and the settlement moved to the present-day site of the city.

The present-day town site was platted by James Waterman and Evans Wharry in 1837 (the same year Chicago was founded). The first settler at the new site was Carlos Lattin, who preceded the town, having arrived in 1835. Lattin staked a claim that included most of the present west side of the city and erected his first cabin just north of downtown.

=== County seat location ===
Early in the city's history, it seemed that Sycamore might not be the location of the DeKalb County Courthouse: other towns were vying for the county seat title. A now-defunct town called Brush Point was the choice of a Dr. Henry Madden; and the Clerk of the Court Rufus Colton would have preferred Coltonville, where he made his home. Colton had set the first session of county court to be held at his home in Coltonville. In his attempt to make Coltonville the county seat, Colton decided to hold a new election for the status in 1837. Colton made sure that Coltonville would win the election by telling only the population of Coltonville about it. His political tactics were eventually cancelled by an act of the Illinois General Assembly, after the DeKalb County court intervened. When court convened the sheriff served a court order declaring Sycamore had built a Courthouse and that the Court session should be held there. Afterward, Coltonville eventually suffered the same fate as Brush Point and disappeared from the map. These events settled for a time the issue of where the courthouse and, in turn, the DeKalb County seat was going to be located.

In 1903, as the county prepared to construct a new courthouse, the debate over county seat was reignited. This time, it was the city of DeKalb that sought to wrest the title of county seat away from Sycamore. Two of DeKalb's most prominent citizens, Jacob Haish and Isaac L. Ellwood, each promised to donate $20,000 to help absorb some of the new building's cost. The city of Sycamore responded, raising funds of their own, and after some back and forth and legal wrangling, the issue was settled in Sycamore's favor.

=== Later settlement ===
Following the end of the second county seat controversy, in 1839, the first DeKalb County Courthouse was built in the city, as well as Sycamore's first hotel. A year later the settlement consisted of 12 houses, which increased to 18 by 1844. Sycamore then began an era of steady growth marked by population increases in 1848 to 262, 1849 to 320, 1850 to 390, 1851 to 435. The Sycamore and Cortland Railroad arrived in the late 1850s and a station was erected in Sycamore. Sycamore was home to 41 commercial and industrial business by 1855. In 1858, Sycamore was incorporated as a village. Following the American Civil War the railroad began to assist Sycamore's growth and the settlement was incorporated as a city in 1869.

=== Maria Ridulph murder ===
Sycamore is the location of a notable cold case, the 1957 abduction and murder of 7-year-old Maria Ridulph. On the evening of December 3, 1957, Maria disappeared while playing outside her family's Sycamore home. She was last seen by her playmate Kathy Chapman (née Sigman) with a young man who called himself "Johnny" and had approached the girls offering them piggyback rides. A search and investigation by local and state police and the FBI failed to locate either Maria or "Johnny", and the following April, Maria's body was found in a field approximately 100 miles from Sycamore. The case remained unsolved for over 50 years until in 2011, Jack Daniel McCullough, a former neighbor of the Ridulphs, was arrested and convicted of kidnapping and murdering Maria. The case received national news coverage as the oldest cold case in US history to result in a conviction. However, in April 2016, McCullough's conviction was overturned and he was released from prison after a post-conviction review of the evidence indicated that he could not have committed the crime.

=== 2010 earthquake ===
On the morning of February 10, 2010 at 3:59 a.m., Sycamore was near the epicenter of an earthquake. The shock had a moment magnitude of 3.8 and a maximum Mercalli intensity of IV (Light). It was felt 133 mi (214 km) away in Madison, Wisconsin. When the quake was first reported, it was thought Sycamore was the epicenter. However, revised data from the USGS determined the epicenter to be closer to Virgil. This was the first earthquake in Northern Illinois since an M4.2 (intensity V (Moderate)) event in 2004.

== Geography ==
Sycamore is located along Illinois Route 64 (State Street in Sycamore) about 35 miles (56 km) southeast of Rockford and 55 miles (89 km) west-northwest of Chicago. It is along the south bank of the East Branch of the South Branch Kishwaukee River in DeKalb County.

According to the 2021 census gazetteer files, Sycamore has a total area of 10.18 square miles (26.37 km^{2}), of which 10.12 square miles (26.21 km^{2}) (or 99.43%) is land and 0.06 square miles (0.16 km^{2}) (or 0.57%) is water. The terrain in Sycamore and the surrounding area is gently rolling and contains rich soil which was originally heavily forested.

=== Cityscape ===
The commercial district of Sycamore is based on Illinois Route 64, and stretches about a mile down starting from the intersection of route 64 with Illinois Route 23 and ending at Center Cross Road. The district is composed of two-story shops, a bank, small movie theater, and former Midwest Museum of Natural History. The town also has the county courthouse, built in 1904, of limestone.

== Demographics ==
Historical population
Census	Pop.	Note	%±
1850	338		—
1860	1,271		276.0%
1870	1,967		54.8%
1880	3,028		53.9%
1890	2,987		−1.4%
1900	3,653		22.3%
1910	3,926		7.5%
1920	3,602		−8.3%
1930	4,021		11.6%
1940	4,702		16.9%
1950	5,912		25.7%
1960	6,961		17.7%
1970	7,843		12.7%
1980	9,219		17.5%
1990	9,708		5.3%
2000	12,020		23.8%
2010	17,519		45.7%
2020	18,577		6.0%
U.S. Decennial Census

=== Racial and ethnic composition ===
Sycamore city, Illinois – Racial and ethnic composition Note: the US Census treats Hispanic/Latino as an ethnic category. This table excludes Latinos from the racial categories and assigns them to a separate category. Hispanics/Latinos may be of any race.
Race / Ethnicity (NH = Non-Hispanic)	Pop 2000	Pop 2010	Pop 2020	% 2000	% 2010	% 2020
White alone (NH)	10,937	15,267	15,002	90.99%	87.15%	80.76%
Black or African American alone (NH)	323	493	573	2.69%	2.81%	3.08%
Native American or Alaska Native alone (NH)	24	14	19	0.20%	0.08%	0.10%
Asian alone (NH)	96	254	413	0.80%	1.45%	2.22%
Native Hawaiian or Pacific Islander alone (NH)	2	2	4	0.02%	0.01%	0.02%
Other race alone (NH)	20	21	60	0.17%	0.12%	0.32%
Mixed race or Multiracial (NH)	105	239	777	0.87%	1.36%	4.18%
Hispanic or Latino (any race)	513	1,229	1,729	4.27%	7.02%	9.31%
Total	12,020	17,519	18,577	100.00%	100.00%	100.00%

=== 2020 census ===
As of the 2020 census, Sycamore had a population of 18,577 and 7,517 households; there were 4,602 families residing in the city, and the population density was 1,825.21 inhabitants per square mile (704.72/km^{2}). The median age was 38.4 years. 24.5% of residents were under the age of 18 and 15.5% of residents were 65 years of age or older. For every 100 females there were 93.3 males, and for every 100 females age 18 and over there were 90.9 males age 18 and over.

98.0% of residents lived in urban areas, while 2.0% lived in rural areas.

There were 7,517 households in Sycamore, of which 33.1% had children under the age of 18 living in them. Of all households, 50.4% were married-couple households, 16.5% were households with a male householder and no spouse or partner present, and 26.1% were households with a female householder and no spouse or partner present. About 28.9% of all households were made up of individuals and 11.5% had someone living alone who was 65 years of age or older.

There were 7,792 housing units, of which 3.5% were vacant; the average density was 765.57 per square mile (295.59/km^{2}). The homeowner vacancy rate was 1.1% and the rental vacancy rate was 4.1%.

Racial composition as of the 2020 census
Race	Number	Percent
White	15,424	83.0%
Black or African American	594	3.2%
American Indian and Alaska Native	86	0.5%
Asian	418	2.3%
Native Hawaiian and Other Pacific Islander	4	0.0%
Some other race	651	3.5%
Two or more races	1,400	7.5%

== Economy ==
Sycamore has never had a large manufacturing or industrial sector. Among Sycamore's early industries were Marsh Harvester Manufacturing, R. Ellwood Manufacturing, and Sycamore Preserve Works. Marsh Harvester was established in 1859, Ellwood in 1875 and the preserve works in 1891. R. Ellwood Manufacturing relocated to DeKalb in 1891.

Today, Ideal Industries is a privately owned manufacturer based in Sycamore.

== Arts and culture ==
=== Tourism ===
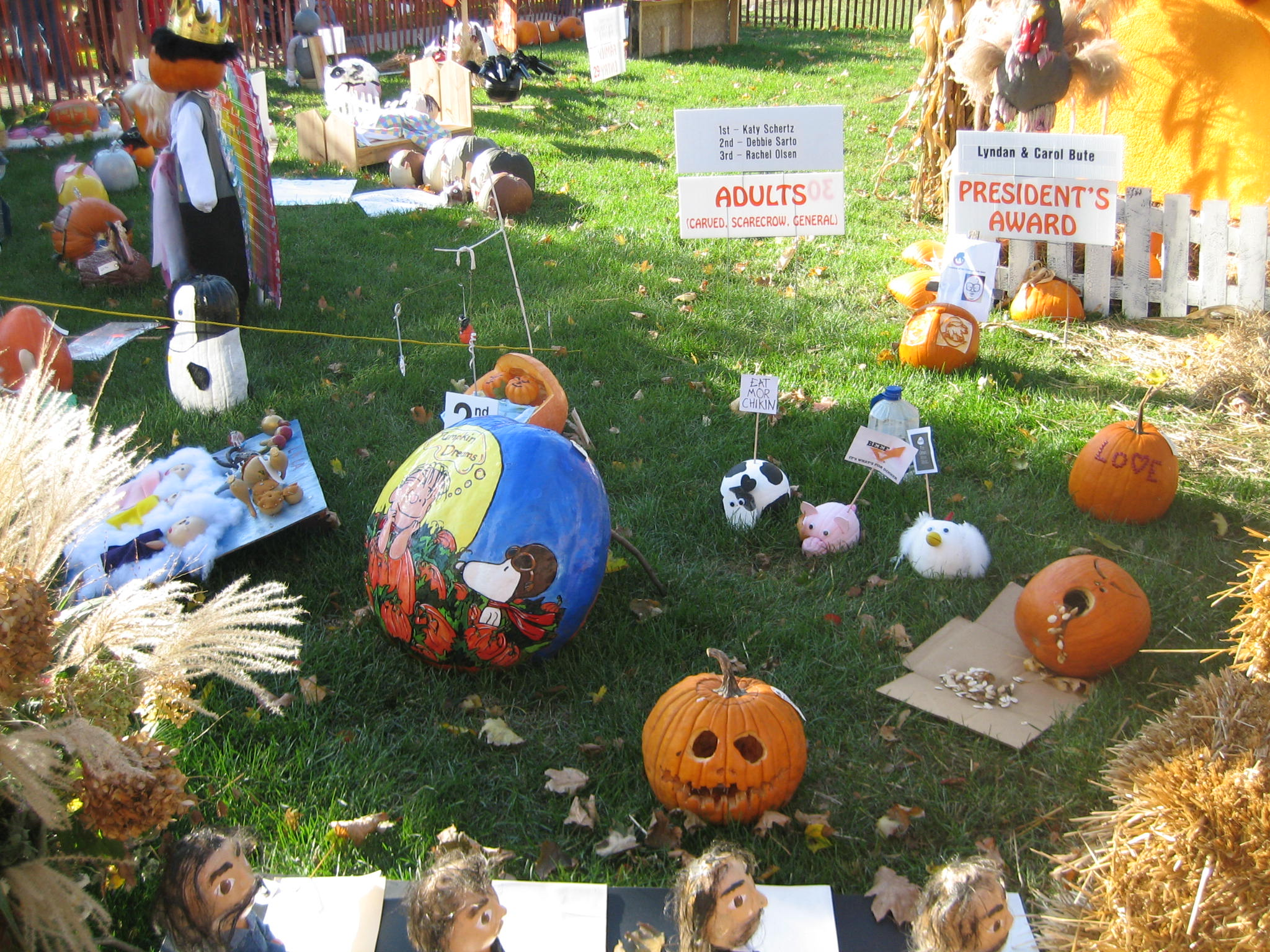
The DeKalb County Courthouse lawn becomes a colorful display of pumpkins during the annual Sycamore Pumpkin Festival.

Sycamore is home to the annual Sycamore Pumpkin Festival, a pumpkin festival established in 1962 when local resident Wally Thurow began displaying pumpkins on his front lawn. The festival features many activities, a carnival, and a parade. The lawn of the DeKalb County Courthouse is the center of the event and includes a display of decorated and carved pumpkins. The event attracts thousands to Sycamore from locations throughout northern Illinois, the Midwest, and the broader United States.

The city is also home to the Sycamore Historic District, an architecturally interesting area containing over 200 individual properties. The district was established in 1978 when it was added to the National Register of Historic Places. The area is bounded in an irregular pattern along Main and Somonauk Streets but contains portions of several other streets and includes much of the downtown commercial district and residential areas north and south of downtown. During the summer, the Sycamore Historical Society offers guided walking tours with a local historian.

Sycamore is also home to the former Midwest Museum of Natural History, which featured a varied taxidermy collection and closed in February 2020.

The Great Western Trail passes through town.

== Historic sites ==
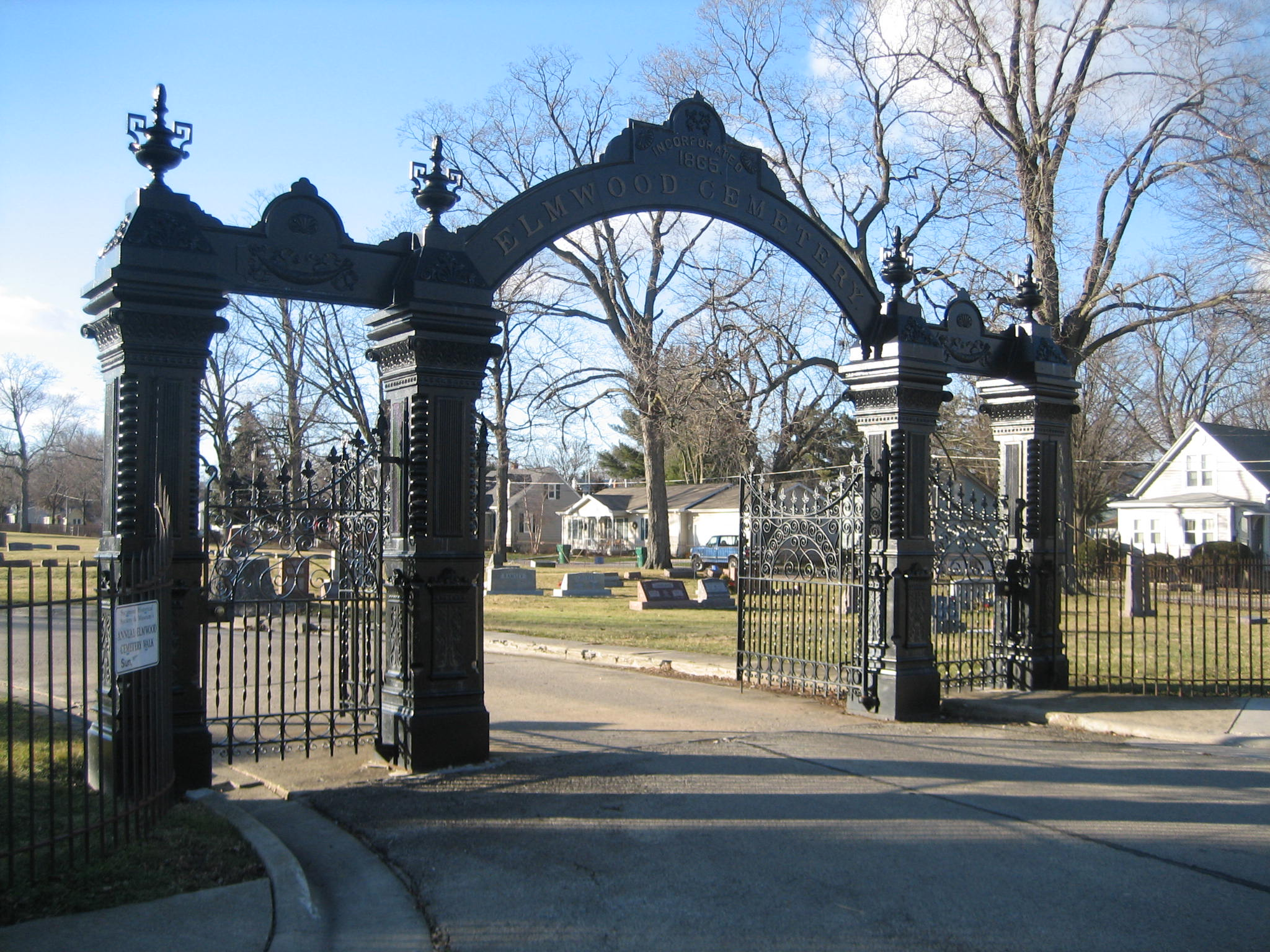
Elmwood Cemetery Gates (1865)

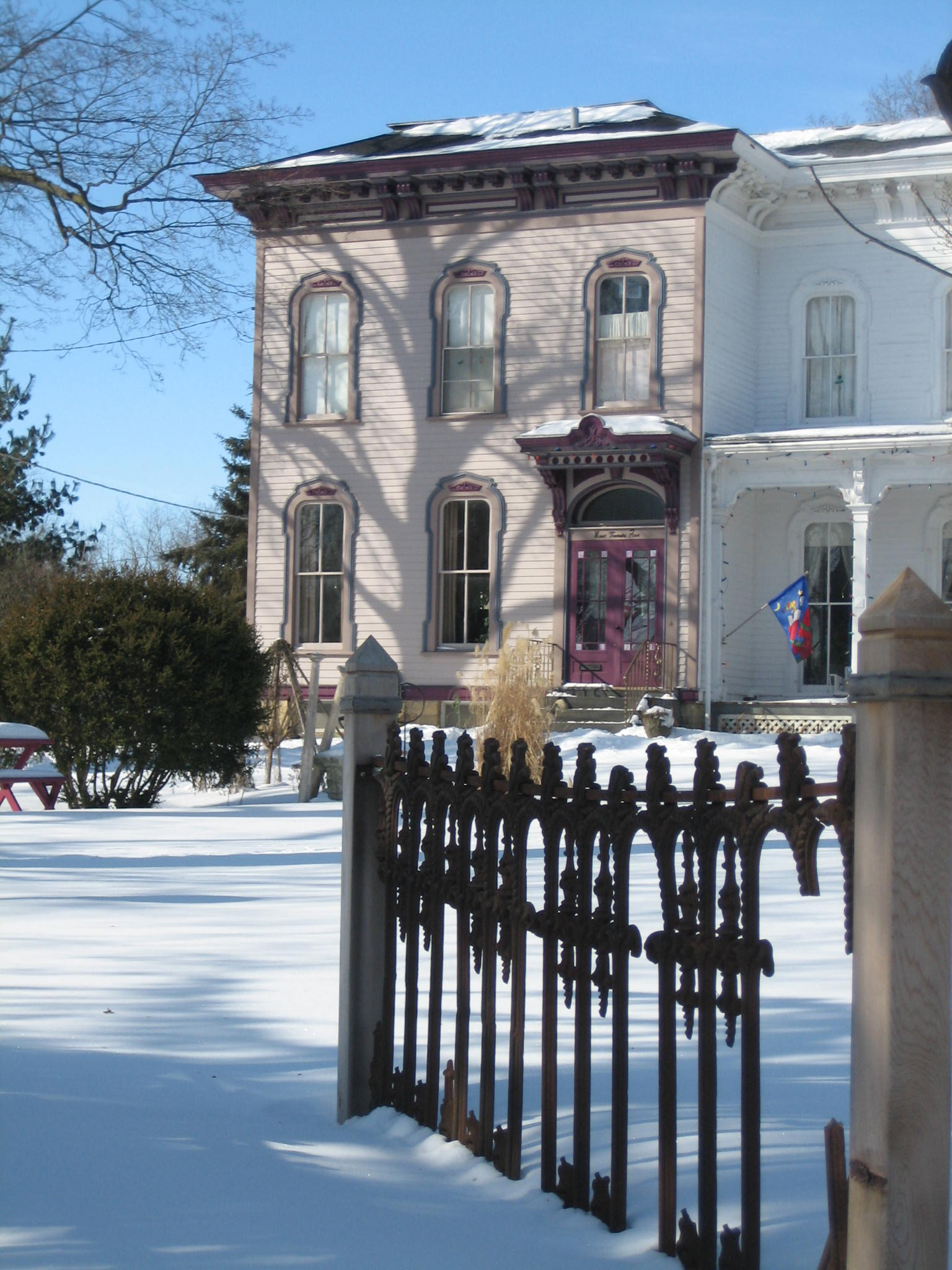
David DeGraff House (1867) in the Sycamore Historic District

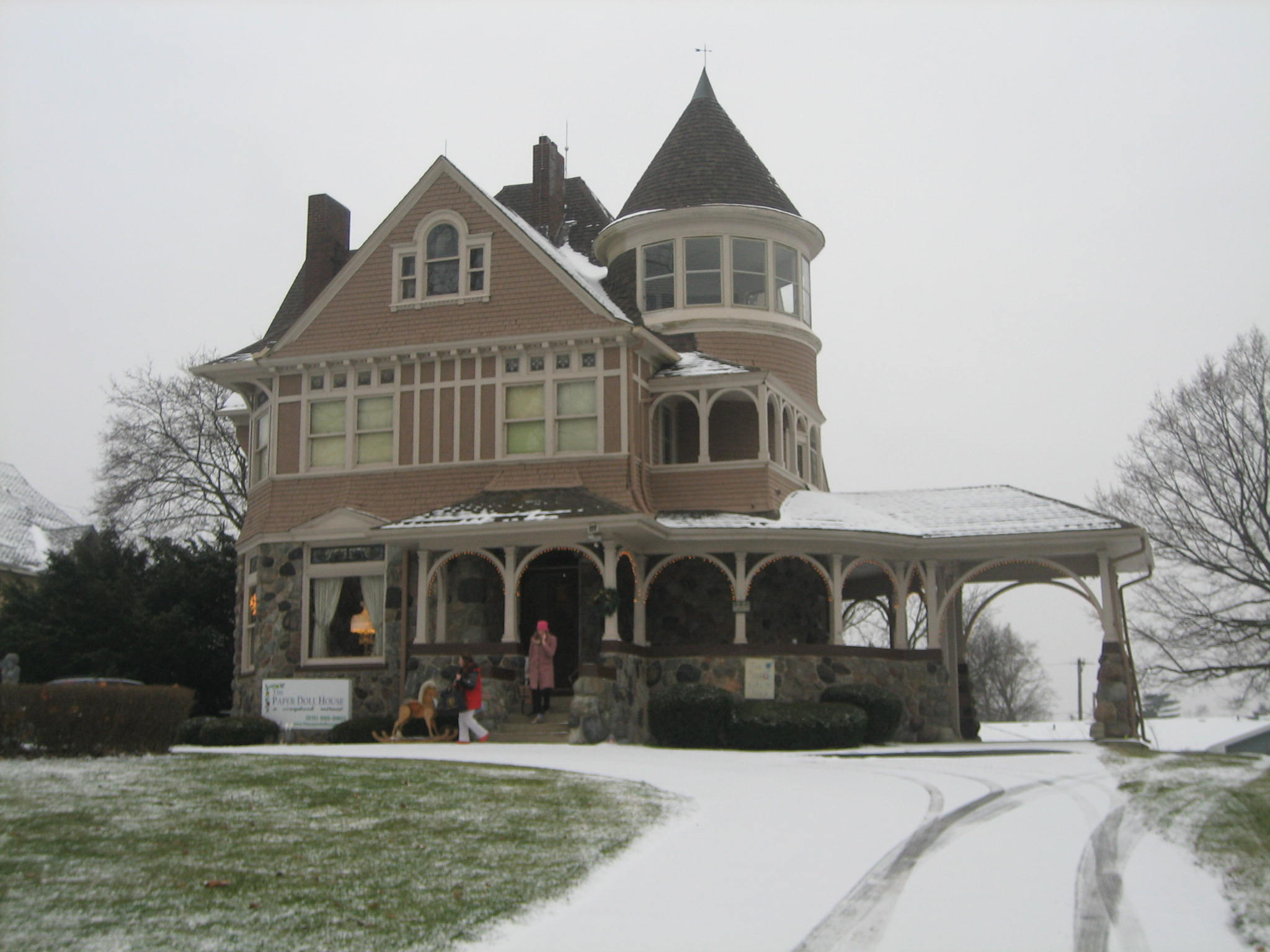
Frederick B. Townsend House bed and breakfast (1892)

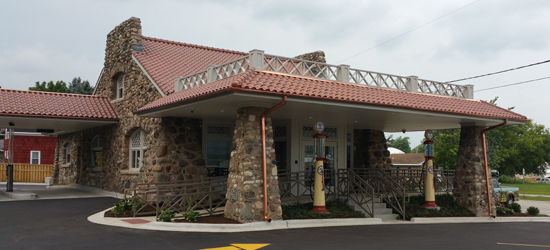
Frederick Townsend Garage (1905)

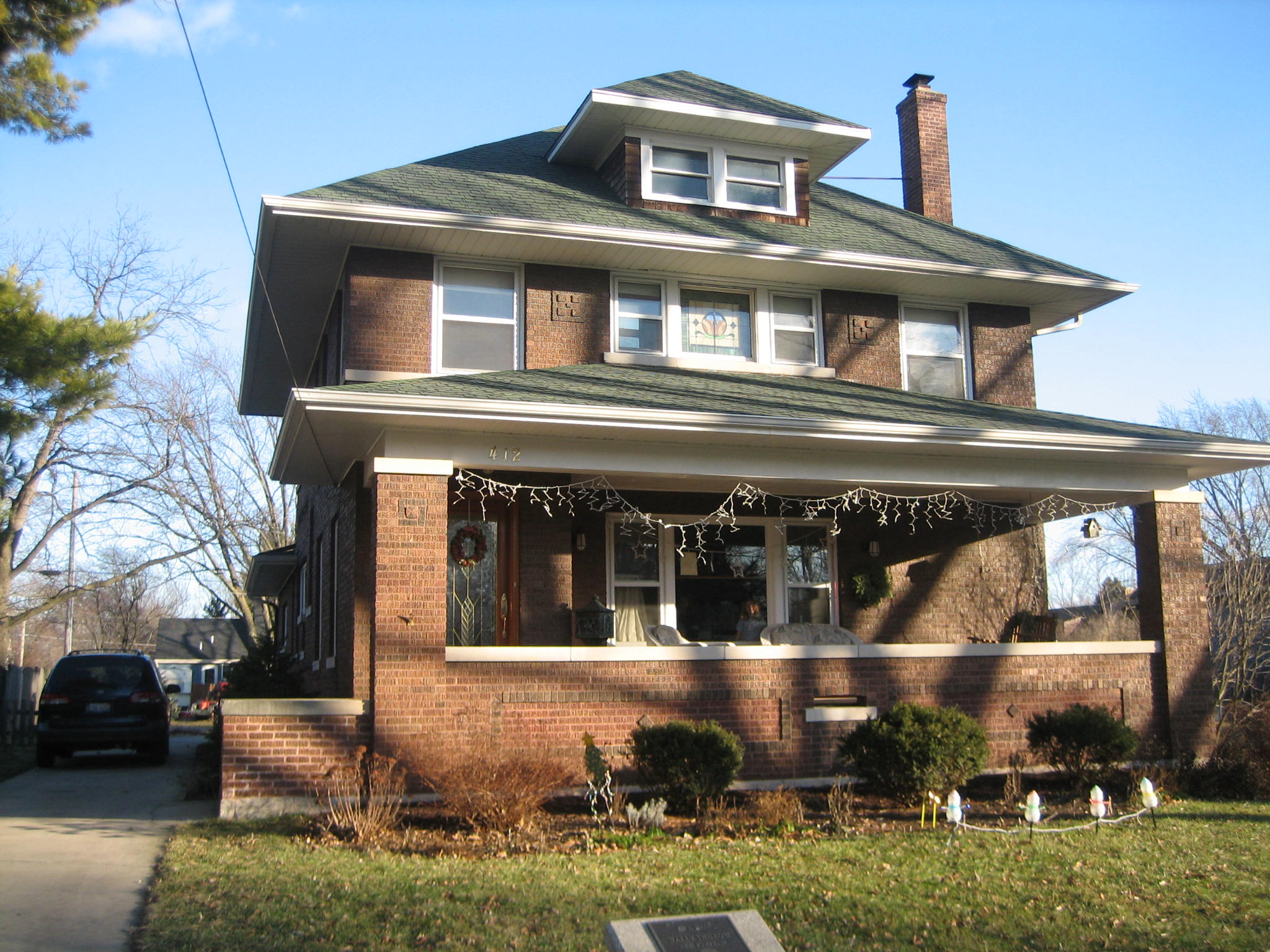
Prairie style Wally Thurow House (1917)

== Government ==
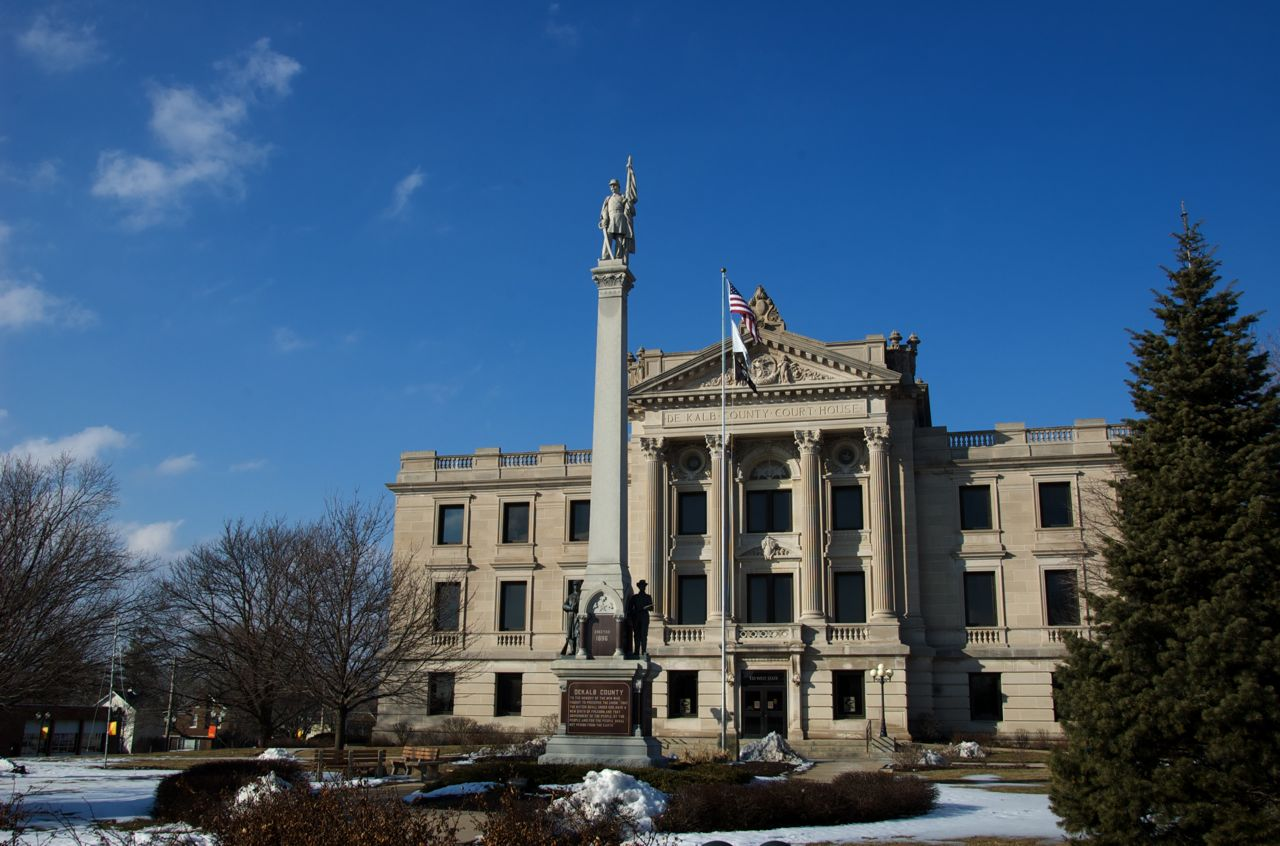
DeKalb County Courthouse (1905) in downtown Sycamore

Sycamore features a Council-Manager government. Policy is developed by an elected City Council and then implemented by an appointed professional City Manager. The Sycamore City Council consists of a Mayor elected at-large and eight Aldermen representing one of four wards (two per ward). The Mayor and Aldermen serve four year terms, with one Alderman from each ward being elected every two years. Sycamore's current mayor is Steve Braser.

== Education ==
Public schooling began in Sycamore as early as 1839, with classes held in the first DeKalb County Courthouse, a log building across the street from the courthouse's current location. The city's first school building was built in 1853. Current public education needs in Sycamore are provided by Sycamore Community Unit School District 427. The current Superintendent of Sycamore School District is Nick Reineck. The district operates Sycamore High School, Sycamore Middle School, and five elementary schools. The newest elementary school, North Grove, opened in 2009 was built for access by the nearby subdivision.

== Transportation ==
DeKalb Public Transit provides bus service on Routes 17, 18, 21 and 21T connecting Sycamore to downtown DeKalb and other destinations. The Chicago & North Western line between Belvedere and Spring Valley and the Chicago Great Western line between Chicago and Omaha served Sycamore. Both lines have since been abandoned.

== Notable people ==
- David Boies, attorney, born in Sycamore
- Bryan Carter, musician, recipient of the Grammy and Tony Award.
- Adam C. Cliffe, United States court judge
- Erica Coulibaly, USA rugby union player
- Reuben Ellwood Republican U.S. Representative from Illinois. (d.1885)
- William J. Fulton, Chief Justice of the Illinois Supreme Court, lived in Sycamore
- Jay Henigan, plumber and CIA contractor killed in Afghanistan
- Mark Johnston, cornerback for Houston Oilers
- George McCaskey, Chicago Bears chairman.
- Ben Niemann, linebacker for NFL's Tennessee Titans
- Nick Niemann, linebacker for the Los Angeles Chargers.
- Maria Ridulph (1950–1957), child murder victim
- Alvah Sabin, politician, congressman, lived in Sycamore
- Frederick B. Townsend, judge, mayor of Sycamore
- Floyd K. Whittemore, Illinois state treasurer
- David A. Wirsling, Illinois representative and farmer, born in Sycamore

== See also ==
- Chicago and Northwestern Depot
- List of properties (Sycamore Historic District)
- Houses in Sycamore Historic District
- Adolphus W. Brower House
- William W. Marsh House
