= Commercial buildings in Sycamore Historic District =

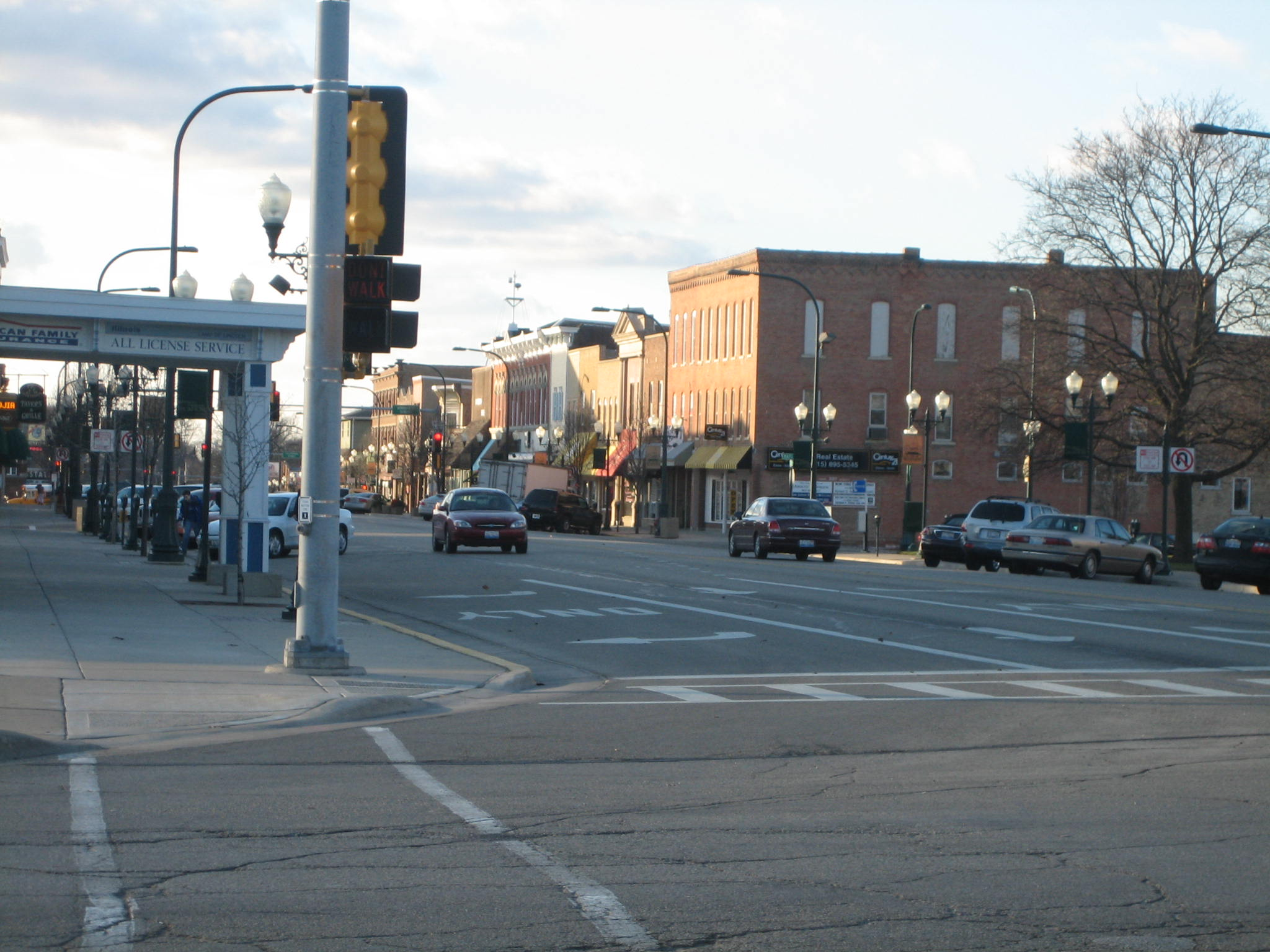
A view of downtown Sycamore, toward the George's Block and the Citizens National Bank Building

The commercial buildings in the Sycamore Historic District, located in Sycamore, Illinois, United States, are mostly located in and around the city's downtown. The largest concentration of commercial contributing properties to the historic district are found along Illinois Route 64 as it passes through Sycamore. They include several buildings known as "blocks" which can consist of more than one adjacent and attached structure, as is the case with the Waterman Block, one of the Sycamore commercial buildings.

== 156 W. State Street ==
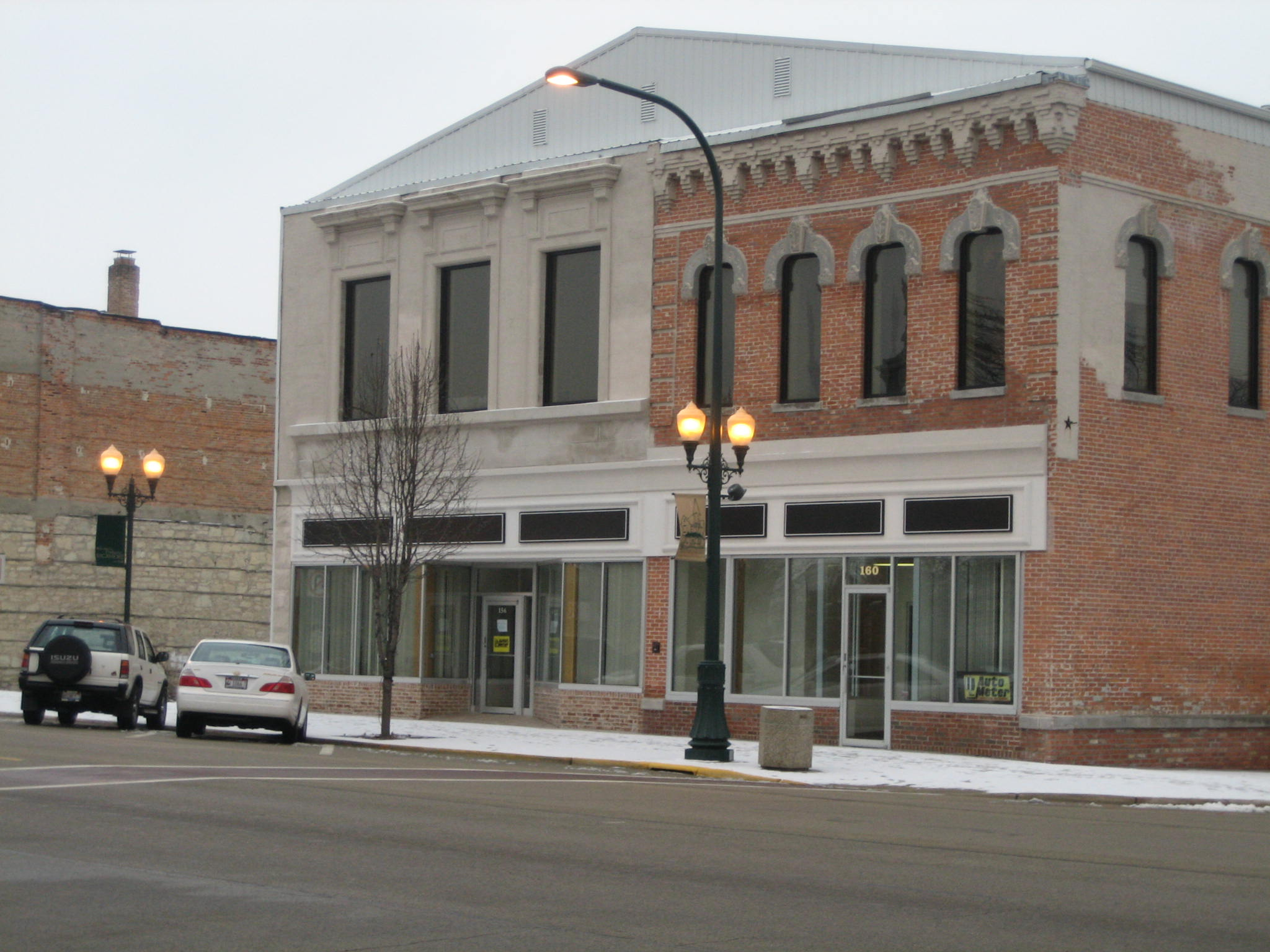
156. W. State St., left; Townsend Building, right

156 W. State Street is the address of a historic building in downtown Sycamore, Illinois. It is adjacent to the equally historic Townsend Building and one of 187 contributing properties to the Sycamore Historic District. The district was designated and added to the National Register of Historic Places in 1978. Most of the original building at the location is no longer intact and has since been replaced or remodeled. Its top floor was, however, finished in a gray material similar to that which covers the facade today. The structure originally had a flat roof.

== Citizens National Bank Building ==
The Citizens National Bank Building is a historic commercial building in downtown Sycamore, Illinois, it is part of the Sycamore Historic District. The building was erected around 1910, most likely specifically for a bank. The building's time as a bank proved to be short-lived and the Citizens National Bank shut it doors by 1926. Today the building houses a restaurant. It stands close to the George's Block and across the street from the Waterman Block and the National Bank & Trust Co. Building, all significant structures within the historic district.

== Court Building ==
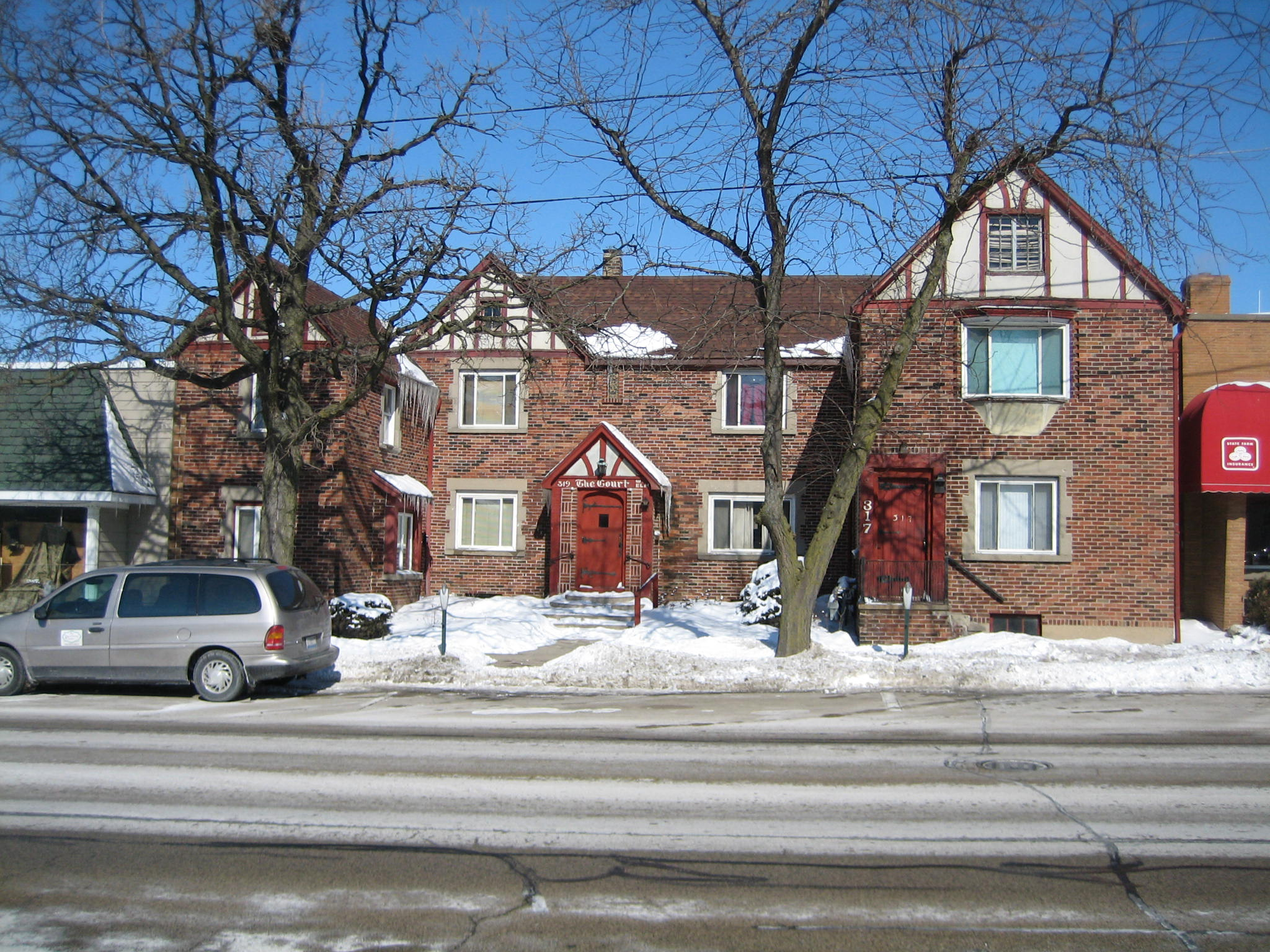
The Court Building

The Court Building, or simply The Court, is a structure located on Sycamore's Elm Street and used mostly as an apartment building. The Tudor Revival Court Building is considered a contributing property to the integrity of the district by the National Register of Historic Places, a list the district joined in May 1978. The Court Building, a free standing structure near downtown Sycamore, is designed in a Tudor Revival motif.

== Daniel Pierce Block ==
The Daniel Pierce Block or Daniel Pierce Building is located in downtown Sycamore, Illinois, along Illinois Route 64 (State Street). The building is a contributing member of the Sycamore Historic District. It is directly across the street from another notable structure in the district, the National Bank & Trust Co. Building. Today the building is known as Sycamore Center, the Sycamore City Council currently meets in the structure.

== National Bank & Trust Company Building ==
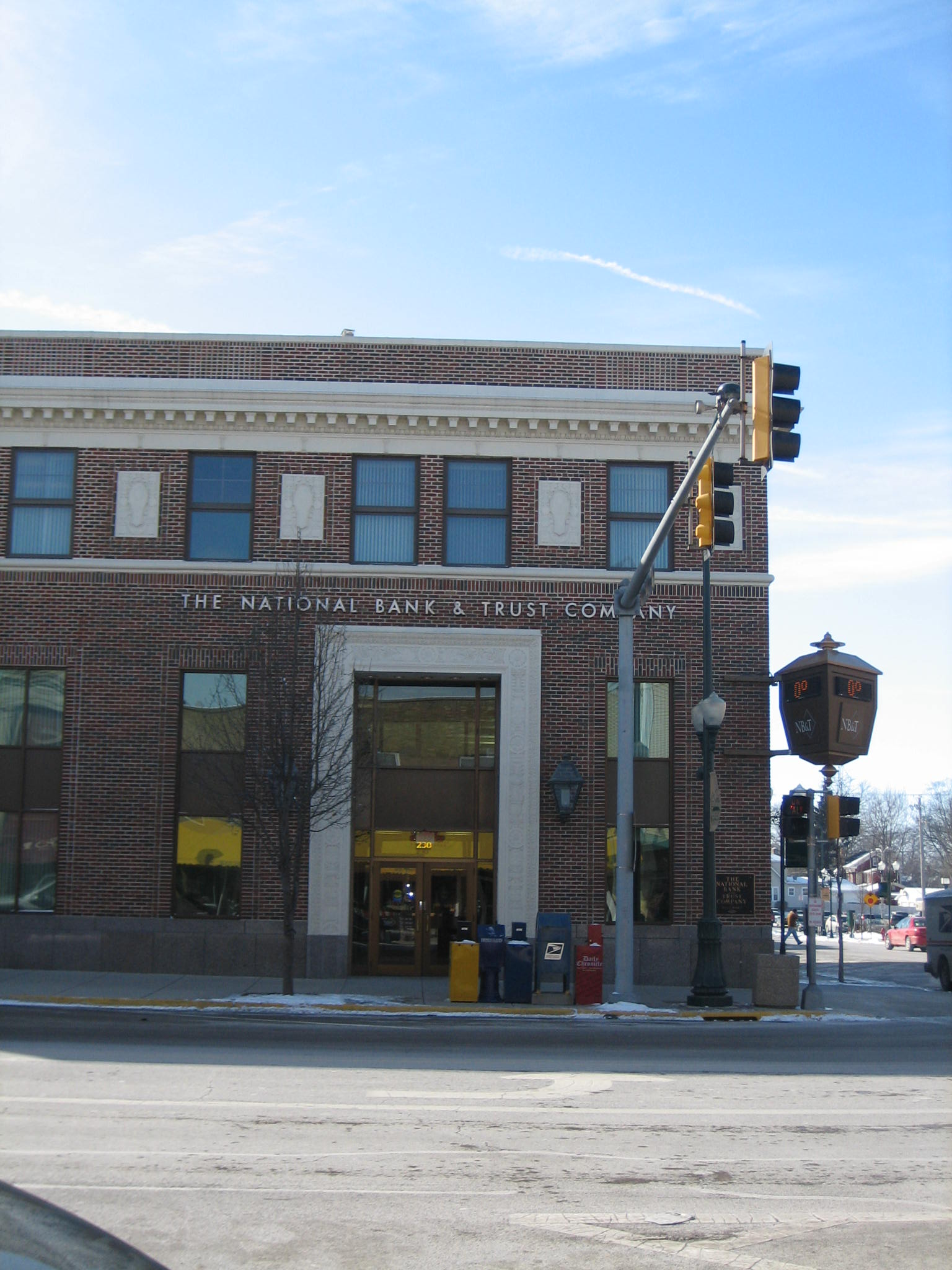
National Bank & Trust Co. Building

The National Bank & Trust Company Building is located on Illinois Route 64 as it passes through historic downtown Sycamore, Illinois. The building was constructed in 1925 and designed by the Chicago architecture firm of Weary & Alford Company. The bank was founded in 1867 under the name "Daniel Pierce & Co."

== Other structures ==
The 1906 Frederick Townsend Garage sits at the base of a small incline overlooked by the large Queen Anne style Townsend House. Last a gas station, the stone building has been used by a number of restaurants since then.

Downtown, the George's Block, once known as the James Block, is another 19th Century structure located in Sycamore, Illinois, along Illinois Route 64 (State Street) as it passes through the DeKalb County seat. The building dates from 1857 when it was owned by Daniel P. James but by the 1860s the building has become known as George's Block. The third floor of the George's Block, not in use as of 2007, contained a lecture hall where a wide variety of speakers from around the United States would come for presentations. In the first year the building existed such famous men as Horace Greeley, Charles Sumner and Bayard Taylor spoke there.

== Townsend Building ==
The Sycamore, Illinois Townsend Building is another contributing property within the Sycamore Historic District. The district is located in and around downtown Sycamore. The Townsend Building is adjacent to, (connected to as well), to the historic building at 156 W. State St. The building was constructed around the turn of the 20th century and is probably the more architecturally interesting of the two adjacent structures.

== Waterman Block ==
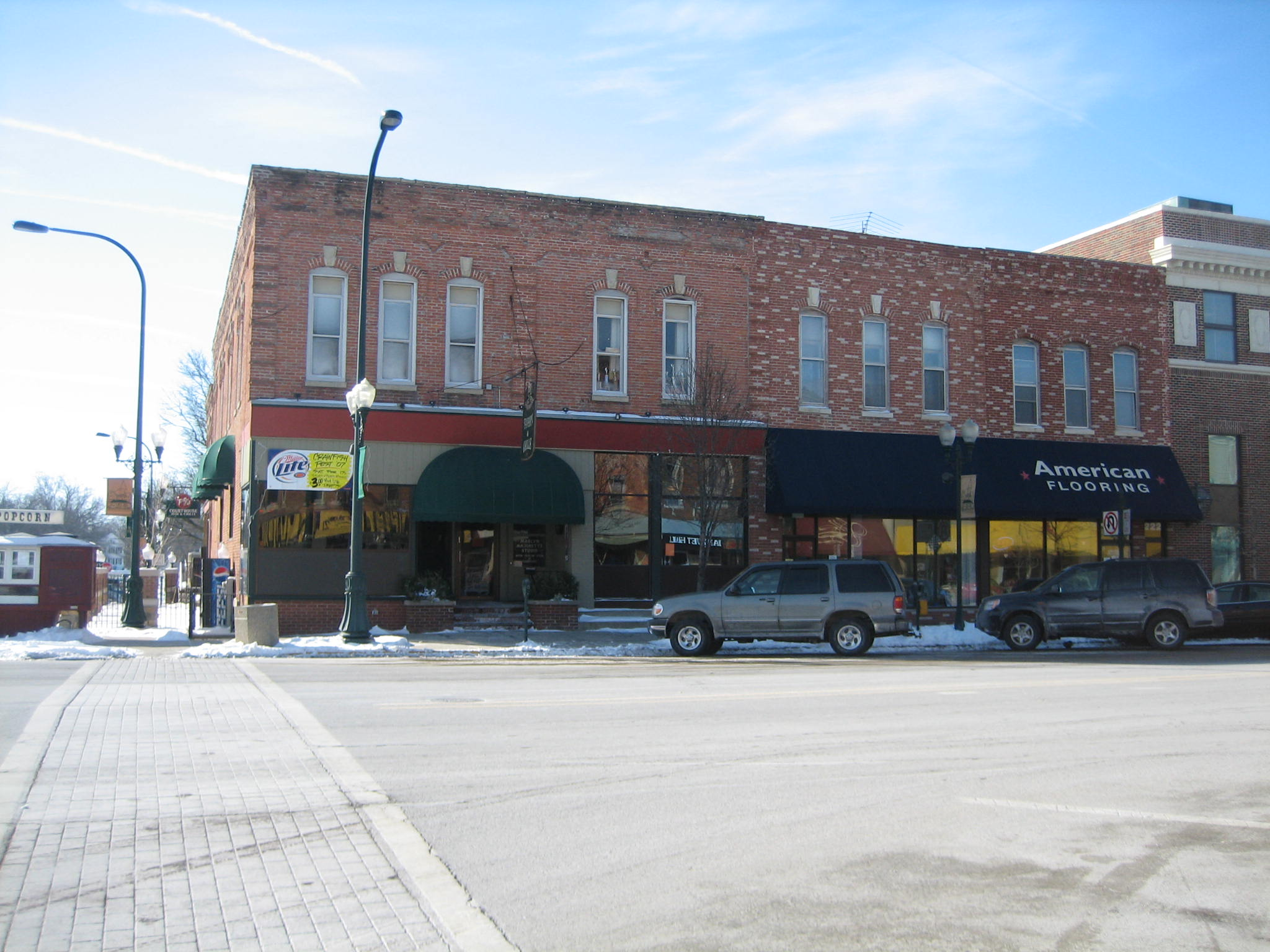
Waterman Block

The Waterman Block is also located along Illinois Route 64 as it passes through the DeKalb County, Illinois city of Sycamore. The three structures that make up the Waterman Block are the oldest on State Street, Illinois 64. The buildings were constructed in sometime around 1870 by Sycamore merchant James Waterman.

== See also ==
- Churches in Sycamore Historic District
- Houses in Sycamore Historic District
- Old Sycamore Hospital
