= Houses in Sycamore Historic District =

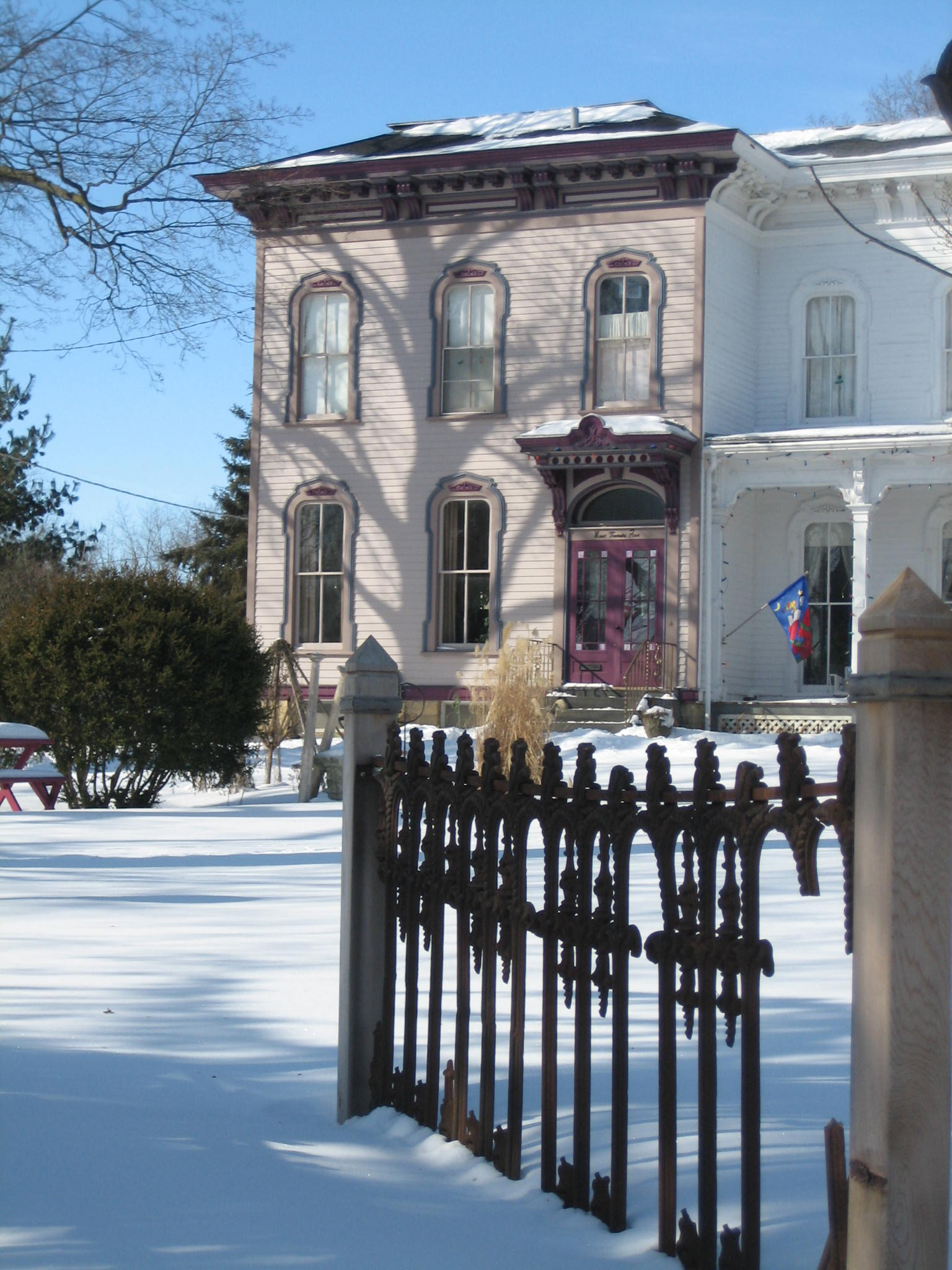
David DeGraff House

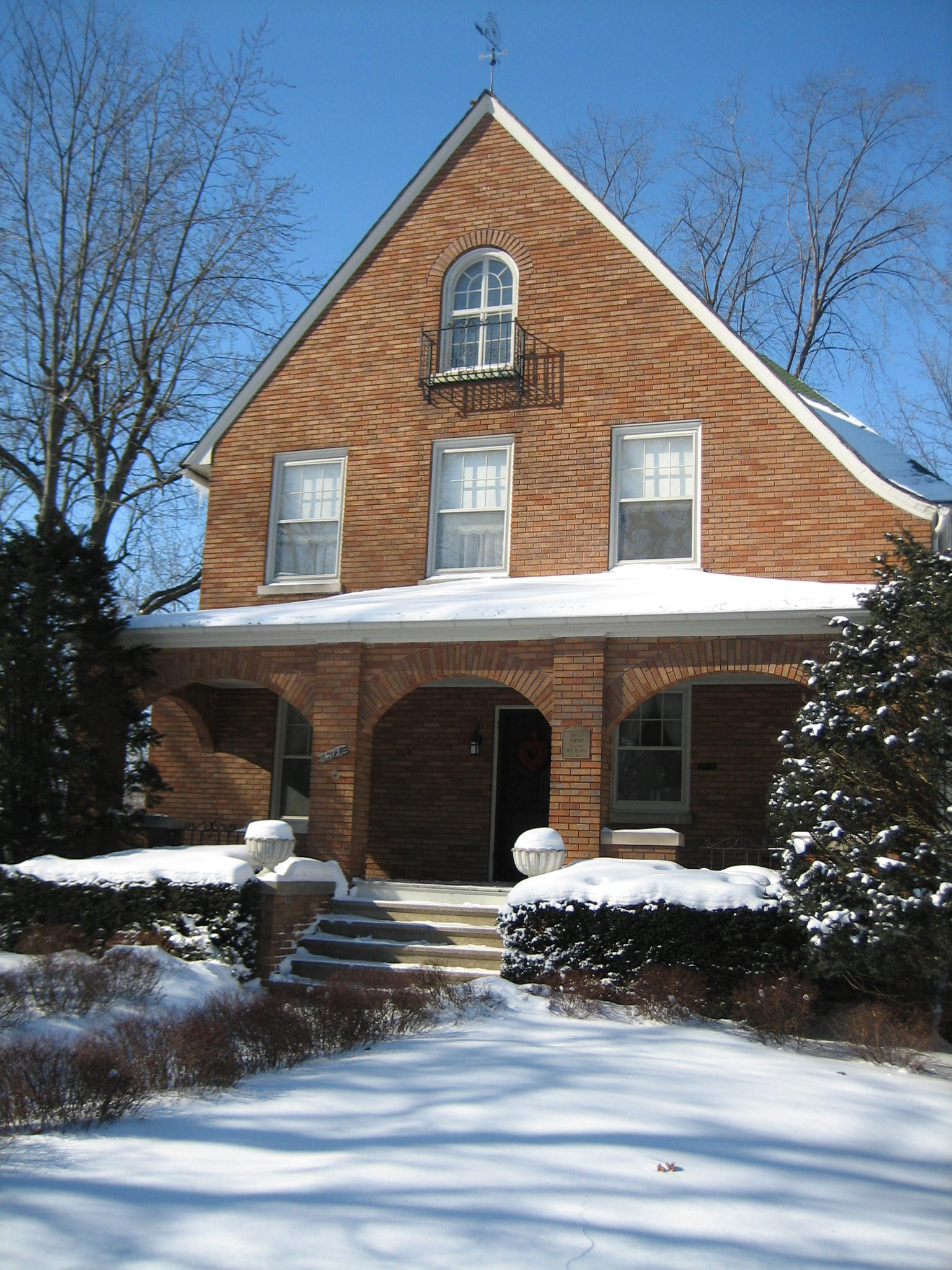
Floyd E. Brower House

The houses in the Sycamore Historic District, in Sycamore, Illinois, United States, cross a variety of architectural styles and span from the 1830s to the early 20th century. There are 187 contributing properties within the historic district, 75% of the districts buildings. Many of the homes are associated with early Sycamore residents, usually prominent business leaders or politicians. Houses within the district are known by, either their street address or by a name associated with a prominent owner or builder. For most of the houses, the latter is true.

== Numbered Houses ==
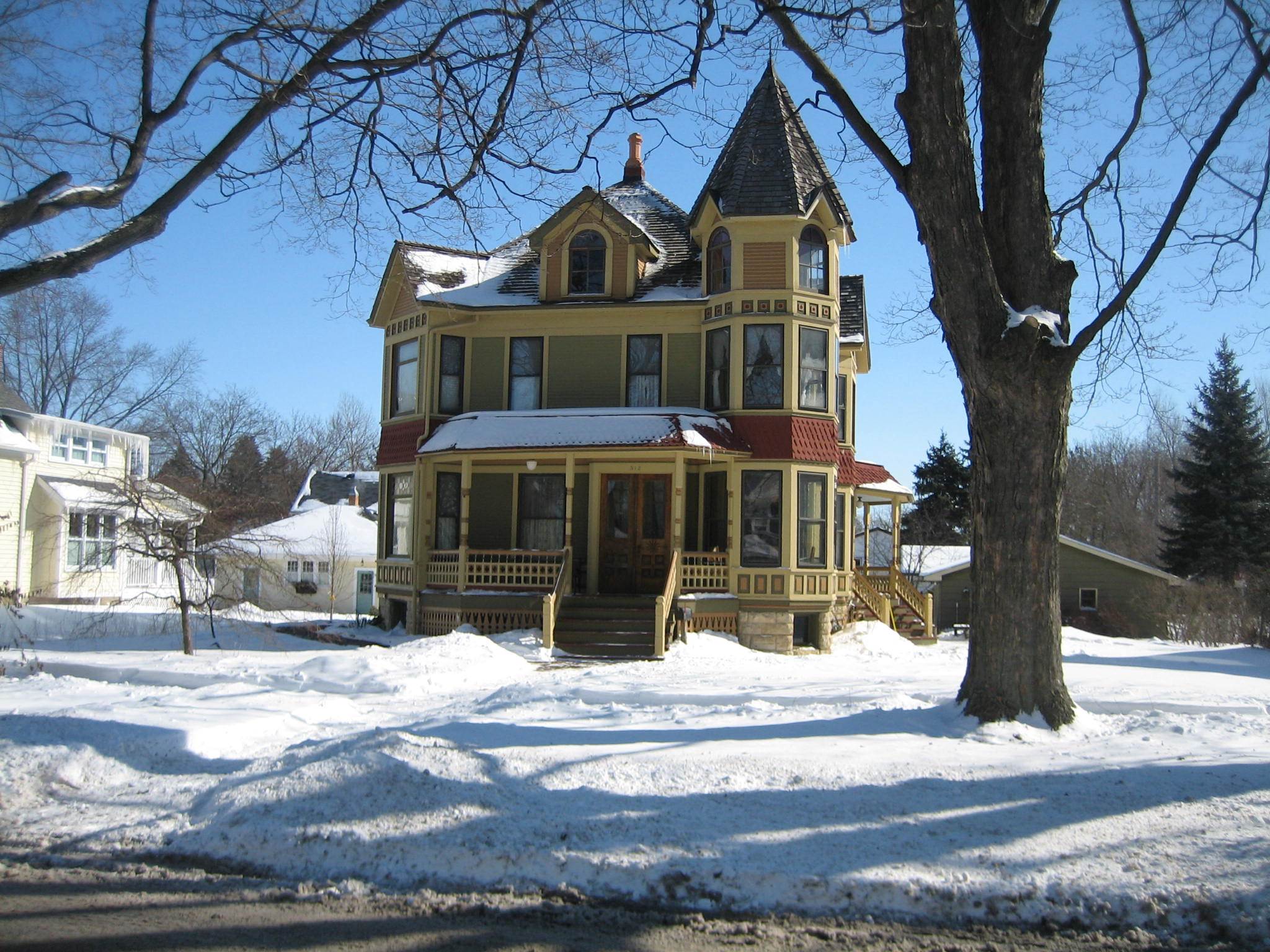
Queen Anne home at 512 S. Main Street

A full 75% of the districts buildings are listed as contributing properties. Many of these include homes within the boundaries of the district that are architecturally or historically significant but are commonly known only by their street address.

=== Ottawa and Maple Streets ===
Two of the districts contributing homes are found along Ottawa Street. Both homes are nameless and stand next door to each other, one is at 124 and the other is at 134. Along Maple Street the Italianate home at 202 is also listed as a contributing property, it is known only by its address.

=== Main and High Streets ===
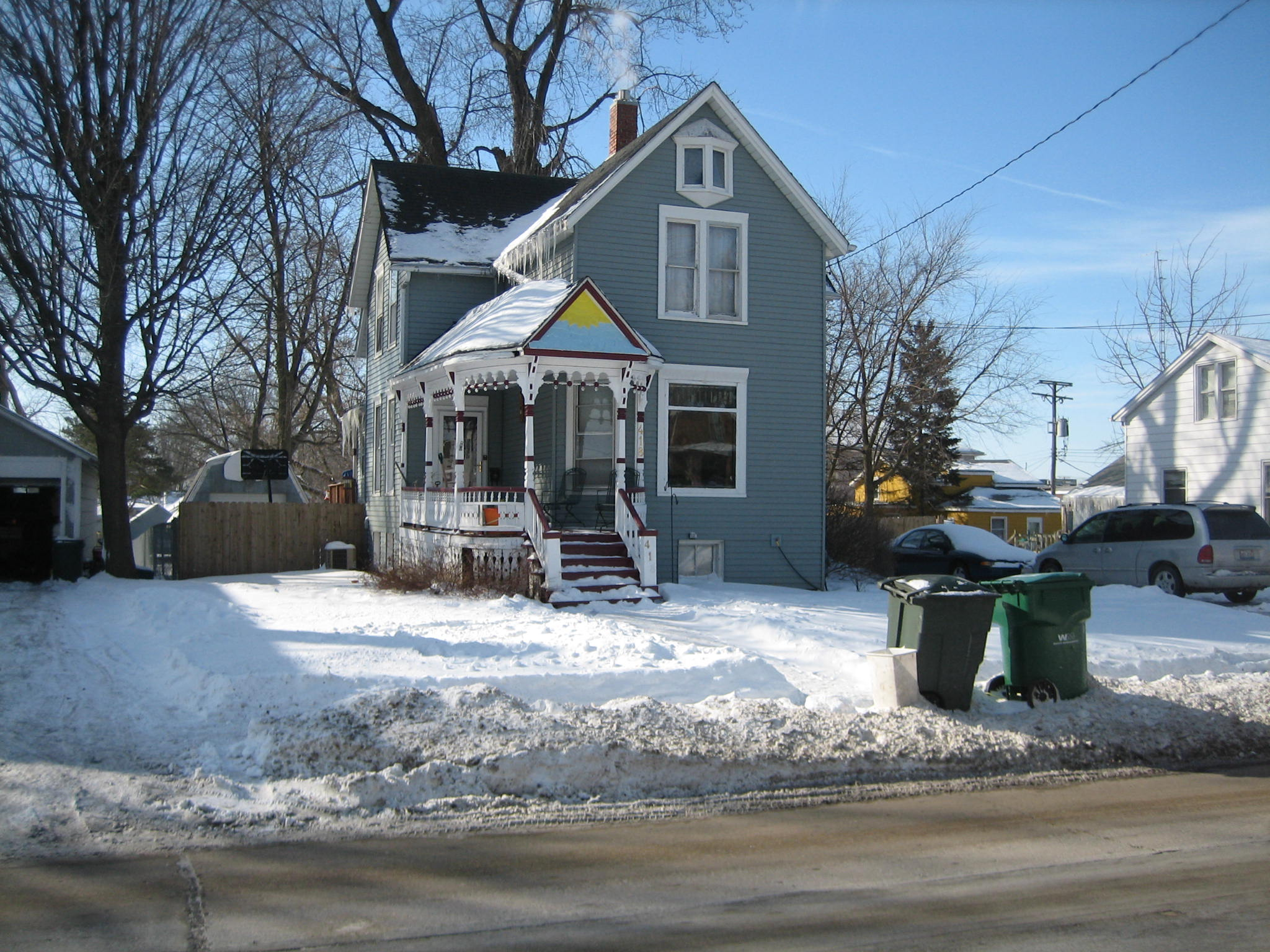
418 W. High Street

The two-story Italianate home at 314 S. Main Street is another example of a contributing property in the Sycamore Historic District that is known only by its address. The house was constructed in 1878. At 512 S. Main St. is a brightly colored example of Queen Anne architecture. The only contributing property along the east-west High Street is the home at 418 W. High.

=== Somonauk Street ===
The house at 312 Somonauk Street is an example of Italianate architecture, it is a nameless contributor to the district's historic nature. The Italianate home further down the same block, at 328, has undergone some exterior changes. Its original wood siding was replaced with vinyl. On the other side of the street, the house at 413 Somonauk is an example of the American Foursquare style of domestic architecture. Also in the 400 block of Somonauk, at 437 is another nameless contributing property.

== Named Houses ==
=== Byers-Faissler House ===
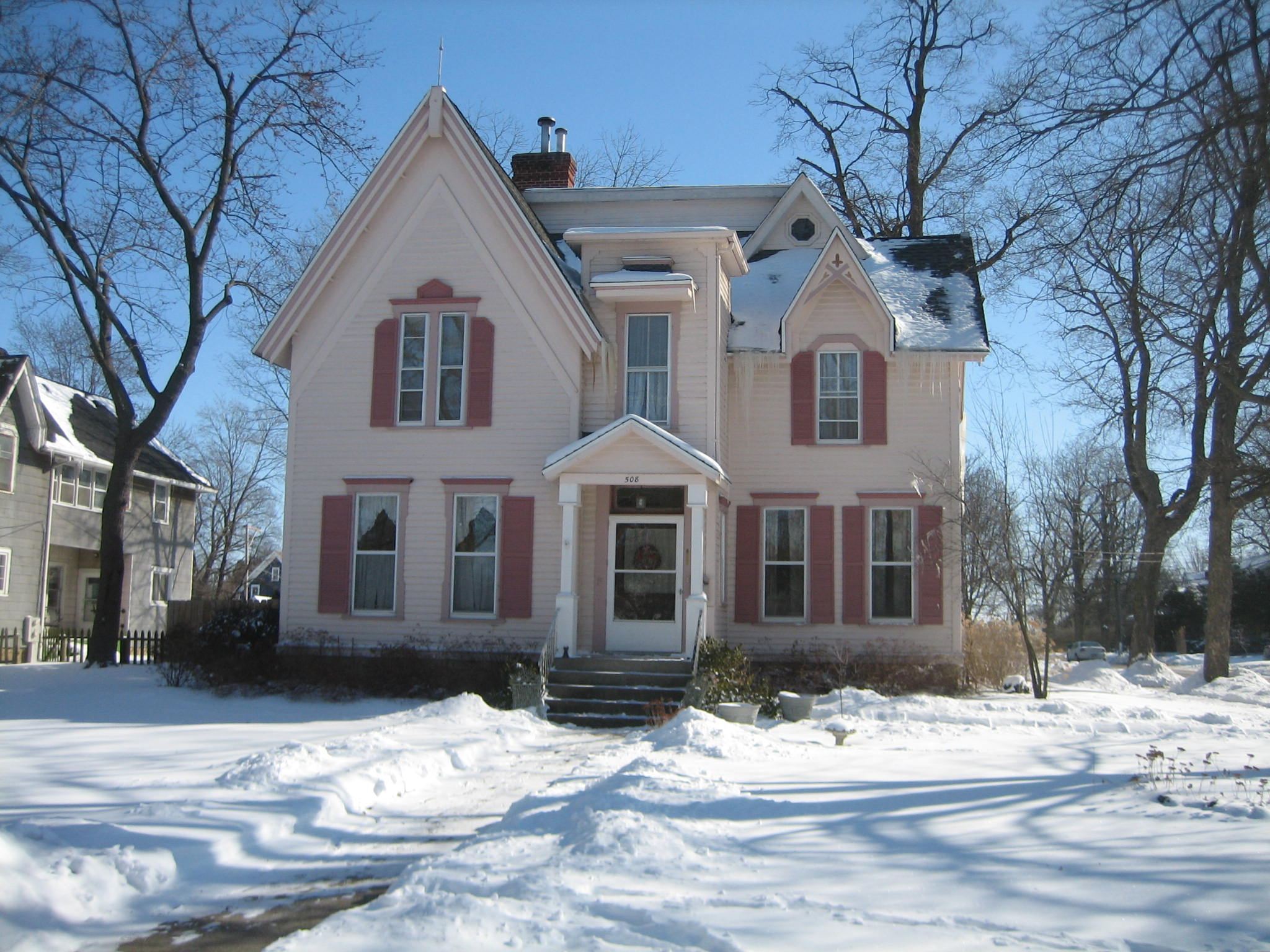
Byers-Faissler House

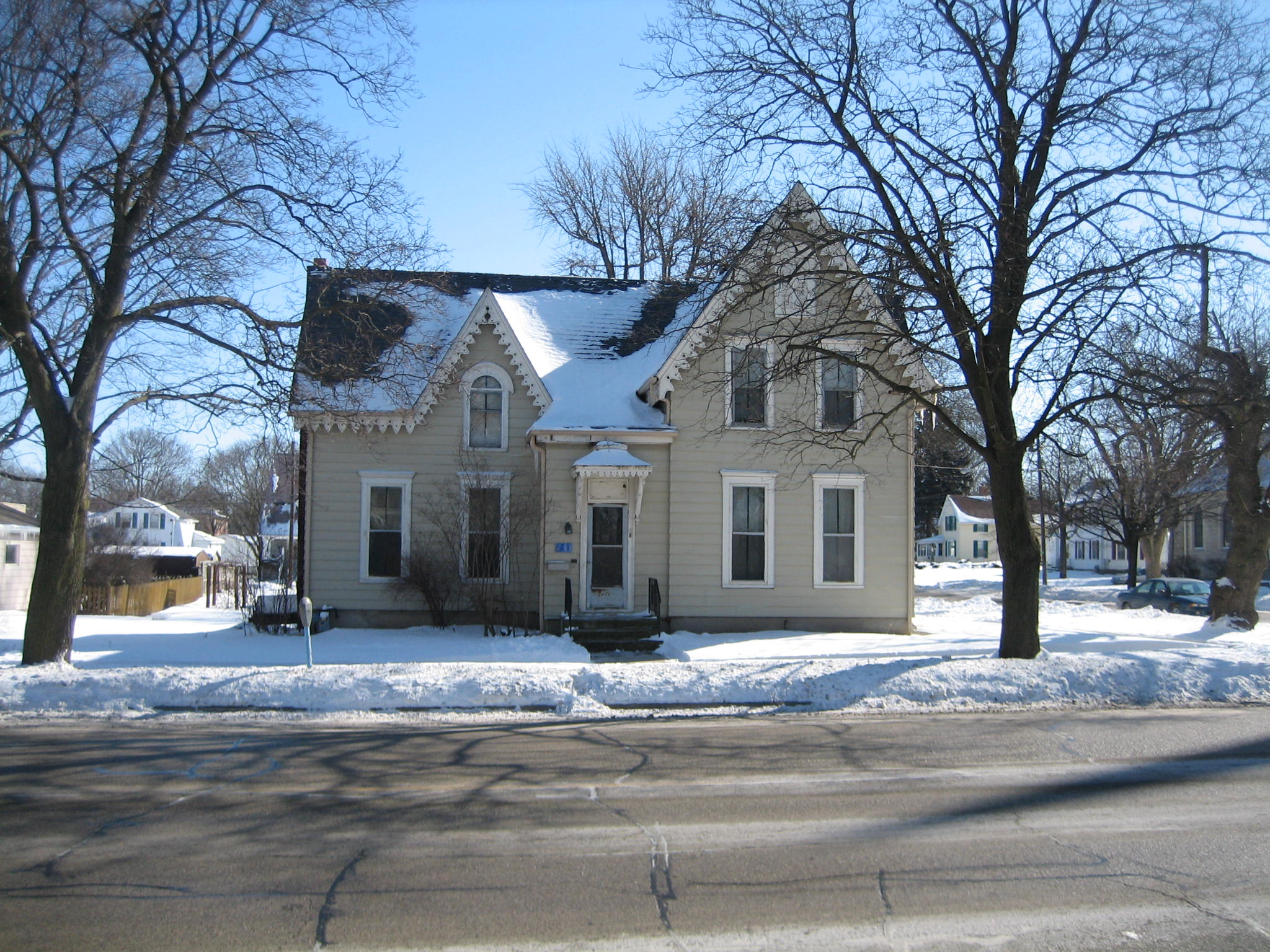
R.A. Smith House

The Byers-Faissler House is located in the 500 block of Sycamore's Somonauk Street, the house is included as a contributing structure to the historic character of the Sycamore Historic District. The house was built in 1867 for Sycamore politician William Byers. The home contains elements of both Gothic Revival and Italianate architecture. It is thought that the main gable once contained the same decorative elements as the smaller gable.

Byers eventually served two terms in the Illinois state legislature, though before he held that office he was active in DeKalb County politics. Byers' youngest daughter, Jane, married native German Johannes (John) Faissler. Faissler became a successful lawyer in Sycamore.

=== Captain R.A. Smith House ===
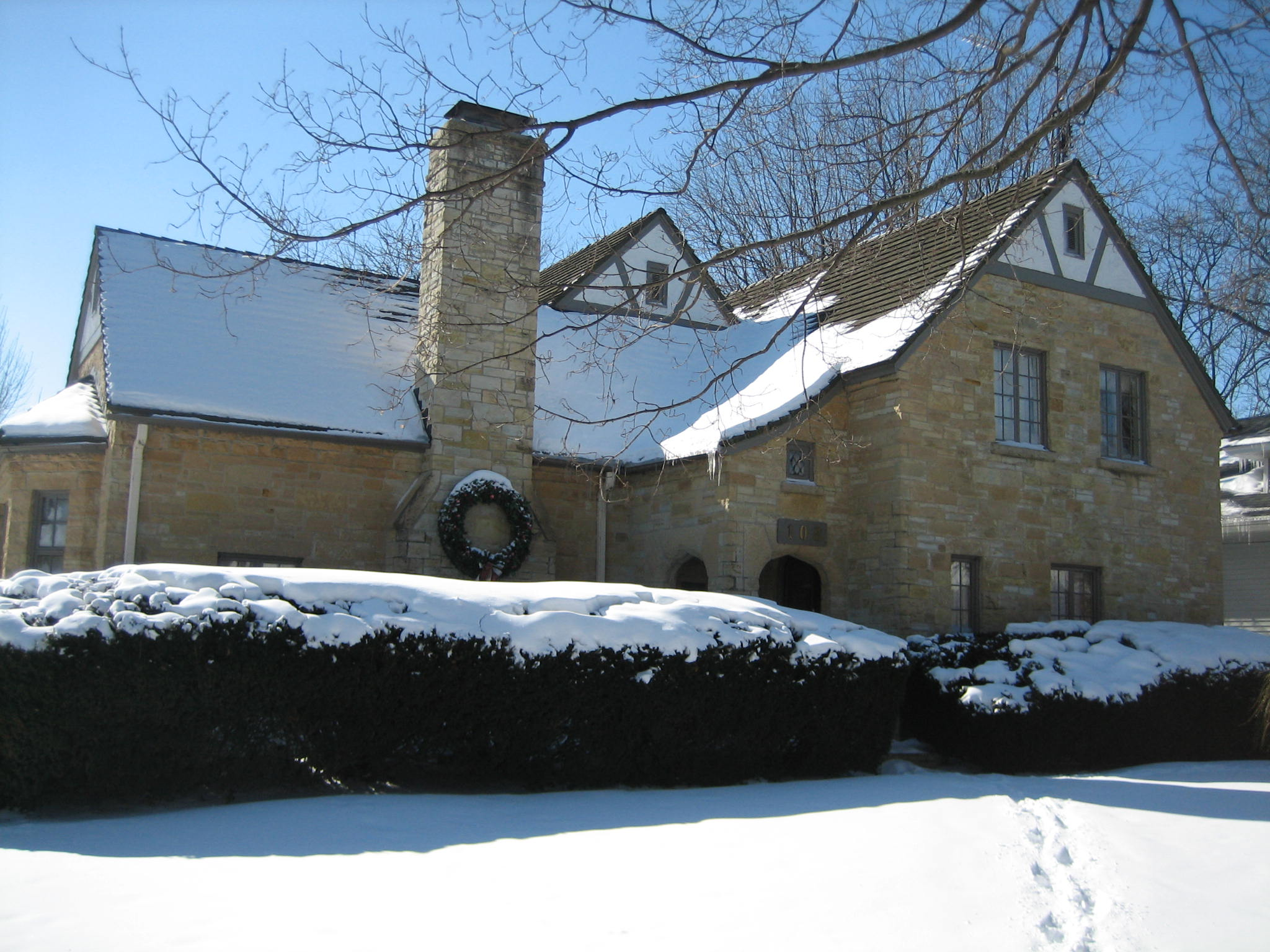
Clark House

The Captain R.A. Smith House, also known as the F.W. Partridge House is another contributing property to the Sycamore Historic District. The house was built sometime before 1871 by Captain R.A. Smith. The Smith House is designed in a Gothic Revival motif by R.A. Smith.

Besides the military Smith was elected treasurer in DeKalb County, little is known about him other than the fact that he designed his home in the 200 block of Sycamore's Somonauk Street. F.W. Partridge was an attorney who began his legal career in the DeKalb County city of Sandwich, Illinois. Later, when he moved to Sycamore, he achieved some notoriety in that profession. During the Civil War Partridge was a breveted Brigadier General. Toward the end of the war he served as DeKalb County Clerk and Recorder; from 1864-1867. President Ulysses S. Grant appointed him as ambassador to Siam.

=== Chappell-Whittemore House ===
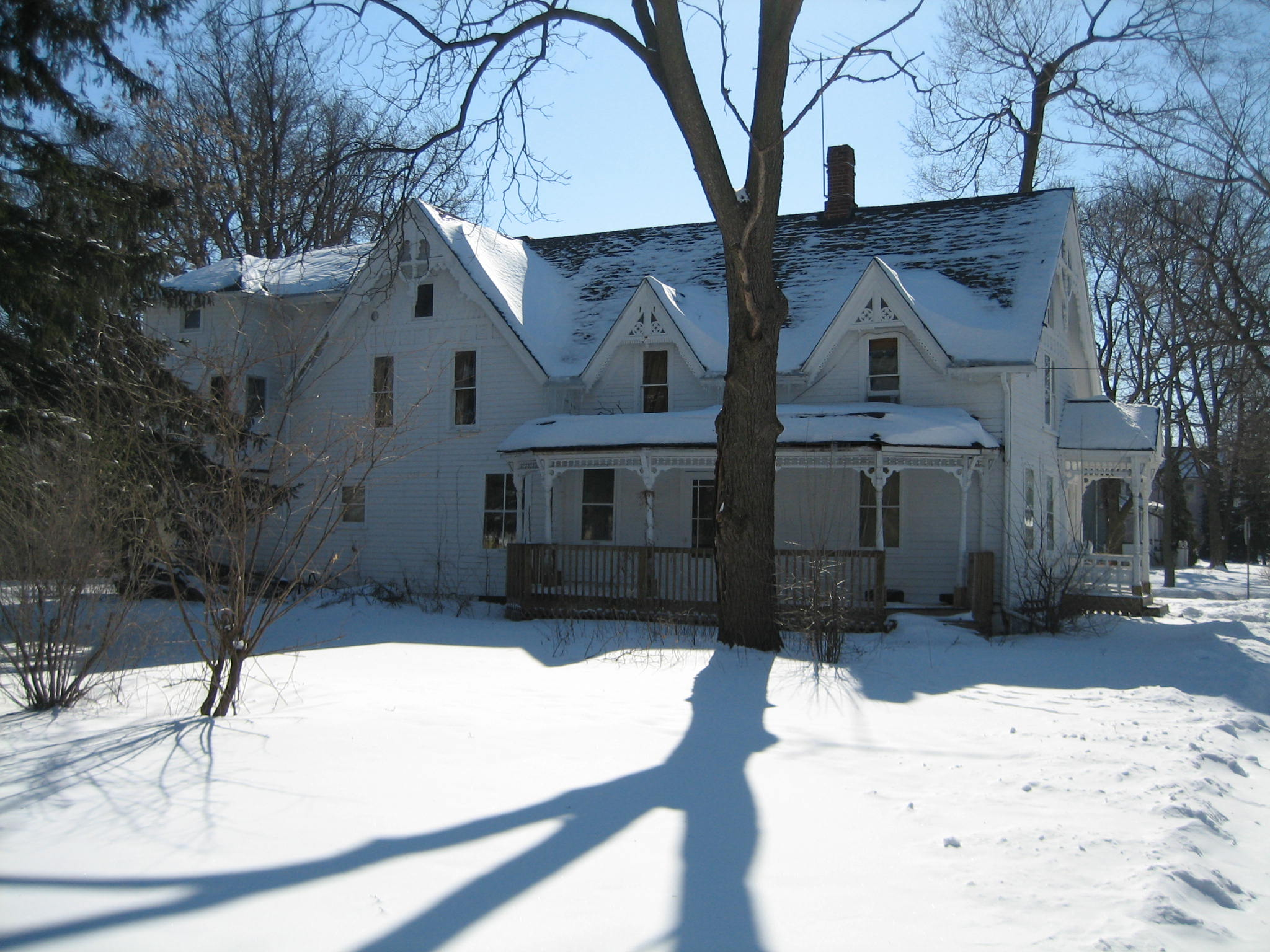
Chappell-Whittemore House

The Chappell-Whittemore House also known as the H.C. Whittemore House, is a historic home in the 200 block of South Main Street in Sycamore. The house was completed sometime 1867 and before 1873. The home is noted for its architectural and historical significance.

Henry C. Whittemore came to Sycamore at a young age, brought by his parents in 1848. He served during the Civil War and after the conflict ended remained a government employee during Reconstruction. As a government employee Whittemore was tasked with helping to reorganize the postal service in the South. He returned to Sycamore in 1867. Upon arriving back in Sycamore he went into the tanning business but after a few years, in 1873, shifted focus to the hardware business. He stayed in hardware for most of life, taking on several different business partners in the process.

Whittemore was politically active, after he left hired government work, both locally and at the state level. In DeKalb County he served as a Sycamore alderman as well as a member of the County Board of Supervisors. At the turn of the 20th century he headed up the building committee which oversaw the construction of the third, and current, DeKalb County Courthouse, another notable historic district structure. At the state level Whittemore served in the 34th Illinois General Assembly and as a trustee at the State Home for Juvenile Offenders in Geneva, Illinois.

=== Charles A. Bishop House ===
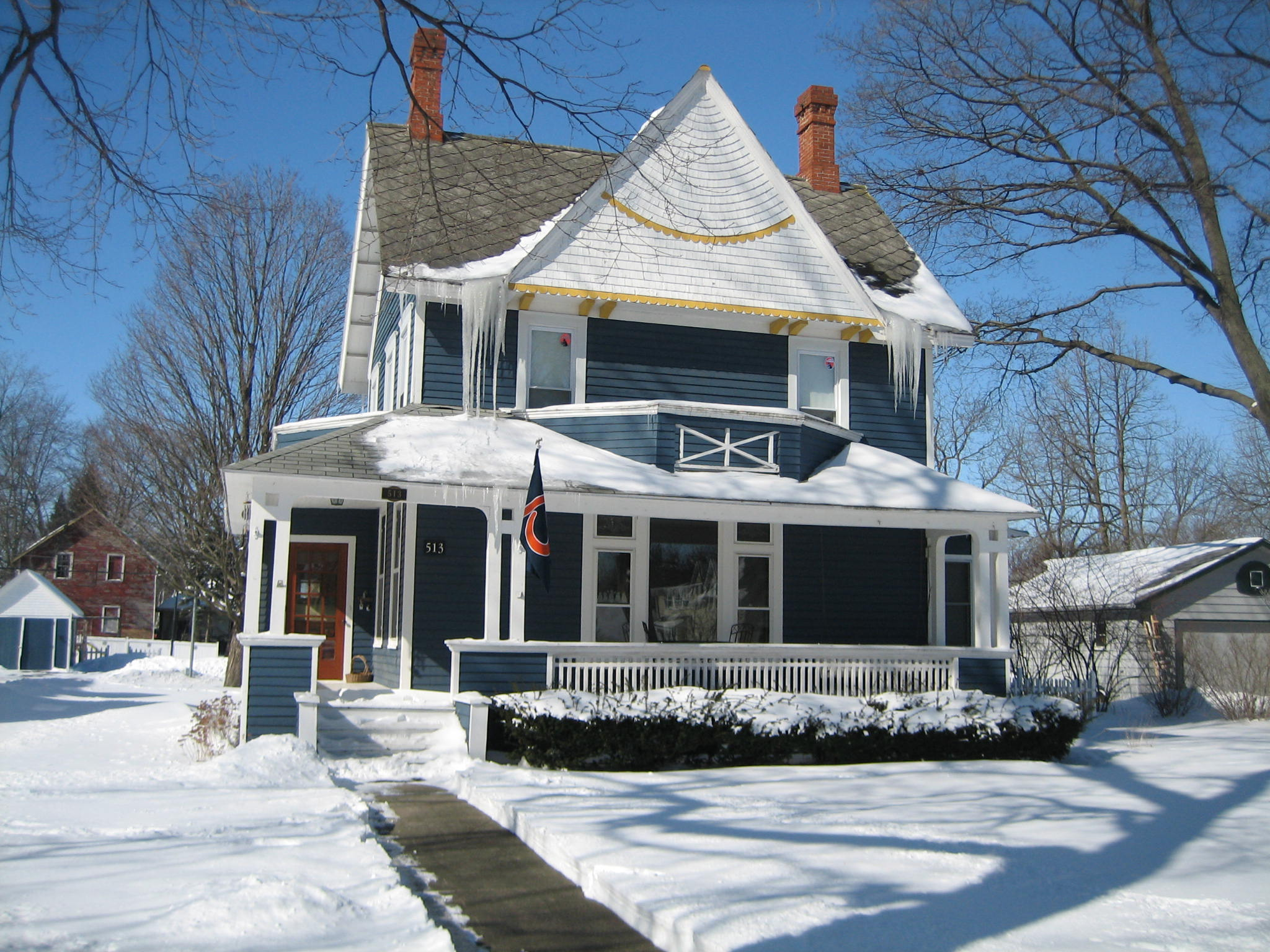
Charles A. Bishop House

The Charles A Bishop House, also known as the William Phelps House, is in 500 block of South Main Street in Sycamore.The house started its existence in 1863 attached to the J.H. Rogers/Bettis House, which currently stands next door to the Bishop House. In 1887 the Bishop House was moved, by mule, from its original location. That property became the site for the c. 1890 J.H. Rogers House. When the Bishop House was moved the Rogers-Bettis House was split off from it and planted next door. The property the house stands on today was part of the original 80 acres (320,000 m^{2}) purchased by Ellzey P. Young from the United States government by an act of Congress.

Bishop was a highly respected citizen of Sycamore. After coming to Sycamore, from New Brunswick, in 1878 Bishop was admitted to the Bar in 1880. He practiced law with Harvey A. Jones and eventually held the posts of circuit and county judge.

=== Charles Kellum House ===
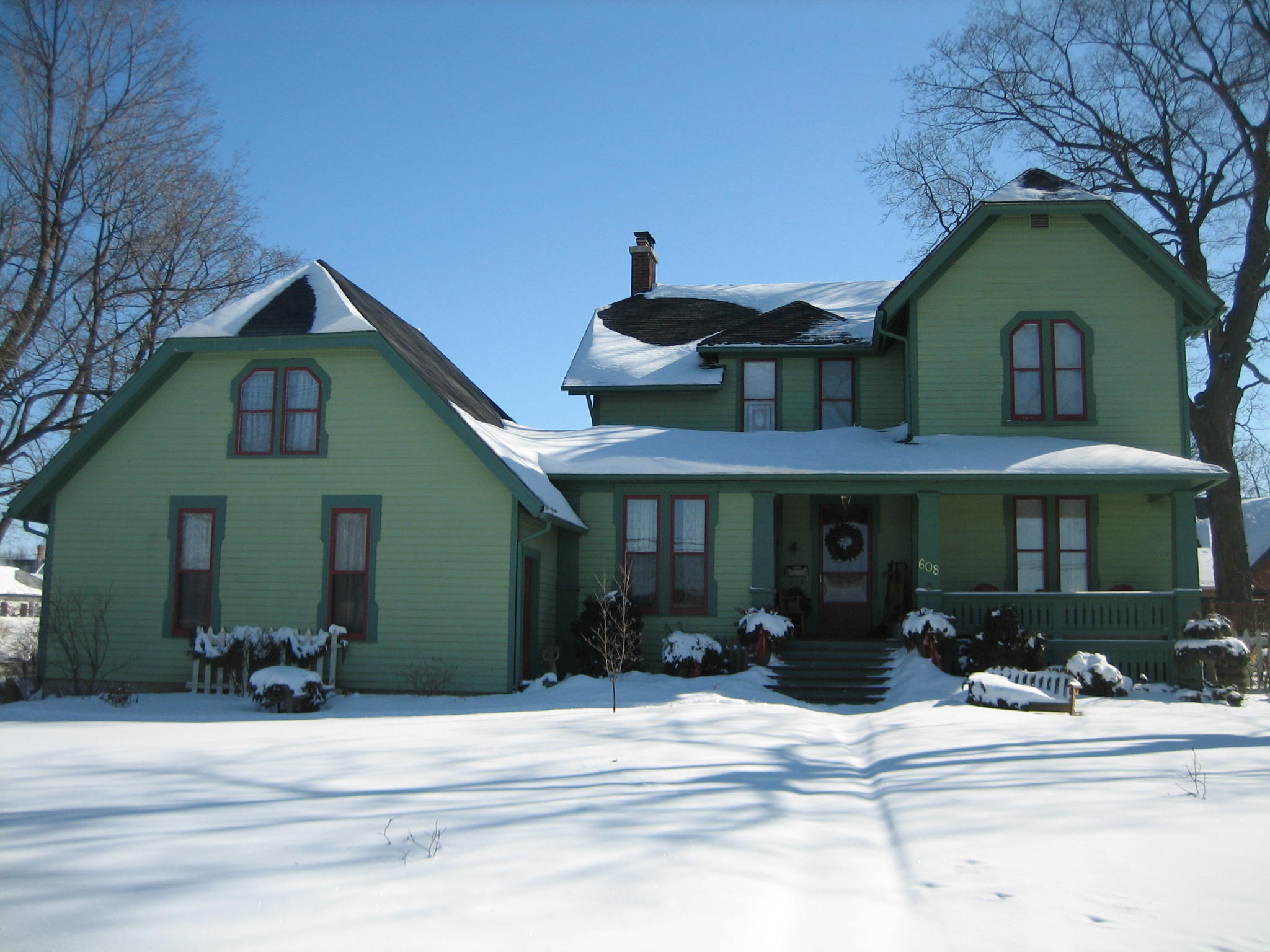
Charles Kellum House

The Charles Kellum House was constructed in 1858 by Charles Kellum. Kellum came to Sycamore in 1855 as an attorney and eventually served in several public offices, including state's attorney and circuit court judge. The house was once a larger structure than it is today. The building at 123 Lincoln Street, directly behind the Kellum House, was separated from the main house, in the 600 block of Somonauk Street, in the 1920s. The house's owner at the time had a daughter who was getting married and he presented the separated wing as a wedding present for the couple. The roof is multiple gabled and features the distinctive Jerkin style roof. Each of the home's gables contain the element, which is a mesh of the gable and hipped roof.

=== David DeGraff House ===
The David DeGraff House, in the 900 block of Somonauk Street is just within the boundaries of the Sycamore Historic District. This large, two-story Italianate home is considered a contributing property by the National Register of Historic Places. The house was built in 1867 by wealthy Sycamore farmer David DeGraff.

=== Dr. Clark House ===
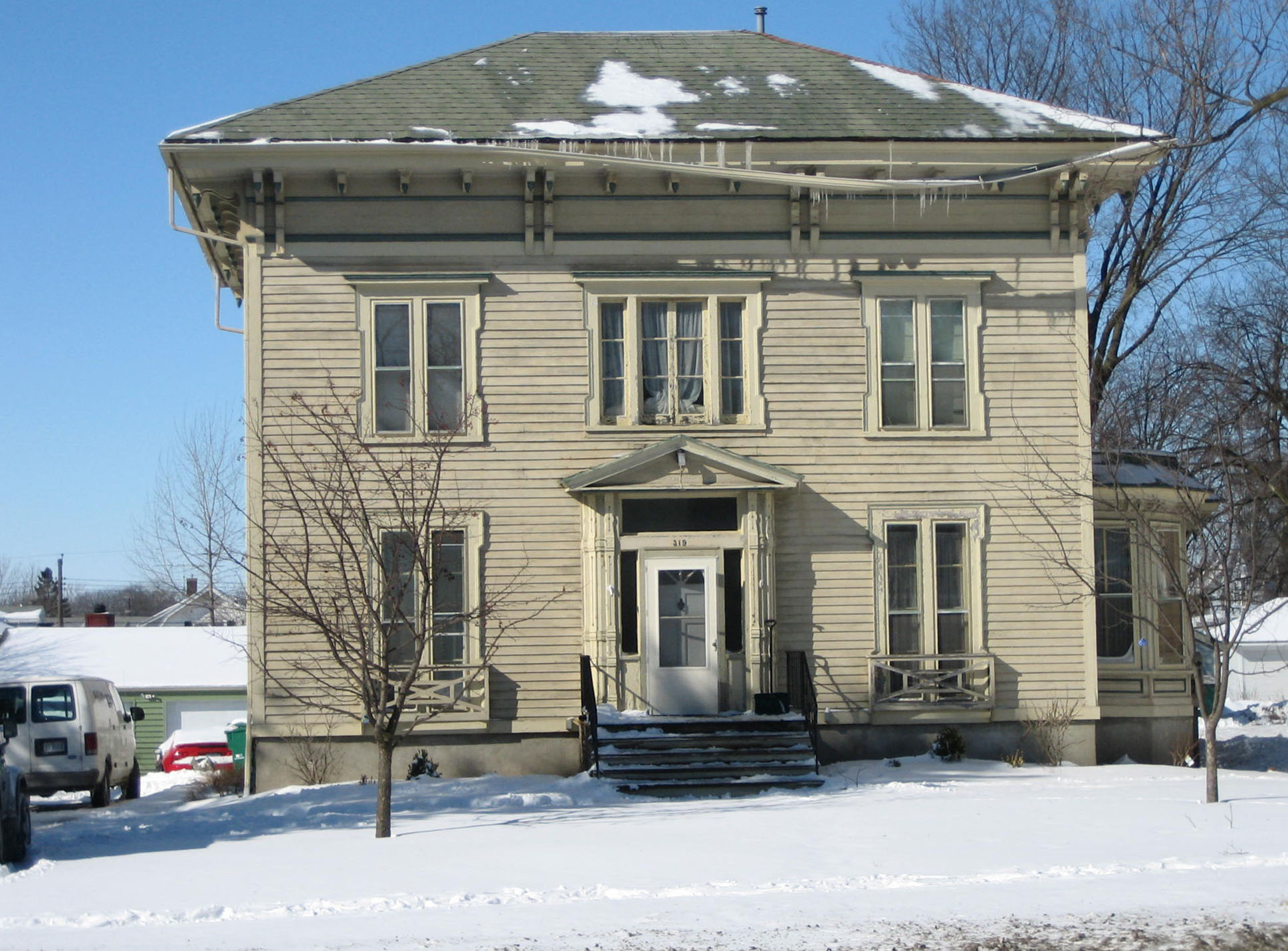
Bryan House

The Dr. Clark House is another contributing structure to the historic integrity of the Sycamore Historic District. The house stands at the corner of Lincoln and Main Streets in Sycamore. The home was constructed in 1936 for Dr. Clark, a Sycamore radiologist who worked at Sycamore Hospital. Clark lived in the home until 1970. The new owners added an addition to the house in 1996 The house was completed in Shingle style and its exterior construction is of brick.

=== Dr. Orlando M. Bryan House ===
The Dr. Orlando M. Bryan House, stands in the 300 block of Somonauk Street in Sycamore. This Italianate structure was erected around 1866, since that date it has been altered from its original appearance.

Bryan was the "pioneer" physician for the settlement of Sycamore, Illinois, beginning his medical practice in the city that would become the county seat of DeKalb County in 1846. During the Civil War Bryan was charged with running the General Hospital of the Army of the Mississippi. Later he requested and was granted the post of Medical Director and Purveyor of the Department of New Mexico. Bryan returned to Sycamore in 1866.

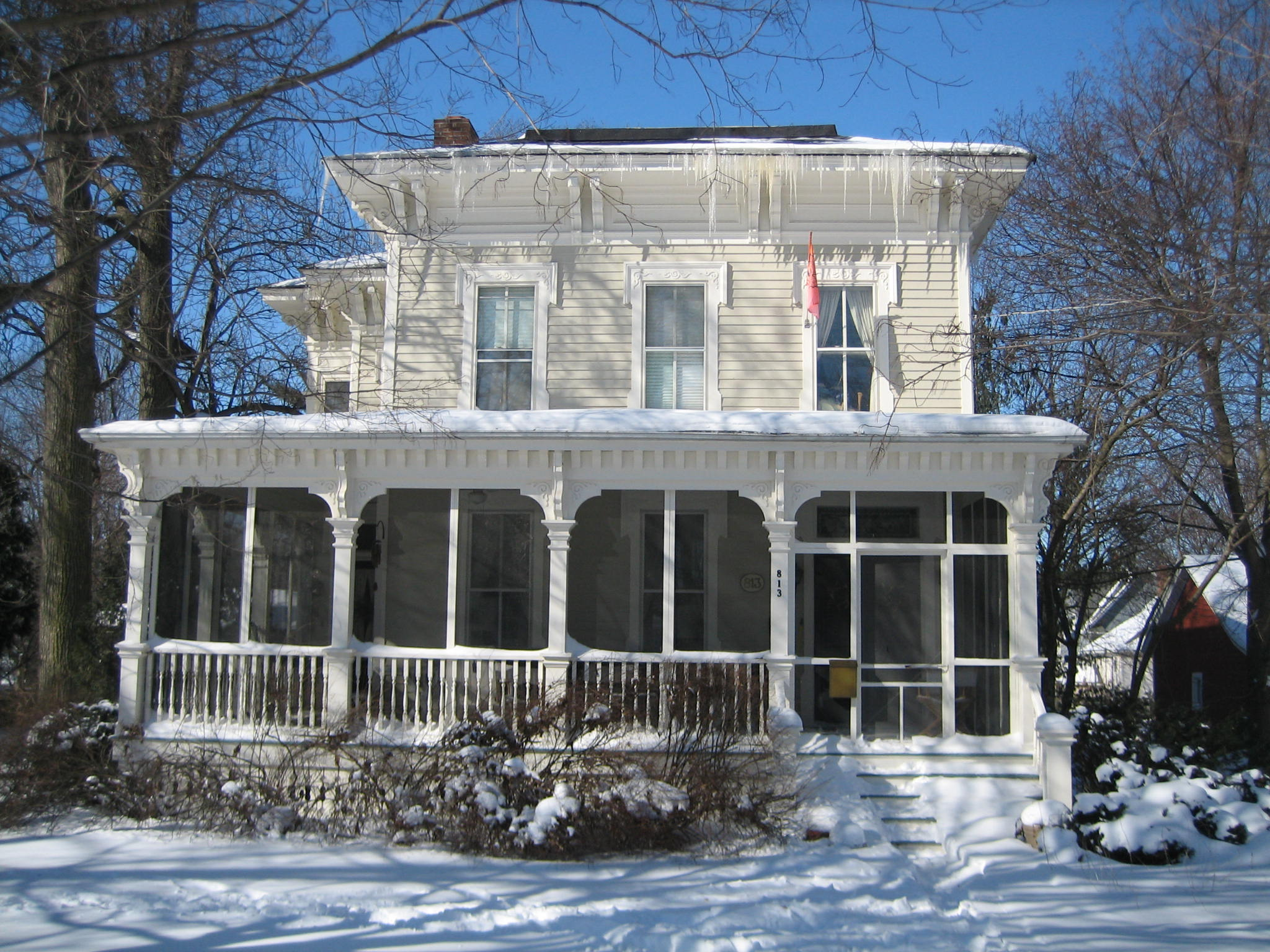
Olin Smith House

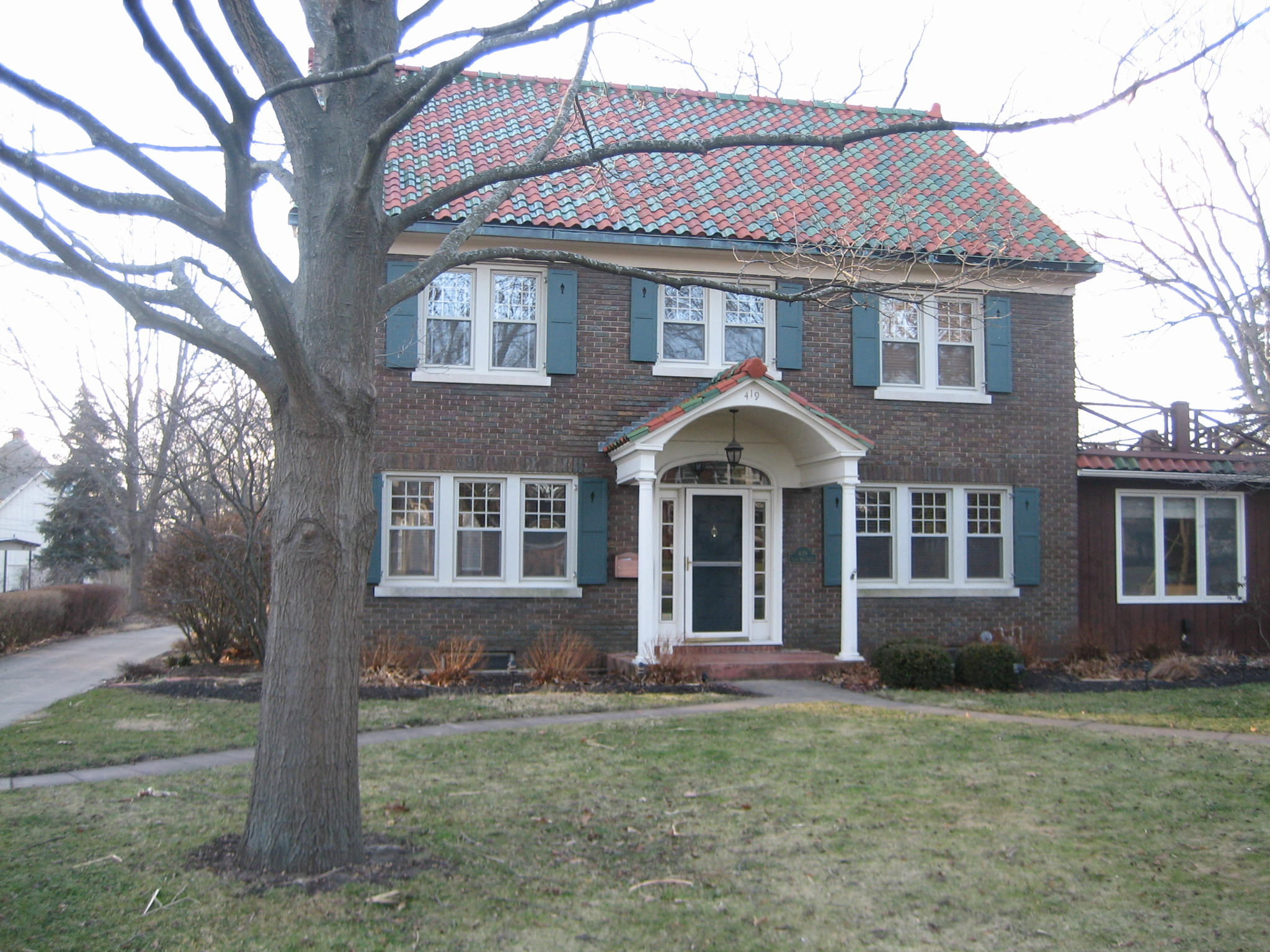
Elmore Cooper House

=== Dr. Olin H. Smith House ===
The Dr. Olin H. Smith House is located in the 800 block of Somonauk Street in Sycamore. The house was constructed between 1870 and 1877 for Dr. Olin H. Smith. Smith, who was the town's first dentist, was raised in Sycamore and attended Sycamore schools before going to medical school in Philadelphia. He was born October 15, 1856, in St. Johnsbury, Vermont, the youngest of six children of Martha L. and James M. Smith. On arriving in Sycamore in 1857, the family first settled in a simple farm house on what is now the 800 block of Somonauk Street, before constructing the present house. In 1900 he was elected mayor, a time during which he worked to bring more industry to the city. Dr. Smith died in Sycamore on August 5, 1939. His wife, Lillian Babcock Smith, and daughter Rose Smith Mussell, continued to live in the house until their deaths in 1947 and 1950, respectively. In 1950 the house was sold out of the family.

The Smith House is an Italianate home and one of several such homes along Somonauk Street to have been influenced by the Italianate design of the George P. Wild House. The Wild House is another of Somonauk Street's contributing structures. The Smith House is considered architecturally significant in a historic district where 75% of all structures are considered contributing properties.

=== Elmore Cooper House ===
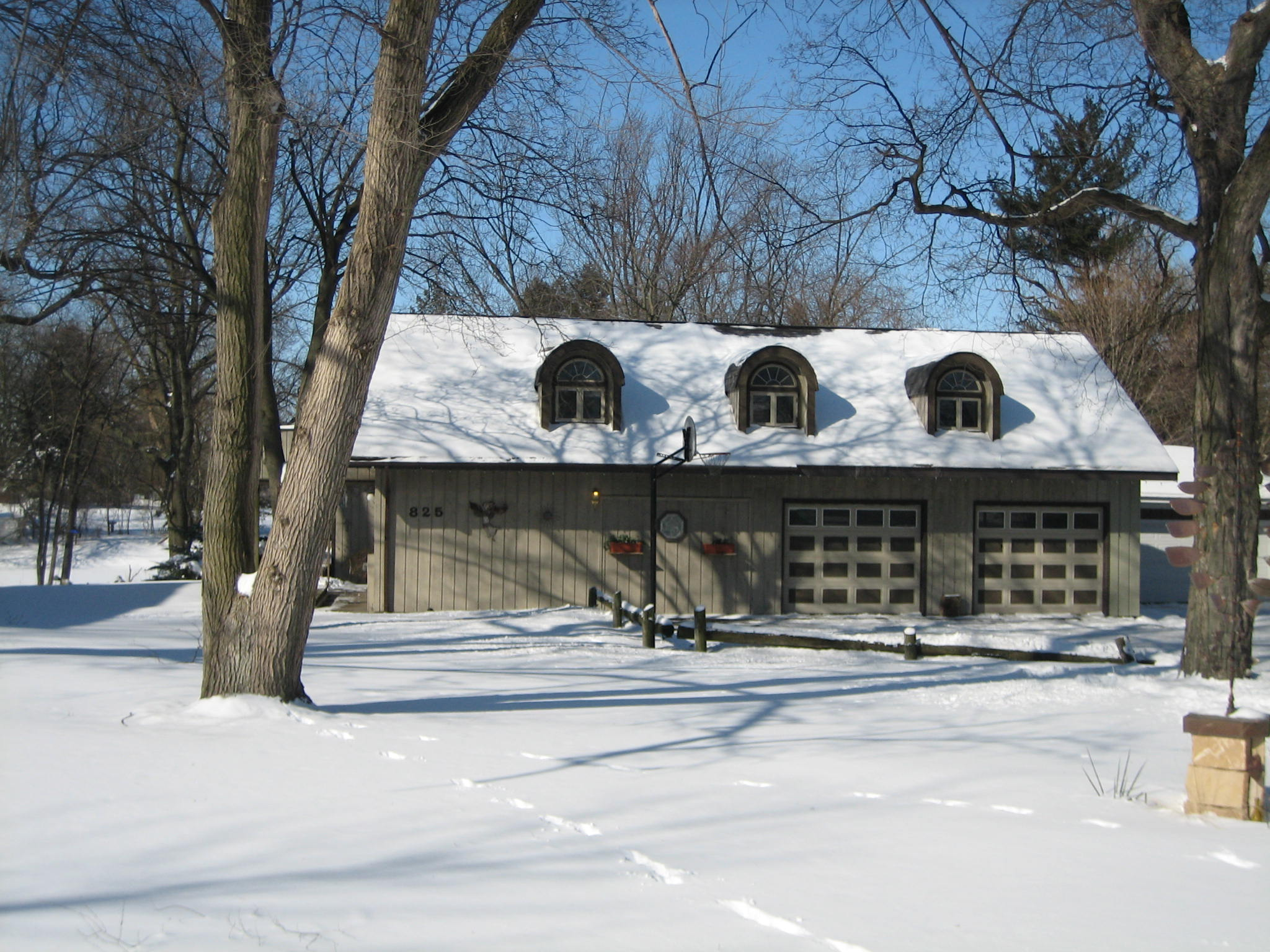
Nesbitt House

The 'Elmore Cooper House is listed as a contributing structure to the district's overall historical character. The Elmore Cooper House was built in 1924 by the Sycamore gas station entrepreneur Elmore Cooper. The house is of a Colonial Revival style, with English roots. It features simple lines and proportions, which make it architecturally distinctive. It features an original roof. Elmore Cooper opened Sycamore's first gas station in 1898, it was located across the street from the DeKalb County Courthouse on Illinois Route 64.

=== Esther Mae Nesbitt House ===
Once a carriage house that belonged to Chauncey Ellwood, the Esther Mae Nesbitt House is how a home in the DeKalb County, Illinois, city of Sycamore. It stands next door to the Chauncey Ellwood House and is a contributing property in the Sycamore Historic District. The home, in the 800 block of Somonauk Street, was originally Chauncey Ellwood's carriage house. The 1837 building was converted into an artist's studio and, eventually, a residence, by Esther Mae Nesbitt.

Nesbitt was born in 1913. She rose to the rank of master sergeant while serving in the U.S. Army as part of the Women's Army Corps. During World War II Nesbitt was awarded the French Croix de Guerre for her command of a top secret war room.

=== Floyd E. Brower House ===
The Floyd E. Brower House is another of the historic homes in the DeKalb County, Illinois, city of Sycamore. The house, in the 400 block of Sycamore's Somonauk Street, lies in the heart of the Sycamore Historic District. It was constructed for Sycamore attorney, Floyd Brower.

=== General Daniel Dustin House ===
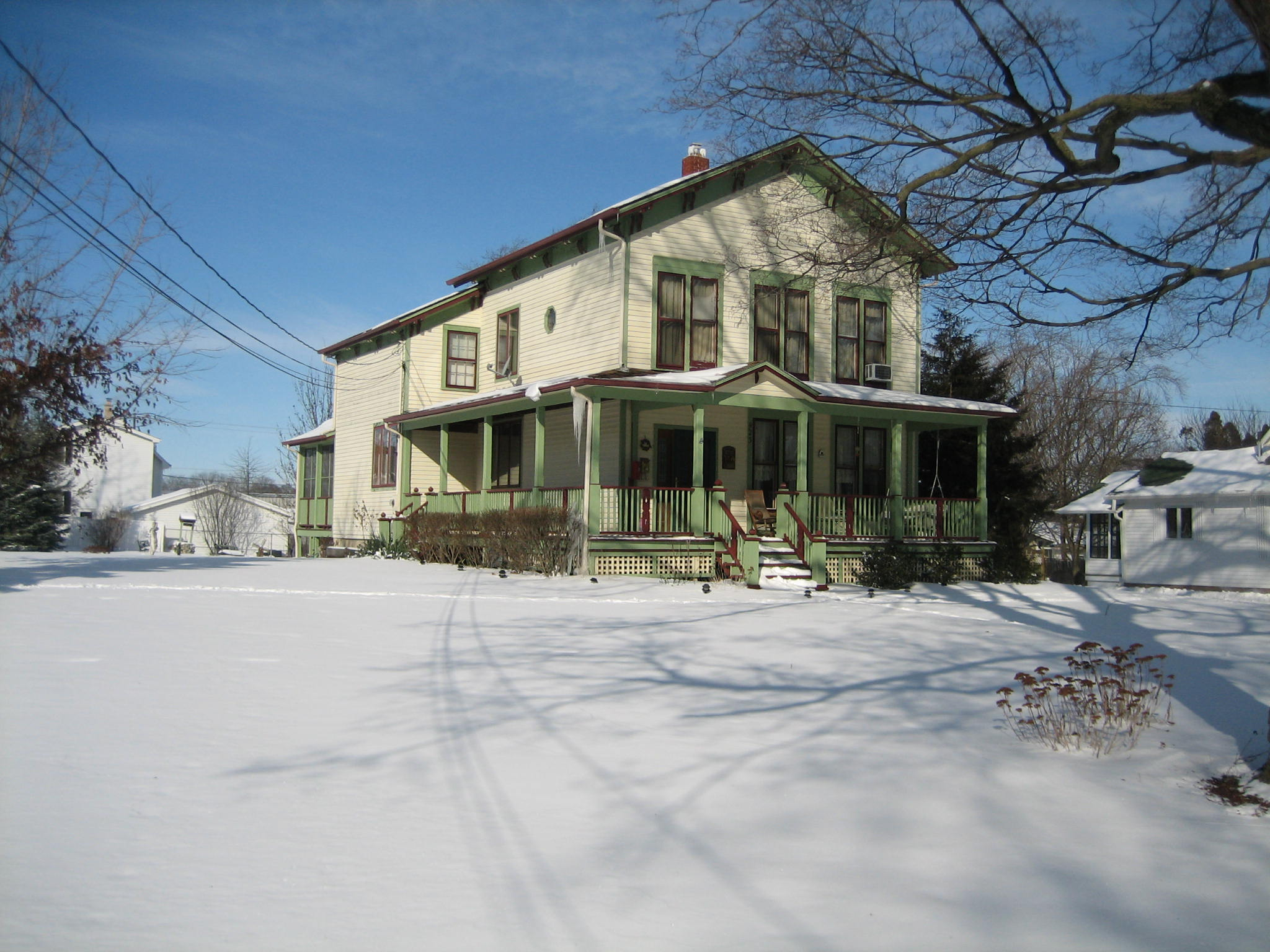
Dustin House

The General Daniel Dustin House is a 19th-century residential home in the 400 block of California Street and is a contributing structure to the historical integrity of the Sycamore Historic District. Daniel Dustin served in the United States Army and accompanied General William Tecumseh Sherman on his "grand march to the sea" during the American Civil War. In Sycamore Dustin settled in the California Street home and made a living as a merchant, working with James E. Ellwood in the sale of medicines. He eventually became DeKalb County's county clerk.

=== George S. Robinson-Ellzey P. Young House ===
This simple I-house home was constructed in 1847 for early Sycamore settler and, later, elected official Ellzey P. Young. Built in 1847 the house is one of the oldest in the city of Sycamore. It is believed that Eleanor Roosevelt once stayed in the home during a visit to nearby Northern Illinois University, in DeKalb. Young had the home built and later George S. Robinson, a prominent local attorney and county judge, lived in the residence.

Young was one of Sycamore's earliest settlers, coming to the town in 1839. He went into the mercantile business with James Waterman, a prominent local businessman for whom the historic Waterman Block is named.

=== George P. Wild House ===
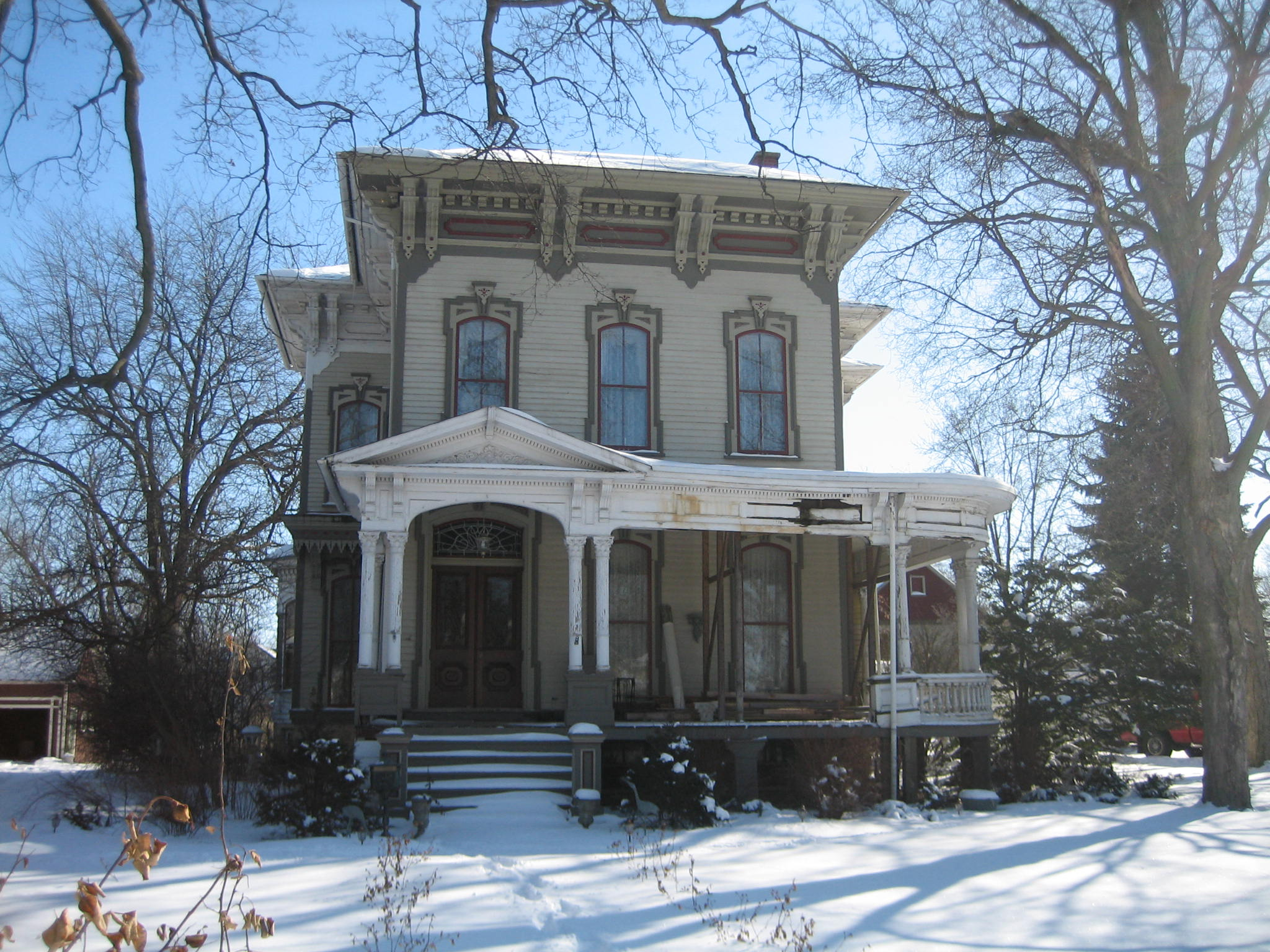
George P. Wild House

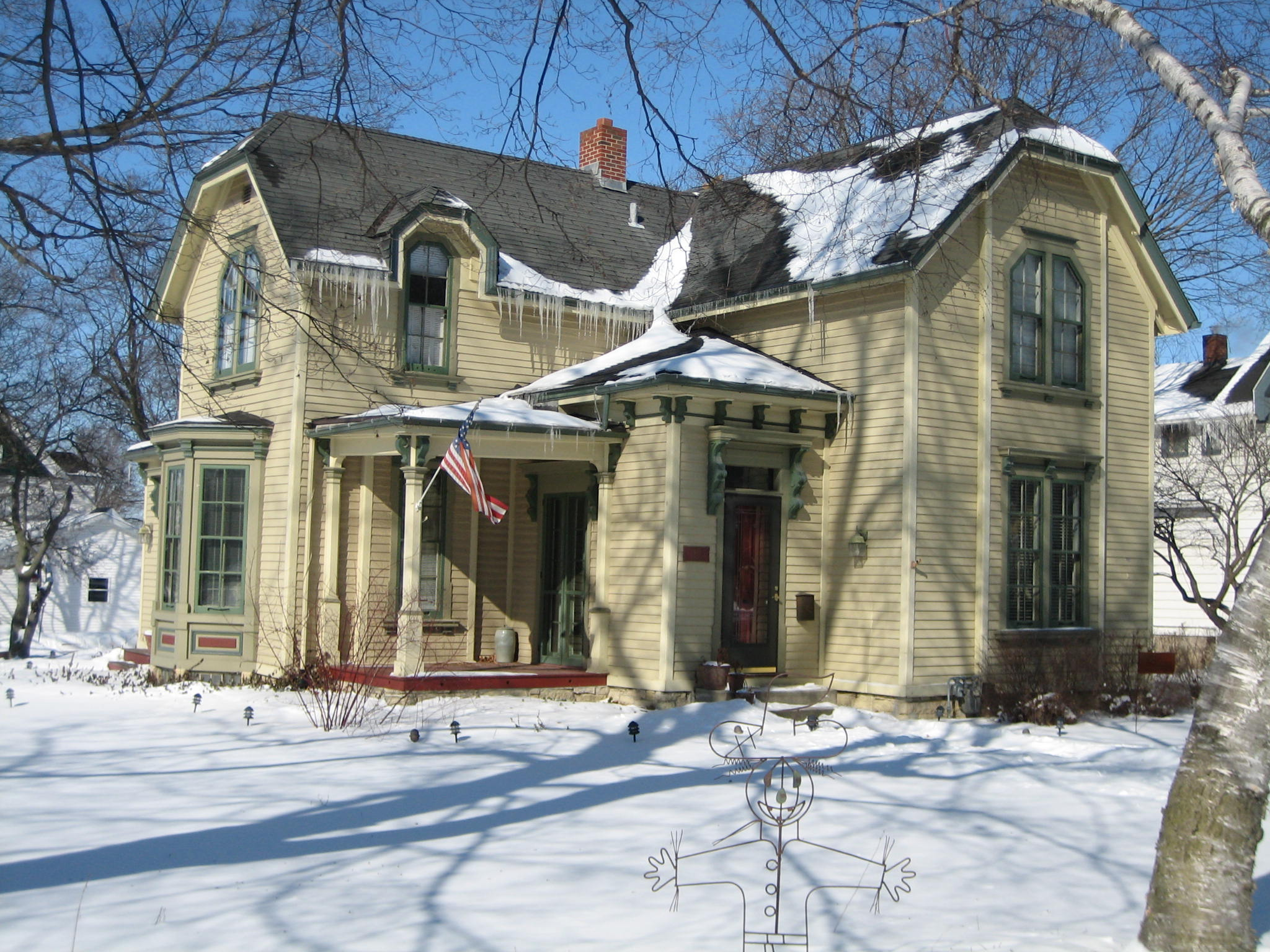
Hosea Willard House

The George P. Wild House is a large two-story Italianate home constructed in 1869 by George P. Wild, a successful Sycamore dry goods dealer, when he commissioned a Chicago architect, either John W. Ackerman or George Ackerman, to build the two-story house for $4,000. The final cost of construction was $4,500 and the bill outraged Wild.

The building was designed in the Italianate architectural style. It features a veranda, though not original, which winds from the front door, around the building, to the secondary entrance on the home's south side. The door has the name G.P. Wild etched into its glass.

=== Henry Garbutt House ===
The Henry Garbutt House is another one of 187 contributing structures to the Sycamore Historic District in Sycamore, Illinois. The 1890 Queen Anne style home stands on South Main Street and was home to Henry Garbutt, a prominent Sycamore banker.

=== Hosea Willard House ===
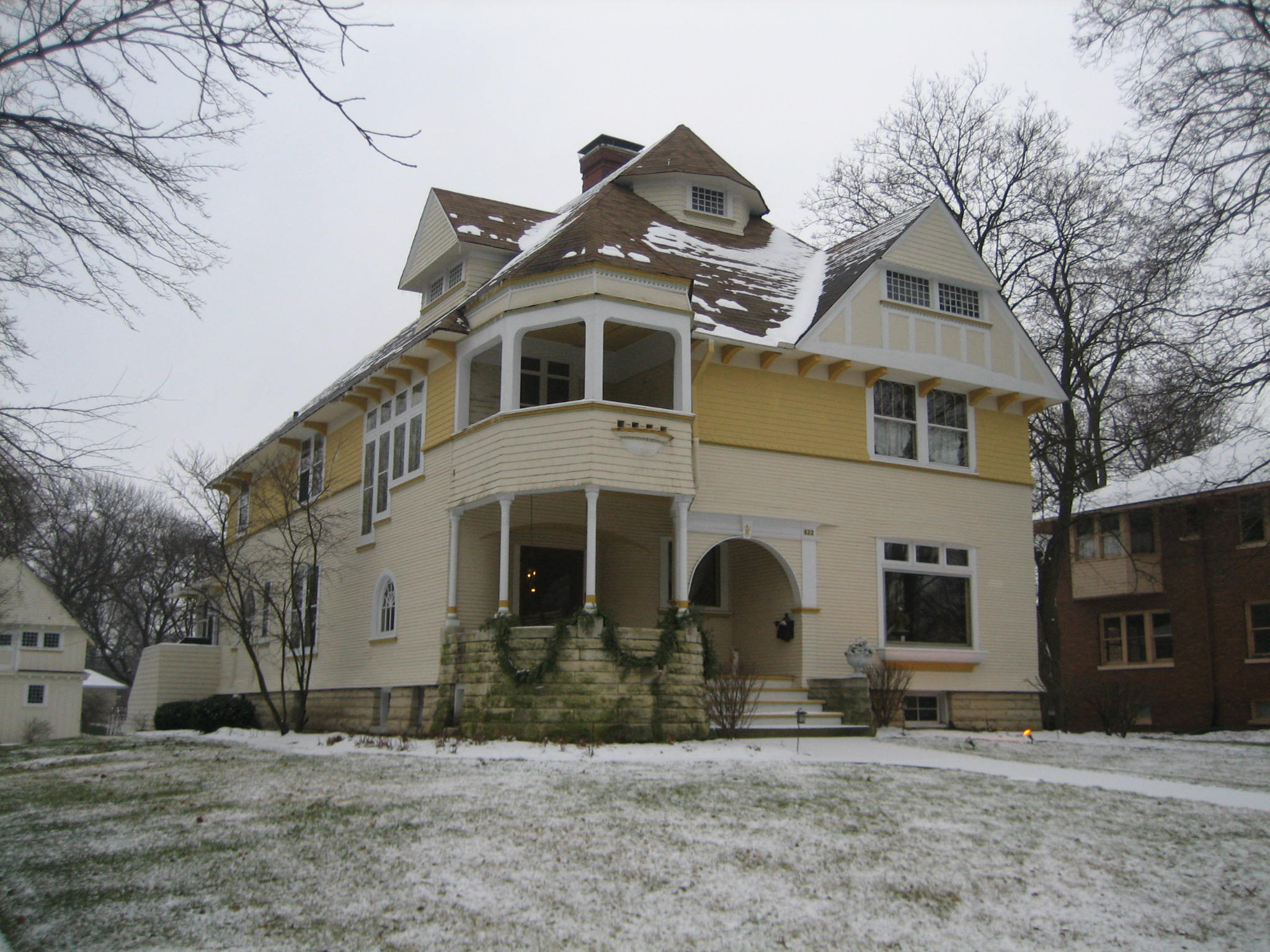
Rogers House

The Hosea W. Willard House, in the 400 block of Somonauk Street is one of numerous 19th-century houses in the historic district. The house was built by Sycamore mason Hosea Willard in 1867. The Willard House is one of the Sycamore Historic District houses to feature the distinctive Jerkin roof, basically a combination of the simple gable roof and the hipped roof. Both the main gables and the smaller gables over the second floor windows contain this roof element. On the home's south facade a prominent oriel is set into the first floor.

Willard was a prominent Sycamore mason and builder. He was responsible for the construction of several of the historic district's other notable buildings, including the St. Peter's Episcopal Church as well as the Old Congregational Church (now Sycamore Baptist Church). Willard arrived in Sycamore in 1843, a time when the city had just 18 homes.

=== J.H. Rogers House ===
J.H. Rogers settled in Sycamore in 1858. He was a highly respected dry goods merchant and associate of George R. Wild. Wild's House is another of the Sycamore Historic District's notable homes. Later in his dry goods merchant career he worked without Wild. His c. 1890 home is a blend of Queen Anne style and Romanesque Revival architecture. The distinctly Queen Anne turret on the home's northwest side is offset by the distinctly Romanesque arch over the front doorway.

=== J.H. Rogers/Bettis House ===
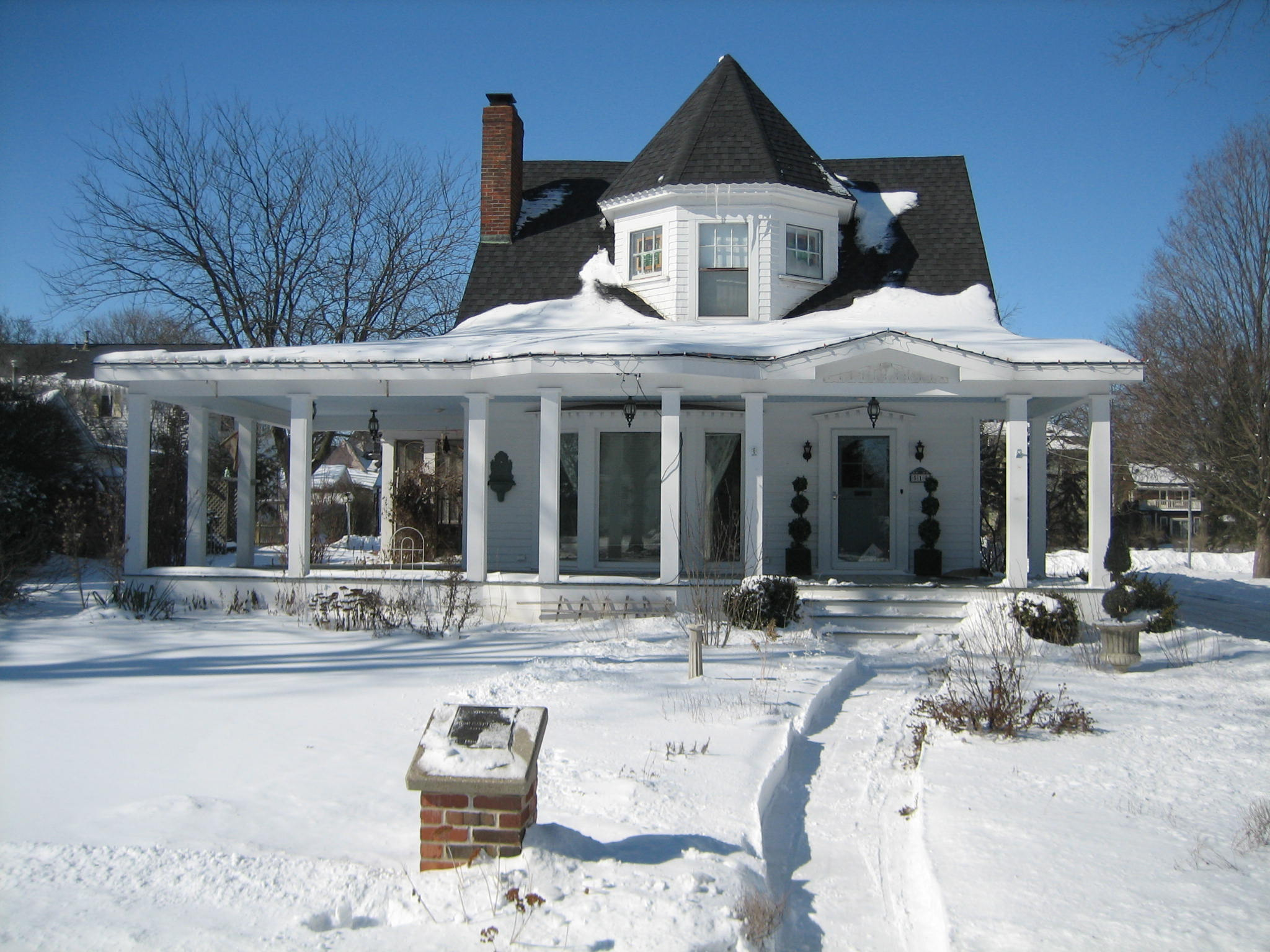
Rogers-Bettis House

The J.H. Rogers/Bettis House, also known as the John Gathercoal House, is located in the 500 block of Main Street. The house began its existence in 1863 attached to the Charles A. Bishop House, which currently stands next door to the Bettis House. In 1887 the Bishop house was moved, by mule, from its original location. That property became the site for the c. 1890 J.H. Rogers House. When the Bishop House was moved the Rogers-Bettis House was split off from it and planted next door. The property the house stands on today was part of the original 80 acres (320,000 m^{2}) purchased by Ellzey P. Young from the United States government by an act of Congress. In 1902 a music professor, Frederick B. Bettis purchased the house.

=== Stephens House ===
The Stephens House, in the 800 block of Somonauk Street, is an Italianate structure and considered to be architecturally significant in a historic district where 75% of the buildings are contributing properties to the historic integrity of the district.

=== Wally Thurow House ===
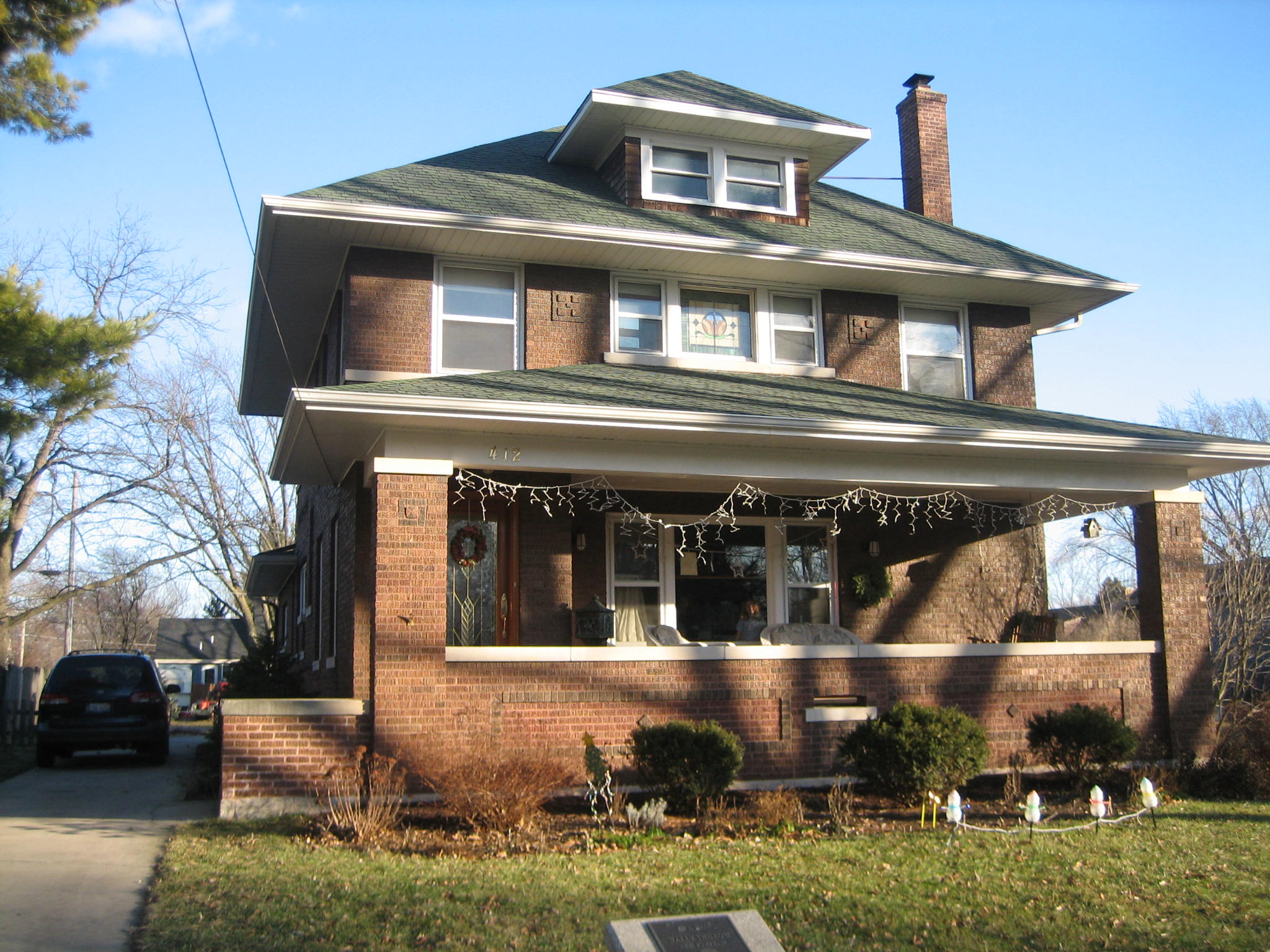
Thurow House

The Wally Thurow House is a 1917 American Foursquare with a brick exterior and oak interiors. The Four Square style was a reaction to the complexity and excess found in Victorian and Revival style homes that were popular in the later half of the 19th century. Incorporating elements of the Prairie School, pioneered by Frank Lloyd Wright, and American Craftsman styles the two-and-a-half-story house exhibits the classic boxy shape, a mostly hipped roof, and a central dormer. The front facade is dominated by a brick porch supported by two large pillars.

Yet the house is as historically important as it is architecturally significant. The events surrounding the founding of the Sycamore Pumpkin Festival occurred at the house in 1956. Wally "Mr. Pumpkin" Thurow is considered the founder of the Sycamore Pumpkin Festival. The festival essentially started as Thurow's personal Halloween celebration; he filled his lawn with decorated pumpkins. Thurow pushed the Lions Club to expand on his idea and every year since 1962, during the Pumpkin Fest, the lawn of the DeKalb County Courthouse is filled with carved, decorated and otherwise enhanced pumpkins, many of them created by children and families.

=== William McAllister House ===
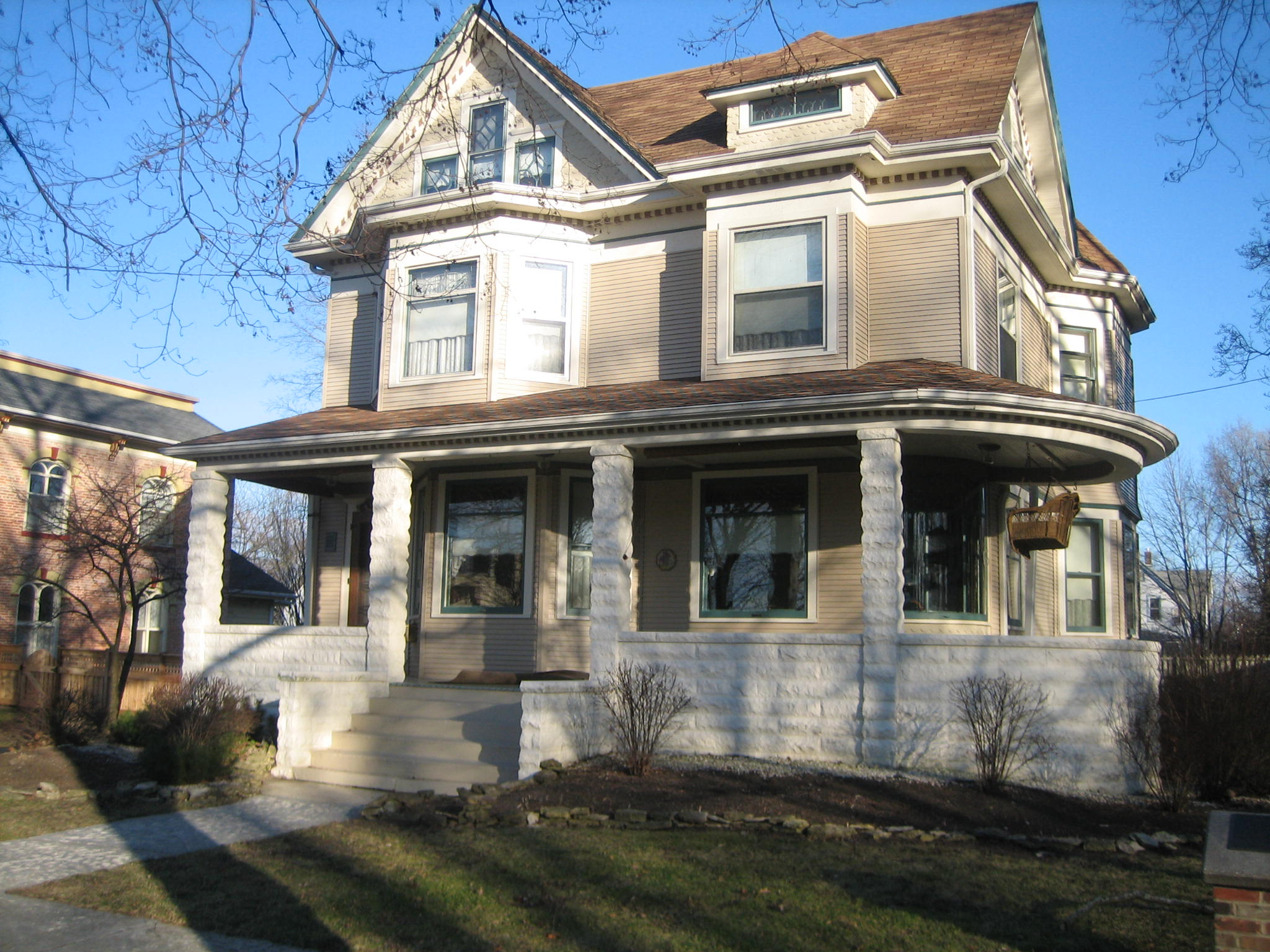
McAllister House

The William McAllister House is located in the 200 block of South Main Street in Sycamore. It was constructed in 1906 and remains much the same today as it was 1912. McAllister was a successful dry goods dealer whose longtime business in the Daniel Pierce Building evolved into the later Henderson's Department Store in downtown Sycamore.

=== William Robinson House ===
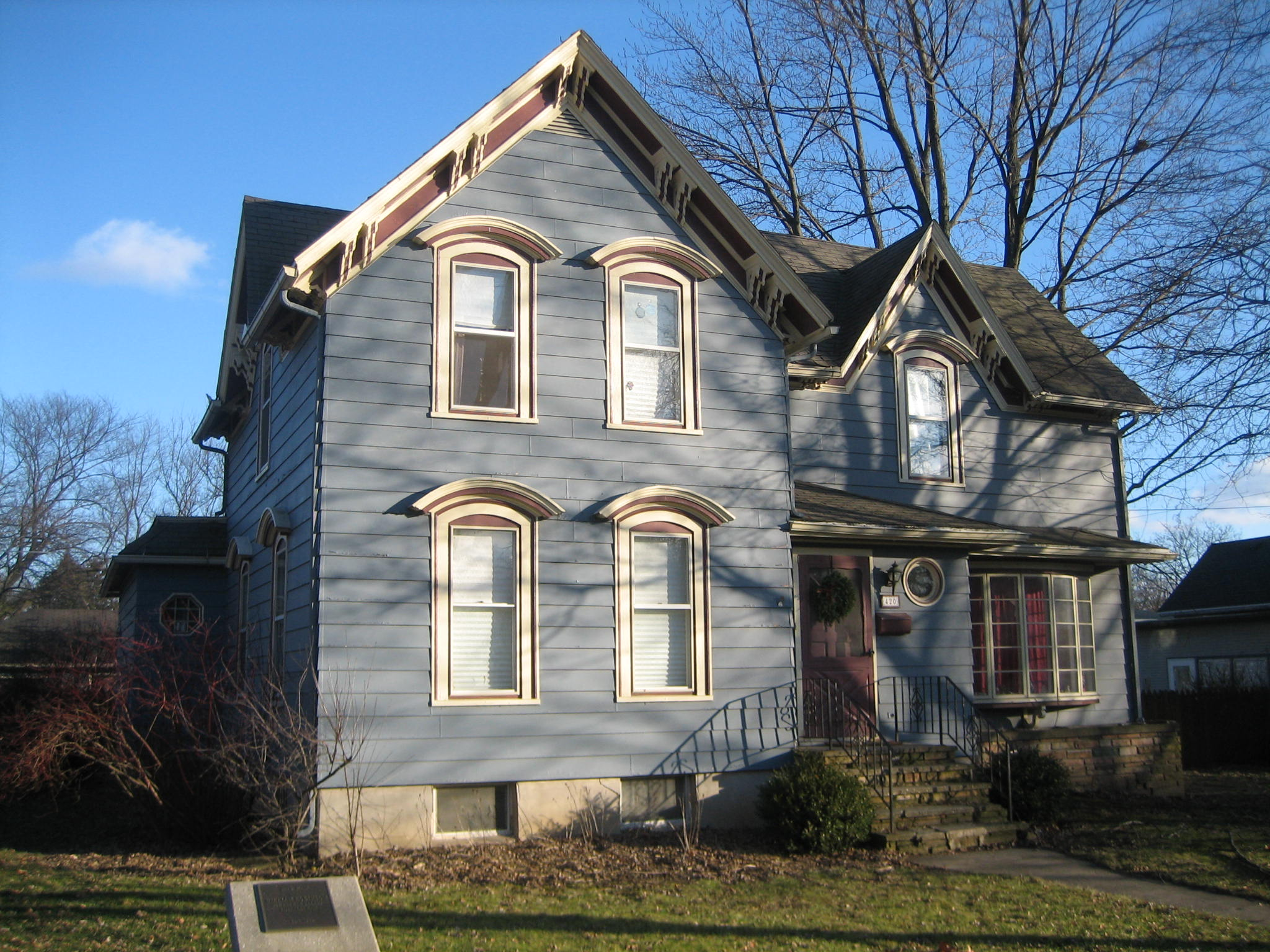
Robinson House

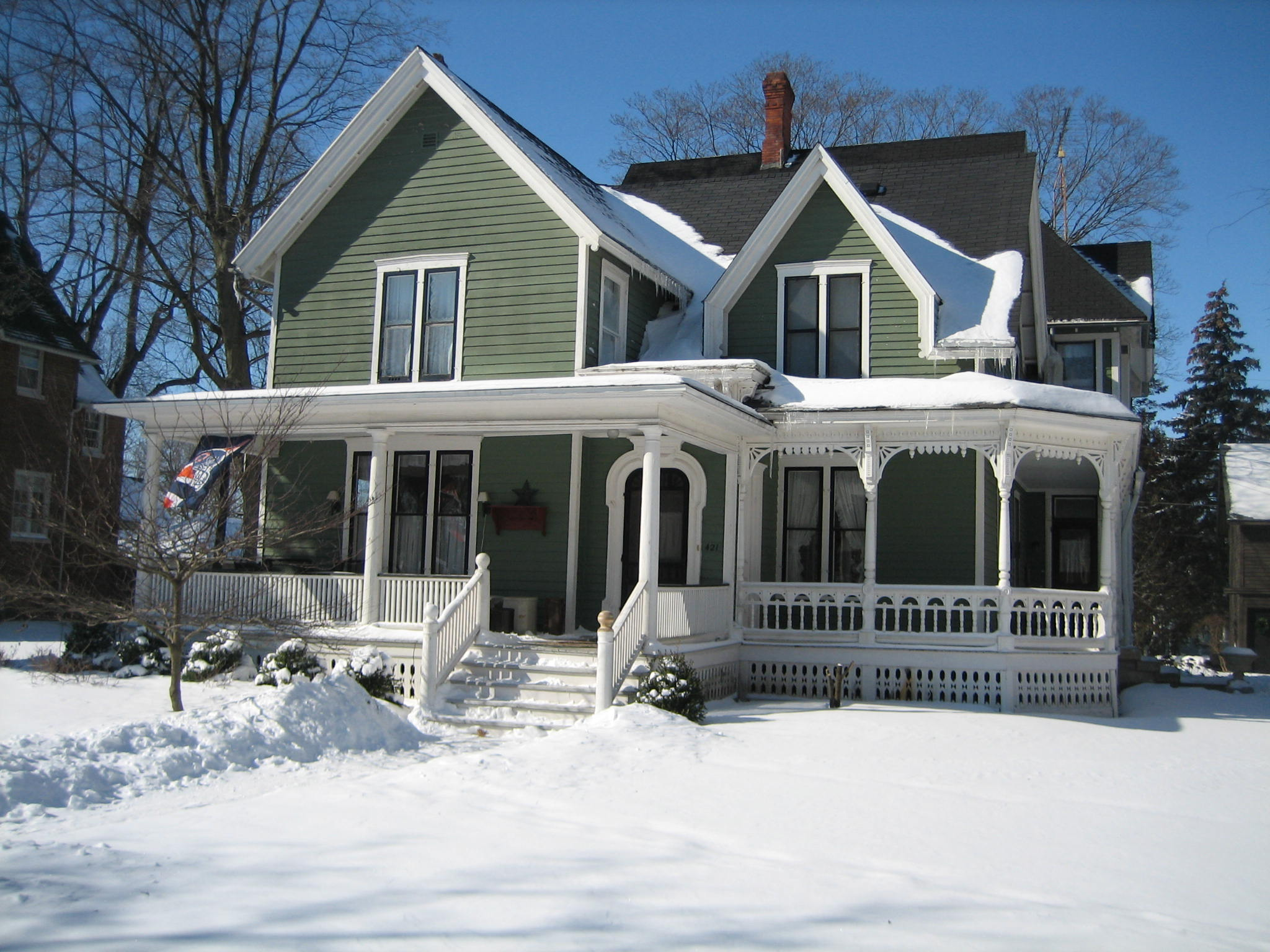
Abram Ellwood House

The William Robinson House was constructed in 1874. It stands in the 400 block of South Main Street in Sycamore is designed in a mostly Gothic Revival style. Robinson was an entrepreneur, dealing in threshing equipment and farm implements. On New Year's Day, 1897 he turned over his successful business to his son George E. Robinson.

== Ellwood family ==
There are three houses within the district that were owned by various members of the Ellwood family, famed for their affiliation with barbed wire through Isaac Ellwood. The Abram Ellwood House is in the 400 block of Somonauk Street. Further down the street, in the 700 block of Somonauk, is the James Ellwood House. The James Ellwood House was constructed in 1859. It was moved from its original location, about a block away, in 1989. Since that time the home has been fully restored. The home is designed in Shingle style, a subtype of Queen Anne Style architecture. James Ellwood worked in the pharmacy and grocery business in Sycamore for 23 years. Before he became Sycamore Postmaster from 1898 to 1908 he also worked for 17 years as treasurer of Reuben Ellwood Manufacturing.The 1859 Chauncey Ellwood House, a prominent Italianate home, is in Somonauk Street's 800 block.

== Other houses ==
The Charles O. Boynton House is an 1887 Queen Anne style home which stands along Main Street, north of the DeKalb County Courthouse. Its distinctive red brick facade has aged fairly well and the porch is nearly exactly as it was in the late 19th century. Boynton was a dry goods dealer. On the adjacent property is the Frederick B. Townsend House. Townsend helped found the DeKalb County Farm Bureau and was a native of DeKalb County.

At least two other contributing houses are found south of the Boynton and Townsend Houses. The D. B. James House is a c. 1860 home located on Exchange Street directly behind the DeKalb County Courthouse, it is one of the oldest homes on that block. James was a Sycamore attorney, coincidentally, the house now holds a law office. Along Somonauk Street is another of the district's elegant examples of Queen Anne architecture, the David Syme House. The Somonauk Street house was designed by George Garnsey of Chicago and constructed around 1880.

== See also ==
Other structure in the district

- Charles O. Boynton House
- Carlos Lattin House
- Churches in Sycamore Historic District
- Commercial buildings in Sycamore Historic District
- Frederick B. Townsend House
- David Syme House
- D.B. James House

Other registered places in DeKalb county

- Adolphus W. Brower House
- Ellwood House

Related articles

- American colonial architecture
- Georgian architecture
