= Chauncey Ellwood House =

- U.S. Historic district – Contributing property
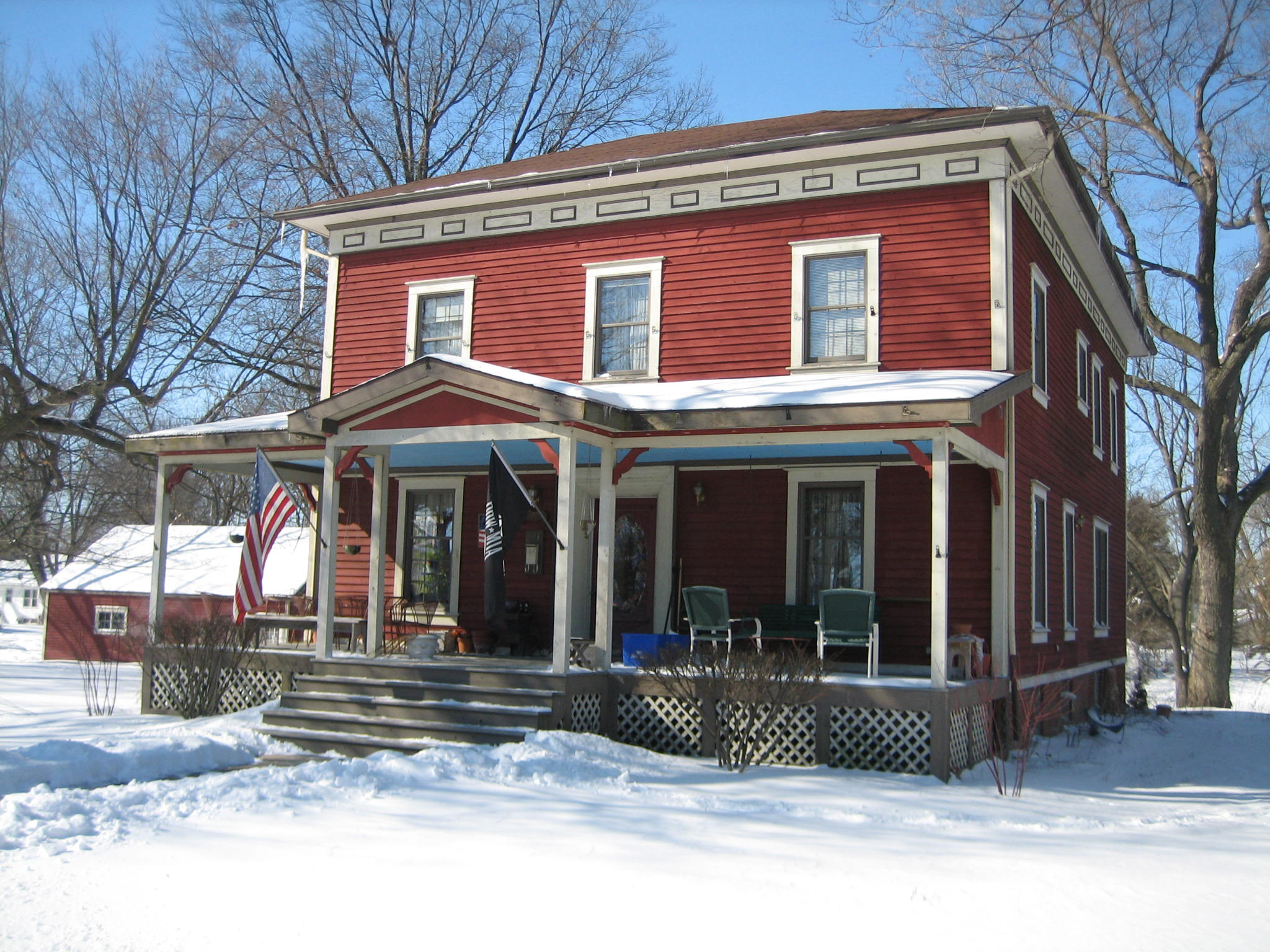

- Location within Illinois Location within the United States
- Location: Sycamore, DeKalb County, Illinois, USA
- Coordinates: 41°59′2″N 88°41′39″W
- Built: 1859
- Architectural style: Italianate
- Part of: Sycamore Historic District (ID8003104)
- Added to NRHP: May 2, 1978

The Chauncey Ellwood House is a 19th-century Italianate residence in the DeKalb County, Illinois city of Sycamore. It is a contributing property to the Sycamore Historic District; added to the National Register of Historic Places in 1978. The house is in the 800 block of Somonauk Street. The Esther Mae Nesbitt House, next door, was once the carriage house for the home.

== House ==
The Chauncey Ellwood House is designed in Italianate style, today, painted a distinctive red color. A large pond occupies the backyard and the Esther Mae Nesbitt House lies adjacent; to the northwest of the house. The house bears a full-length front porch supported by four bracketed wooden columns. On the front wall of the Chauncey Ellwood House two additional wooden supports are anchored at either end of the porch. A small triangular pediment overhangs the front stairs. The current front porch is not an original. Photographs taken between 1971 and 1975 show that the original porch stretched not only the entire length of the front facade but continued around the house the full length of the north face. In the older set up the stairs were set at the far south end of the house instead of centered, as they are today.

== Chauncey Ellwood ==
Chauncey Ellwood was the older brother of barbed wire entrepreneur Isaac Ellwood, a resident of nearby DeKalb, Illinois. Ellwood was an attorney, merchant and, for a time, mayor of Sycamore.

== Grounds ==
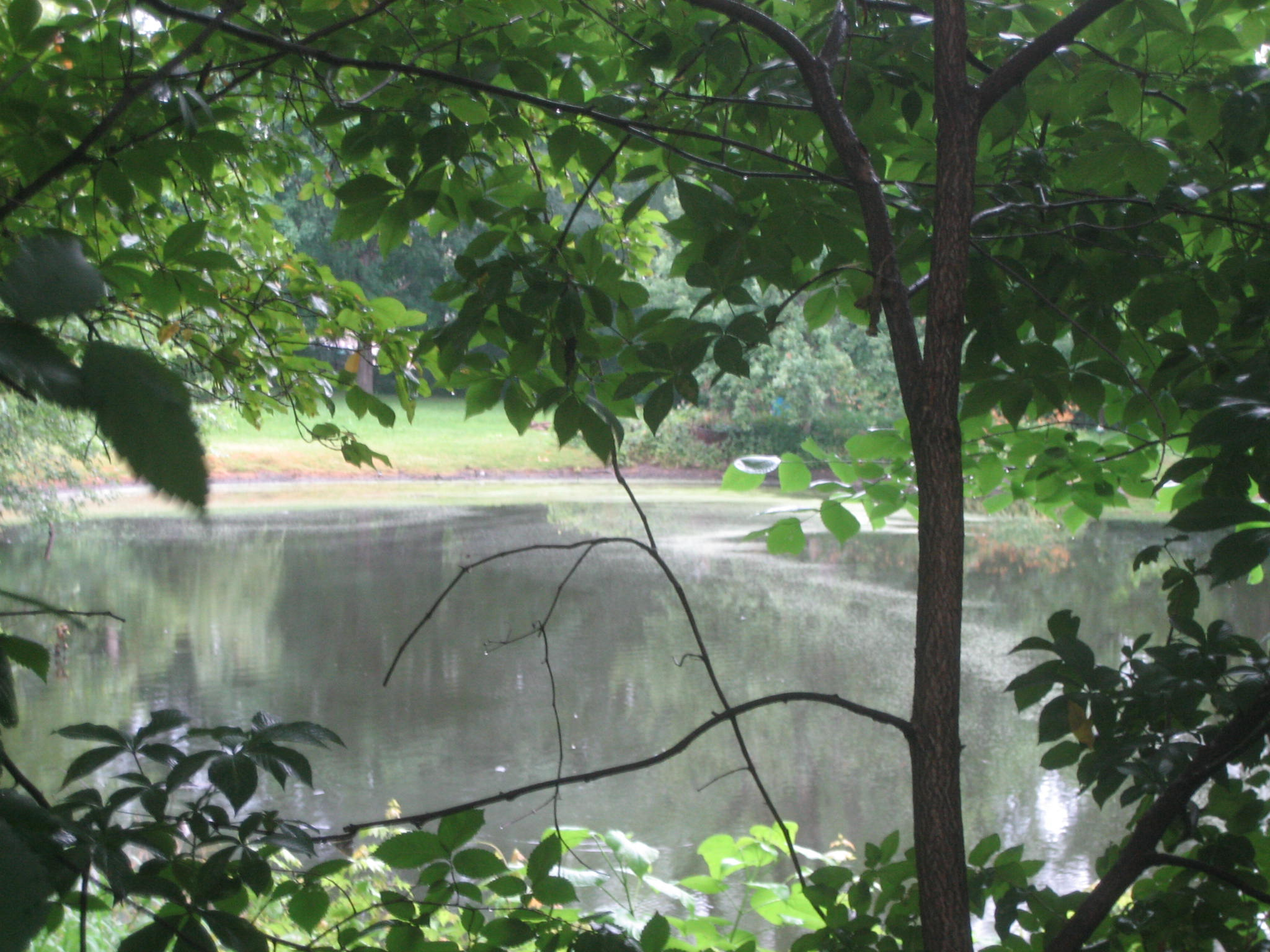
Patten's Pond in the backyard of the Chauncey Ellwood House.

The folklore of the Potawatomi tribe, which inhabited the area, held that the natural pond in the backyard was once a watering hole for native buffalo before the herds moved further west. During the 20th century the pond became known as Patten's Pond.

== See also ==
- Abram Ellwood House
- Ellwood House
- James Ellwood House
