= Frederick Townsend Garage =

- U.S. Historic district – Contributing property
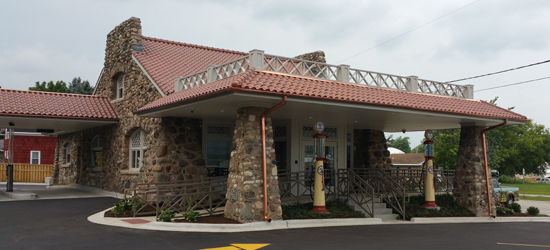
- Originally built to house "benzine vehicles", the Townsend Garage is now a community bank.
- Location: Sycamore, DeKalb County, Illinois
- Coordinates: 41°59′2″N 88°41′39″W
- Built: 1905
- Part of: Sycamore Historic District (ID778003104)
- Added to NRHP: May 2, 1978

The Frederick Townsend Garage is located in Sycamore, Illinois and is listed on the National Register of Historic Places as part of the Sycamore Historic District. It sits at the base of a small incline overlooked by the large Queen Anne style Townsend House. First a gas station, the building has been used by a number of restaurants since then. It was restored and remodeled for use as a community bank in 2016. The Sycamore Historic District was listed on the Register in May 1978.

== History ==
The distinctive stone structure was constructed in 1905 for use as a garage for the estate of Frederick B. Townsend, his former home is the Queen Anne mansion that overlooks the garage property. When it was first constructed the local newspaper, the Sycamore True Republican, stated that the building was meant to hold "benzine vehicle" owned by Townsend and his brother-in-law Elmer E. Boynton. The structure was erected at a cost of about $3,000 and made of granite rocks gathered from Townsend's farmland.

After the building left private ownership the property was exploited for commercial use and became a gas station. Despite the years and the changes in function the building's historical character remains intact. The front roof, over the canopy, has seen the most change. It was originally covered with red tile, matching the building. Also, the canopy is non-original but the pillars supporting are. The last gas station at the property closed in the early 1980s and it housed a restaurant until 2015.

In 2016, the garage was restored and remodeled by Resource Bank, N.A., and now serves as a community bank for the city of Sycamore.
