= George's Block =

- U.S. Historic district – Contributing property
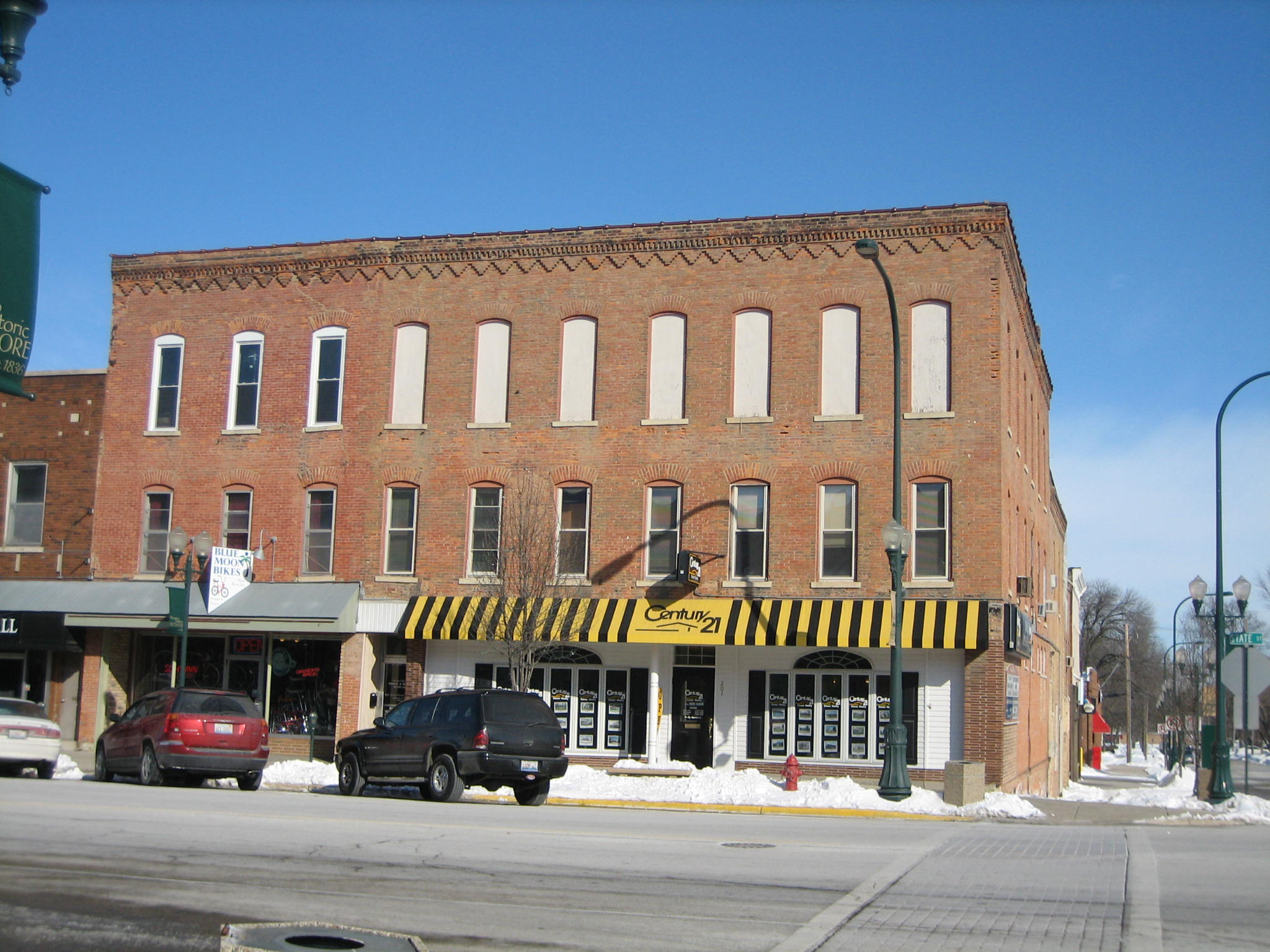
- Many of the windows on George's Block have been replaced or boarded up.
- Location: Sycamore, DeKalb County, Illinois
- Coordinates: 41°59′2″N 88°41′39″W
- Built: 1857
- Part of: Sycamore Historic District (ID78003104)
- Added to NRHP: May 2, 1978

The George's Block, once known as the James Block, is a 19th-century structure located in Sycamore, Illinois, along Illinois Route 64 (State Street) as it passes through the DeKalb County seat. The Block is part of the Sycamore Historic District and as such is listed on the National Register of Historic Places. The district joined the Register in May 1978. The building dates from 1857 when it was owned by Daniel P. James but by the 1860s the building has become known as George's Block.

== History ==
The George's Block began its life in 1857 and was then known as the James Block, after the owner Daniel P. James. James, a prominent citizen, lived in the nearby Jerkin-roofed D. B. James House, also part of the Sycamore Historic District. By the 1860s the James name was gone but the building was still known as a block. Many buildings of the period were known as blocks, usually multi-story and multi-business, the buildings contained retail and professional space or, in the case of George's Block, lecture halls or auditoriums. The third floor of the George's Block, not in use as of 2007, contained a lecture hall where a wide variety of speakers from around the United States would come for presentations. In the first year the building existed such famous men as Horace Greeley, Charles Sumner and Bayard Taylor spoke there.

== Architecture ==
The George's Block has undergone several changes through the years. Even before the turn of the 20th Century a partial balcony, that had been in place below the second-floor windows of the three-story structure, was gone. It is thought that this balcony probably crossed the entire State Street facade of the building. After the turn of the century the balcony had been replaced with awnings. The original brick cornice remains intact. The first floor level once held a variety of storefronts, on both the State and Maple Street sides of the building. Today the building is mostly converted for use as a real estate office. Windows have been slowly replaced or removed over time. The real estate office windows are somewhat in the spirit of the originals and the areas where windows once were on the Maple Street side of the building have long since been bricked over. On the upper floors the double hung windows have been replaced with single pane sashes. Of the 16 third floor windows only three are present, the other thirteen were boarded up through the decades.
