= Frederick B. Townsend House =

Historic house in Illinois, United States

- U.S. Historic district – Contributing property
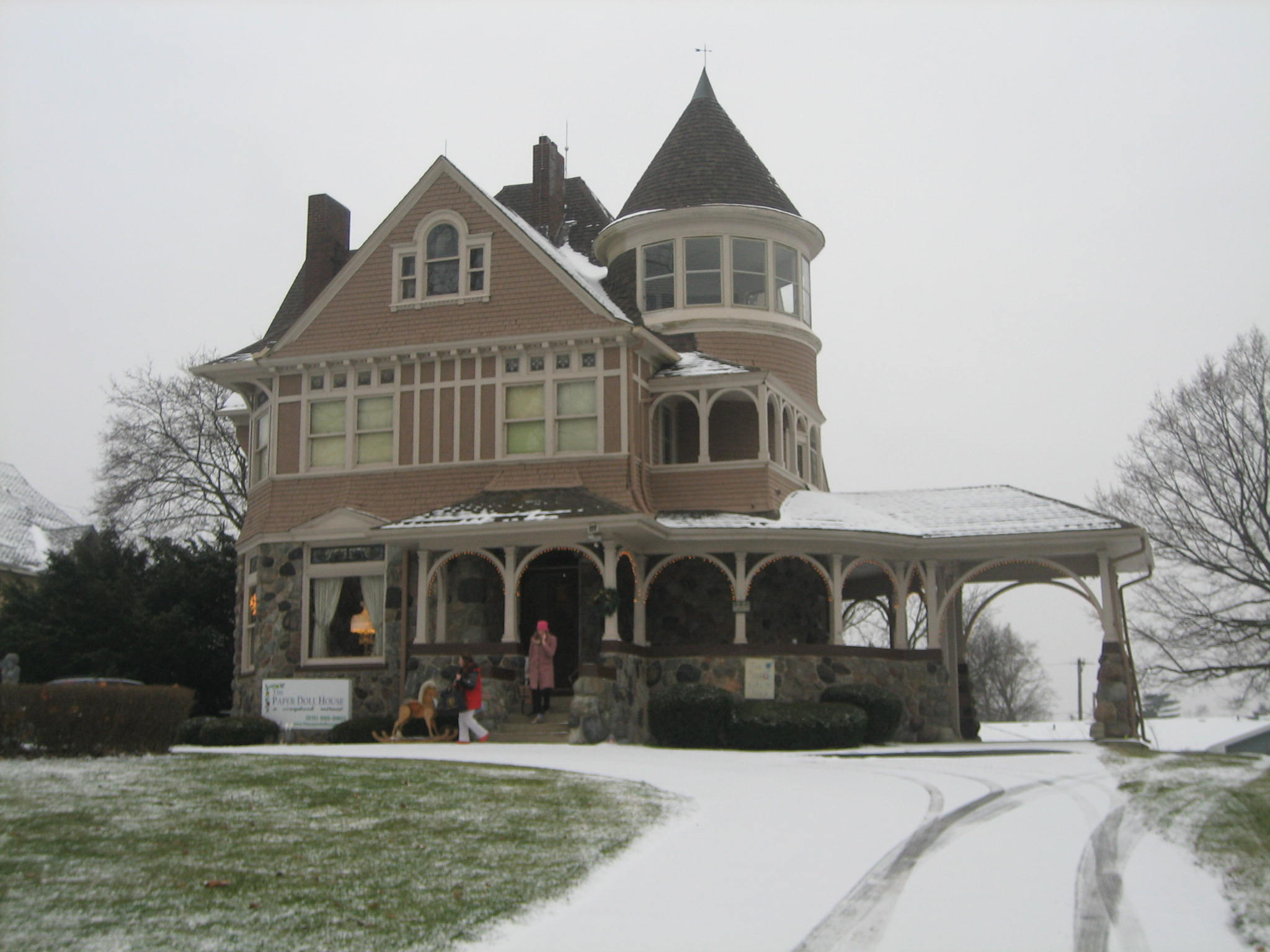
- Today, the elegant Townsend House is occupied by a bed and breakfast.
- Location: Sycamore, DeKalb County, Illinois, USA
- Coordinates: 41°59′2″N 88°41′39″W
- Built: c. 1890-92
- Architect: William J. McAlpine
- Architectural style: Queen Anne
- Part of: Sycamore Historic District (ID78003104)
- Added to NRHP: May 2, 1978

The Frederick B. Townsend House is located in the DeKalb County, Illinois county seat of Sycamore. The home is within the boundaries of the Sycamore Historic District. The district was designated and listed on the National Register of Historic Places in May 1978. The Queen Anne style home was designed and constructed in 1890 or 1892 by the same architect and general contractor responsible for Altgeld Hall at Northern Illinois University and the nearby DeKalb County Courthouse, as well as the courthouse in Lee County.

== Frederick B. Townsend ==
Frederick B. Townsend was born in Malta Township, DeKalb County, Illinois in 1858. This native son belonged to an elite family tree that included such prominent residents as Daniel Pierce, his maternal grandfather, who founded the National Bank & Trust Co. in 1867. Townsend married Mary Boynton, the daughter of a lender and land speculator in 1890. They eventually became parents to Charles and Eleanor. Eleanor Townsend married Thomas H. Roberts of Clinton Township in 1920. Roberts would go on to found DeKalb Ag, a company later known as DeKalb Genetics Corp. and bearer of the famous corn ear DeKalb logo. That company merged with Monsanto Company in 1998.

Townsend was active as a local community leader and served in a variety of positions. At one time or another Townsend was mayor of Sycamore, county judge and instrumental in keeping Sycamore the DeKalb County seat when the courthouse was reconstructed in the early 20th century.

== History ==
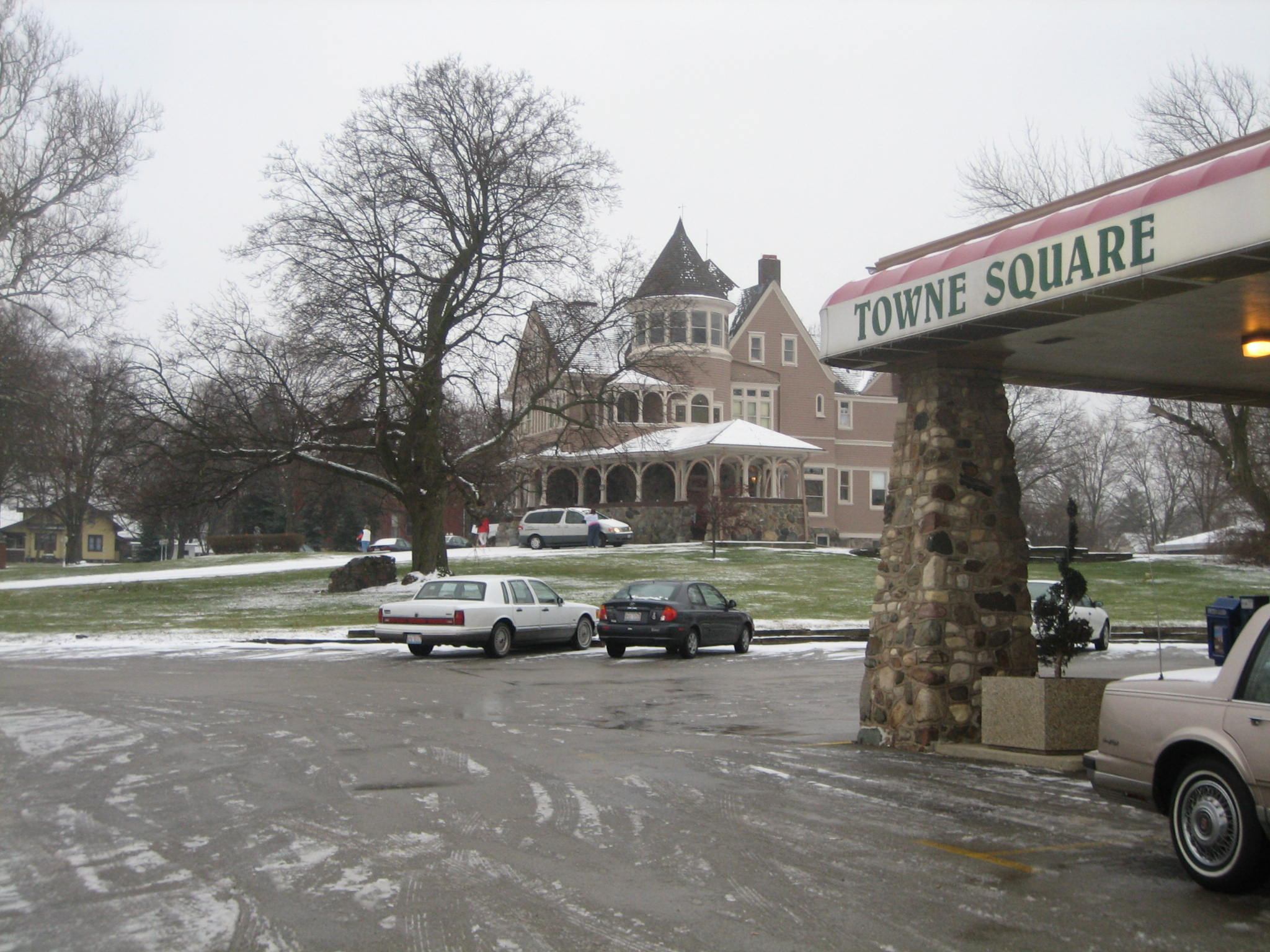
The Townsend House viewed from the lot of what was once the Townsend Garage.

Local legend has it that the house was given as a dowry of sorts to Frederick Townsend and his new bride, Mary Boynton, by her father, Charles O. Boynton, in 1890. However, newspaper articles from 1892 indicate that the mansion was new at that time.

== Architecture ==
The Townsend House, much like the Townsend Garage, a short distance from the mansion, incorporates granite boulders collected from Townsend's many DeKalb County farms. Unlike the Garage, however, only the lower portion of the house and porch facade and the foundation utilizes the boulders. The large granite porch wraps around the house from the front door, the porch includes a porte-cochere and is topped with wooden pillars. Transoms of leaded or stained glass can found on many of the first floor windows. A balcony is on the second floor where the structure has a multi-gabled roof. Both the east and south gables have large Palladian windows. The south gable has what has been termed an "M-roof." The enclosed turret is capped with a conical roof and is accessible only from the home's attic.
