= List of contributing properties in the Sycamore Historic District =

The properties on this List of contributing properties (Sycamore Historic District) are part of the National Register of Historic Places. They joined the Register when the Sycamore Historic District, in Sycamore, Illinois, was designated in 1978.

== Churches ==
- First Baptist Church (Sycamore, Illinois)
- St. Mary's Roman Catholic Church (Sycamore, Illinois)
- St. Peter's Episcopal Church (Sycamore, Illinois)
- Old Congregational Church (Sycamore, Illinois)

== Demolished structures ==
- 116 S. Somonauk St.
- 503 S. Somonauk St.
- Evangelical Lutheran Church of St. John
- United Methodist Church (Sycamore, Illinois)

== Government ==
- Civil War Memorial (Sycamore, Illinois)
- DeKalb County Courthouse (Illinois)
- Old East School
- Sycamore Public Library
- U.S. Post Office (Sycamore, Illinois)

== Houses ==
- 124 W. Ottawa
- 134 W. Ottawa
- 202 S. Maple
- 312 S. Somonauk St.
- 314 S. Main St.
- 328 S. Somonauk St.
- 413 S. Somonauk St.
- 418 W. High St.
- 437 S. Somonauk St.
- 512 S. Main St.
- Abram Ellwood House
- Byers-Faissler House
- Captain R.A. Smith House
- Carlos Lattin House
- Chappell-Whittemore House
- Charles A. Bishop House
- Charles Kellum House
- Charles O. Boynton House
- Chauncey Ellwood House
- David DeGraff House
- David Syme House
- D. B. James House
- Dr. Clark House
- Dr. Orlando M. Bryan House
- Dr. Olin H. Smith House
- Elmore Cooper House
- Esther Mae Nesbitt House
- Floyd E. Brower House
- Frederick B. Townsend House
- General Daniel Dustin House
- George P. Wild House
- George S. Robinson-Ellzey Young House
- Henry Garbutt House
- Hosea Willard House
- James Ellwood House
- J.H Rogers House
- J.H. Rogers/Bettis House
- Peter Johnsen Rooming House
- Row houses (Sycamore, Illinois)
- Stephens House
- Universalist Church/Arthur Stark House
- Wally Thurow House
- William McAllister House
- William Robinson House (Sycamore, Illinois)

== Other structures ==
- 156 W. State St.
- Central Block (Sycamore, Illinois)
- Charles O. Boyton Carriage House
- Citizens National Bank Building
- Court Building (Sycamore, Illinois)
- Daniel Pierce Building
- Frederick Townsend Garage
- George's Block
- National Bank & Trust Co.
- Old Sycamore Hospital
- State Street Theatre
- Stratford Inn
- Townsend Building (Sycamore, Illinois)
- Waterman Block
