= Churches in Sycamore Historic District =

Churches in historic Sycamore, Illinois, United States

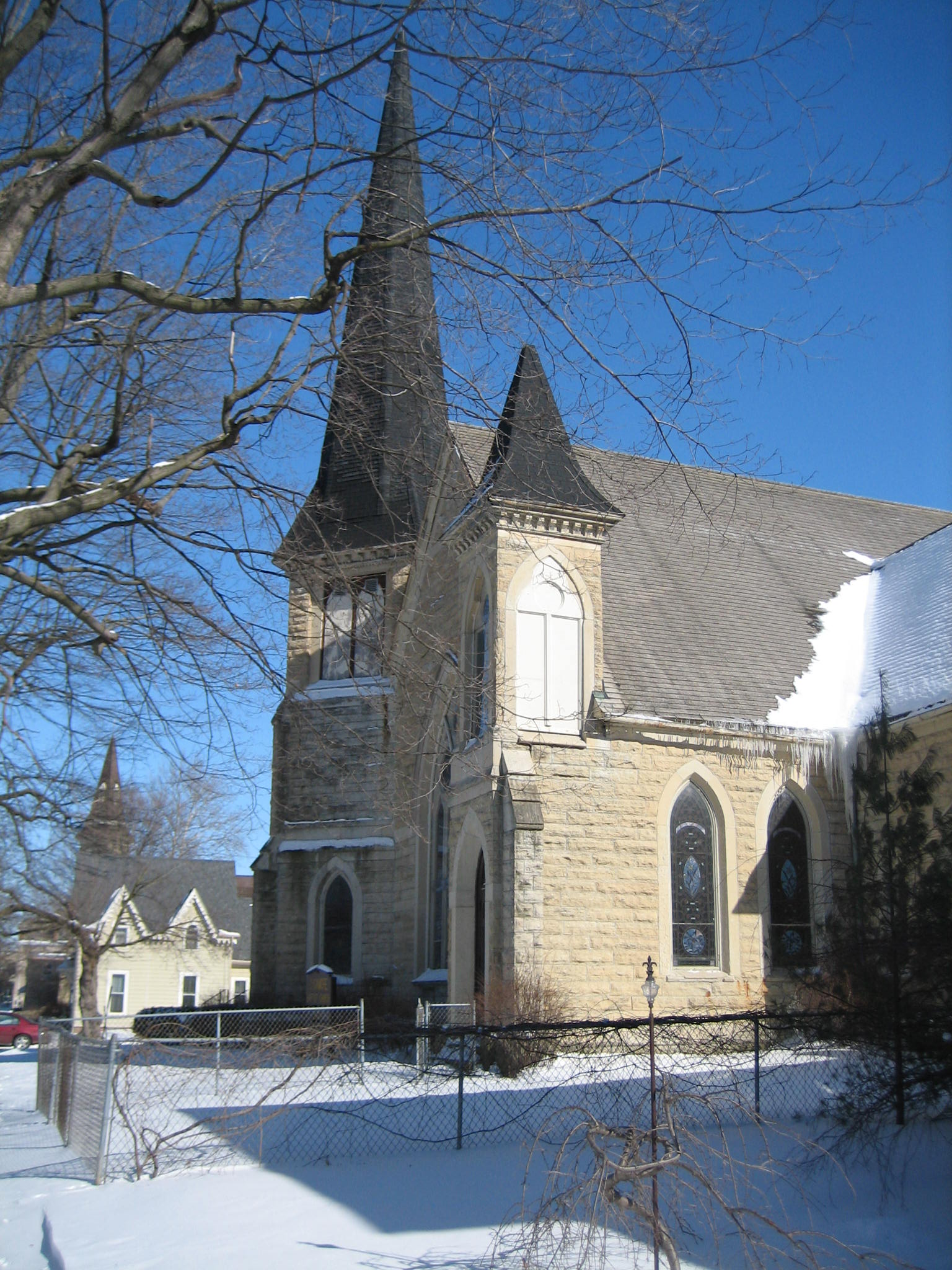
There are five extant churches in the district including the Old Congregational Church, designed by George O. Garnsey.

As of 2007 there are five church buildings in the Sycamore Historic District, located in Sycamore, Illinois, United States, which are listed as contributing properties to the district. The Sycamore Historic District was added to the U.S. National Register of Historic Places on May 2, 1978. When it was nominated to join the National Register there were seven church buildings within the district. One of those included is a residential structure that was utilized as a church when it was first constructed; the Arthur Stark House was once home to the Sycamore Universalist Church congregation. In the time since its listing, two churches have been destroyed or demolished. The Evangelical Lutheran Church of St. John was destroyed by fire in 2004 and the United Methodist Church in Sycamore is no longer extant, replaced by a modern office building.

== Evangelical Lutheran Church of St. John ==
The Evangelical Lutheran Church of St. John formerly stood on Main Street in the Sycamore Historic District until it was "totally destroyed" by fire in February 2004. The 1937–38 building was one of the most notable structures within the historic district. Even as the church burned it made its mark on history. The fire's resulting backdraft caused an explosion and is the largest recorded backdraft incident in United States history. Two Sycamore firefighters were injured in the blaze.

In addition to the destroyed St. John's church the Sycamore United Methodist Church, listed as a contributing property to the historic district in 1978 no longer exists. The area along Somonauk Street where it once stood now houses an office building.

== First Baptist Church ==
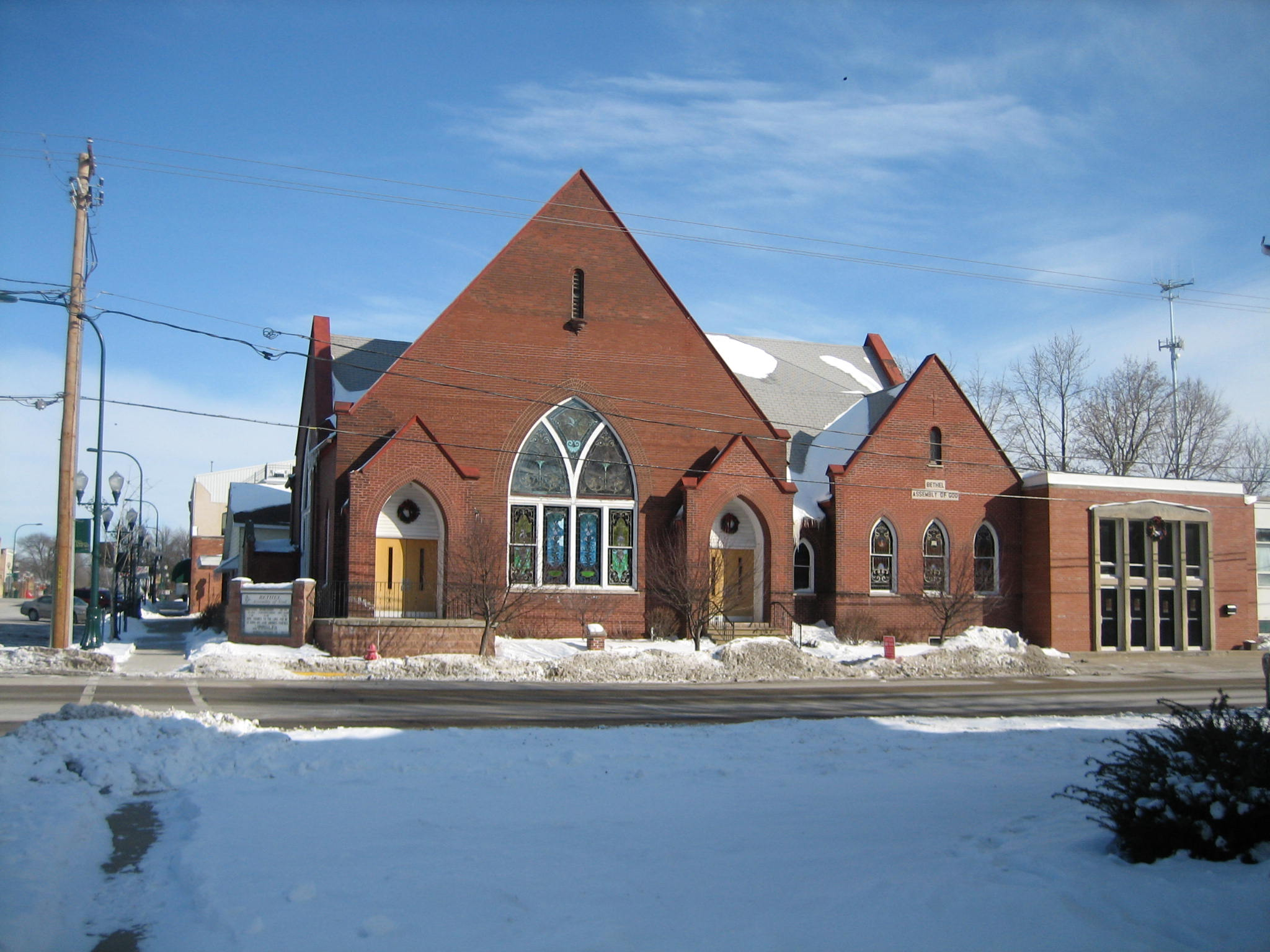
First Baptist Church

The First Baptist Church in Sycamore, Illinois, is within the boundaries of the Sycamore Historic District and considered a contributing property to the historic district. As of 2007 the old First Baptist Church building was occupied by the Bethel Assembly of God. The First Baptist Church's congregation was founded in 1852. In their early years they met in Franklin Township and then, later at Sycamore's schoolhouse and in the DeKalb County Courthouse. Finally the church decided it needed a permanent building. The First Baptist Church building, erected in 1899, stands at the corner of Maple and Elm Streets in Sycamore, on a lot that was originally purchased from local citizen Hosea Willard. Built in the Gothic Revival style the church features prominently arched windows. On both the west and south facades it feature large stained glass windows.

== St. Mary's Roman Catholic Church ==
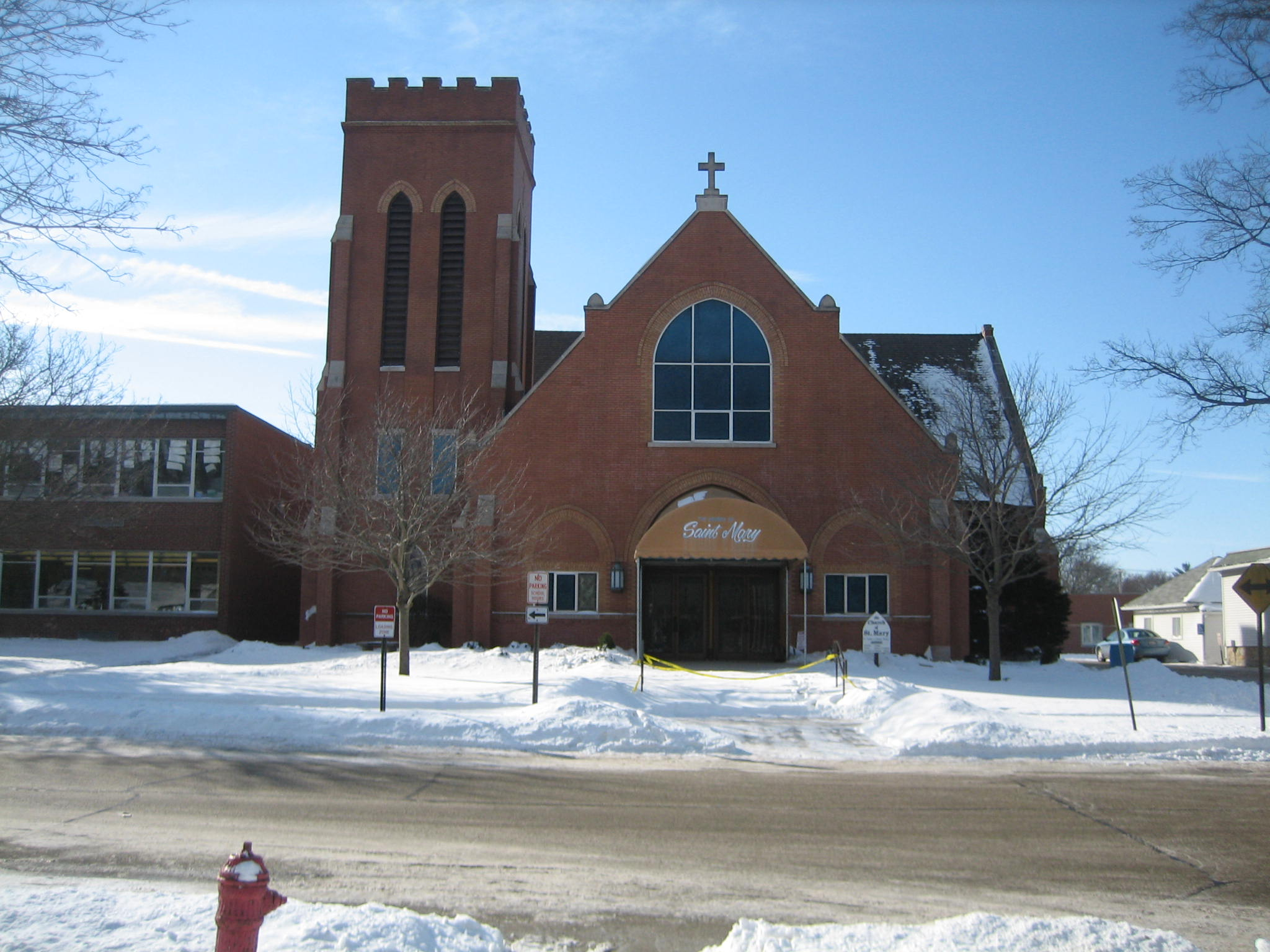
St. Mary's Roman Catholic Church

St. Mary's Roman Catholic Church in Sycamore, Illinois, is considered a contributing structure to the historic integrity of the district and is one of seven Sycamore churches that were integral parts of the historic district when it was nominated for the National Register of Historic Places.

== St. Peter's Episcopal Church ==
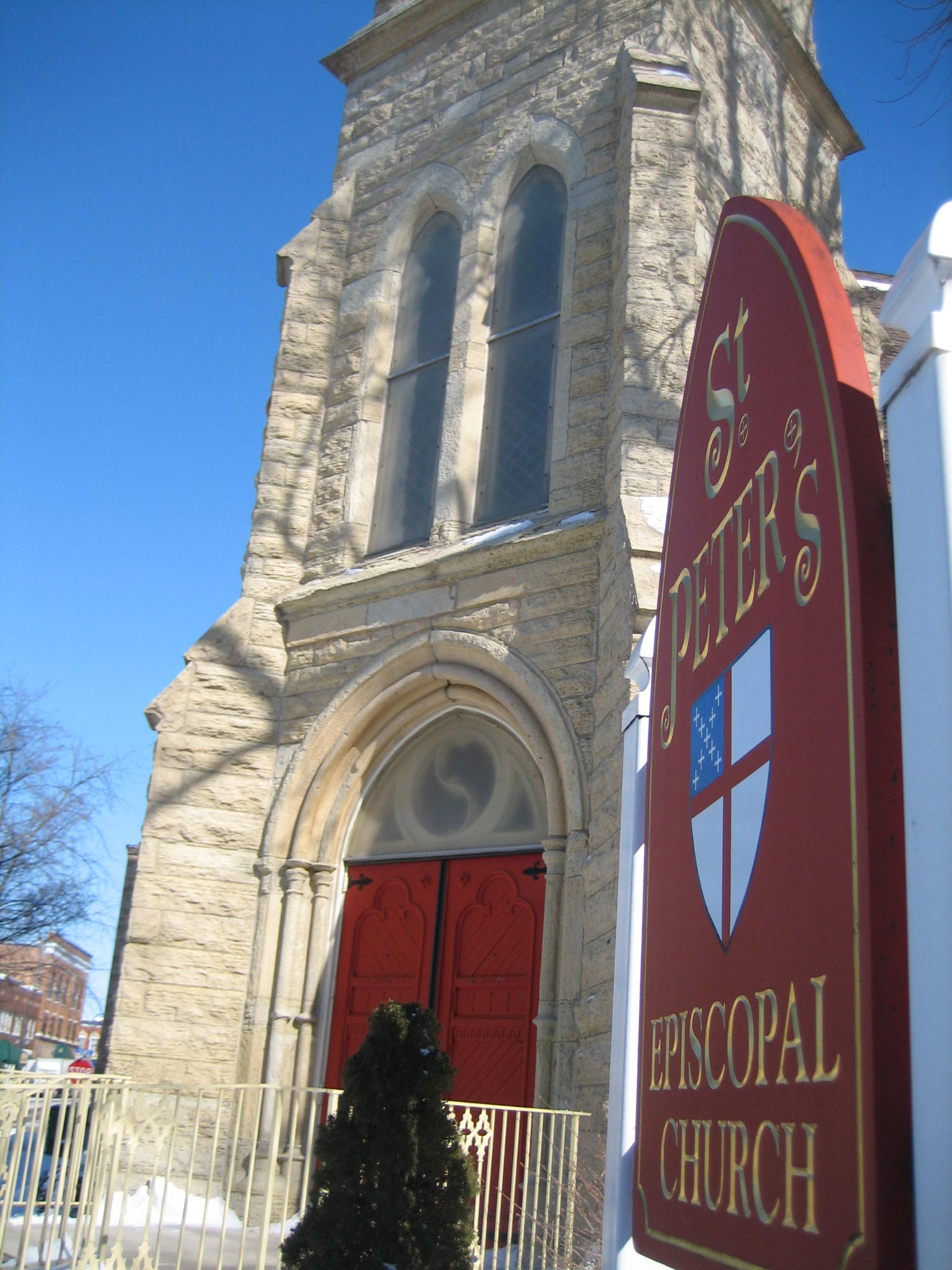
St. Peter's Episcopal Church

The Sycamore, Illinois St. Peter's Episcopal Church is listed as another contributing structure to the overall historic integrity of the Sycamore Historic District. The historic district was designated in 1978 when it joined the National Register of Historic Places. The church building was designed by Chicago architect George O. Garnsey. It was erected in 1878 and consecrated in 1879 as a memorial to its primary benefactor Sycamore businessman James Waterman. Waterman paid the entire $17,000 construction cost himself. The building is said to be the oldest church in DeKalb County. Constructed from Batavia stone the building's distinctive architectural integrity has been maintained through the years. It still features original walnut pews and stained glass.

== Old Congregational Church ==
Old Congregational Church, also known as Sycamore Baptist Church or First Congregational Church, is located at the corner of High and Somonauk Streets in Sycamore, Illinois.

The building, erected in 1884, was designed by Chicago architect George O. Garnsey. Garnsey designed several prominent structure in Sycamore and DeKalb, including the Ellwood House and the David Syme House. The plans for the church appeared in Garnsey's planbook journal, National Builder, at about the same time the building was constructed. After a 1978 lightning strike the building's main steeple underwent a renovation. Early church documents record members as staunchly abolitionists, having participated in the Underground Railroad as early as 1844. The building is designed in Victorian Gothic motif and its exterior is clad in stone.

== Universalist Church/Arthur Stark House ==
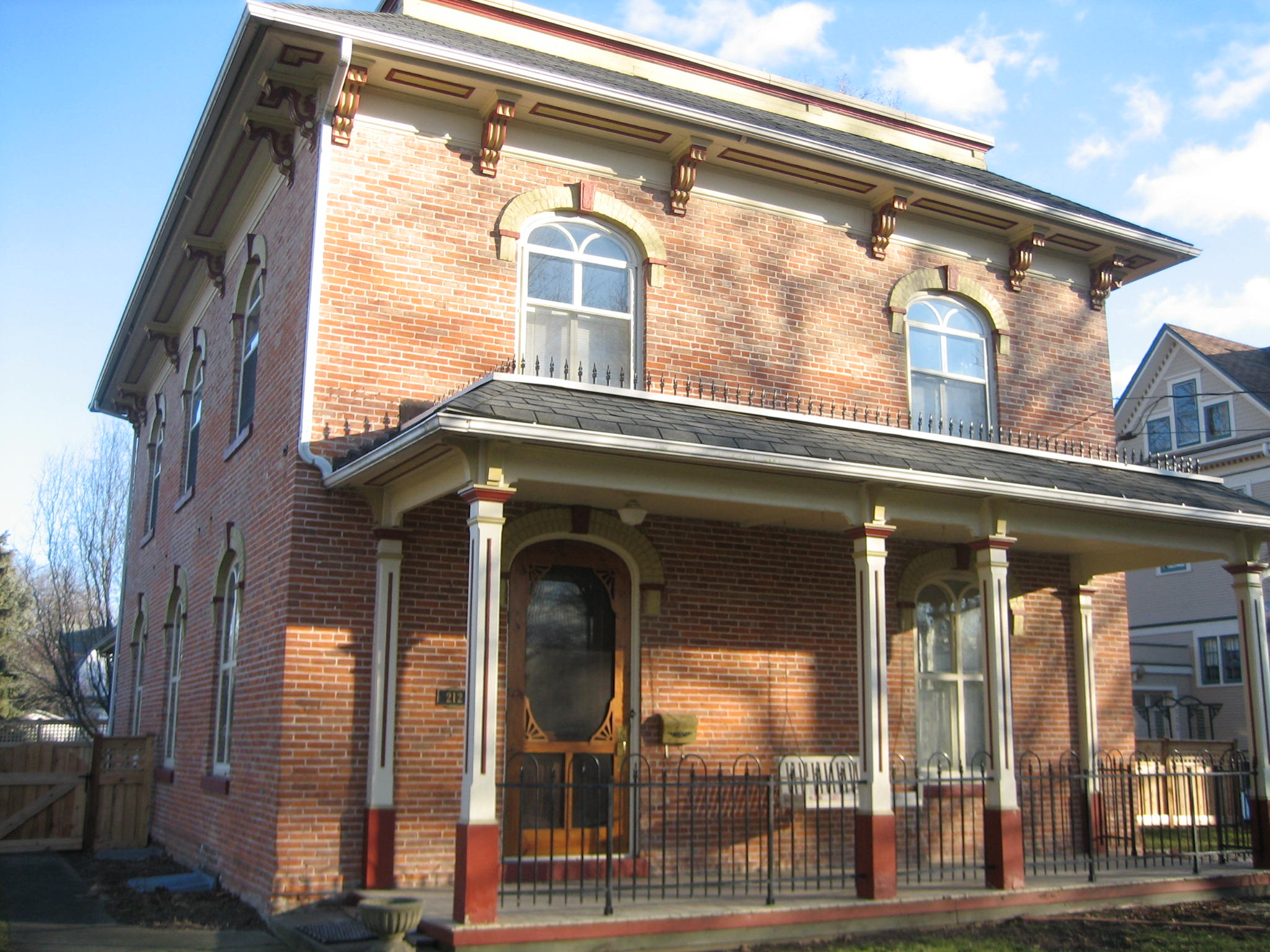
Stark House

The Universalist Church/Arthur Stark House is a residential structure in the DeKalb County, Illinois city of Sycamore. It is a contributing structure to the overall historic integrity of the Sycamore Historic District. This two-story Italianate home was constructed in 1855. Early in its history it served as the Universalist Church. Later, it was purchased by Arthur Stark, for whom it served as a residence.

Alonzo Ellwood, another member of the famed Ellwood family, was an original trustee for the Universalist Church, which once occupied this house. Before the Civil War the Universalist congregation was active in the abolitionist movement.

Arthur Stark turned the building into a livable home after the Universalist Church relocated. He remodeled the house adhering to the Italianate architecture in his remodel. Stark worked as secretary at Marsh Harvester, an important and early Sycamore industry.

== See also ==
- Charles O. Boynton House
- Commercial buildings in Sycamore Historic District
- Hosea Willard House
- Houses in Sycamore Historic District
- Isaac Ellwood
- Old Ogle County Courthouse
- Waterman Block
