= Boynton House =

Boynton House may refer to:

- Charles C. Boynton House, also known as the Temple of Wings, in Berkeley, California
- Charles O. Boynton House, in Sycamore, Illinois
  - Charles O. Boynton Carriage House
- Edward E. Boynton House, designed by Frank Lloyd Wright in Rochester, New York
- Hale-Boynton House, in Newbury, Massachusetts
