= Old Sycamore Hospital =

- U.S. Historic district – Contributing property
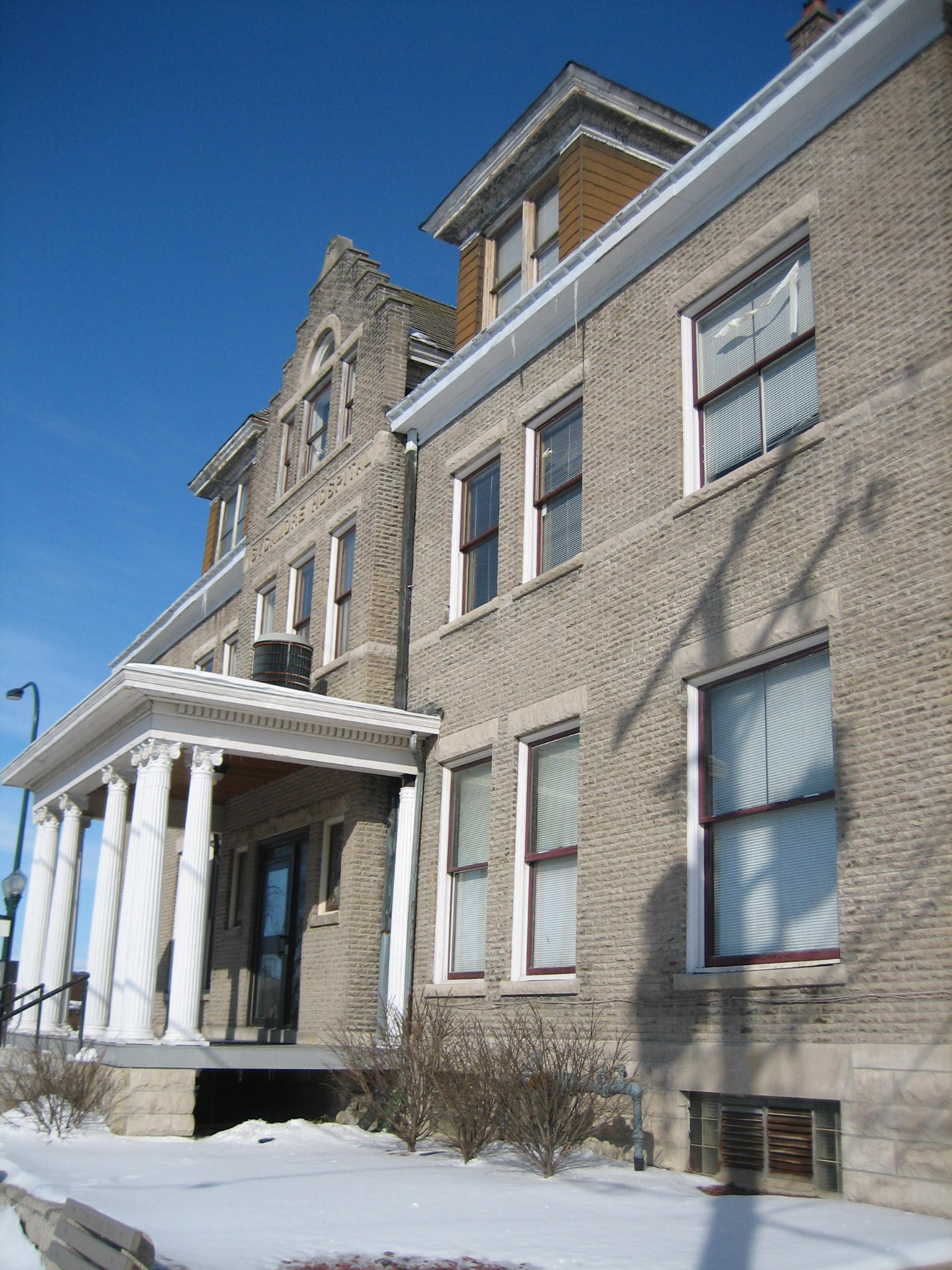
- Location: Sycamore, DeKalb County, Illinois
- Coordinates: 41°59′2″N 88°41′39″W
- Area: Sycamore Historic District
- Built: 1899
- Architect: Letitia A. Westgate
- Part of: Sycamore Historic District (ID78003104)
- Added to NRHP: May 2, 1978

Old Sycamore Hospital is two-story brick structure in downtown Sycamore, Illinois, United States. It is a contributing structure within the Sycamore Historic District. The district was established when it was added to the National Register of Historic Places in 1978. The hospital building is located at the corner of Elm and Somonauk Streets in Sycamore.

== History ==
The old hospital building was once home to the 1899, funded and designed by Letitia A. Westgate, at a total cost of $25,000. Westgate was Sycamore's first female physician. Sycamore Hospital, then known as Sycamore Surgical Hospital, was the first hospital in DeKalb County.

In late 1901 the hospital's future was in jeopardy, due to a medical malpractice suit. The city of Sycamore saw that the Sycamore Hospital building could become available on the open market. The city contacted Andrew Carnegie to request a $25,000 grant to purchase and remodel the hospital for use as a library. The city's request for the grant was ultimately approved, albeit for the construction of a new building across the street from the DeKalb County Courthouse.

Westgate left the Sycamore area by 1907 to become the city chemist in Aurora, Illinois. The hospital operated for another ten years but in 1917 the property was acquired by the Elks Club.
