= United States Post Office (Sycamore, Illinois) =

- U.S. Post Office
- U.S. Historic district – Contributing property
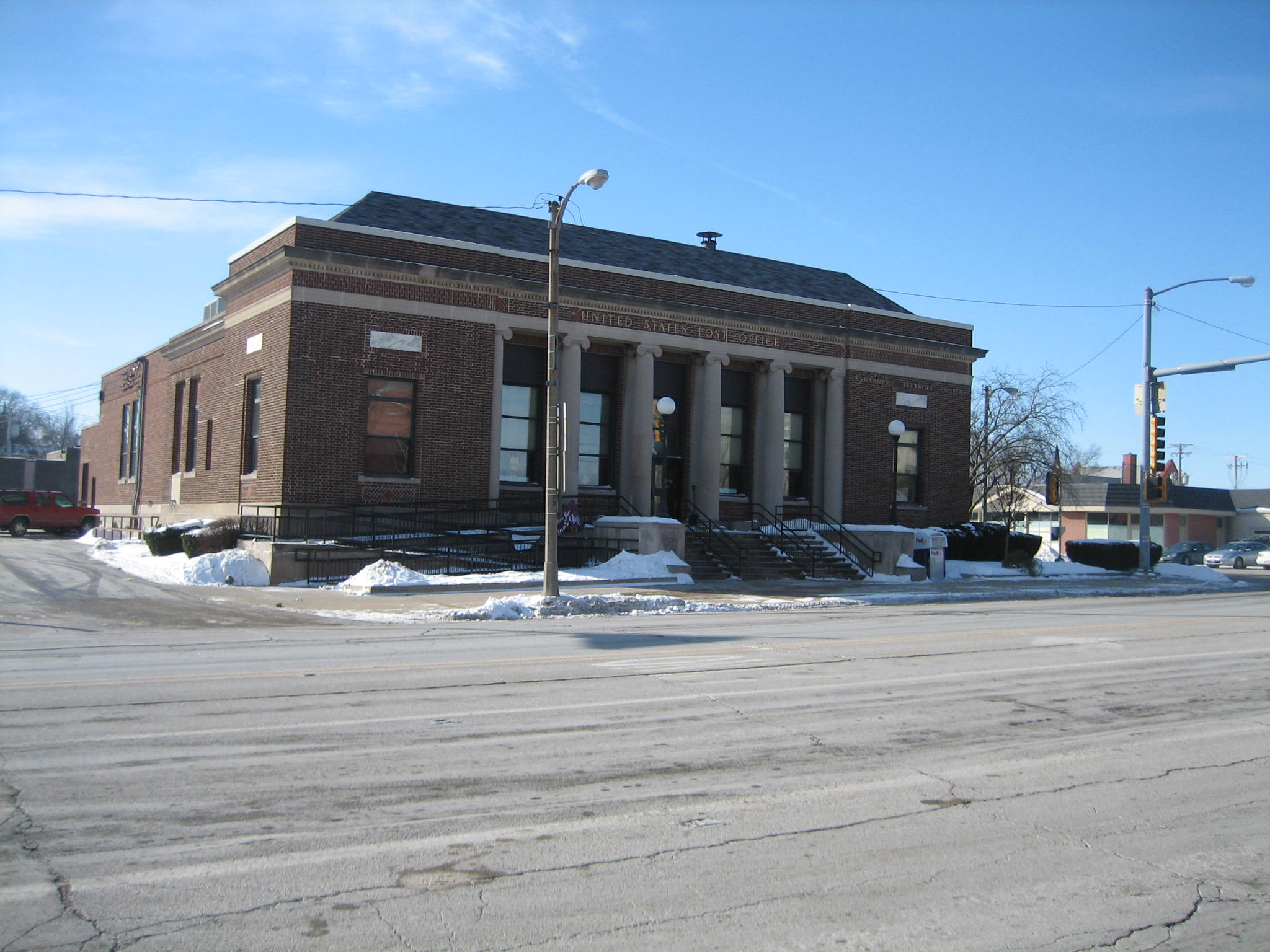
- The U.S. Post Office in Sycamore, Illinois, is part of the Sycamore Historic District.

- Location within Illinois Location within the United States
- Interactive map showing the location for U.S. Post Office-Sycamore
- Location: Sycamore, DeKalb County, Illinois
- Coordinates: 41°59′2″N 88°41′39″W
- Architectural style: Classical Revival
- Part of: Sycamore Historic District (ID78003104)
- Added to NRHP: May 2, 1978

The U.S. Post Office in Sycamore, Illinois, is listed on the National Register of Historic Places as part of the Sycamore Historic District. The district was designated and listed in May 1978. It stands directly across the street from another key structure in the district, the Sycamore Public Library and cross-corner from the district's largest structure, the DeKalb County Courthouse. It is open M-F from 8:30 am – 6:00 pm, Saturday from 9:00 am – 3:00 pm, and it is closed on Sunday.

== See also ==
- List of United States post offices
