= Peter Johnsen Rooming House =

Historic residential building in Illinois, United States

- U.S. Historic district – Contributing property
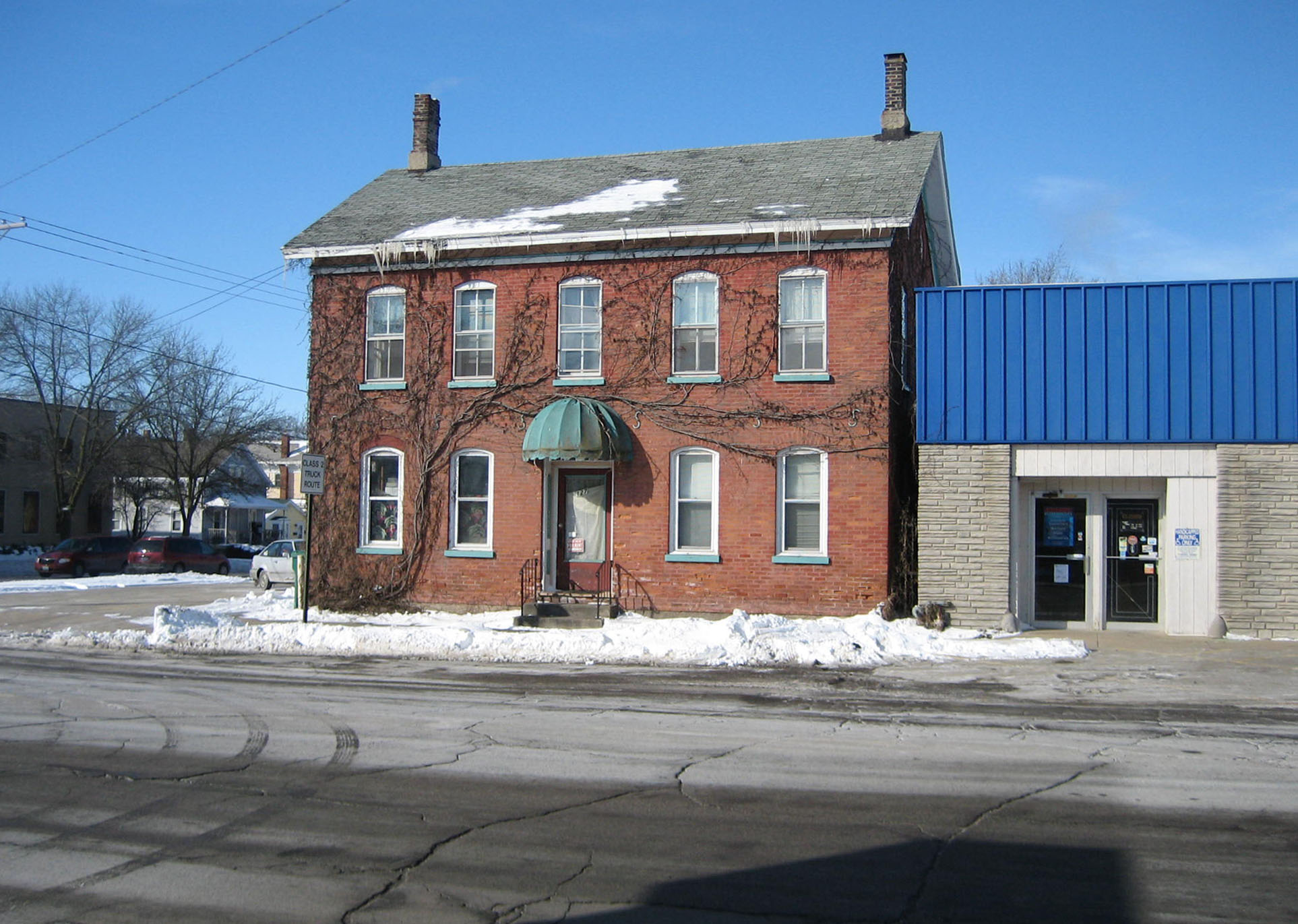
- Location: Sycamore, DeKalb County, Illinois
- Coordinates: 41°59′2″N 88°41′39″W
- Area: Sycamore Historic District
- Built: c. 1862-1876
- Part of: Sycamore Historic District (ID78003104)
- Added to NRHP: May 2, 1978

The Peter Johnsen Rooming House is an historic building near downtown Sycamore, Illinois. The red brick structure stands in the 100 block of South Main Street and is considered a contributing structure to the overall historic integrity of the Sycamore Historic District. The district was added to the National Register of Historic Places in May 1978.

== History ==
Very little is known about the building's namesake, Peter Johnsen. Constructed sometime between 1862 and 1876 the Johnsen Rooming House served as a boarding house from its construction until sometime in the 1970s, when it was converted for use as apartments. It is known that in the early 20th century a couple with the surname Heidikelin owned and operated the boarding house. They were remembered for their meals which were said to regularly attract townsfolk to the rooming house.
