= George O. Garnsey =

American architect

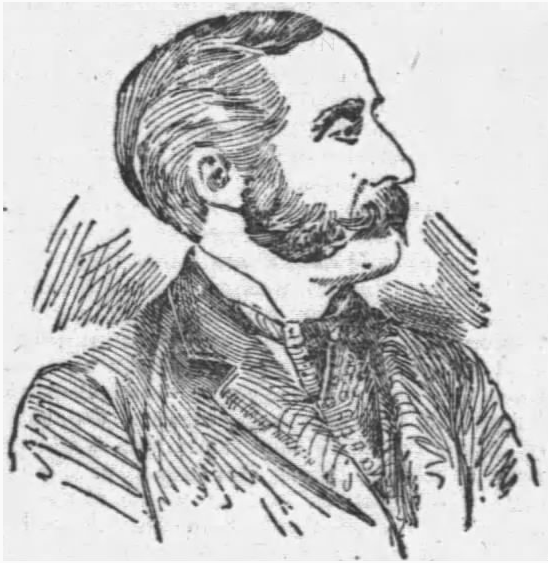
- Born: 1840; Rock Island, Illinois
- Died: 1923 (aged 82–83)
- Occupation: Architect

George O. Garnsey (1840–1923) was an American architect from the city of Chicago, known for his large picturesque Queen Anne style homes.

== Early life ==
Garnsey was born in Rock Island, Illinois in 1840 and was educated at a private school in New York; in 1852 his parents brought him to Chicago.

== Career ==
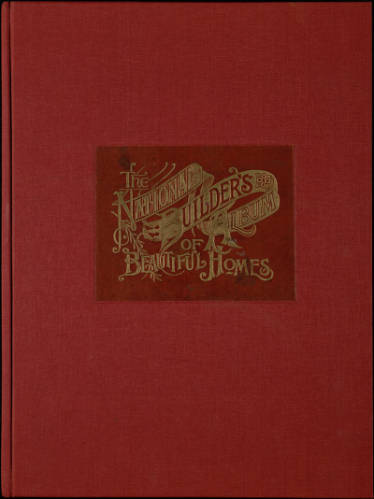
National Builder – front cover

After coming to Chicago, he went to work with J.C. Rankin as a draftsman; only 16 at the time, Garnsey stayed with Rankin until 1861. He worked briefly in partnerships and for other architectural firms before going into business as a sole proprietor in 1868. That same year Garnsey published his American Glossary of Architectural Terms. In 1869 Garnsey helped design the Illinois State Capitol building in Springfield.

After the Great Chicago Fire in 1871, Garnsey helped to redesign many of the buildings in the city and established a national reputation for theater and opera house design. From 1885 until 1893 he edited National Builder, a journal where he published many of the designs for the buildings he worked on. In 1923 he was commissioned by the National Bonding and Developing Company to build a new city on the site of an old US military installation on the Santa Fe Railroad in New Mexico.

One of Garnsey's opera houses is being preserved in Menominee, Michigan.

In Wisconsin, Garnsey was associated with John C. Cochraine in the design of Memorial Hall (1867) at Beloit College in the Near East Side Historical District. Garnsey was the architect for the Shearer-Cristy House (1891) in Waupaca, Wisconsin and the Clawson-Condon House (1890) in Brodhead, Wisconsin. Both homes are examples of Queen Anne pattern book design.

== See also ==
- Charles O. Boynton House
- David Syme House
- Ellwood House
- Kosciusko County Jail
- Menominee Opera House
- Ogle County Courthouse
- Old Congregational Church (Sycamore, Illinois)
