= Row houses (Sycamore, Illinois) =

Historic house in Illinois, United States

- Row Houses
- U.S. Historic district – Contributing property
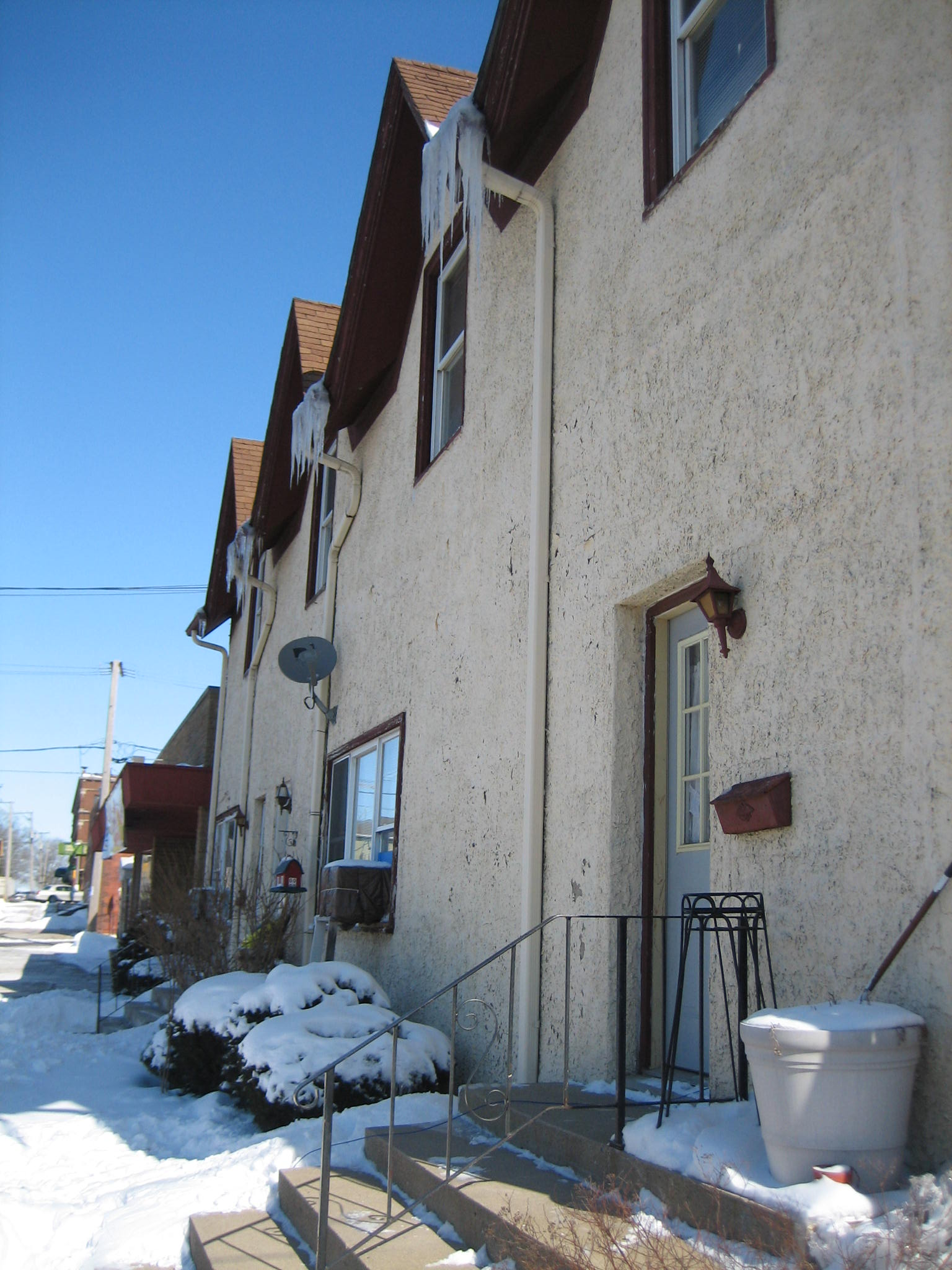
- The Sycamore, Illinois Row Houses consist of four units.
- Location: Sycamore, DeKalb County, Illinois
- Coordinates: 41°59′2″N 88°41′39″W
- Architectural style: Terraced house
- Part of: Sycamore Historic District (ID78003104)
- Added to NRHP: May 2, 1978

The Row Houses in Sycamore, Illinois are a small collection of historic terraced homes near the city's downtown. The building is considered by the National Register of Historic Places to be a contributing structure to the overall historic nature of the Sycamore Historic District. The district was added to the Register in May 1978. The buildings stand on the corner of Elm and California Streets in Sycamore.
