= Charles O. Boynton Carriage House =

- U.S. Historic district – Contributing property
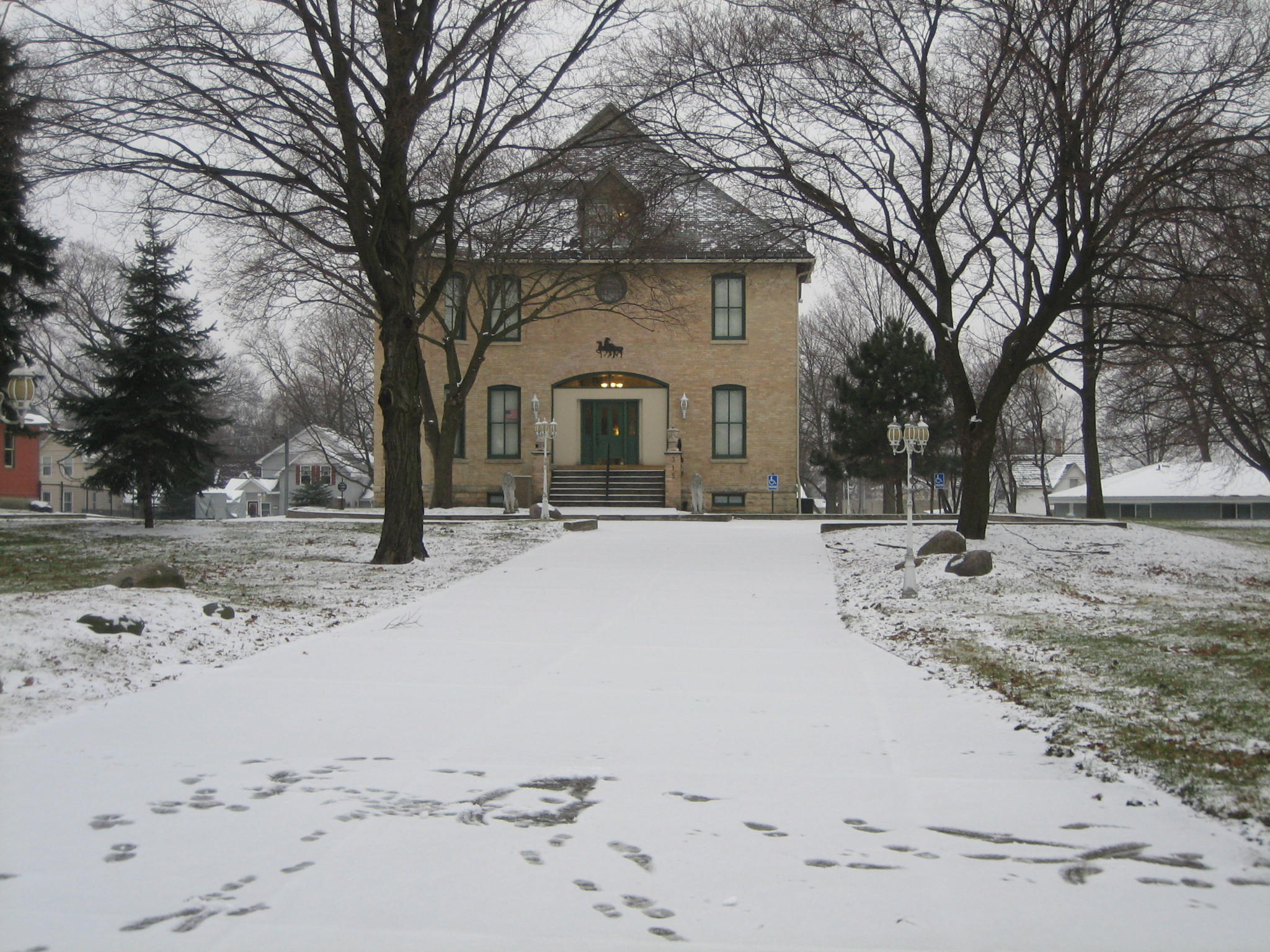

- Location within Illinois Location within the United States
- Location: Sycamore, DeKalb County, Illinois, USA
- Coordinates: 41°59′2″N 88°41′39″W
- Built: 1887
- Part of: Sycamore Historic District (ID78003104)
- Added to NRHP: May 2, 1978

The Charles O. Boynton Carriage House is located in the Sycamore Historic District in Sycamore, Illinois. The Sycamore Historic District was added to the National Register of Historic Places in 1978. The Carriage House is considered one of more than 150 contributing properties to the overall historic integrity of the district.

== History ==
The carriage house was built at the same time as the Queen Anne residence, next door, of Sycamore businessman and land speculator, Charles O. Boynton, in 1887. The home and the carriage house were held as one property until the Charles O. Boynton House was sold out of the Boynton family in 1986. At that time the building was converted for use as office space, a function it still served in 2007.
