= Carlos Lattin House =

Historic house in Illinois, United States

- U.S. Historic district – Contributing property
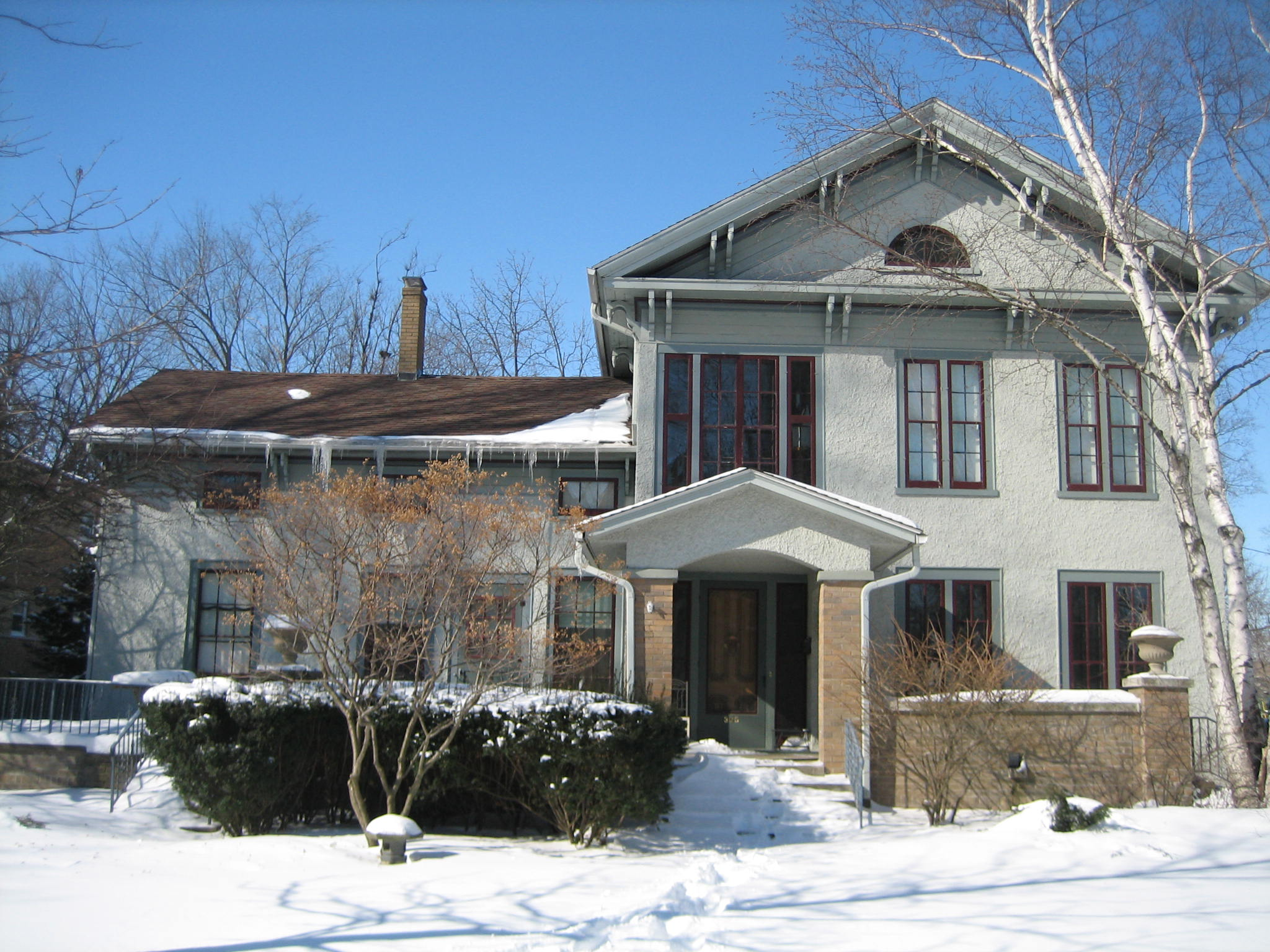
- Location: Sycamore, DeKalb County, Illinois, USA
- Coordinates: 41°59′2″N 88°41′39″W
- Built: 1854
- Architectural style: Greek Revival
- Part of: Sycamore Historic District (ID78003104)
- Added to NRHP: May 2, 1978

The Carlos Lattin House was built by Sycamore, Illinois' first permanent settler, Carlos Lattin. It lies within the boundaries of the Sycamore Historic District and is listed as one of the contributing structures in the district. The Sycamore Historic District was added to the National Register of Historic Places in 1978.

== History ==
The house, in the 300 block of Somonauk Street in Sycamore, was erected in 1854 by the city's first permanent settler, Carlos Lattin, who arrived in Sycamore in 1835. He prospered as a farmer and grain and lumber dealer, worked as a correspondent for the Chicago Democrat, that city's first newspaper, and served as DeKalb County treasurer.

== Architecture ==
The house is designed in the Greek Revival style and features exterior brick construction.
