= David Syme House =

Historic house in Illinois, United States

- U.S. Historic district – Contributing property
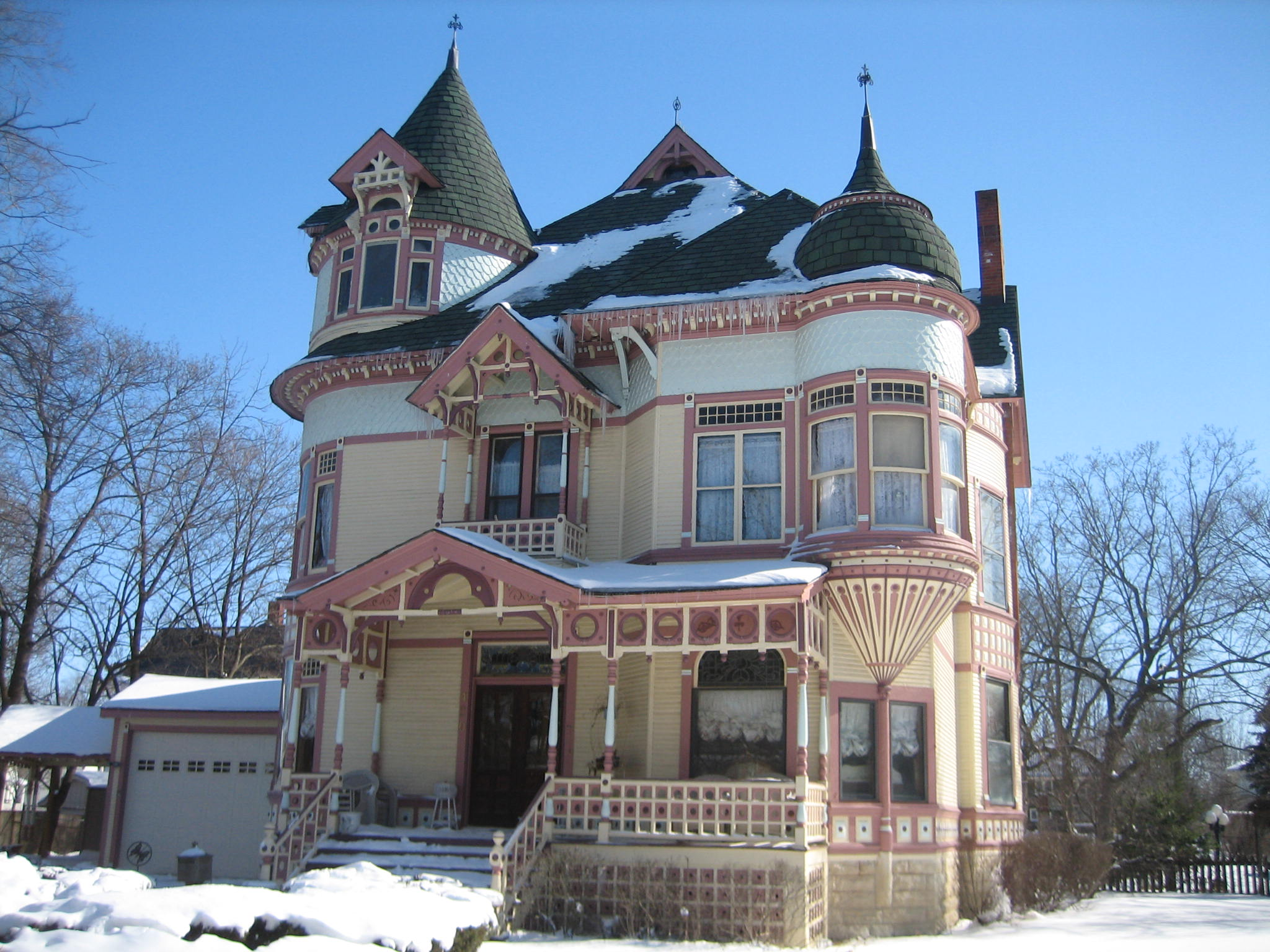
- The David Syme House has two distinctive turrets.
- Location: Sycamore, DeKalb County, Illinois, USA
- Coordinates: 41°59′2″N 88°41′39″W
- Built: c. 1880
- Architect: George O. Garnsey
- Architectural style: Queen Anne
- Part of: Sycamore Historic District (ID78003104)
- Added to NRHP: May 2, 1978

The David Syme House is located in Sycamore, Illinois and is part of the Sycamore Historic District. The district was listed on the National Register of Historic Places in May 1978. The Queen Anne style home was constructed circa 1880.

== History ==
David Syme arrived in Sycamore in 1868 and was president of Sycamore National Bank. During his tenure in Sycamore, Syme served as mayor and president of the school board. He often donated time and funds to the Sycamore Public Library, another building within the district. His home was constructed for about $8,000 around 1880. The architect, George O. Garnsey of Chicago, designed the home in the Queen Anne style, and published his design in May 1885. Other homes that used the same original design include the Jenkinson House in Port Huron, Michigan, built in 1889, the Shearer-Christy House in Waupaca, Wisconsin, built in 1892, and the McClure House in Los Angeles, California, built in 1887. Some of the home's features are its two, prominent turrets and stained glass windows.
