= Charles O. Boynton House =

Historic house in Illinois, United States

- U.S. Historic district – Contributing property
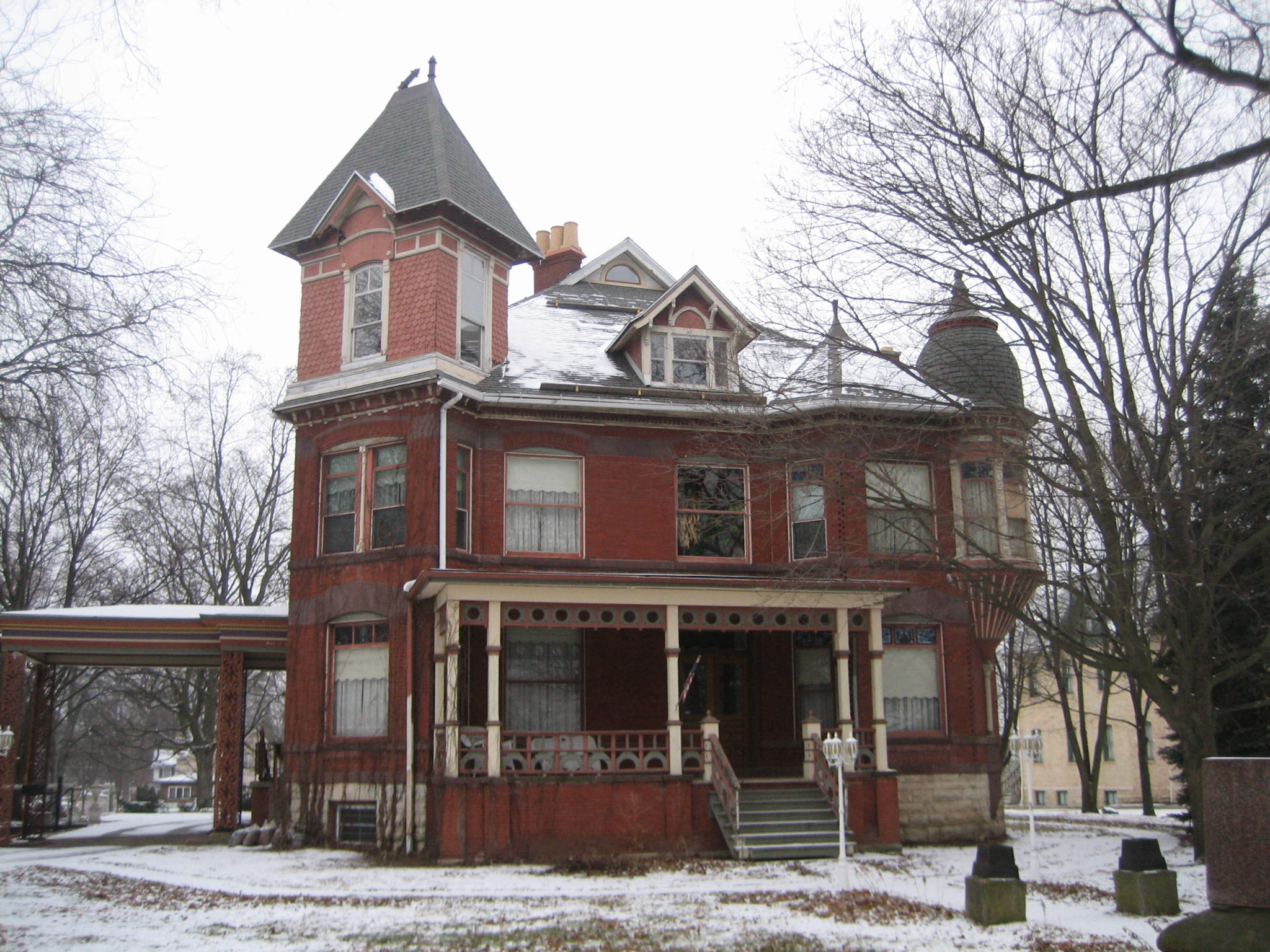
- The red brick facade of the Boynton House has aged fairly well.

- Location within Illinois Location within the United States
- Location: Sycamore, Illinois
- Coordinates: 41°59′2″N 88°41′39″W
- Area: 99 acres (40 ha)
- Built: 1887
- Architect: George O. Garnsey
- Architectural style: Queen Anne
- Part of: Sycamore Historic District (ID78003104)
- Added to NRHP: May 2, 1978

The Charles O. Boynton House is located in the DeKalb County, Illinois, city of Sycamore. The home is part of the Sycamore Historic District which was designated and listed on the National Register of Historic Places in May 1978. The Queen Anne style mansion sits on a stretch of Sycamore's Main Street that is dotted with other significant Historic District structures including, the Townsend House and the Townsend Garage. The Boynton House was designed by the same architect who designed the Ellwood House in nearby DeKalb and the David Syme House, another house in the Sycamore Historic District.

== C. O. Boynton ==
Charles O. Boynton was born in 1826 in Rockingham, Vermont. He came to Illinois in 1847 and opened a dry goods store in Chicago. Two years later he moved to Sycamore and opened another store, this time a general store. He began lending money in 1852 by obtaining capital from back East at lower interest rates and then lending locally at a higher rate. He did this until the early 1870s and made a significant amount of money.

After lending Boynton moved on to land speculation. Boynton owned farmland in DeKalb County as well as almost 75,000 acres (300 km^{2}) in Iowa, Kansas, Minnesota, North and South Dakota, and Arkansas. He held nearly 60,000 acres (240 km^{2}) of walnut forests in Arkansas where he owned a lumber mill.

== History ==
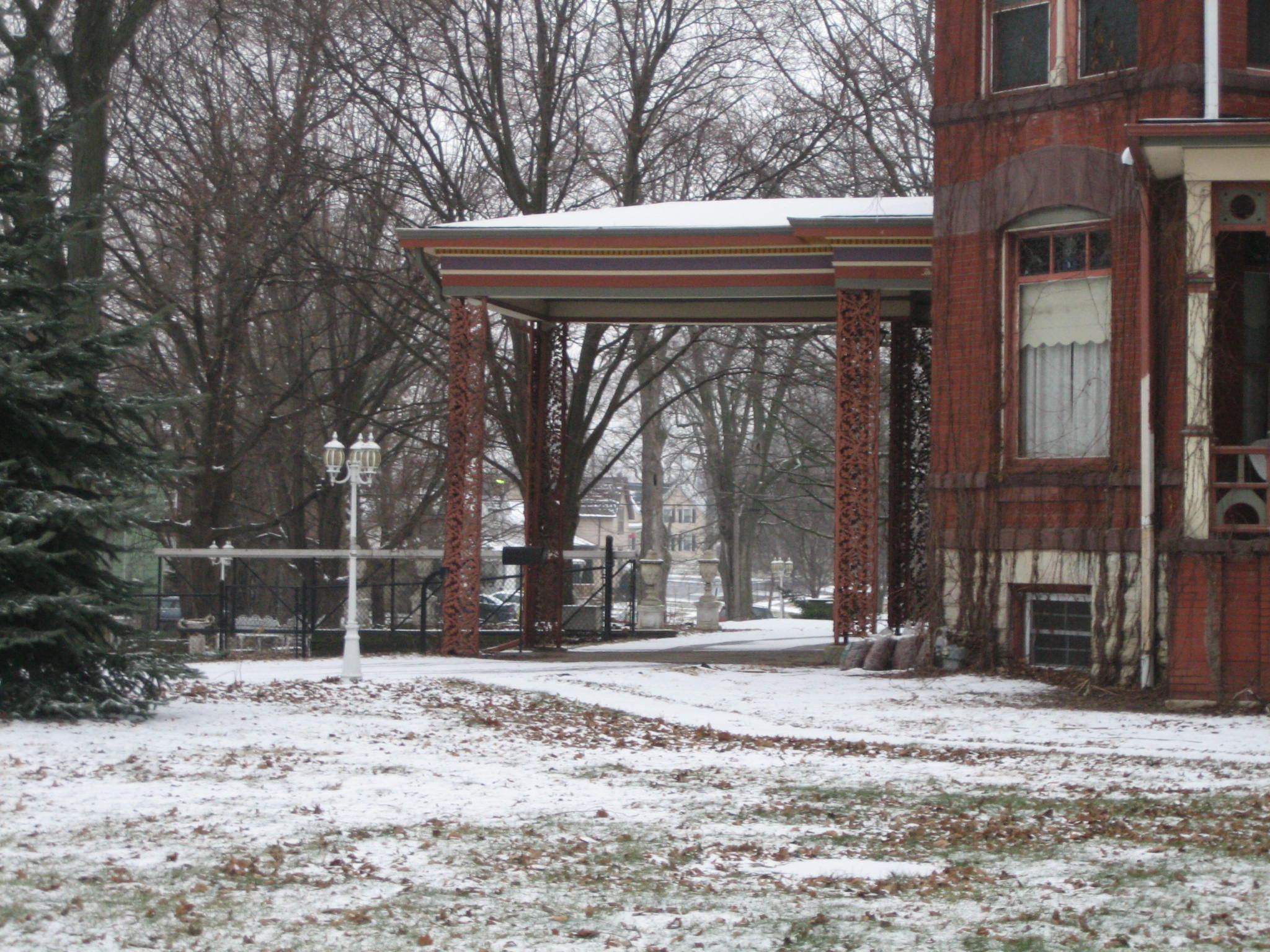
The elegant porte-cochere on the home's south face.

Planning for the Charles Boynton House began in 1886, by Boynton. His hand picked architect was George O. Garnsey of Chicago, who had designed a number of prominent structures in DeKalb and in Sycamore. Many of those structures are listed on the National Register either individually or as part of the Sycamore Historic District. The Queen Anne style mansion was completed by April 1887 at a cost of about $12,000.

The house remained in the Boynton family for around 100 years but went through numerous changes throughout its history. In the 1940s the family converted the first floor of the home for use as a gift, antique and women's clothing shop. To add merchandise space they enclosed the porch with glass and consolidated their living quarters to the upper floor. Finally, in 1986, the home left the hands of the Boynton family as third generation Lillian Boynton put the home up for sale, asking $275,000. The home, nearby Charles O. Boynton Carriage House, and surrounding property sold for $207,000.

The home's new owners set about remodeling, mostly the interior of the home. Outside they returned the porch to its 1880s appearance. The third floor had originally held a grand ballroom, said to have been even larger than that in the Ellwood House. At its height the ballroom was lavishly decorated and furnished. Even in the home's last years with Lillian Boynton the ballroom still retained its deteriorated original wallpaper and gas chandeliers. After the sale, the ballroom was gutted to make way for a new master bedroom.

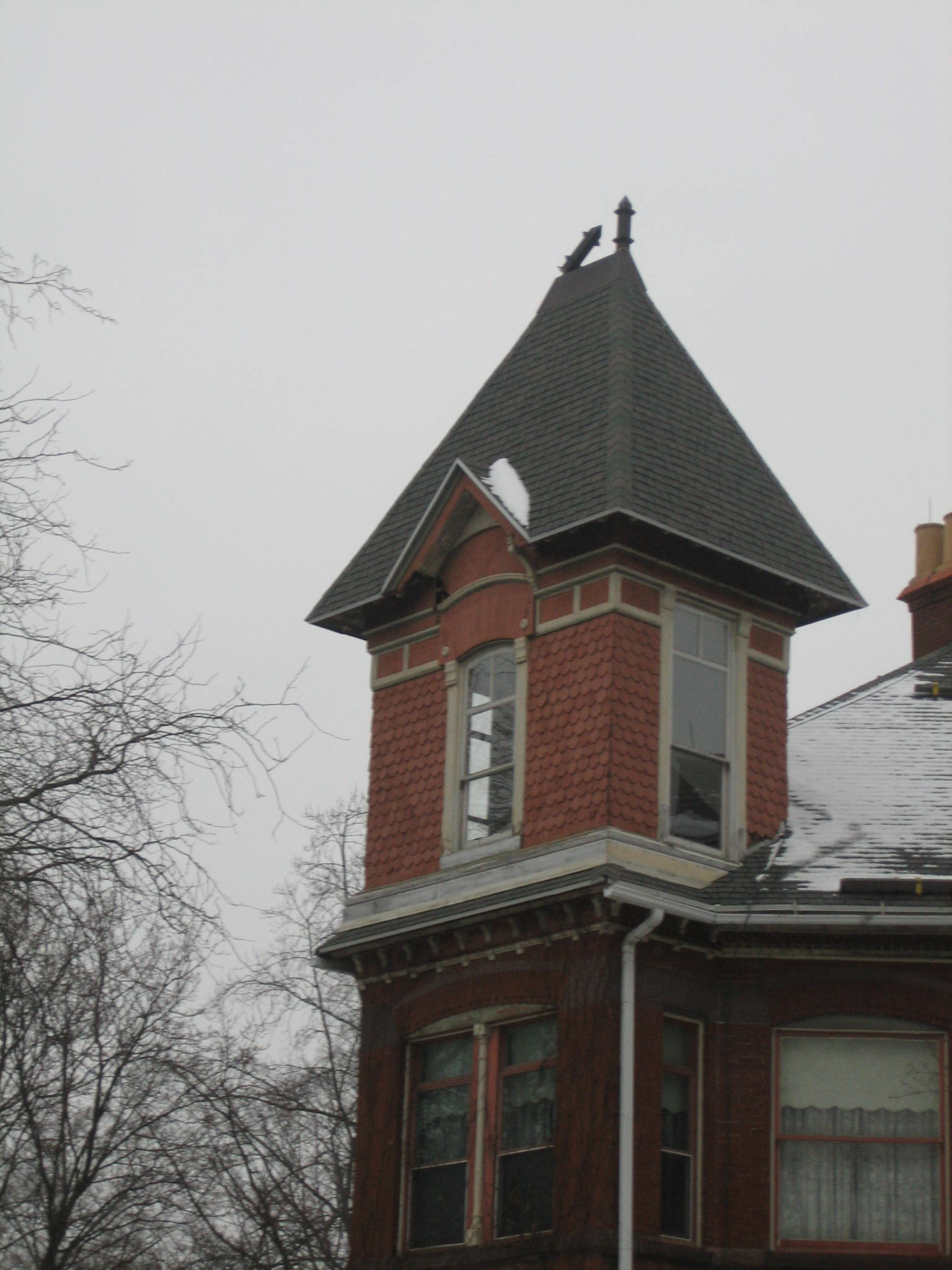
The tower on the mansion's southeast corner.

The home hit the market for the third time in a little over 100 years in 1997. Both the home and carriage house passed hands, separately this time, due to bankruptcy proceedings. The home, at 8,824 square feet (819.8 m^{2}) remained a single family home while the carriage house was converted for office space.

On December 16, 2016, the Boynton House was damaged in a fire that originated in the home's carport. Authorities speculated that a carpenter's van owned by a hardwood flooring company that was working on the property ignited, causing an estimated $175,000 in damages. No one was harmed in the fire.

== Architecture ==
The facade is red brick and light colored stone. There is a diagonally placed turret in the mansion's southeast corner, rising above the rest of the house. Bays are formed in the first and second floor rooms within the tower. A prominent oriel projects from the second floor's northeast corner, opposite the tower. Many windows are detailed in stained glass including those in the oriel. The porte-cochere has been remodeled over the years and was originally intended to awe and amaze visitors to the Boynton House.

The home has seen a number of changes aside from the porte-cochere. The front porch has undergone dramatic altering through the years. When Garnsey designed the building he intended the porch as an open and wooden decorative touch. By the turn of the 20th century the porch had been replaced with a brick based porch. The 1940s brought the commercial conversion of the first floor of the home and the porch was enclosed with glass to provide additional space for the business.
