= Sycamore Public Library =

Carnegie library in Sycamore, Illinois, US

- U.S. Historic district – Contributing property
- Location: Sycamore, DeKalb County, Illinois
- Coordinates: 41°59′19.4″N 88°41′1.8″W
- Built: 1905
- Architect: Paul O. Moratz
- Architectural style: Classical Revival
- Part of: Sycamore Historic District (ID78003104)
- Added to NRHP: May 2, 1978

The Sycamore Public Library, in Sycamore, Illinois, was erected in 1905 in the former location of Mansion House, Sycamore's oldest structure. Construction began in May of that year and the library officially opened to the public on Thanksgiving Day, 1905. The library joined the National Register of Historic Places in May 1978 with the rest of the Sycamore Historic District. The library still operates, as of 2019, as the Sycamore library. The library was erected with the help of a $10,000 grant from Andrew Carnegie in 1905.

== See also ==
- Paxton Carnegie Public Library
