= DeKalb County Courthouse (Illinois) =

Local government building in the United States

- U.S. Historic district – Contributing property
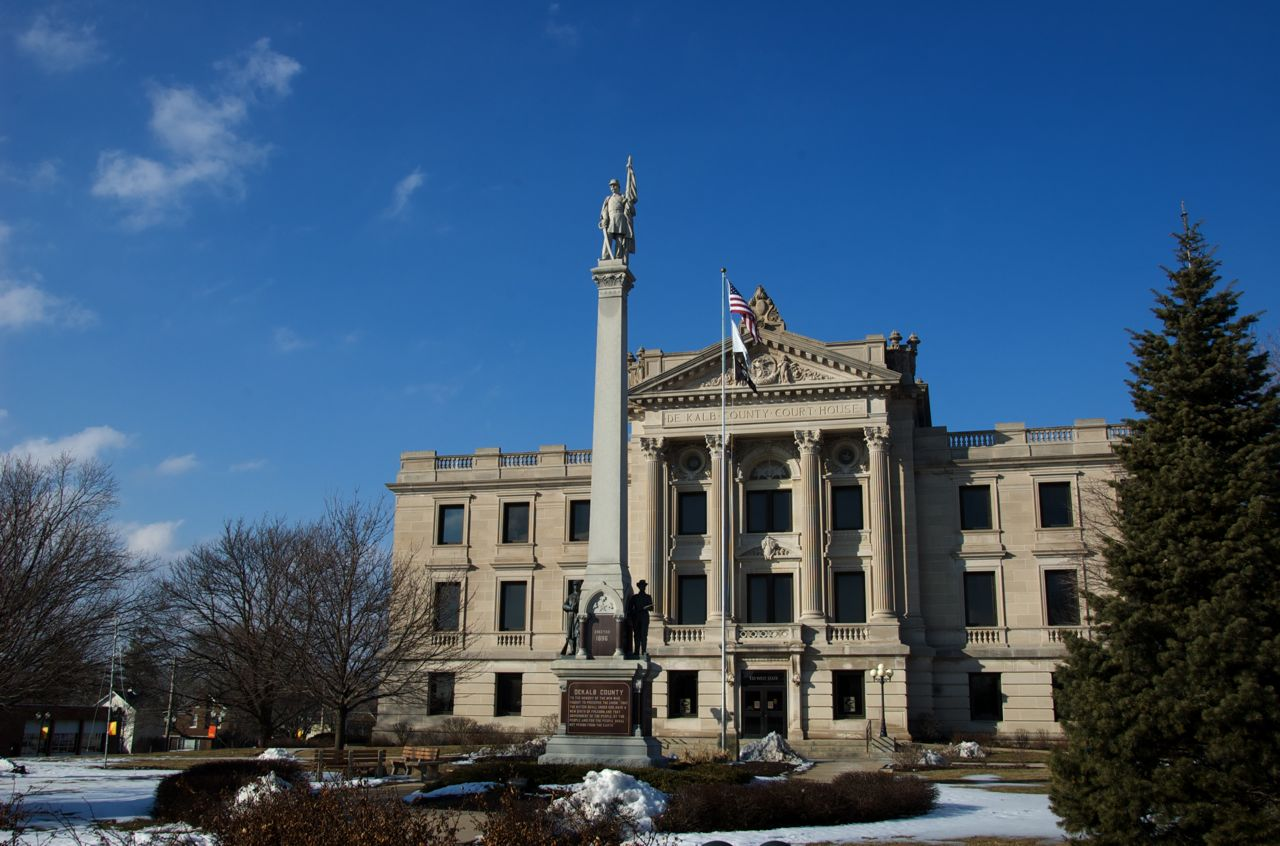
- Southern side

- Location within Illinois
- Interactive map showing the location for DeKalb County Courthouse
- Location: Sycamore, DeKalb County, Illinois, U.S.
- Coordinates: 41°59′20.8284″N 88°41′6.4494″W
- Built: 1905; 121 years ago
- Architect: Herbert T. Hazelton (Watson & Hazelton)
- Architectural style: Nlassical
- Part of: Sycamore Historic District (ID78003104)
- Added to NRHP: May 2, 1978

The DeKalb County Courthouse is located in the county seat of DeKalb County, Illinois, U.S., the city of Sycamore. The Classical Revival structure sits on a square facing Illinois Route 64 as it passes through the city. The current courthouse was constructed in 1905 amid controversy over where the courthouse and thus, ultimately, the county seat would be located. The current building is the third structure to bear the name "DeKalb County Courthouse." DeKalb County's Courthouse still serves as the county's primary judicial center and is a contributing property to the Sycamore Historic District. The district joined the National Register of Historic Places in 1978. As the county's primary courthouse for over 100 years, the site has been host to many trials, including prominent murder cases.

The building is cast in the Classical Revival architectural style and contains elements common to that style. Stained glass, columns and a pediment are among the more noticeable features at a glance. The rear facade of the building is designed to resemble a temple and also features stained glass windows. A stone porte-cochere covers the rear driveway. Inside the building's third floor courtroom is more stained glass, in the form of a skylight. During the early 1980s the made-for-television movie Will: G. Gordon Liddy filmed scenes in the DeKalb County Courthouse's courtroom.

== History ==
Today's DeKalb County Courthouse is the third in a line of structures to carry that name. In 1839 a log structure was built and called the county courthouse; the log building stood across the street from the current courthouse. Ten years later, in 1850, the second DeKalb County Courthouse was erected. From December 13, 1902 until April 17, 1924, DeKalb-Sycamore Electric Traction Company operated a trolley route between the two cities (DeKalb and Sycamore), which ended at the DeKalb County Courthouse. The current courthouse, which sits on the same site as the 1850 building, was erected in 1905.

=== First courthouse ===
The DeKalb County Circuit Court came into existence in June 1839 when the first session of court met in Sycamore's first courthouse building, though the building was somewhat incomplete. At first, it seemed, that Sycamore might not be the location of the DeKalb County Courthouse; other towns were vying for the county seat title. A now defunct town called Brush Point was the choice of a Dr. Henry Madden and Rufus Colton would have preferred Coltonville, where he made his home.

Colton, the Clerk of the Court and preparer of the writs and process of the court, had set the first session of the county court to be held at his home, in Coltonville. In his attempt to make Coltonville the county seat, Colton decided to hold a new election for the status. Colton made sure that Coltonville would win the election by telling only the population of Coltonville about it. His political tactics were eventually cancelled by an act of the Illinois General Assembly, after the DeKalb County court intervened. When the court convened the sheriff served a court order declaring a courthouse be built in Sycamore. Afterward, Coltonville eventually suffered the same fate as Brush Point and disappeared from the map. These events seemingly settled the issue of where the courthouse and, in turn, the DeKalb County seat was going to be located.

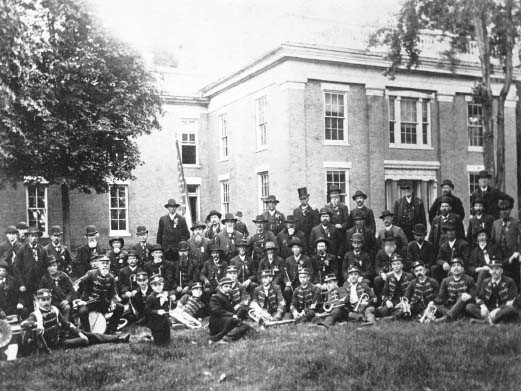
The 1850 DeKalb County Courthouse, depicted with the Grand Army of the Republic.

=== Second courthouse ===
By 1849 growth in DeKalb County necessitated a new courthouse. That year the county commissioners appointed three citizens, Ellzey P. Young, Kimball Dow, and J.C. Kellogg, to contract for a new courthouse building. The courthouse building was to be constructed at the center of the public square; the location of the 1850 DeKalb County Courthouse. The county commissioners also stipulated the building be brick and 60 by 40 feet (12 m) wide. The cost, as directed by the commissioners, was not to exceed $6,000. Twenty five percent of that cost was contributed by private citizens. Young and the other appointees were also authorized, by the county, to sell the old courthouse as well as any town lots owned by the county in order to help raise money for the project. Eventually, William Phelps was contracted for the construction of the two-story brick structure which was topped with a large cupola clock tower. It was completed in 1850 and the county inaugurated the courthouse with Grand Ball in 1851.

=== Third courthouse ===
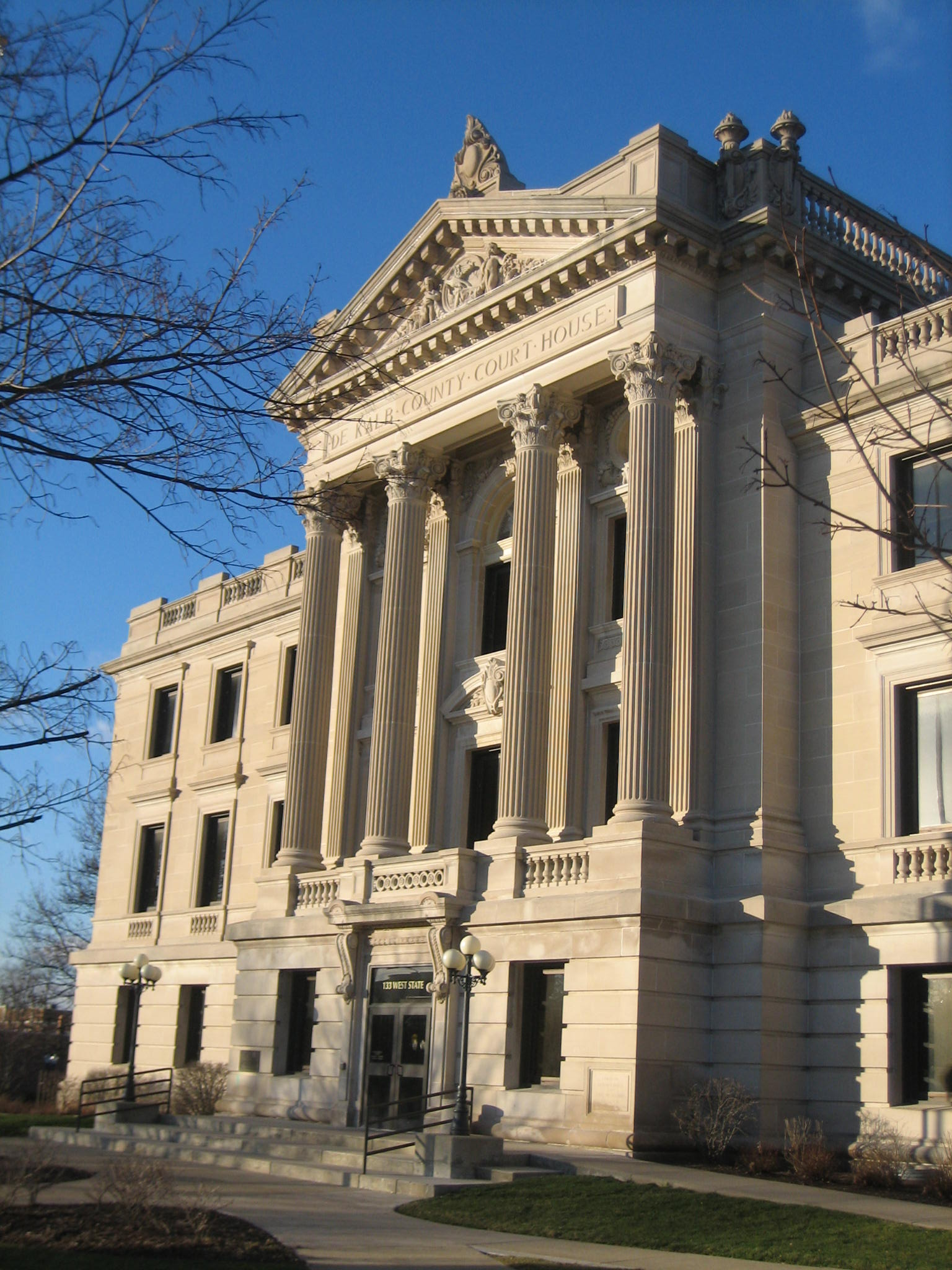
The third and current courthouse is possibly the jewel of the Sycamore Historic District.

The third and current DeKalb County Courthouse was constructed in 1905 at an approximate cost of $137,000. The project reignited the debate over the county courthouse's location and, once again, the debate over which town would hold the coveted title of county seat. The county Board of Supervisors authorized the project in 1901 and appropriated $100,000 for the new building. The idea for a new courthouse originated as early as 1900, when the essential design elements of the Lee County courthouse were chosen as the model for the new DeKalb County Courthouse. Though the courthouse was modelled after the Lee County structure it does differ; the Lee County building, in Dixon, Illinois, has a rooftop dome and also is longer and wider than the DeKalb County building. By 1903, the appropriation had been upped to $140,000 and the battle over the county seat had begun.

This time, it was the city of DeKalb that sought to wrest the title of county seat away from Sycamore. Two of DeKalb's most prominent citizens, Jacob Haish and Isaac L. Ellwood, each promised to donate $20,000 to help absorb some of the new building's cost; their donation hinged upon the courthouse being moved to and constructed in DeKalb. The city of Sycamore responded by raising $70,000 in donations from its citizens and legal wrangling continued, until 1904. Haish eventually pledged $103,000 for a DeKalb courthouse but it was decided that the county seat would stay in Sycamore and ground was broken, despite the continuing legal battle, on October 29, 1903. The building was completed on March 1, 1905 and the Crew Brothers Company was hired to demolish the 1850 DeKalb County Courthouse.

In recent history the third DeKalb County Courthouse has figured in films, as well as the Global War on Terrorism. Courtroom scenes for the 1982 made for television movie Will: G. Gordon Liddy, the story of G. Gordon Liddy (of Watergate infamy), were filmed in the courthouse's third floor courtroom. In 2006 the United States Department of Justice announced it had arrested Derrick Shareef on terrorism related charges. Among the crimes the government accused Shareef of plotting was a plan to assault the DeKalb County Courthouse in order to "smoke a judge."

=== Circuit court history ===
The DeKalb County Courthouse serves DeKalb County, Illinois as its main judiciary building. As such, it is the location of any trials and court proceedings in the county. The DeKalb County Circuit Court falls under the Illinois 16th Judicial Circuit, along with the circuit courts in Kendall and Kane Counties. Through its 100-year history prominent criminal trials and other events have occurred at the courthouse.

One of the earliest notable cases in the DeKalb County Circuit Court was the murder trial of Henry C. Atwood in 1866, in the second DeKalb Courthouse building. Atwood, 17 years old at the time, was charged with murdering his wife, Ada, then 15. The Chicago Tribune called the events "a thrilling tragedy enacted in the little town of DeKalb, in the county of DeKalb." Prominent DeKalb resident Jacob Haish testified for the prosecution during Atwood's trial.

During the summer of 1966 the trial of Russell Charles Dewey was underway at the courthouse. Dewey was accused of murdering and burning the body of Susan Brady, who disappeared on December 20, 1965; he was arrested in for the crime in February 1966. Dewey was convicted of the crime on August 21, 1966.

On March 22, 1971 a group of Northern Illinois University students were arrested while protesting the clear cutting of a forested area on the DeKalb, Illinois campus. About 150 students blockaded the roads leading to the forested site with debris; twelve were arrested and the subsequent proceedings at the DeKalb County Courthouse were covered by the Chicago Tribune. All charges were eventually dismissed in the case.

During the summer of 1990 an exiting judge, Rex Meilinger, presented an unusual request to the DeKalb County Board. Meilinger announced, partway through his term, that he planned to retire and requested that his retirement dinner be held "at the courthouse" when asked. Meilinger assured the board that the move was legal and preparations began for a catered dinner for more than 200 guests at the DeKalb County Courthouse. Tables were set up in the lobbies on each floor of the building and the circuit clerk's first floor office was transformed into a bar. The third-floor courtroom hosted an after-dinner roast in honour of the exiting judge.

== Architecture ==
=== Exterior ===
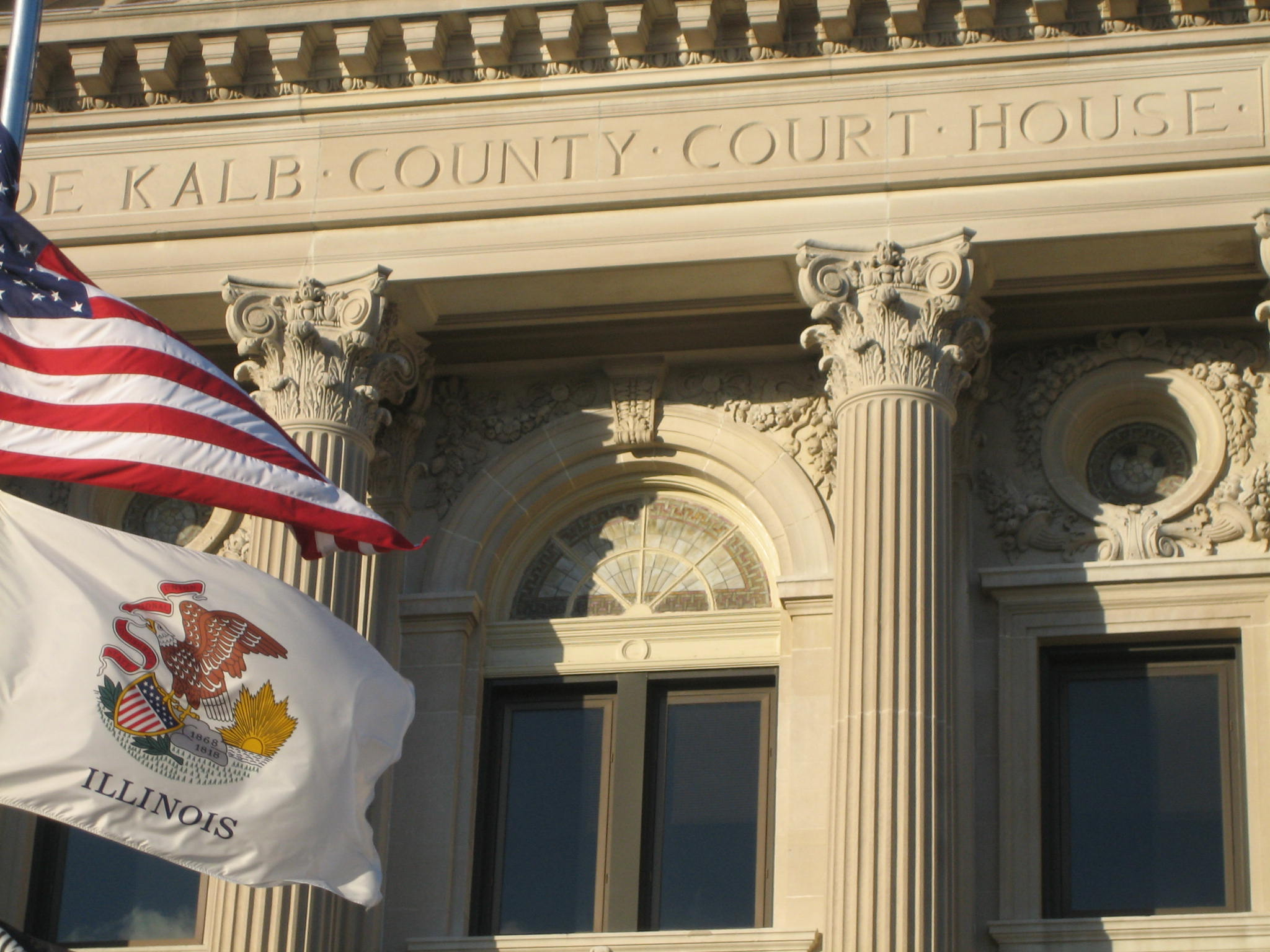
The columns that decorate its front facade of the courthouse combine Ionic and Corinthian themes.

The building faces south, toward Illinois Route 64 and was designed by architect Herbert T. Hazelton, of the Chicago firm Watson & Hazelton. The 128-foot (39 m) by 100-foot (30 m) building stands three stories; its exterior covered in Bedford, Indiana limestone. The courthouse's setting, on the public square in downtown Sycamore, renders it an impressive structure from most approach angles. Heavily carved stone brackets support a lintel over the main doors on the building's front facades. The four columns dominating the front extends two stories and blend Ionic and Corinthian elements as they ascend from the second floor to the cornice level of the courthouse. Stone balustrades accent the small balcony on the second floor and the windows on the same floor, in the east and west wings, have a row of six balustrades below their sills, which form a continuous stringcourse around the building.

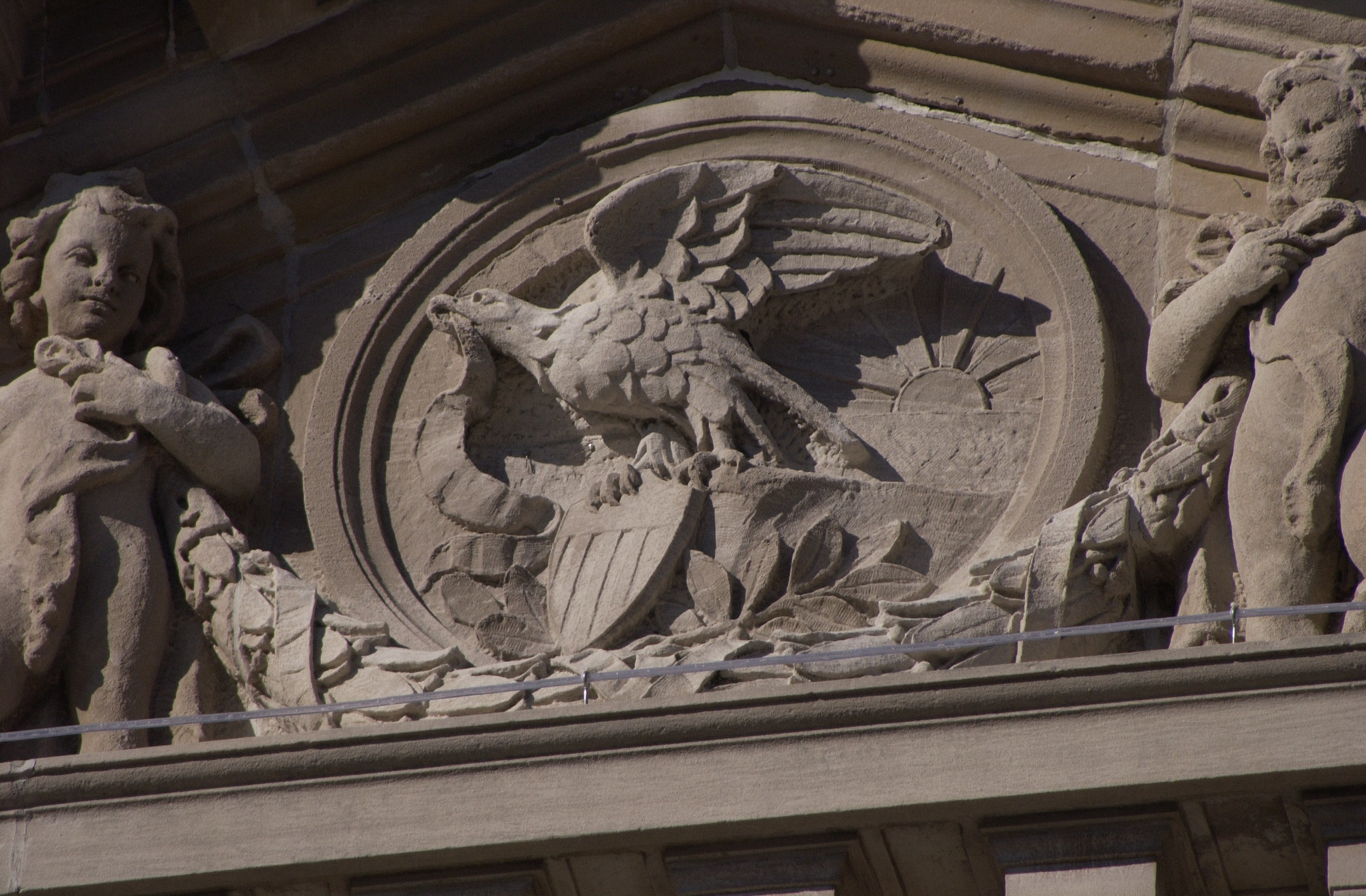
The relief Seal of Illinois dominates the courthouse pediment.

Classical sculpture covers the pediment above the front colonnade, with the seal of the State of Illinois dominating the relief. Stained glass windows can be found topping the third floor windows. The cornice on the roof consists of three rows of eight balustrades and stone blocks. A common decorative ornament in Greek Revival and Classical Revival architecture can be found in an anthemion at the peak of the pediment. The courthouse roof is enclosed in stonework and balustrades.

The north side of the DeKalb County Courthouse is not as ornately decorated as the south face but each has its own distinctive qualities. The courthouse drive, entering from Exchange Street, crosses below a stone porte-cochere on the courthouse property. The backside of the building features four pilasters with composite capitals which give the courthouse a temple appearance.

=== Interior ===
From November 1984 to June 1987 the DeKalb County Courthouse underwent an interior restoration, which was completed in time for the sesquicentennial celebration for DeKalb County. The restoration, at an approximate cost of $100,000, was undertaken by Conrad Schmitt Studios of New Berlin, Wisconsin. The modern front doors to the courthouse hide the original, beveled glass front doors from view. Once inside the modern doors, the nonfunctional original doors can be seen, standing wide open, to be admired; each door weighs several hundred pounds. Past the doors, in the building's main lobby, is the large, marble staircase to the second floor. The staircase, as well as the lobby's wainscoting, is done in gray Tennessee marble. Most of the first floor is original to the building, including the hexagonal marble flooring, stained glass windows and two original, first floor courtrooms. The plasterwork along the walls and ceilings of the lobby is ornately decorated.

Ascending the staircase are bronze railings with mahogany banisters. The railings are decorated with swastikas, they were constructed prior to the use of the symbol by the Nazis. The stairway's newel posts, on the landing between the second and third floors, are a pair of bronze ram's heads, identical newel posts grace the bottom of the stairs as well. The second floor landing offers a view of the stained glass windows, all original, which were fully restored during the 1980s renovation. Elevator access is also located on the second floor landing, the elevator was a 1950s addition to the courthouse. Originally, to access the third floor, the only option was one of two staircases. Both staircases rose from the second floor landing to the third floor, one staircase was located to either side of the stairwell leading to the landing. When the elevator was installed the staircase on the left-hand side of the landing was removed.

Inside the ornate building's third-floor courtroom is a stained glass skylight centered by a ten-pointed star. The room is adorned with six brass lamps, and chandeliers, which are clustered with glass globes. In its original state an old-fashioned, four-bladed ceiling fan hung from the courtroom ceiling. The third-floor courtroom has been called, "the building's single most distinctive interior space" by Steve Bigolin. The furnishings in the courtroom, including the chandeliers, plasterwork, bevelled glass doors and stained glass work are all original.

== Significance ==
The courthouse was included in the National Register of Historic Places nomination for the Sycamore Historic District in 1978. Of the 209 structures contained within the district when it was originally nominated the courthouse is one of 40 possessing "special architectural and/or historical significance", which strongly contributes to the character of the historic district. The courthouse was one of twenty structures detailed on the 1978 nomination form and was noted as having "architectural significance."

== See also ==
- Civil War Memorial
