= Sycamore Historic District =

Historic district in Sycamore, Illinois, USA

- U.S. National Register of Historic Places
- U.S. Historic district
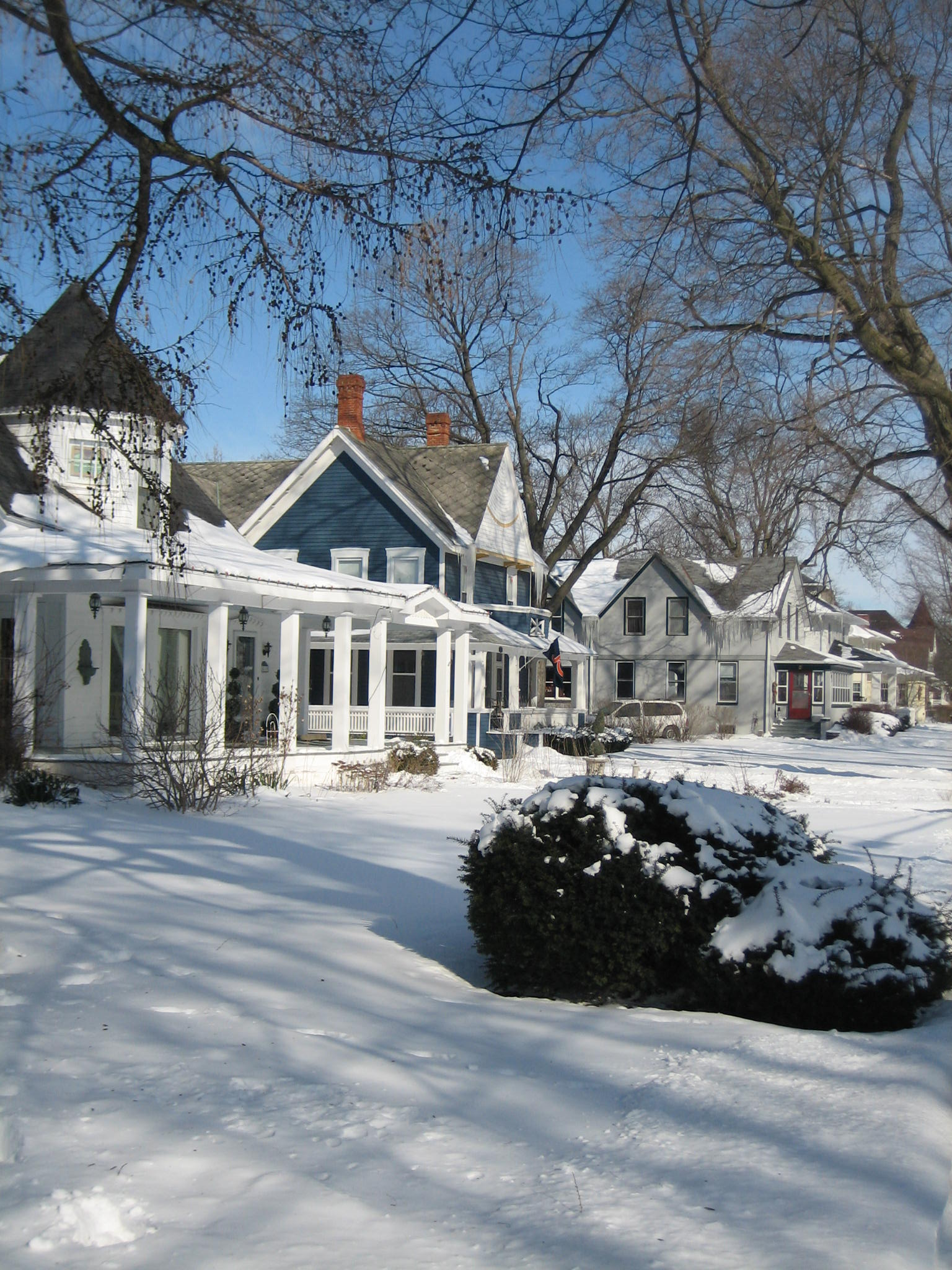
- Streetside in the district

- Location within Illinois Location within the United States
- Location: Irregular pattern along Main and Somonauk Sts., Sycamore, Illinois
- Coordinates: 41°59′6″N 88°41′12″W
- Area: 99 acres (40 ha)
- Architect: Multiple
- Architectural style: Classical Revival; Greek Revival; Gothic Revival; Italianate; Medieval Revival; Queen Anne
- NRHP reference No.: 78003104
- Added to NRHP: May 2, 1978

The Sycamore Historic District is a meandering area encompassing 99 acres (400,000 m^{2}) of the land in and around the downtown of the DeKalb County, Illinois county seat, Sycamore. The area includes historic buildings and a number of historical and Victorian homes. Some significant structures are among those located within the Historic District including the DeKalb County Courthouse and the Sycamore Public Library. The district has been listed on the National Register of Historic Places since May 2, 1978.

There are over 200 properties within the irregular boundaries of the Sycamore Historic District. Of those, 187 are considered contributing properties to the historic district, and 22 are non-contributing. Of all of the district's homes and buildings 75% fit within the historic district concept. Some of the major structures include several prominent Queen Anne style mansions, the Sycamore library, the DeKalb County Courthouse, and dozens of mid- to late 19th-century houses.

== History ==
The 1966 National Historic Preservation Act, which created the National Register of Historic Places, empowered individual states to create review boards to function with the state historical preservation officer. Illinois did not create its historic preservation program until the early 1970s, under the direction of the Illinois Department of Conservation. The Department of Conservation dispatched field surveyors to all Illinois counties to find anything that might qualify for inclusion on the National Register of Historic Places.

The field surveyor who traveled to Sycamore in 1973 found a large number of late 19th and 20th century examples of architecture that he recommended the establishment of a historic district. The mayor of Sycamore then appointed a citizens' committee to assist the state with the work involved in listing the district.

The residential areas within the district achieved their maturity before 1900, though Sycamore has grown considerably from the 3,330 or so that lived there from about 1900 until the 1970s most of the historic district remains intact as it was organized in 1978.

== Boundaries ==
The Historic District is bounded by Somonauk Street on the west and Main Street on the east, a stretch of two blocks. On the north end the district is bounded by Page Street and extends to the end of South Main street. Main and Somonauk are both north/south roads while Page is an east/west street. The district also extends along State Street (Illinois Route 64) to the west until the 300 block. Somonauk Street is included through its 900 block. In addition section of Locust, Maple and California Streets are within the Sycamore Historic District. Other east/west streets also have portions included in the district, these are: Elm, High, Ottawa, Waterman and Lincoln.

The boundaries were drawn up by Robert Wagner, a Chicagoan who worked as a National Register assistant with the Illinois Department of Conservation. Wagner drew up the boundaries on the basis of "visual integrity".. This led to an irregular pattern of inclusion for the Sycamore Historic District. Often one side of the street will be in the district while the other side will not. In other cases, such as with the library or the U.S. Post Office an arbitrary line was drawn with the sole purpose of including a specific structure.

== Architecture ==
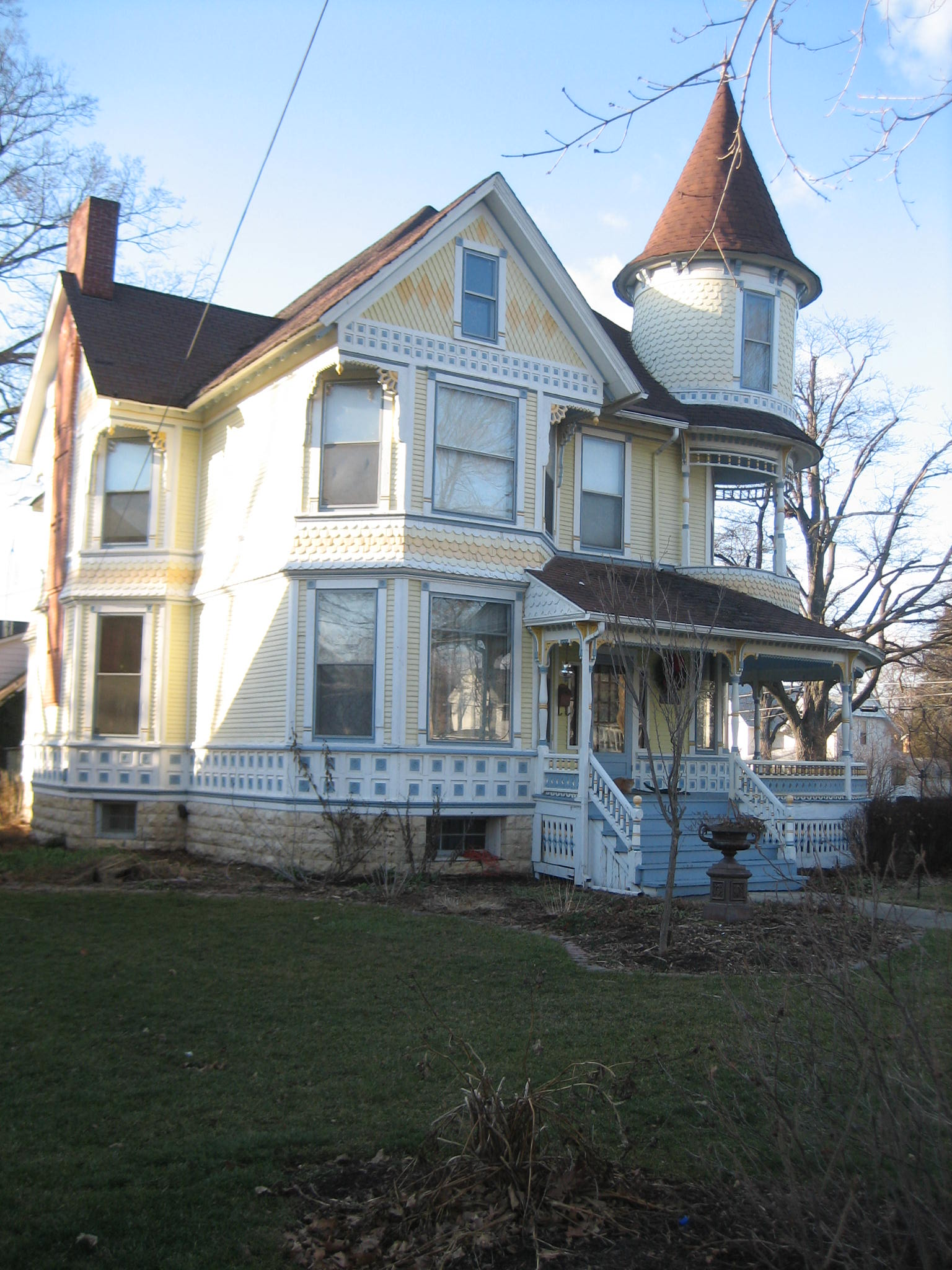
The 1890 Garbutt House, an example of Queen Anne style.

The hodge podge of architectural styles that mingle in the Sycamore Historic District begins with Greek Revival structures which date from Sycamore's foundation in the mid to late 1830s, also the heyday for that particular style. These structures are the oldest surviving within the district. After the Civil War other styles began to dot the landscape in and around downtown Sycamore, Illinois. Styles such as Italianate, Gothic Revival and Queen Anne can be found throughout the neighborhood. Government buildings and commercial buildings offer prime examples of Classical Revival architecture, a style showcased by the ornate DeKalb County Courthouse, Sycamore Public Library, U.S. Post Office and The National Bank & Trust Co. building. The current Sycamore Center, in the 300 block of State Street and once known as the Daniel Pierce Block, also exhibits. Classical Revival architecture.

Of the 226 properties within the Sycamore Historic District 40 are identified as "strongly contributing" to the overall character of the district. Twenty-one of those are ranked as the most significant structures in the district. The majority of the rest of the buildings date from 1860-1900.

== Properties ==
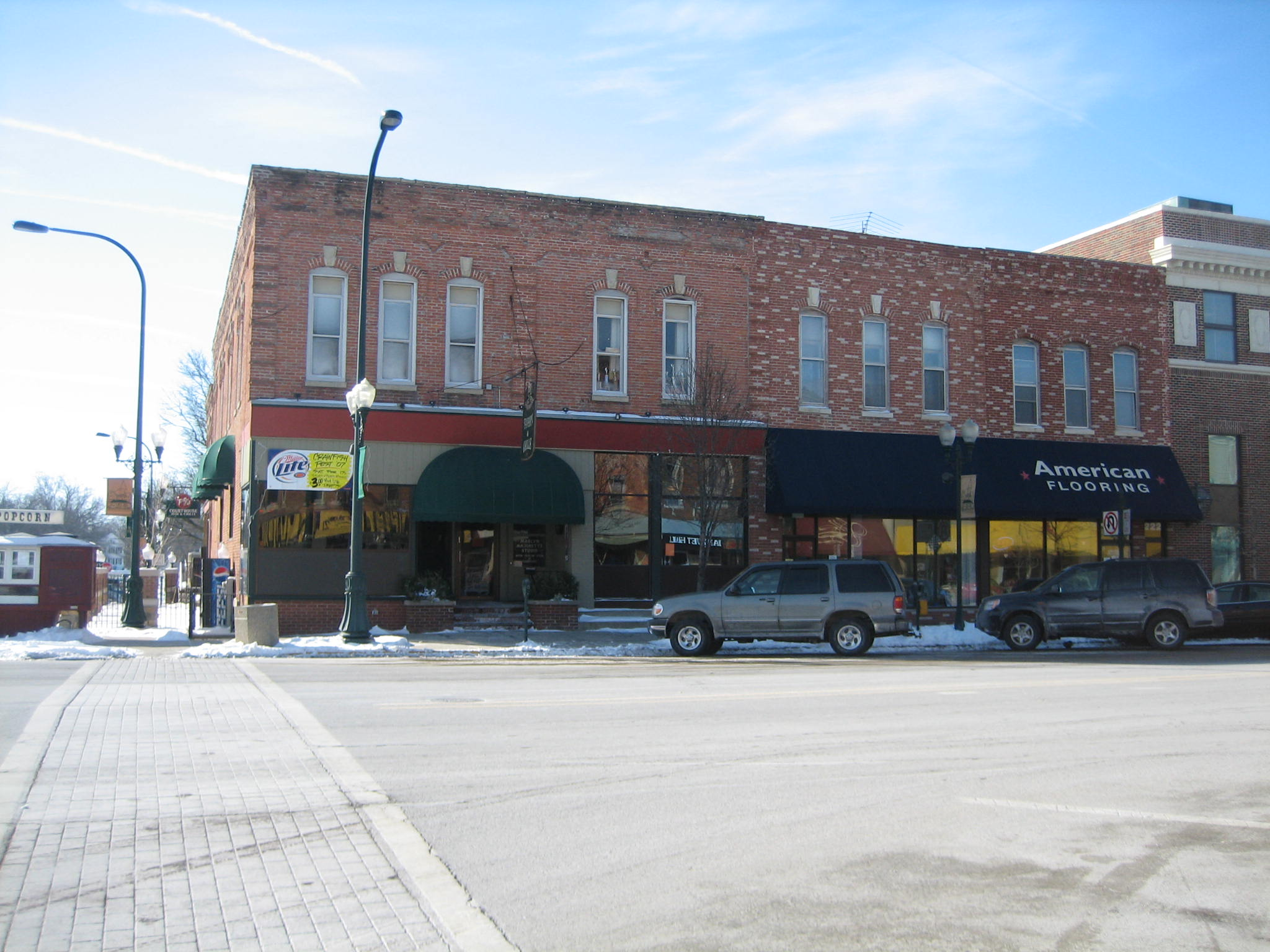
The Waterman Block.

Sycamore Historic District includes a combination of residential, commercial, government and religious buildings. A number of Victorian homes along Main Street are enclosed in the historic district as well as a number of buildings in downtown Sycamore. South of the courthouse are other homes included in the district, each important structure is marked with a plaque near the sidewalk.

226 properties are located within the Sycamore Historic District's 99 acres (400,000 m^{2}). Of those properties, 187 are listed as contributing structures in the district while an additional 22 are non-contributing. Of all the homes and other buildings within the district a full 75% fit within the historic district concept.

=== Churches ===
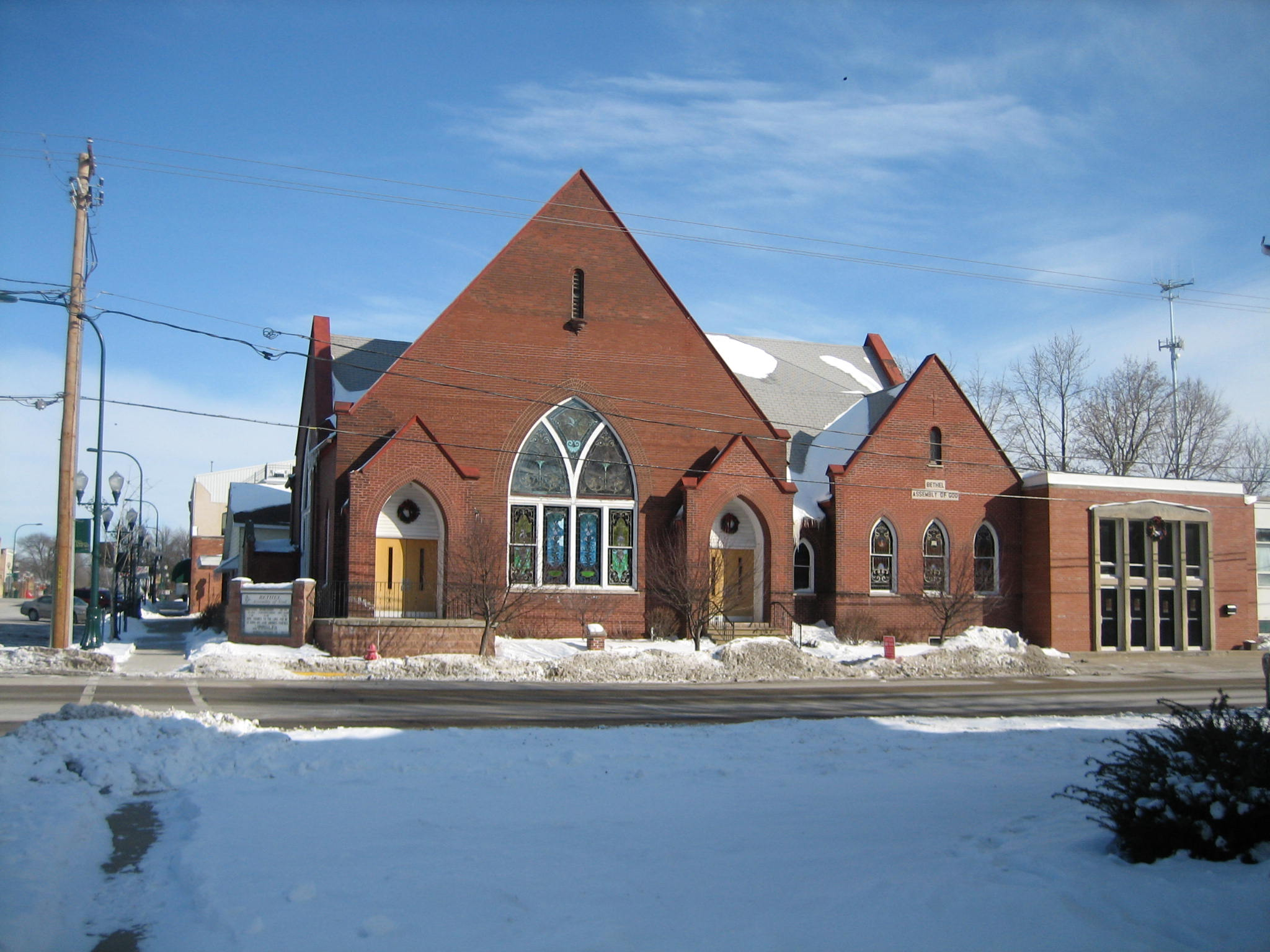
There are five extant churches in the district including the Bethel Assemblies of God Church.

As of 2007 there are five church buildings in the Sycamore Historic District. When it was nominated to join the National Register there were seven church buildings within the district. One of those included is a residential structure that was utilized as a church when it was first constructed; the Arthur Stark House was once home to the Sycamore Universalist Church congregation. In the time since its listing, two churches have been destroyed or demolished. The Evangelical Church of St. John was destroyed by fire in 2004 and the United Methodist Church in Sycamore is no longer extant, replaced by a modern office building. The extant churches are the Old Congregational Church, Bethel Assembly of God Church, St. Peter's Church, the Universalist Church/Stark House and St. Mary's Roman Catholic Church.

=== Commercial buildings ===
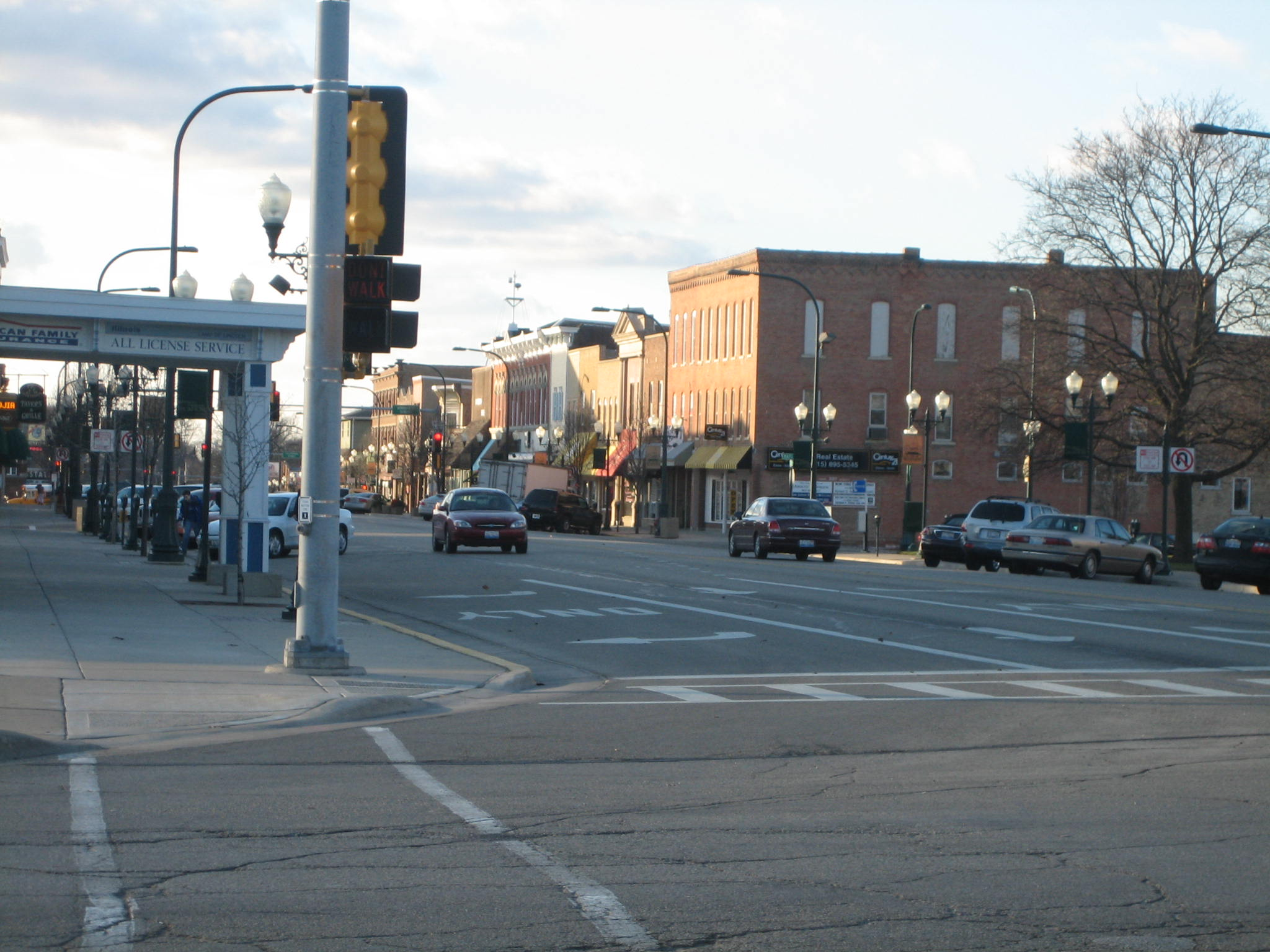
A view of downtown Sycamore, toward the George's Block and the Citizens National Bank Building.

The commercial buildings in the Sycamore Historic District, located in Sycamore, Illinois, United States are mostly located in and around the city's downtown. The largest concentration of commercial contributing properties to the historic district are found along Illinois Route 64 as it passes through Sycamore. They include several buildings known as "blocks" which can consist of more than one adjacent and attached structure, as is the case with the Waterman Block, one of the Sycamore commercial buildings.

=== DeKalb County Courthouse ===
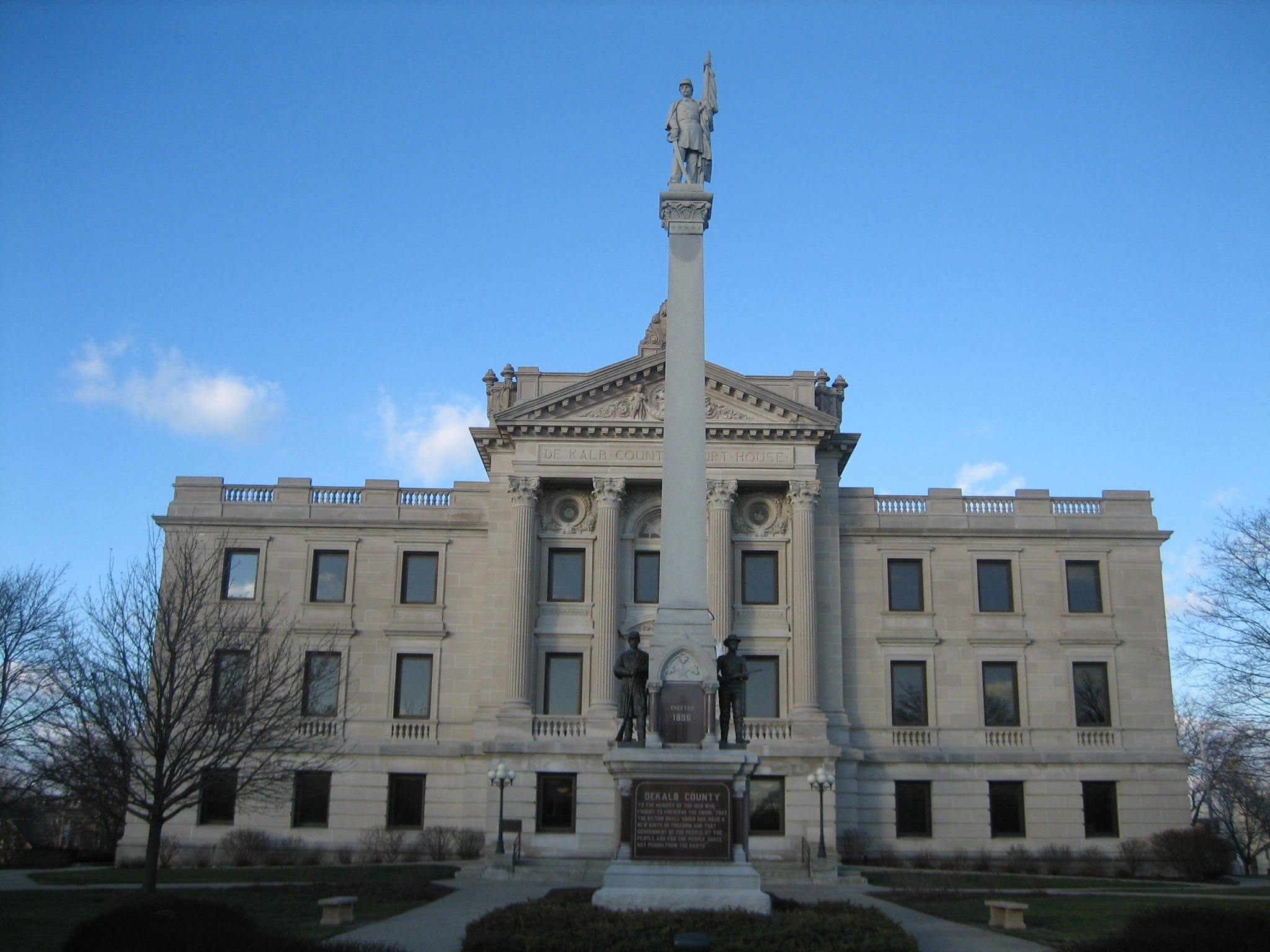
The DeKalb County Courthouse

Possibly the gem of the Sycamore Historic District is the DeKalb County Courthouse. The Courthouse sits in the center of a square facing Illinois Route 64, directly across the north/south street, Main, from the Sycamore Public Library. It is a stunning example of Classical Revival architecture. The current structure was erected in 1905 being the third in a line of courthouses to serve DeKalb County.

=== Frederick Townsend Garage ===
This building on Main Street was originally a garage owned by Sycamore resident Frederick B. Townsend. Townsend's Queen Anne style home overlooks the lot from a small incline. The distinctive stone structure was constructed in 1906 for use as a garage for the estate of Frederick B. Townsend, his former home is the Queen Anne mansion that overlooks the garage property. Today it is home to a restaurant. After the building left private ownership the property was exploited for commercial use and became a gas station. Despite the years and the changes in function the building's historical character remains intact.

=== George's Block ===
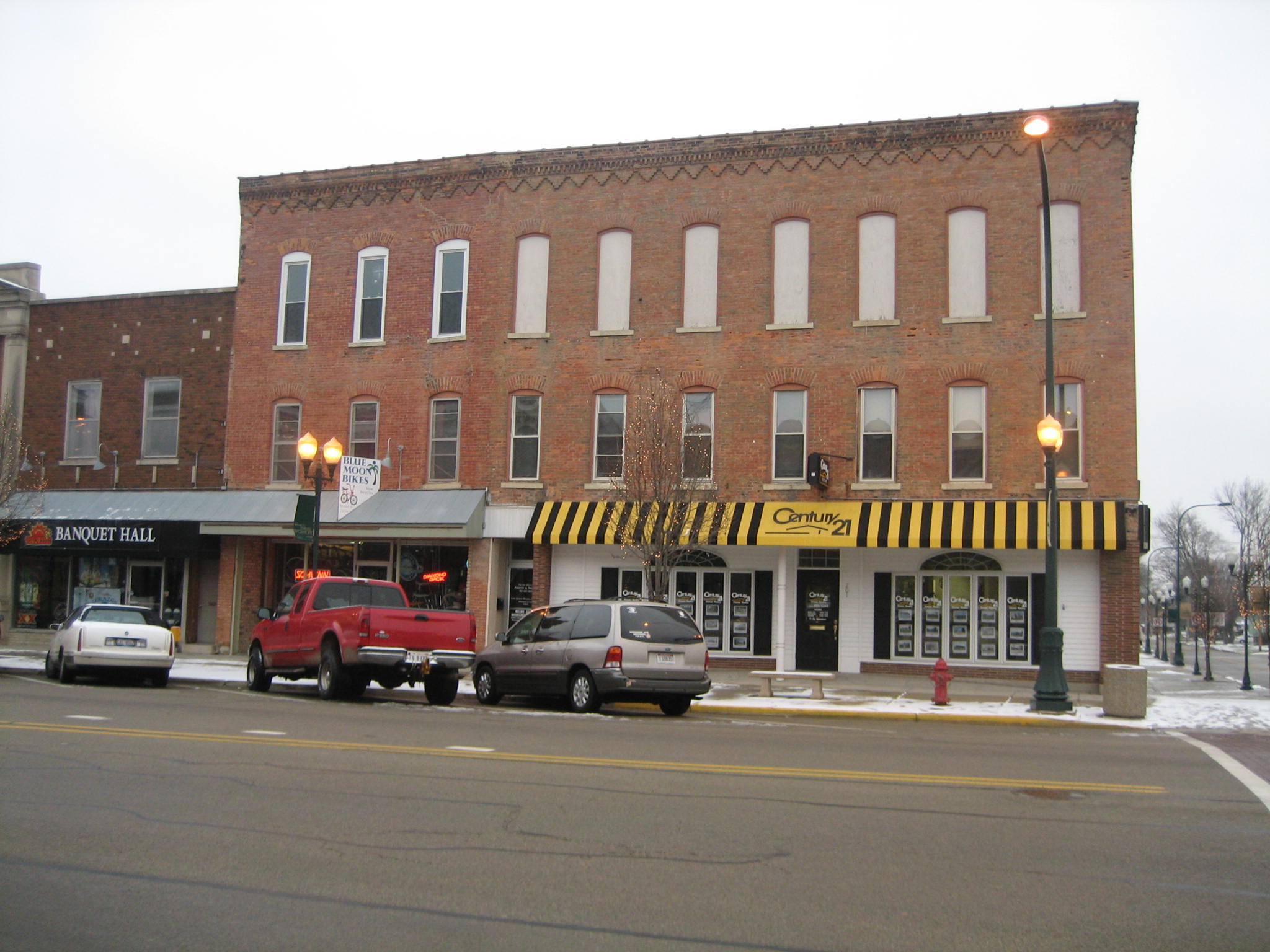
The George's Block.

Though quite altered from its original state in the mid 19th century George's Block remains one of the more eye catching structures in the Historic District. The George's Block was constructed in 1857 and was then known as the James Block, after the owner Daniel P. James. James, a prominent citizen, lived in the nearby Jerkin-roofed D. B. James House, another contributing property. By the 1860s the James name was gone but the building was still known as a block. Many buildings of the period were known as blocks, usually multi-story and multi-business, the buildings contained retail and professional space or, in the case of George's Block, lecture halls or auditoriums. In the first year the building existed such famous men as Horace Greeley, Charles Sumner and Bayard Taylor spoke there.

=== Houses ===
The houses in the Sycamore Historic District cross a variety of architectural styles and span from the 1830s to the early 20th century. There are 187 contributing properties within the historic district, 75% of the districts buildings. Many of the homes are associated with early Sycamore residents, usually prominent business leaders or politicians. Houses within the district are known by, either their street address or by a name associated with a prominent owner or builder. For most of the houses, the latter is true. Some of the more prominent homes include the Charles O. Boynton House, the Frederick B. Townsend House, David Syme House and the Carlos Lattin House. The oldest single family residence in Sycamore is the Young/Robinson estate located at the southeast corner of Main and Lincoln.

=== U.S. Post Office ===
The U.S. Post Office Building in Sycamore is located along Illinois 64 (State Street), directly across the street from the Sycamore Public Library.

=== Sycamore Public Library ===
Sycamore Public Library, the only structure on the east side of Main Street, between State and Page Streets, that is included in the Sycamore Historic District. The library, still operational today, was constructed in 1905 with a combination of philanthropical gifts from different sources including Andrew Carnegie. The building was designed, in part, by architect Paul O. Moratz.

== Significance ==
The district includes 226 properties over its 99 acres (400,000 m^{2}), of those, 187 are considered contributing members of the historic district. The buildings consist of a mix of residential, religious, commercial and governmental buildings. Many of the residential buildings are 2 or 2½ stories in height and feature generous setbacks from the street. These factors, along with the growth of mature shade trees, combine to give the streetscape a well-balanced and integrated look and feel. While the usage of the properties in Sycamore Historic District is similar to that in other small, Illinois county seats the district's properties are separated by their survival through the 20th century. The buildings themselves are most significant for their architecture which contributes to what the National Register of Historic Places nomination form in 1978 said conveyed "a gracious calm very close to the popular American image of an ideal small town."
