= Haish Memorial Library =

- U.S. National Register of Historic Places
- Location within Illinois Location within the United States
- Location: 309 Oak St., De Kalb, Illinois
- Coordinates: 41°55′53″N 88°45′1″W
- Area: less than one acre
- Built: 1930
- Architect: White & Weber
- Architectural style: Art deco, Art Moderne
- NRHP reference No.: 80004319
- Added to NRHP: October 9, 1980

The Haish Memorial Library (also known as the DeKalb Public Library) was designed by Chicago architects White and Weber (Charles E. White, Jr. and Bertram A. Weber) and built in the art deco style of the 1930s with funds left to the library by Jacob Haish in his 1928 will. The building was added to the National Register of Historic Places in 1980.

== History ==
The building, located in DeKalb, Illinois, was dedicated in 1931 after construction during 1930. Constructed using funds willed by Jacob Haish, $150,000 to be precise, the building marked the first time the DeKalb Library had its own building. Previously it was in the second floor of city hall, then at 125 S. 2nd St., in DeKalb. From 1923 until the Haish Library's dedication the library was housed on the second floor of the Daily Chronicle building on Lincoln Highway.

Its facade is constructed from Indiana Bedford limestone and reflects the art deco style prominent during the 1920s and 1930s. Designed by Chicago-based White & Weber, the library was originally capable of housing 80,000 volumes. The building also had an exhibition hall that could be accessed by a separate entrance. The main entrance features a formal garden. In 1979 a major addition to the library opened, the West Wing. With its addition to the National Historic Register in 1980 the Haish Memorial Library joined other DeKalb landmarks with that designation such as the Egyptian Theatre, the Gurler House, the Ellwood House and the Glidden House. September 10, 2016, the library reopened with phase two of a new expansion completed, which added 46,000 sq. ft to the existing 19,000 sq. ft floorplan, which included an upper level with a new children's section and play room, a computer area, and additional room for children's and adolescent's books, as well as a private room for the library's children-focused events, and four study rooms. Downstairs introduced a new teen's room, with teen's books, board games, televisions, and several video game consoles. 3D printers and digital scanners for photographs and documents were some of the new items included in reopening, available for free use in the computer lab. There is a local history room, which includes documents, regional books, and resources. The building is now wheelchair accessible, with automatic doors, elevators, and a gentle ramp to the door. It now features self-checkout machines.

== Resources ==
The Haish Memorial Library has access to over one million items, including but not limited to books, CDs, DVDs, streaming services, magazines and more. The building provides free Internet access and study rooms to visitors.

=== Events ===
The library hosts around 130 free programs every month, ranging from digital literacy classes, to story times for a variety of ages, to after-hours concerts. Some events are hosted monthly, including the Sustainability Swap, which allows for community members to exchange lightly used clothing and houseplants.

Trivia events, the Anime & Manga Club, Tax-Aide programs, hobby events like vinyl cutting, yarn crafts, papercraft events, loom weaving, 3D modeling, Chess Club, Pokémon Club, gaming tournaments and history classes are just some examples of the events available for a variety of ages.

The library currently has nine separate book clubs for various age groups, ranging from children to adults.

=== Services ===
==== Technology ====
The Haish Memorial Library also has services not easily found elsewhere, including but not limited to, disc cleaning (DVDs & CDs), maker classes and access to vinyl and laser cutters, 3D printers.

The Sound Studio is a free-to-access, sound-resistant room for recording, which includes access to: a PC with Audacity and Reaper installed, Adobe Photoshop, Adobe Premiere Pro, Adobe Audition, Adobe Media Encoder, Blue Yeti USB Microphone, Yamaha Keyboard (with pedal), and a Webcam.

The Computer Lab has twenty-six, high-speed internet access computers available to the public. Cardholders can use the computers for up to three hours a day, while guest passes can be issued to non-cardholders for 15 minutes a day. The lab has four computers with Microsoft Word, Excel, and PowerPoint available for use by any patron, cardholder or guest alike. The library has staff available for technology assistance during all library hours.

The library also has a printer, copier, and fax machine, document scanner, and photograph digitizer available for use.

==== Assistance ====
The library has free one-on-one English-language tutoring, exam proctoring for online students, notary public services, tax information, and voter registration.

Accessibility services include the Talking Book and Braille Service that provides audio and braille library service via mail or digital download. They have a service which provides scheduled home delivery of material for people who cannot regularly visit the library due to a disabling condition.

=== Resources ===
Available through their A-Z Resources page on the website, the library has a list of 100+ resources patrons have access to. That includes resources for kids like ABC Mouse which is a learning tool for Pre-K through second grade children, to ArchiveGrid which has over 7 million archival records, to Legal Source which is a resource for current legal issues, studies, and trends in the world.
