= Ellwood House =

Historic house in Illinois, United States

- U.S. National Register of Historic Places
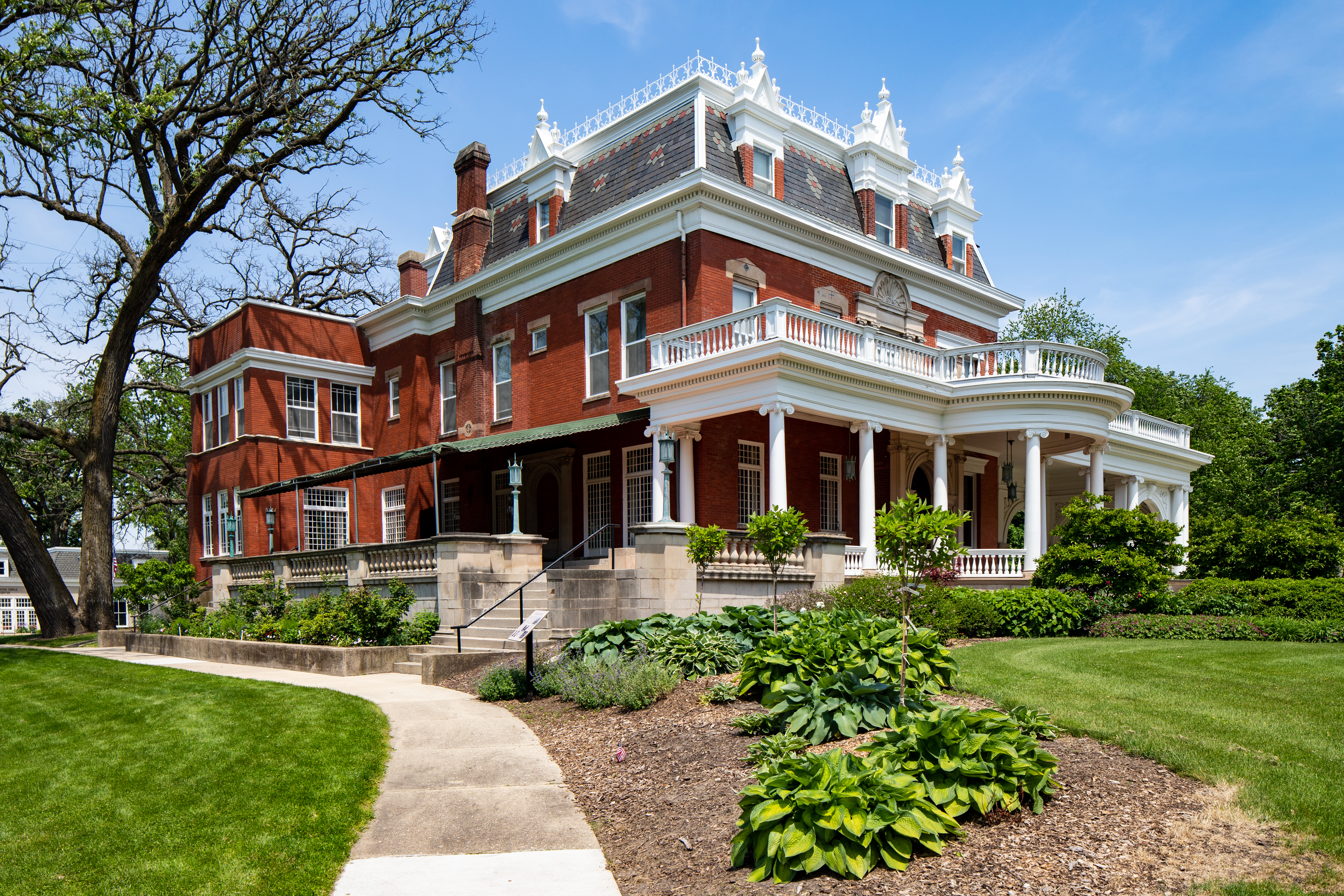
- Location: 509 N. 1st St., De Kalb, Illinois
- Coordinates: 41°55′53″N 88°45′1″W
- Area: 8.2 acres (3.3 ha)
- Built: 1879
- Architect: George O. Garnsey
- Architectural style: Gothic Revival, Victorian, Georgian, Colonial Revival
- NRHP reference No.: 75002075
- Added to NRHP: June 13, 1975

The Ellwood House was built as a private home by barbed wire entrepreneur Isaac Ellwood in 1879. It is located on First Street in DeKalb, Illinois, United States, in DeKalb County. The Victorian style home, designed by George O. Garnsey, underwent remodeling in 1898-1899 and 1911. The house was originally part of 1,000 acres (4.0 km^{2}) which included a large stable complex known as "Ellwood Green." Isaac Ellwood lived here until 1910 when he passed the estate to his son, Perry Ellwood.

After Perry Ellwood inherited the home he remodeled the interior and exterior, drastically altering the home's appearance. Thus, the Ellwood House incorporates elements from several architectural styles. In 1964 the home was donated to the city of DeKalb and converted into a museum. The house was listed on the U.S. National Register of Historic Places in 1975. The Ellwood House Museum site contains six structures in addition to the main house. A 50-foot (15 m) tall water tower dominates the west side of the property while a 14-foot (4.3-m) tall miniature Stick style house is located nearer the main house. There is also a Visitor Center, built as an addition to the Perry Ellwood family's original garage, and a museum house that was once used to hold Harriet Ellwood's (Isaac's wife) collection of "curiosities." The property also includes the "Ellwood-Nehring House," the home given to Perry and May Ellwood as a wedding gift in 1898. From 1940 until 2011, the house was privately owned by Paul Nehring, son of P.A. Nehring who owned Nehring Electrical Works, and his wife Shirley.

== History ==
Construction on the original mansion began in April 1879, George O. Garnsey, a Chicago architect, designed the Ellwood Mansion for DeKalb barbed wire entrepreneur Isaac Ellwood. At the time, Garnsey had designed other structures in DeKalb and Sycamore. By November 1879 the Ellwood family occupied the home. Newspaper accounts of the day put the cost somewhere between US$40,000 and $50,000. The original Ellwood House had a number of elements common to Victorian designed homes and combined several styles. Its mansard roof remains one of the home's most striking features. In addition, the home still incorporates Gothic columns, pitched gables, and a cast iron roof cresting with a trefoil design.

While Isaac Ellwood lived in the home large dinner parties, popular during the 19th century, were commonplace. The Ellwood House hosted prominent visitors throughout Isaac Ellwood's residence there. Theodore Roosevelt dined in the Ellwood House dining room while he was a candidate for Vice President of the United States in 1900. The dining room has also hosted U.S. Senators and U.S. state governors among other notable guests. Dinner parties at the Ellwood House followed customs typical to 19th century dinner partie. Guests "dressed" for the party, followed proper etiquette and were expected to know how to use the silverware properly.

The first remodeling work on the Ellwood Mansion took place as the 19th century drew to a close. The changes, commissioned by Isaac Ellwood, were meant to reflect more popular architectural styles including the Georgian and Colonial Revival. Many of the building's original Gothic features were replaced with more Classical elements. On the home's exterior, some of these changes can be observed in the addition of the portico and porte-cochere. Inside the home, the dining room was enlarged with the addition of the semicircular bay on the mansion's north facade.

Perry Ellwood inherited the house in 1910, and, together with his wife, May Ellwood (née Gurler), altered the mansion once again. The biggest changes were the addition of the terrace on the home's south face, a sunroom wing, and the relocation of the porte-cochere to the north side of the portico. This is the mansion that is visible today.

During World War II, and after Perry Ellwood died in 1943, May Ellwood again altered the home; to save on fuel oil, she had the upper floors of the house closed off. During this period, the library functioned as a guest room and a bathroom was added across the library's west wall. The bathroom was removed before the house opened as a museum in 1967. The library's plaster cornice and other architectural details have been restored based on a 1912 photograph. In 1964 the home was donated to the city of DeKalb and converted into a museum.

== Architecture ==
=== Exterior ===
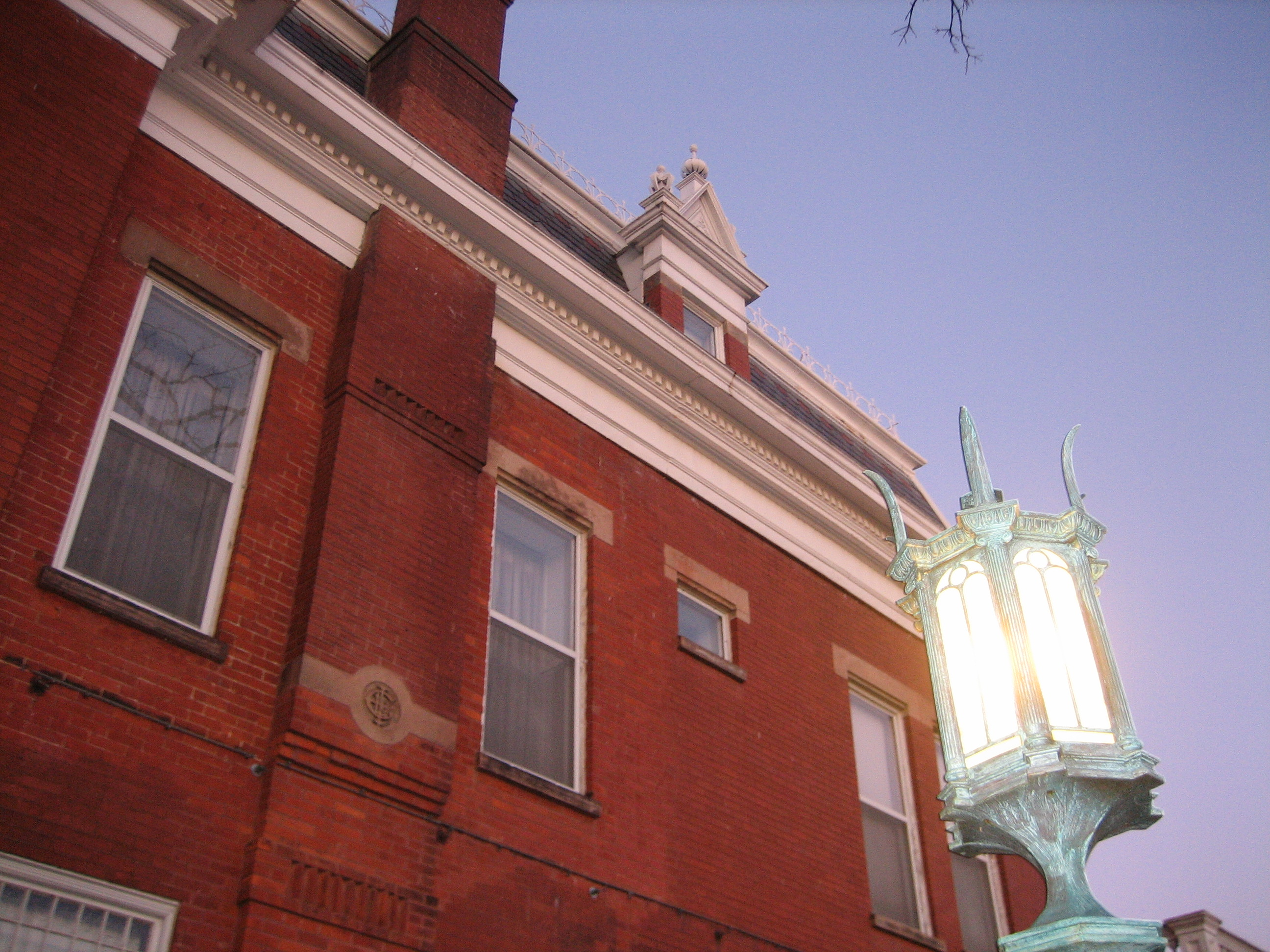
The dentils are visible in this image of the cornice that Isaac Ellwood added in 1899.

The three-story brick house includes a full elevated basement and a mansard roof with steeply pitched gabled dormers. Projecting from the roofline are plain corbeled chimneys and iron grillwork, the original roofing material was slate. The 1879 version of the Ellwood House featured dormer ornamentation with finial work. The original windows were all double-hung and of modest size, occurring both singly and in pairs while showing a variety of lintel designs. The original front (east) facade appeared much different than it does at present. The front entryway has been completely altered, due to Perry Ellwood's 1911 remodeling. The original entryway featured a one-story stone porch supported with two pilasters and two granite columns. The square projecting porch bay was connected to the ground via 12 stone stairs. In the southeast corner of the house was a full three-story projecting tower set at a 45° angle to the rest of the front facade.

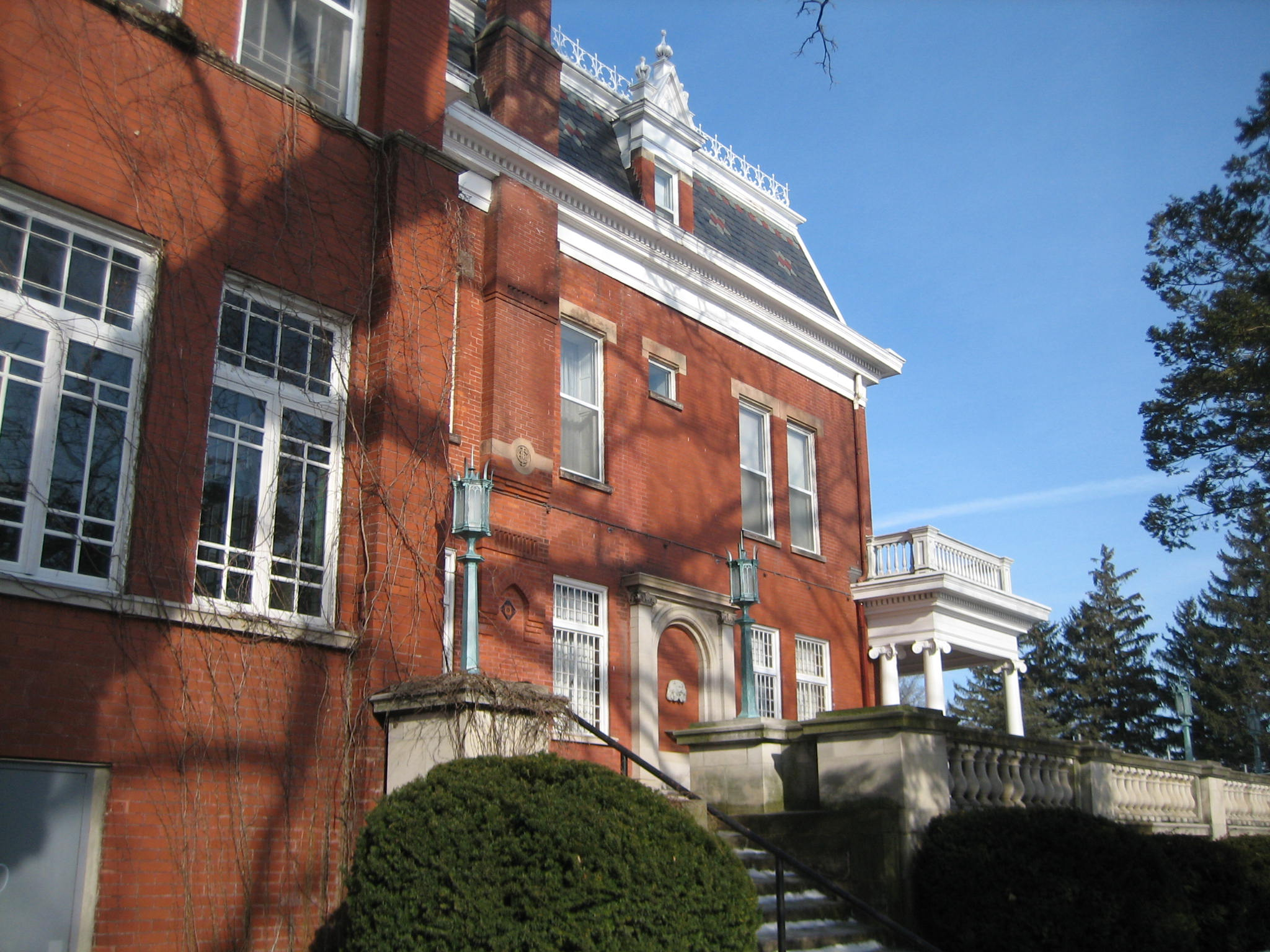
The terrace on the south side of the house was one of the 20th-century additions by Perry Ellwood.

Isaac Ellwood's 1898-1899 renovations were superficial, especially when compared to the alterations his son made to the original design a decade later. He had the bracketed cornice replaced with a Classical cornice with dentils and a projecting molding. The window lintels were altered in a style similar to the new cornice. On the tower, the two windows on the first floor were replaced with one larger window while the projecting bay over the east portico was removed and made flush with the rest of the house. The windows over that portico were replaced with a heavy double door that opened onto the roof over the veranda, which had been built over the entire front of the house. It was during this time that the first porte-cochere was built on the south side of the home.

Perry Ellwood undertook major renovations which added and changed rooms in 1910. On the home's exterior the porte cochere was moved from the south facade to its present position on the north facade. On the south side of the home a large brick terrace was added and the conservatory moved from the southwest side of the house to the rear (west). The full-length tower on the home's southwest corner was entirely removed during this renovation.

=== Interior ===
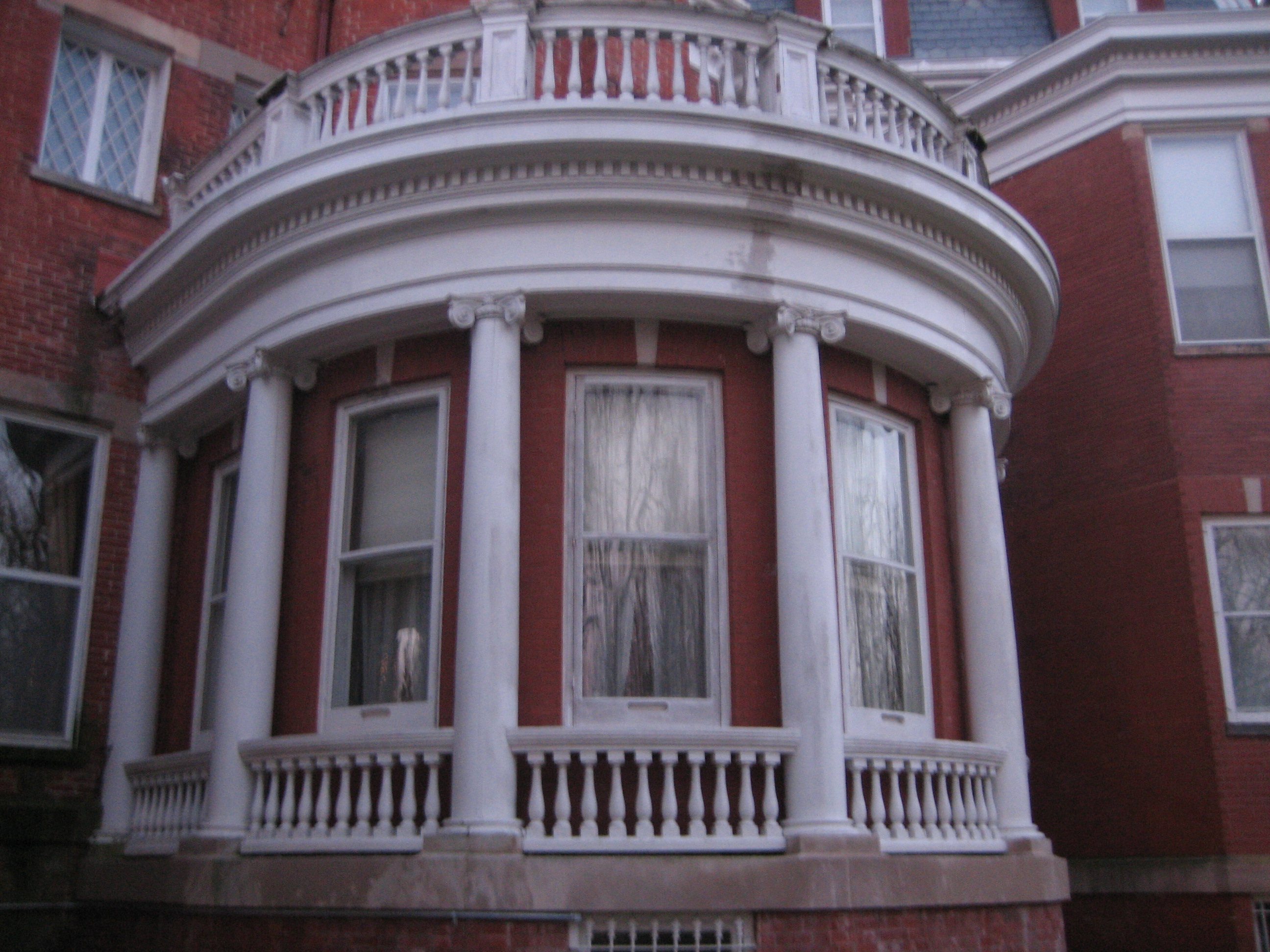
The dining room bay addition from the exterior on the north facade.

The general layout of the home's interior has remained basically the same throughout the remodelings; the rooms on each floor are accessed via a large central hallway which ends in an elegant rotunda. However, some of the changes made in 1910 and 1911 did alter the interior appearance. The parlor was converted into the library and the library was converted into the dining room after an extension was added on. In the home's northwest corner a large kitchen was added, on the second-floor, the room above the kitchen became servant's quarters.

Upon entering the Ellwood House, guests of Isaac or Perry Ellwood would have been greeted or formally welcomed by members of the family. After Perry Ellwood inherited the house in 1910 the entry parlor began to become known as the library. Prominent among the library's features is a carved Italian marble mantle with a large gilt mirror hung above it. The library's bookshelves are cast in a Neo-Italian Renaissance style and constructed of fine mahogany. Presently filling the shelves in the Ellwood House are a large collection of books with Ellwood family nameplates. Near the library window, which is adorned with its original walnut shutters, is an 1890s French statue. The statue was donated to the Ellwood House Association from someone in Sycamore who bequeathed it to the museum.

The dining room's underwent an extensive remodel in 1898 because of Ellwood's rise to national prominence through his barbed wire partnership with Joseph Glidden. The room was enlarged through the addition of a semi-circular bay. Beyond the addition, the room was refurnished and redecorated to reflect the Georgian Revival alterations that were occurring on the home's exterior. Elements of Georgian Revival architecture that were incorporated into the Ellwood dining room remodel include, mahogany paneling with dentil molding around the windows and doors, a cornice with Classical details, and brackets. Almost all of the dining room's 1898 furniture and woodwork was custom made by Tobey & Company of Chicago and each piece is affixed with a dated brass plate. The main dining room table and chairs were cast in an early Georgian style and the table has twelve extra leaves which can extend it the length of the room. The dining room's smaller table, situated within the bay addition, was used for Ellwood family breakfasts.

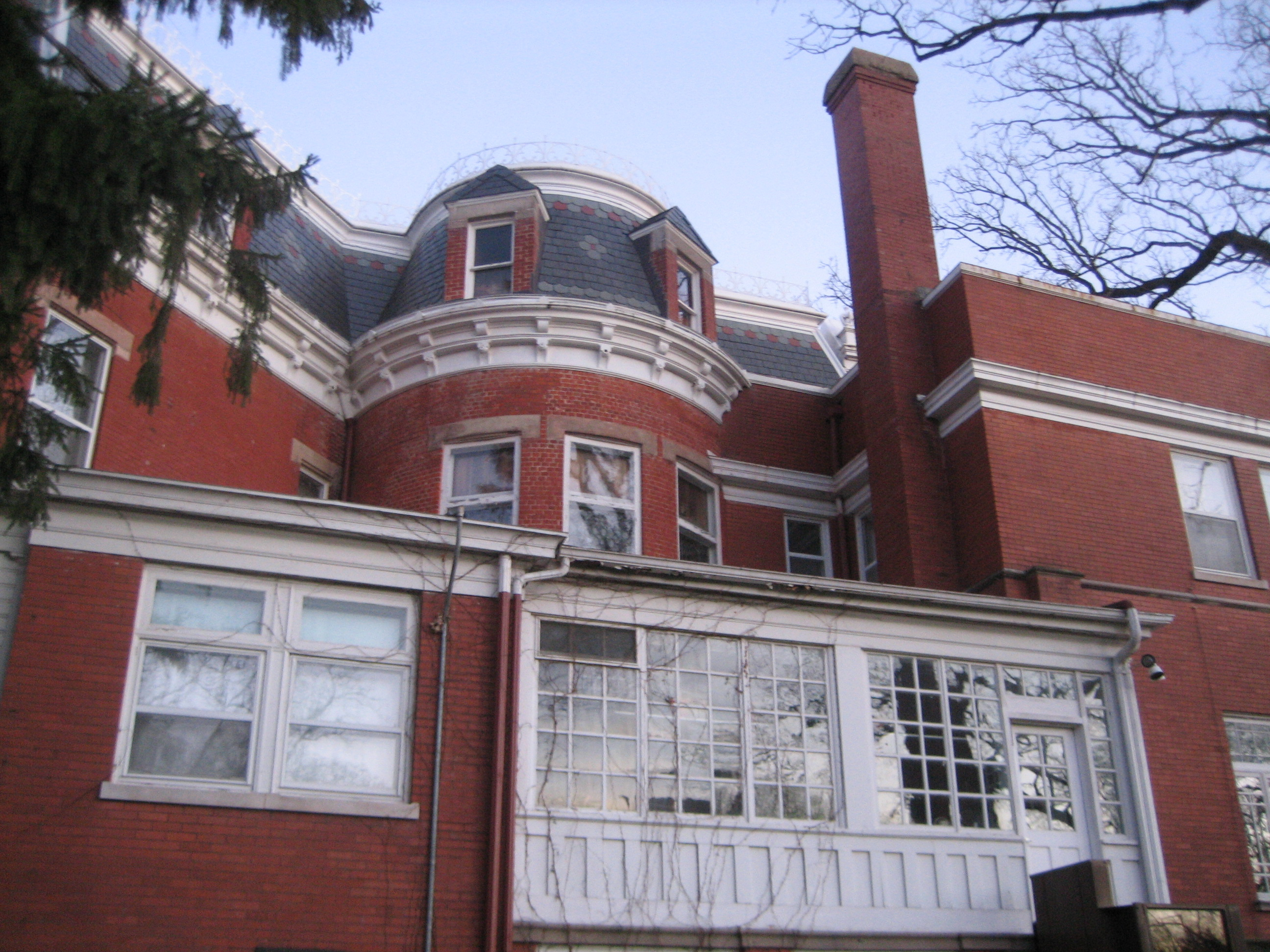
The sunroom was designed in an Arts and Crafts motif and added to the Ellwood House in 1911.

The Ellwood House living room did not exist until Perry Ellwood's 1911 remodeling. The original living room space was laid out as two rooms with pocket doors joining them. In the living room, a wall between the sitting room was removed which created a large, open space to which a vaulted ceiling was added. Perry Ellwood's living room was designed to function with the newly added sunroom and south terrace as one large living and entertaining space. The terrace can be accessed through French doors from both the living room and sunroom. The living room was designed to reflect English country houses c. 1650, during the Stuart period. The room was designed by Roy Terwilliger, an interior designer with Marshall Field & Company in Chicago and May Ellwood's cousin. The living room features a "pargework" ceiling constructed of molded plaster and designed with a geometric theme. The large, Caen stone fireplace was carved in Chicago in 1911. The sunroom was designed in the late 19th century and early 20th century Arts and Crafts style causing it to stand in stark contrast to the living room. The room was originally furnished with Mission style furniture to complement the oak woodwork.

== Museum ==
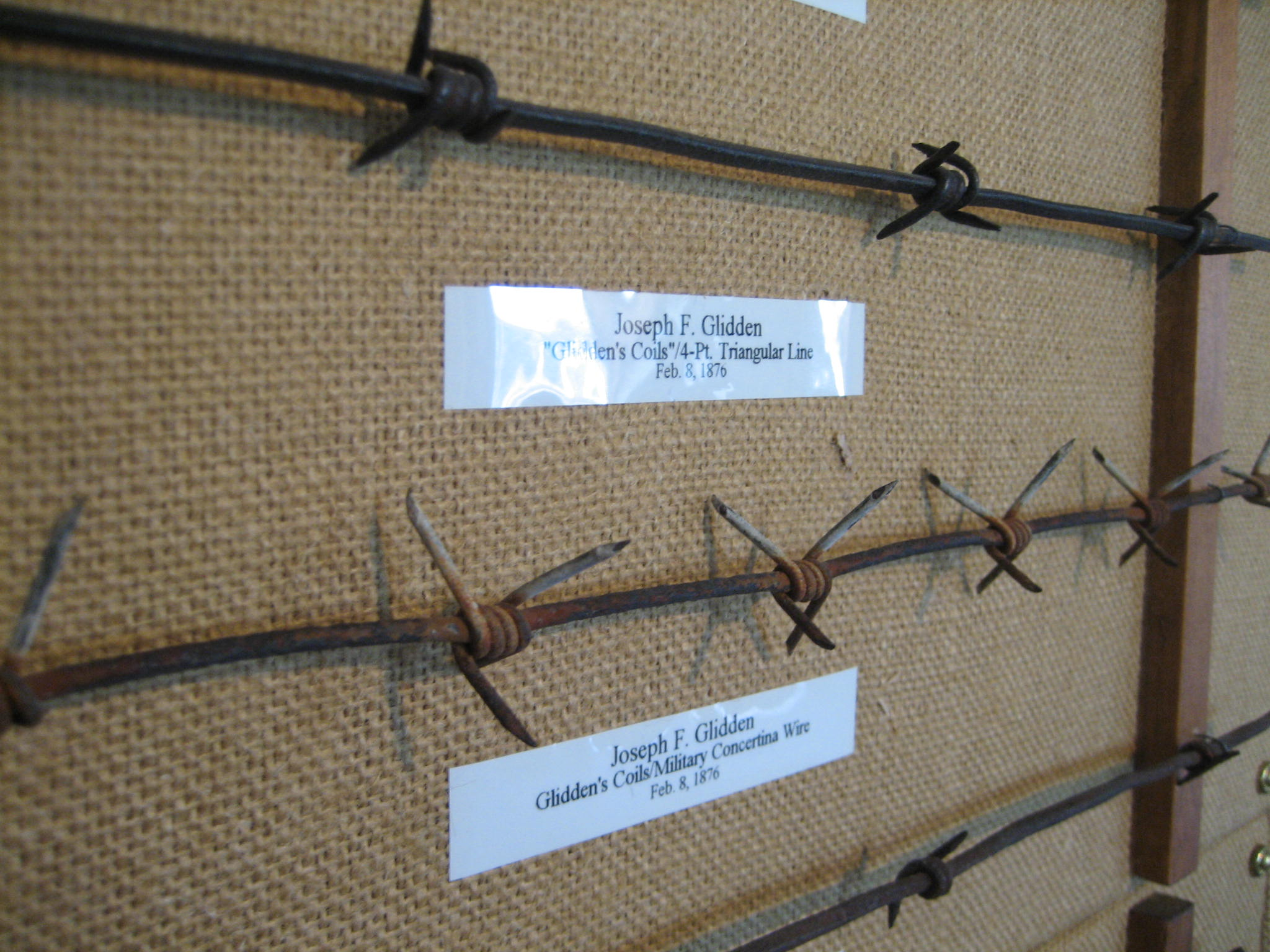
The museum includes a barbed wire history gallery which contains authentic examples of early barbed wire.

Shortly before her death in 1964 May Ellwood donated the house to the DeKalb Park District for use as a historic house museum. The Ellwood House site is about 8.5 acres (34,000 m^{2}) which includes a wooded area to the north of the house; all that remains of the original 1,000 acres (4.0 km^{2}). The house is now a museum, operated jointly by the Ellwood House Association and the DeKalb Park District and they offer guided tours for a fee. The museum offers tours seasonally beginning in late spring and ending after the annual holiday celebration in December. The Ellwood House Museum has a visitor center, which includes a barbed wire gallery, carriage gallery, special exhibits gallery, and a gift shop. The museum offers tourists a chance to glimpse what life was like for the Ellwoods. As part of the DeKalb Park District, the grounds are open to the public, and available for rental for use on public and private events. The DeKalb Area Garden Club hosts an annual Flower Show, community members hold weddings in the garden or visitors center, and the Ellwood House Association holds an annual Art Show, Ice Cream Social, and other events.

== Outbuildings ==
=== Water tower ===
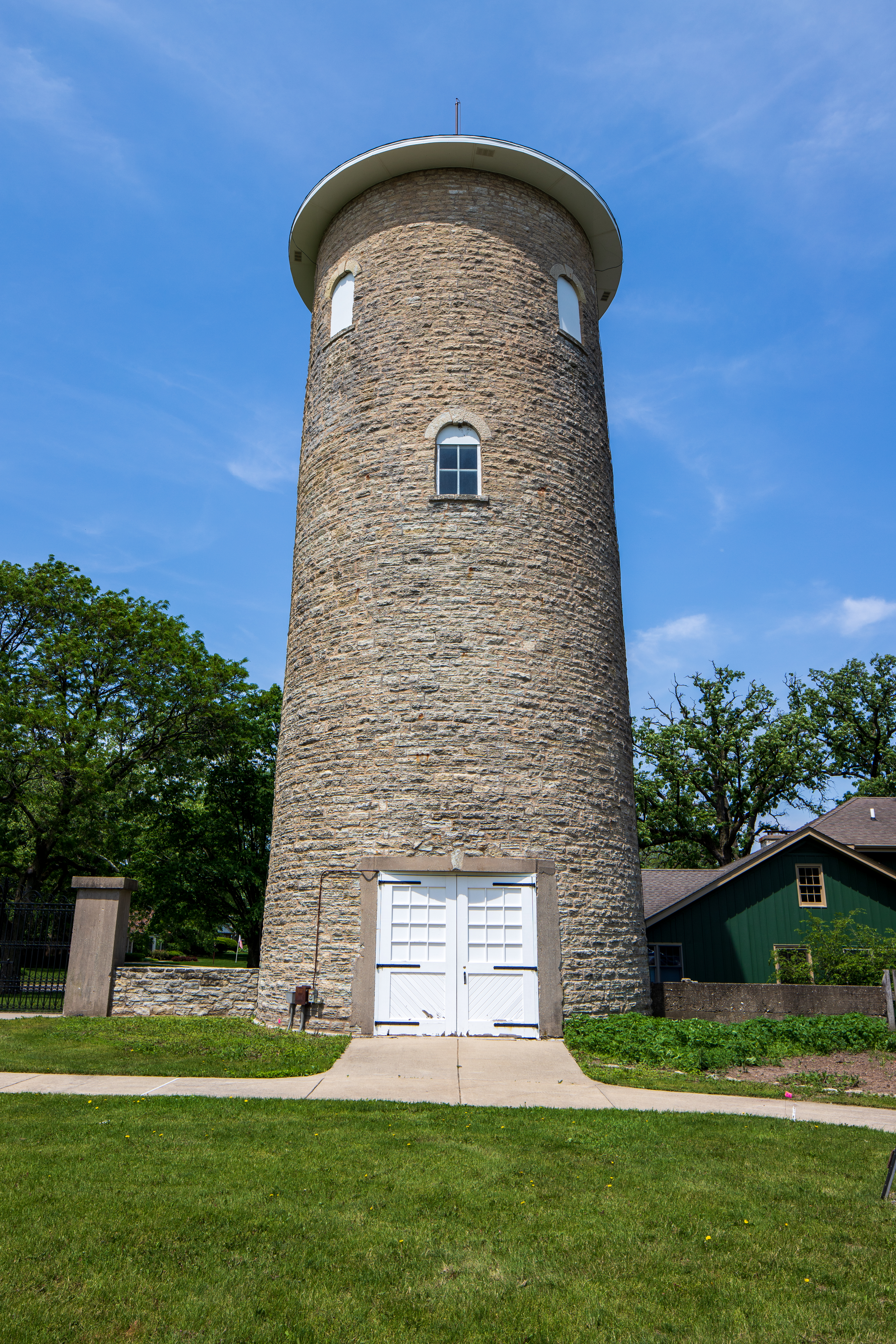
The water tower is the only surviving structure from the "Ellwood Green" stable complex.

The Ellwood House grounds hold several extant outbuildings as well: the museum house, the carriage house, the water tower, and the Little House. On the west (rear) of the Ellwood House, the circular limestone water tower is about 50 feet (15 m) tall and has a diameter of 18 feet (5.5 m). The tower has windows occurring at different levels, which are arched and include keystones in their design. The water tower was built in 1879, the same year as Ellwood House, and at that time the structure was topped with a wooden water tank with a conical roof. Between 1897 and 1910 the wooden tank was removed and replaced with an additional 30 courses of stone which matched the original structure. The arched door at the base of the water tower was replaced with a larger square-shaped double door. The roof remained conical and of wood construction until about 1950 when it was replaced with sheet metal.

The water tower is the only surviving structure from what was once a large horse stable facility owned by Isaac Ellwood. The complex, known as "Ellwood Green," was affiliated with the family's Percheron horse business. Two major structures within the complex, were the 1879 brick stable buildings, both of which featured mansard roofs. Those buildings, along with all other original stable buildings (save the water tower and including the home stable) were demolished through the years.

=== Carriage house ===
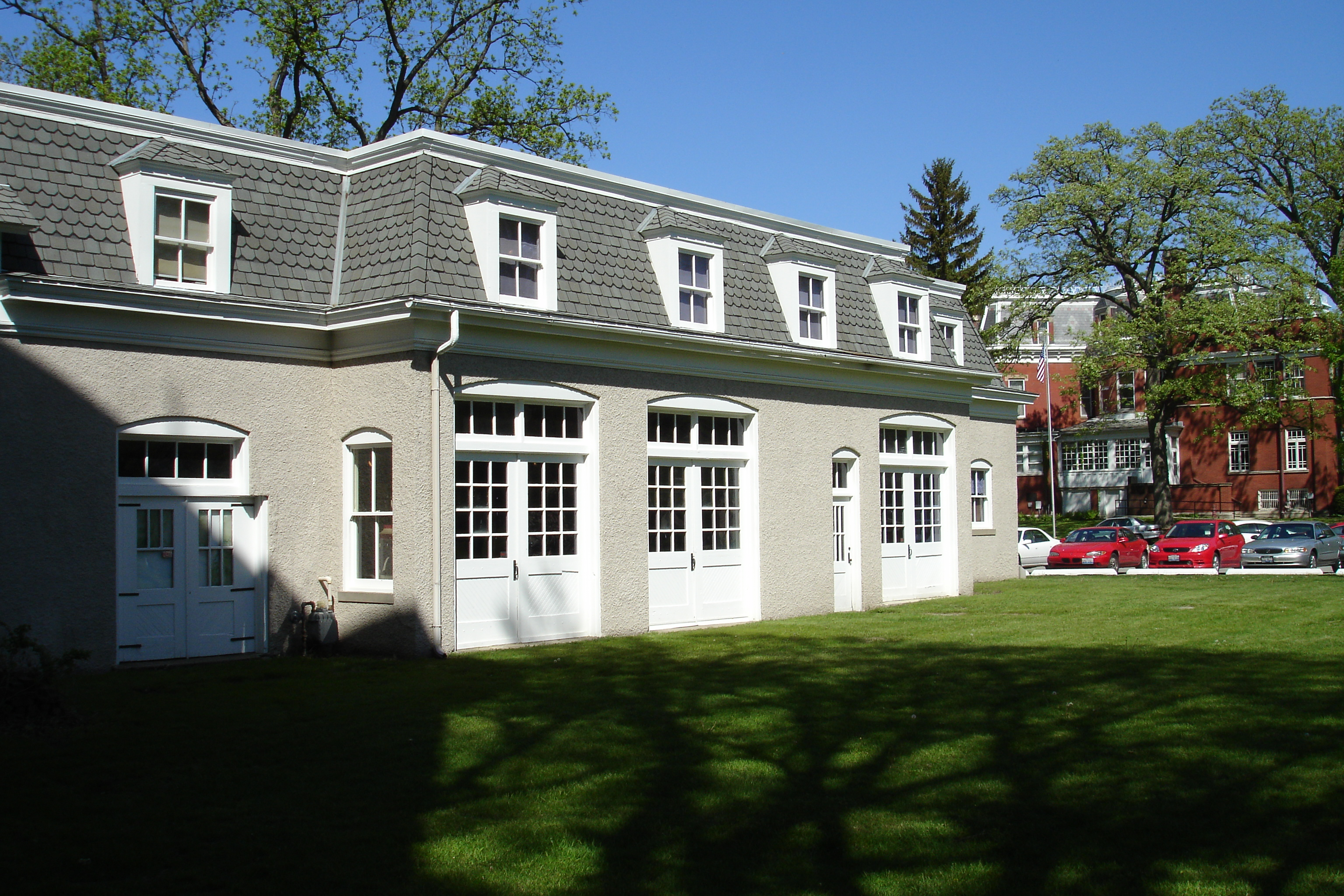
The stucco covered carriage house.

Another of the property's buildings, commonly called the carriage house, never lived up to its popular name. The building never housed any carriages; it was, in fact, built to house automobiles. The southern section of the carriage house was constructed sometime between 1908 and 1912 and features a mansard roof. The building is sheathed in stucco and presently houses a collection of antique carriages and sleighs as well as a barbed wire history museum.

The carriage house, today the Ellwood House Museum's Education and Visitors Center, was built by Perry Ellwood as a multi-car garage. It had a grease pit for automobile repair work. On the second floor was an apartment for the Ellwood family chauffeur. The building originally had garage doors on both sides so cars could drive in one side and out the other side of the structure. The original doors are on display inside the Ellwood House Visitors Center.

=== Museum House ===
The one-story red brick Museum House, another of the site's outbuildings, stands to the south of the main house and was built in 1905 for Isaac Ellwood's wife Harriett. The Ellwood's grandchildren and other family members referred to the museum house as the "Curiosity Shop." She used the building to store the many curiosities and items she collected while traveling throughout the world. Some of these items included Native American artifacts, minerals, seashells, and other specimens. The museum house measures almost exactly 25 feet (7.6 m) on all four sides and has two doorways, one on the east and one on the north side. On its interior some of the museum house's original oak display cases are still intact.

The Museum House is cast in Classical Revival style and was the last outbuilding constructed for Isaac Ellwood on the property. Today the Museum House's exterior appears much the same as it did when it was newly constructed but for many years the structure was badly deteriorated. After Harriet Ellwood died in 1910 the objects remained inside the building while it began to decline. By 1934 the building was in serious need of repair and by the 1970s both porches were gone and the only way into the building was through the north door. The museum house restoration was undertaken more than ten years later. Prior to the addition of the Visitors Center to the Carriage House, the Museum House served as the visitors center and housed staff offices.

=== Little House ===
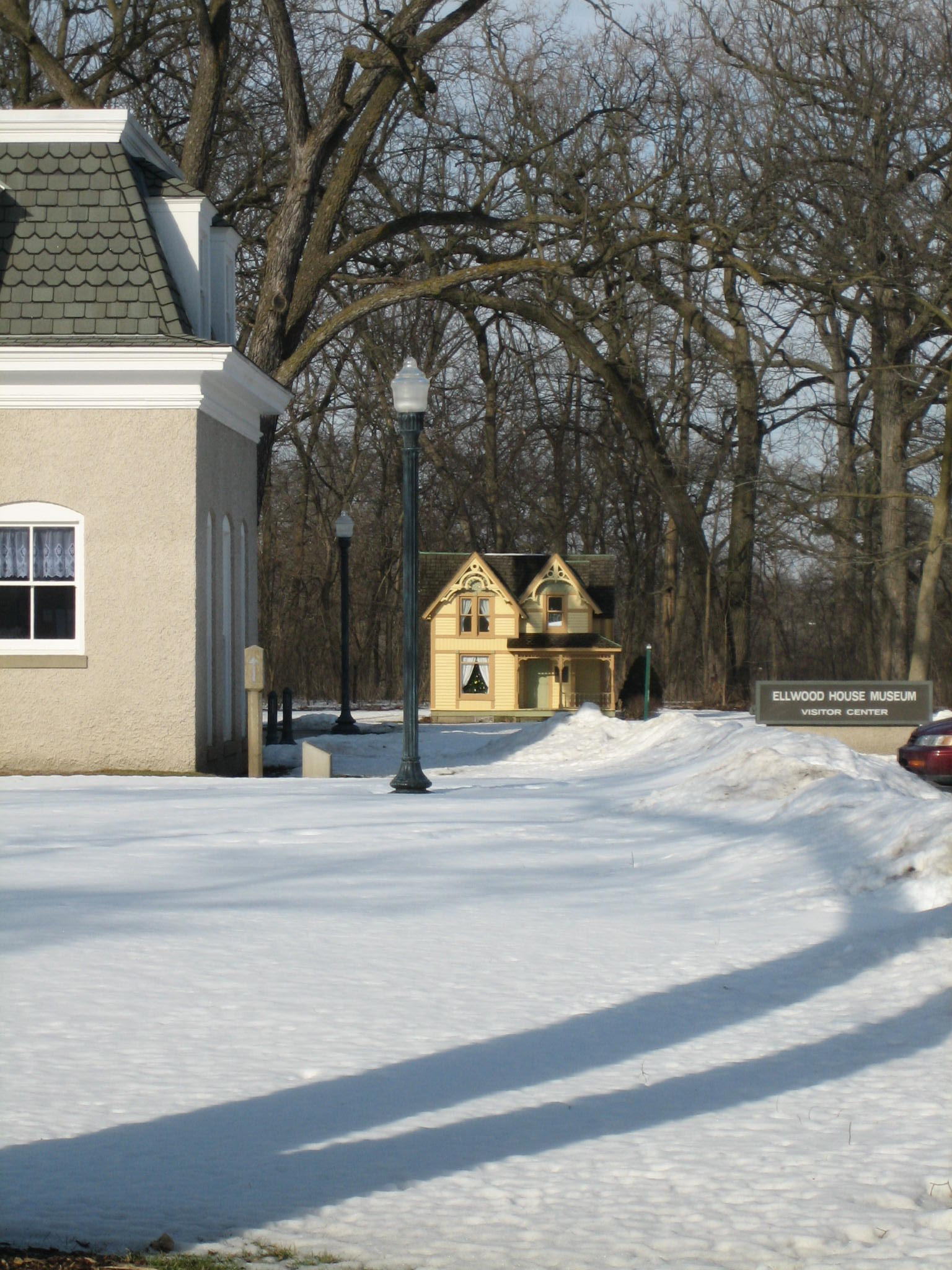
The Little House is dwarfed by the carriage house to its southwest.

On the west (rear) side of the home, near the carriage house, is a miniature Stick style house known as Little House. Little House is 13 by 15 feet (4.0 by 4.6 m) and stands 14 feet (4.3 m) above its concrete foundation. Little House was built in 1892 with assistance from every carpenter in DeKalb; the house was to be used as a float in a local parade. After the parade Isaac Ellwood's son, Will, bought the house and had it placed on the Ellwood House property in the same location it stands today. The house was used by Will's two daughters and later by Perry Ellwood's children.

Between that time and 1973 the house had four or five other owners and it was moved several times. Eventually, the Little House wound up at the property of Mr. and Mrs. Burt Oderkirk, on Annie Glidden Road, where it again served as a playhouse for the couple's children. At this point it was painted white, with green shutters. In 1973 Mrs. Oderkirk donated Little House to Ellwood House Association and it was returned to its place on the Ellwood property. In 1986 the Little House was restored to a Victorian paint scheme.

== Significance ==
The house is most significant for its connection to Isaac Ellwood, who has been given credit, in part, for Joseph Glidden's invention of barbed wire. Glidden's patent was earlier, thus Ellwood's connection with the actual invention is vague. He did, however, play a chief role in organizing the barbed wire industry into a viable and profitable business. Isaac Ellwood lived in the home throughout his later years and made his home in DeKalb through all of his years in barbed wire. The Ellwood House, including the four contributing properties on its 8.2-acre (33,000 m^{2}) site, were added to the U.S. National Register of Historic Places on June 13, 1975.

== See also ==
- Chauncey Ellwood House
- Gurler House
- Jacob Haish
- Joseph F. Glidden House
- Sycamore Historic District
