= DeKalb Genetics Corporation =

Agriculture company and subsidiary of Bayer

DEKALB Genetics Corporation
- Type: Subsidiary
- Founded: DeKalb, Illinois (1912)
- Products: crop seeds, chickens
- Parent: Bayer

DeKalb Genetics Corporation (often stylized DEKALB; formerly DeKalb Agricultural Association and DeKalb AgResearch) was a diversified company headquartered in DeKalb, Illinois that marketed agricultural seeds and other products. The company was best known for its leading role in the development of hybrid corn and for its "winged ear" logo. DeKalb Genetics Corporation was purchased by the Monsanto Company in 1998 and has been owned since 2017 by Bayer. The DeKalb seed business, the DeKalb brand and the winged ear logo are now owned and managed by Bayer.

== Corporate history ==
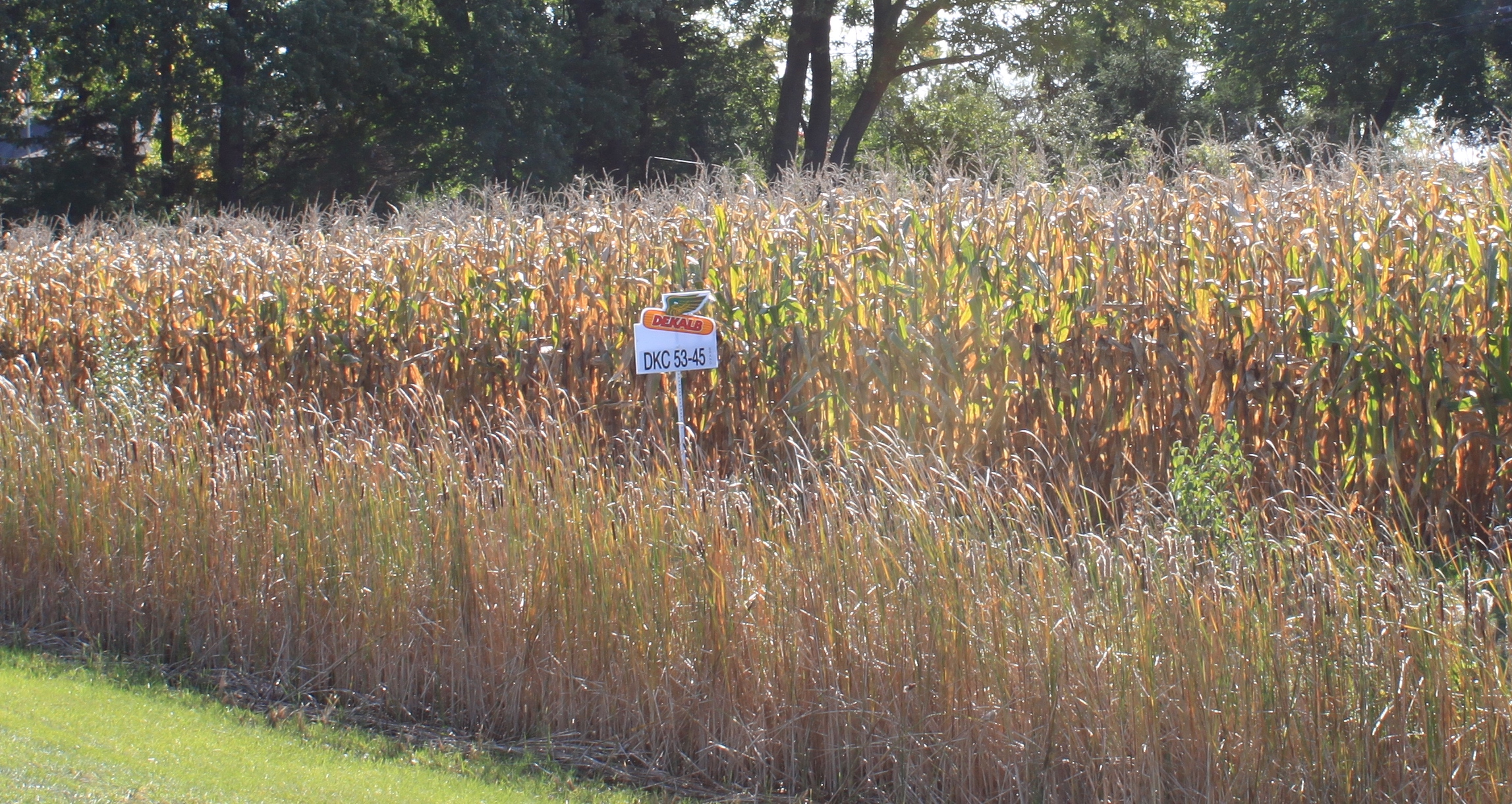
Corn field planted with DeKalb DKC 53-45 seed

The Farm Bureau county organization was founded in DeKalb, Illinois in 1912. Tom Roberts, Sr. became the assistant manager in 1919 and then manager from 1920 to 1932. In 1923 Henry C. Wallace, the Secretary of Agriculture, spoke at the DeKalb Farm Bureau picnic and recommended development of hybrid corn. Roberts took up the project, even though he understood there would be a 12-year lead time before he could bring a product to market. As a result of this effort DeKalb AgResearch sold hybrid corn seed beginning in 1935. Sales expanded rapidly as Roberts organized a force of farmer-dealers, who were paid a 15% commission. The first popular hybrid was DeKalb 404A, which sold 508,000 bags in 1947, the same year total DeKalb sales exceeded 2,000,000 bags of seed corn. The first popular full- and short-season, large volume, single-cross maize hybrids were DeKalb hybrids 805 and XL 45. As a result, DeKalb was the leader in U.S. hybrid seed corn sales from the mid-1930s until the mid-1970s (Crabb 1948. Roberts 1999).

In 1982 DeKalb formed a joint venture with Pfizer, called DeKalb-Pfizer Genetics, and in 1985 the name was changed to DeKalb Corporation. The seed business was spun off as DeKalb Genetics Corporation in 1988.

Monsanto first entered the corn seed business when it purchased 40% of DeKalb in 1996. It purchased the remainder of the corporation in 1998. The last president of the company before the acquisition was Richard O. Ryan.
