= DeKalb, Illinois =

City in DeKalb County, Illinois, United States

- City
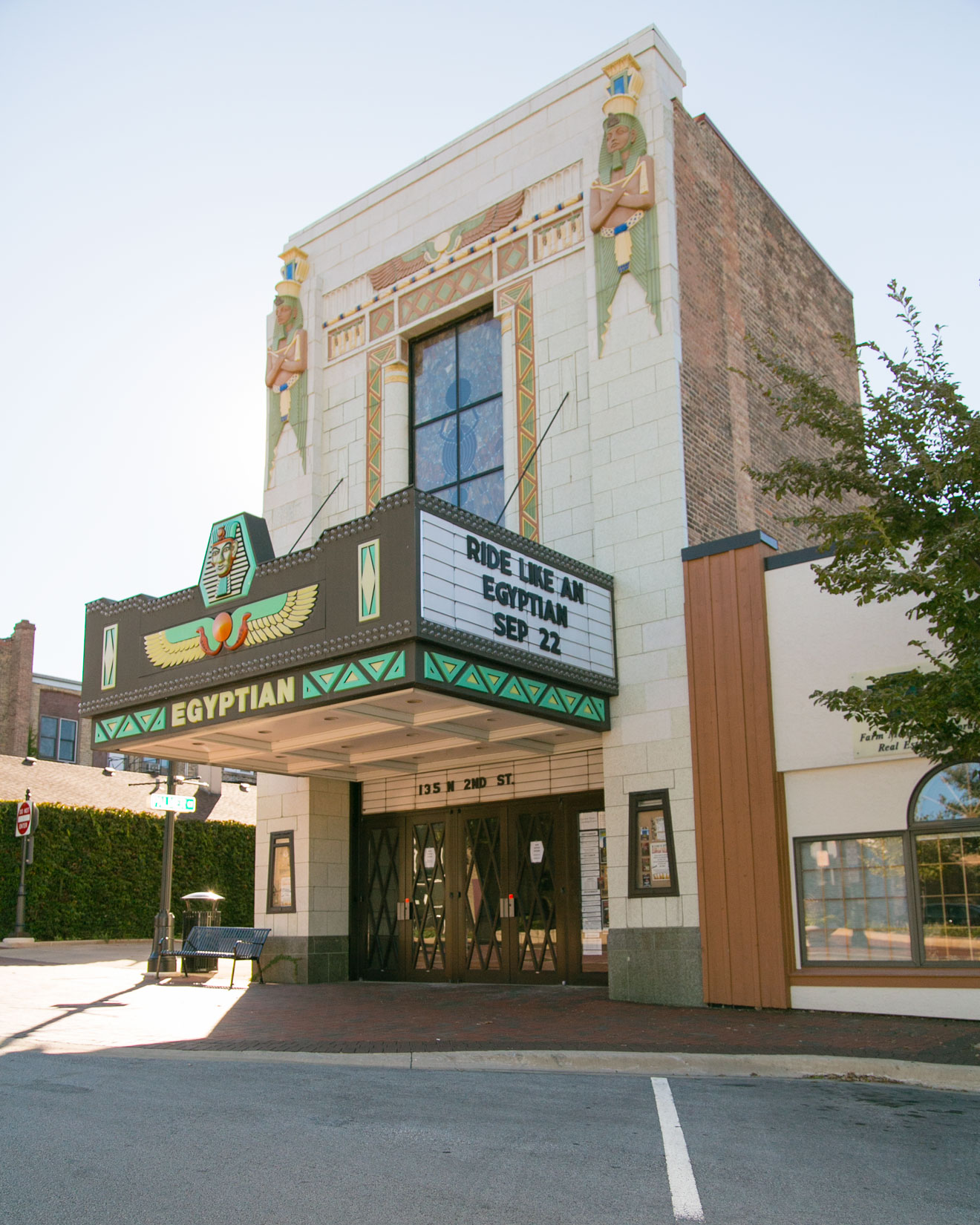
- The Egyptian Theatre in Downtown DeKalb

- Logo
- Nickname: Barb City
- Interactive map of DeKalb, Illinois
- Location within Illinois Location within the United States
- Coordinates: 41°55′46″N 88°45′30″W
- Country: United States
- State: Illinois
- County: DeKalb
- Incorporated: 1856
- Named for: Johann de Kalb

Area
  - City: 17.12 sq mi (44.33 km^{2})
  - Land: 16.95 sq mi (43.91 km^{2})
  - Water: 0.17 sq mi (0.43 km^{2})
- Elevation: 883 ft (269 m)

Population (2020)
  - City: 40,290
  - Density: 2,376.7/sq mi (917.66/km^{2})
  - Urban: 68,545
- Time zone: UTC−6 (CST)
  - Summer (DST): UTC−5 (CDT)
- ZIP codes: 60115
- Area code: 815
- FIPS code: 17-19161
- GNIS feature ID: 2394494
- Website: www.cityofdekalb.com

DeKalb (/dɪˈkælb/ dih-KALB) is a city in DeKalb County, Illinois, United States. The population was 40,290 at the 2020 census. The city is named after decorated Franconian-French war hero Johann de Kalb, who died during the American Revolutionary War.

Founded in 1856, DeKalb became important in the development and manufacture of barbed wire, especially for agriculture and raising livestock. While agricultural-related industries remain a facet of the city, along with health and services, the city's largest employer in the 21st century is Northern Illinois University, founded in 1895. DeKalb is about 65 miles (105 km) west of downtown Chicago.

== History ==
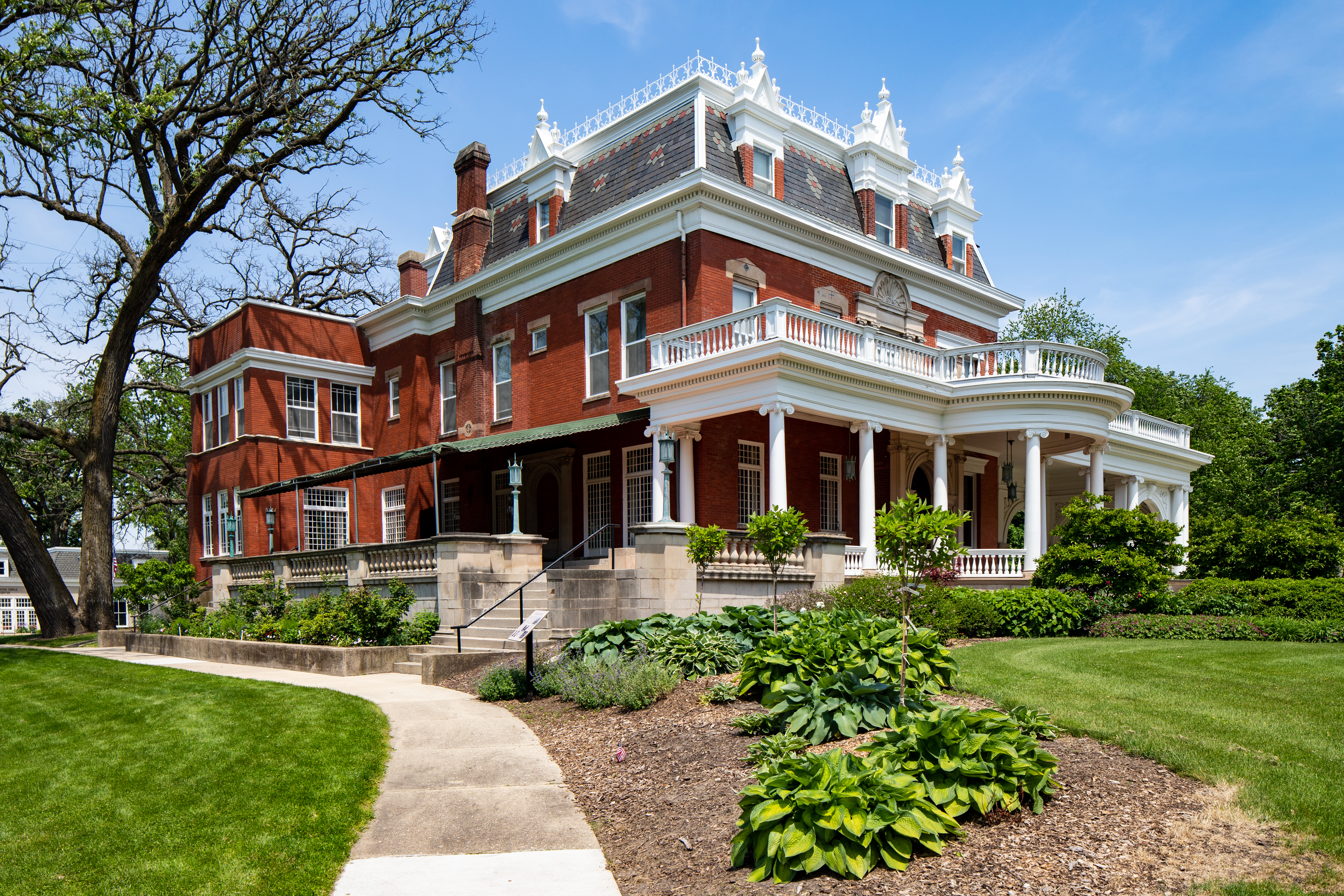
Ellwood House, the home of entrepreneur Isaac L. Ellwood

DeKalb was originally called Huntley's Grove, and under the latter name was platted in 1853. The name is for Baron Johann de Kalb, a major general in the American Revolutionary War. The first church in DeKalb was organized in 1844. Beginning in 1846, a stage coach traveled from Chicago through DeKalb and Dixon to Galena. A post office has been in operation at DeKalb since 1849. The first railroad reached DeKalb in 1853.

Barbed wire was a key product in DeKalb's history. Joseph Glidden (1813–1906), a DeKalb resident since about 1850, received a patent in 1874 for inventing the conventional double-strand barbed wire that remains in common use around the world today. Glidden and Isaac L. Ellwood (1833–1910) manufactured barbed wire in DeKalb, initially as the Barb Fence Company. Successor companies included the 1881 Superior Barbed Wire Company, which merged into American Steel and Wire in 1898 and finally became United States Steel. Between 1892 and 1898 Glidden and Ellwood played substantial parts in establishing the state teachers college that became Northern Illinois University.

DeKalb played a leading role in the development of commercial hybrid corn. From a base in the early county Farm Bureau, the DeKalb Agricultural Association produced large quantities of high-yield seed varieties, beginning in 1934. Until the mid-1970s, more American farmers planted DeKalb hybrid corn than any other brand. The DeKalb logo was a flying ear of corn. A series of joint ventures and mergers beginning in 1982 resulted in the DeKalb brand of agricultural products being owned by Bayer since 2017.

== Geography ==
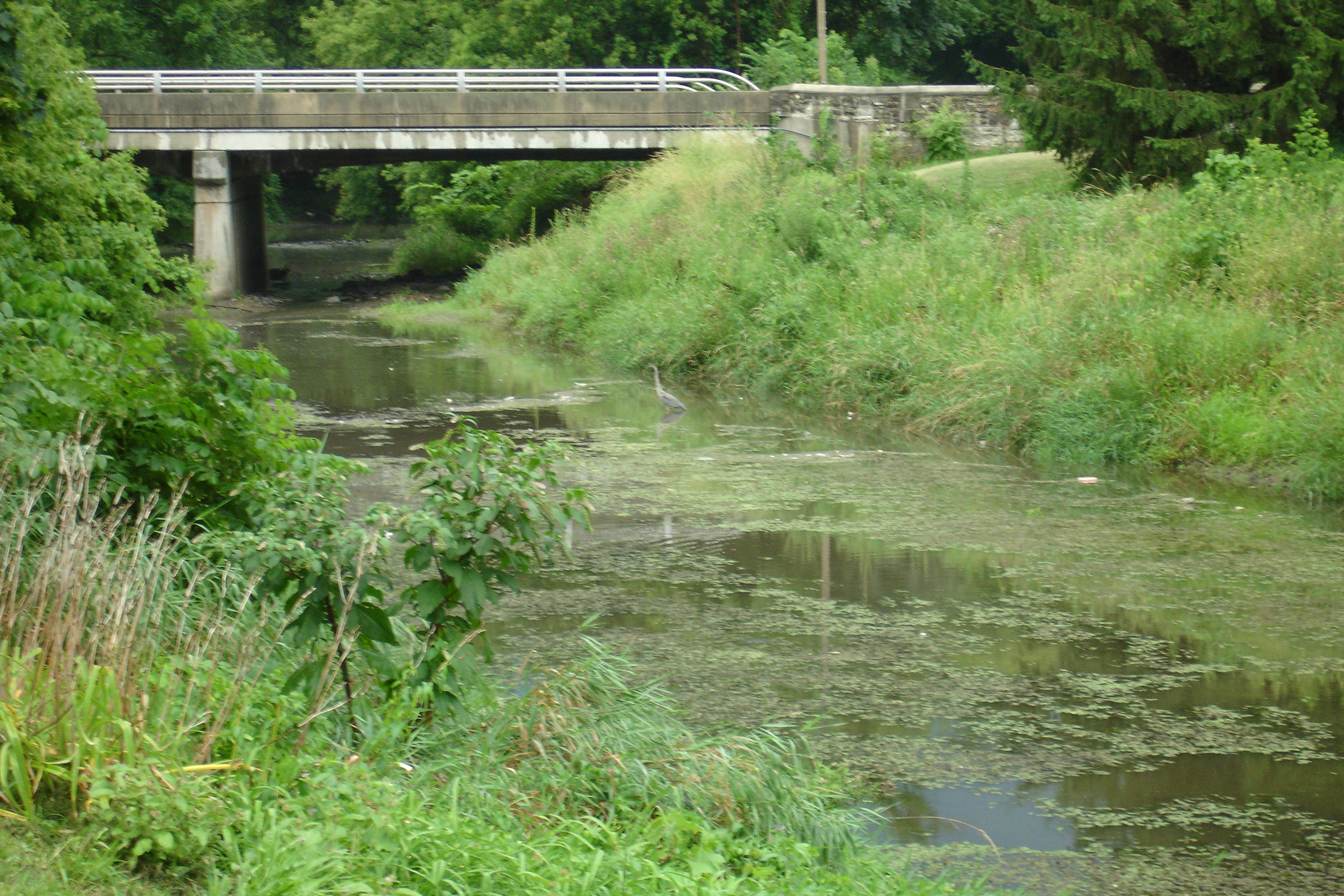
The Kishwaukee River

DeKalb is in northern Illinois, about 65 miles (105 km) west of downtown Chicago and 30 miles southeast of Rockford. The South Branch Kishwaukee River flows northward through DeKalb.

According to the 2021 census gazetteer files, DeKalb has a total area of 17.12 square miles (44.34 km^{2}), of which 16.95 square miles (43.90 km^{2}) (or 99.03%) is land and 0.17 square miles (0.44 km^{2}) (or 0.97%) is water.

On August 24, 2007, the Kishwaukee River at DeKalb crested at 15.27 feet (4.65 m) (all-time record 15.8 feet (4.8 m)), causing major flooding. This was only the second time the river has risen above 15 feet (4.6 m) since the level of the river has been recorded.

=== Climate ===
DeKalb has a humid continental climate (Köppen climate classification Dfa) typical of northern Illinois, with four distinct seasons. Summers can be hot, while winters are cold and snowy. Precipitation is somewhat uniform year-round, although it can be heavier in the spring and summer when the area is prone to strong thunderstorms.

Climate data for DeKalb, Illinois (1991–2020 normals, extremes 1966–present)
Month	Jan	Feb	Mar	Apr	May	Jun	Jul	Aug	Sep	Oct	Nov	Dec	Year
Record high °F (°C)	63 (17)	69 (21)	84 (29)	92 (33)	96 (36)	101 (38)	102 (39)	103 (39)	94 (34)	89 (32)	76 (24)	69 (21)	103 (39)
Mean daily maximum °F (°C)	28.1 (−2.2)	32.5 (0.3)	45.0 (7.2)	58.6 (14.8)	70.2 (21.2)	79.9 (26.6)	83.1 (28.4)	81.2 (27.3)	74.9 (23.8)	62.0 (16.7)	46.3 (7.9)	33.6 (0.9)	57.9 (14.4)
Daily mean °F (°C)	20.6 (−6.3)	24.5 (−4.2)	35.9 (2.2)	48.0 (8.9)	59.7 (15.4)	69.7 (20.9)	73.2 (22.9)	71.3 (21.8)	64.0 (17.8)	51.5 (10.8)	37.9 (3.3)	26.3 (−3.2)	48.5 (9.2)
Mean daily minimum °F (°C)	13.1 (−10.5)	16.6 (−8.6)	26.8 (−2.9)	37.3 (2.9)	49.2 (9.6)	59.5 (15.3)	63.3 (17.4)	61.3 (16.3)	53.2 (11.8)	41.0 (5.0)	29.6 (−1.3)	19.1 (−7.2)	39.2 (4.0)
Record low °F (°C)	−27 (−33)	−26 (−32)	−13 (−25)	8 (−13)	24 (−4)	34 (1)	43 (6)	39 (4)	27 (−3)	13 (−11)	−8 (−22)	−22 (−30)	−27 (−33)
Average precipitation inches (mm)	1.69 (43)	1.71 (43)	2.24 (57)	3.56 (90)	4.79 (122)	4.57 (116)	4.00 (102)	4.06 (103)	3.32 (84)	2.96 (75)	2.31 (59)	2.04 (52)	37.25 (946)
Average snowfall inches (cm)	10.2 (26)	8.7 (22)	4.4 (11)	1.3 (3.3)	0.0 (0.0)	0.0 (0.0)	0.0 (0.0)	0.0 (0.0)	0.0 (0.0)	0.1 (0.25)	1.8 (4.6)	6.6 (17)	33.1 (84)
Average precipitation days (≥ 0.01 in)	9.8	8.4	9.8	12.3	12.9	11.0	10.1	9.0	9.0	10.2	8.6	10.3	121.4
Average snowy days (≥ 0.1 in)	7.0	5.2	3.0	0.7	0.0	0.0	0.0	0.0	0.0	0.1	1.7	6.0	23.7
Source: NOAA

== Demographics ==
=== Racial and ethnic composition ===
DeKalb city, Illinois – Racial and ethnic composition Note: the US Census treats Hispanic/Latino as an ethnic category. This table excludes Latinos from the racial categories and assigns them to a separate category. Hispanics/Latinos may be of any race.
Race / Ethnicity (NH = Non-Hispanic)	Pop 2000	Pop 2010	Pop 2020	% 2000	% 2010	% 2020
White alone (NH)	29,479	30,238	22,211	75.55%	68.94%	55.13%
Black or African American alone (NH)	3,508	5,494	7,296	8.99%	12.53%	18.11%
Native American or Alaska Native alone (NH)	63	48	44	0.16%	0.11%	0.11%
Asian alone (NH)	1,796	1,769	1,570	4.60%	4.03%	3.90%
Native Hawaiian or Pacific Islander alone (NH)	32	8	15	0.08%	0.02%	0.04%
Other race alone (NH)	47	65	160	0.12%	0.15%	0.40%
Mixed race or Multiracial (NH)	566	736	1,809	1.45%	1.68%	4.49%
Hispanic or Latino (any race)	3,527	5,504	7,185	9.04%	12.55%	17.83%
Total	39,018	43,862	40,290	100.00%	100.00%	100.00%

=== 2020 census ===
As of the 2020 census, DeKalb had a population of 40,290. The population density was 2,353.66 inhabitants per square mile (908.75/km^{2}).

The median age was 27.7 years. 20.4% of residents were under the age of 18 and 11.6% of residents were 65 years of age or older. For every 100 females there were 94.4 males, and for every 100 females age 18 and over there were 92.6 males age 18 and over.

99.3% of residents lived in urban areas, while 0.7% lived in rural areas.

There were 15,259 households and 7,804 families in DeKalb, of which 27.2% had children under the age of 18 living in them. Of all households, 32.9% were married-couple households, 25.0% were households with a male householder and no spouse or partner present, and 33.1% were households with a female householder and no spouse or partner present. About 34.5% of all households were made up of individuals and 8.6% had someone living alone who was 65 years of age or older.

There were 16,629 housing units at an average density of 971.43 per square mile (375.07/km^{2}), of which 8.2% were vacant. The homeowner vacancy rate was 1.9% and the rental vacancy rate was 7.9%.

Racial composition as of the 2020 census
Race	Number	Percent
White	23,663	58.7%
Black or African American	7,444	18.5%
American Indian and Alaska Native	306	0.8%
Asian	1,580	3.9%
Native Hawaiian and Other Pacific Islander	15	0.0%
Some other race	3,221	8.0%
Two or more races	4,061	10.1%

=== Income ===
The median income for a household in the city was $44,223, and the median income for a family was $67,155. Males had a median income of $32,306 versus $17,703 for females. The per capita income for the city was $24,819. About 17.8% of families and 26.4% of the population were below the poverty line, including 34.8% of those under age 18 and 6.6% of those age 65 or over.

=== 2000 census ===
As of the census of 2000, there are 39,018 people, 13,081 households, and 6,566 families residing in the city. The population density is 1,194.7/km^{2} (3,093.9/mi^{2}). There are 13,619 housing units at an average density of 417.0/km^{2} (1,079.9/mi^{2}). The racial makeup of the city is 79.49% White, 9.08% African American, 0.24% Native American, 4.62% Asian, 0.13% Pacific Islander, 4.35% from other races, and 2.09% from two or more races. 9.04% of the population are Hispanic or Latino of any race.

Historical population
Census	Pop.	Note	%±
1880	1,598		—
1890	2,579		61.4%
1900	5,904		128.9%
1910	8,102		37.2%
1920	7,871		−2.9%
1930	8,545		8.6%
1940	9,146		7.0%
1950	11,708		28.0%
1960	18,486		57.9%
1970	32,949		78.2%
1980	33,099		0.5%
1990	34,925		5.5%
2000	39,018		11.7%
2010	43,862		12.4%
2020	40,290		−8.1%
Census Quickfacts

== Economy ==
DeKalb is home to Northern Illinois University, the city's largest employer and Illinois's third-largest campus. Other large employers include Northwestern Medicine, General Electric, Monsanto (originally as DeKalb Corn), the local school district, and a large retail district along Route 23 (shared with Sycamore).

DeKalb is also home to warehouses for several major companies, including Target, 3M, Nestlé, and Ferrara Candy Company, in part due to DeKalb's proximity to major highways such as I-88 and I-39. 3M's complex serves as the distribution hub for three of 3M's four business units and export operations to North America, Europe, Africa, the Middle East and Latin America.

The town was the filming location for the 2012 film At Any Price.

In June, 2020, Meta announced it would construct an $800 million data center on the south side of DeKalb.

== Arts and culture ==
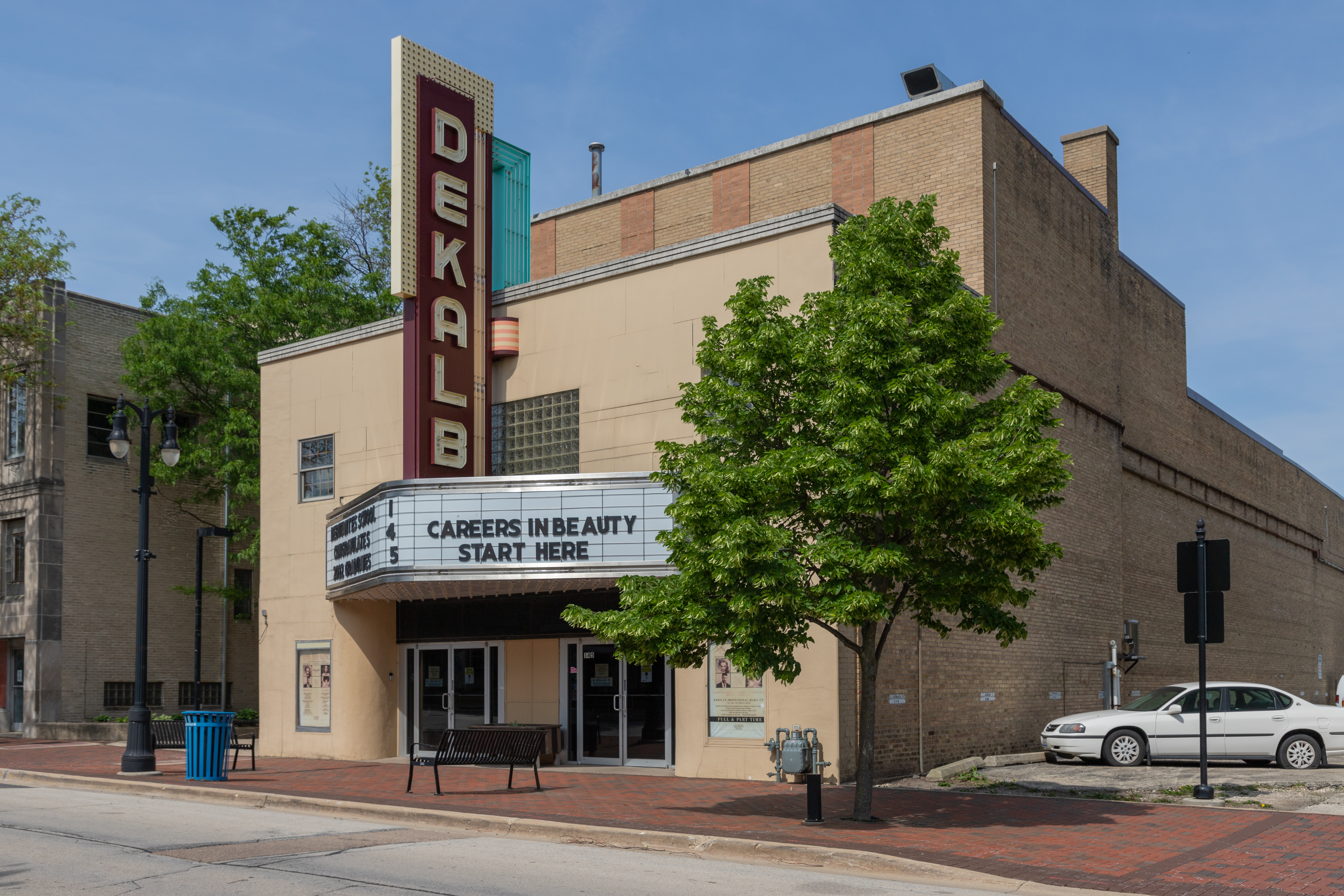
DeKalb Theater

DeKalb is home to the annual Corn Fest, usually held in late August.

The Egyptian Theatre, built in 1929, is one of a handful of such theatres still extant in the United States. The Stage Coach Players, founded in 1947, have a theatre on 5th Street.

== Parks and recreation ==
The DeKalb Park District is responsible for DeKalb's 44 parks and recreation facilities. Members of the League of Women Voters established the park district in 1935 to address the need for a public swimming pool. The City of DeKalb gave the first four parks to the District: Annie's Woods, Huntley Park, Liberty Park, and Hopkins Park.

In 2000 the district opened the Sports and Recreation Center, a multi-function facility that features an indoor field of over 1 acre, clear-span space with synthetic field turf. The park district provides year-round athletic and recreation programs including day camps, youth baseball and softball, adult softball leagues both indoors and outdoors, swimming lessons, golf lessons, karate, tennis, adult and youth basketball leagues, indoor soccer, fitness classes, and preschool.

The DeKalb Park District park system has 44 parks totaling over 700 acres: community parks, neighborhood parks, passive parks and linear parks. Notable parks and facilities include:

- River Heights Golf Course
- Buena Vista Golf Course
- Hopkins Park Pool and Community Center
- Nehring Center for Culture and Tourism
- Ellwood House Museum and Park

== Government ==
DeKalb has a council-manager government. Policy is developed by an elected city council and implemented by an appointed professional city manager. The DeKalb City Council is made up of a mayor, elected at-large, and seven alderpersons, elected by ward. Each serves a four-year term, with half the council elected every two years. Mayor Cohen Barnes is the current mayor and is in his second term. A city clerk is also elected every four years to serve as the city's official recordkeeper. City council meetings are held the second and fourth Mondays of every month.

The DeKalb Police Department is the primary law enforcement agency in DeKalb. It was founded in 1885 and has 65 sworn officers. The current chief of police is David Byrd.

== Education ==
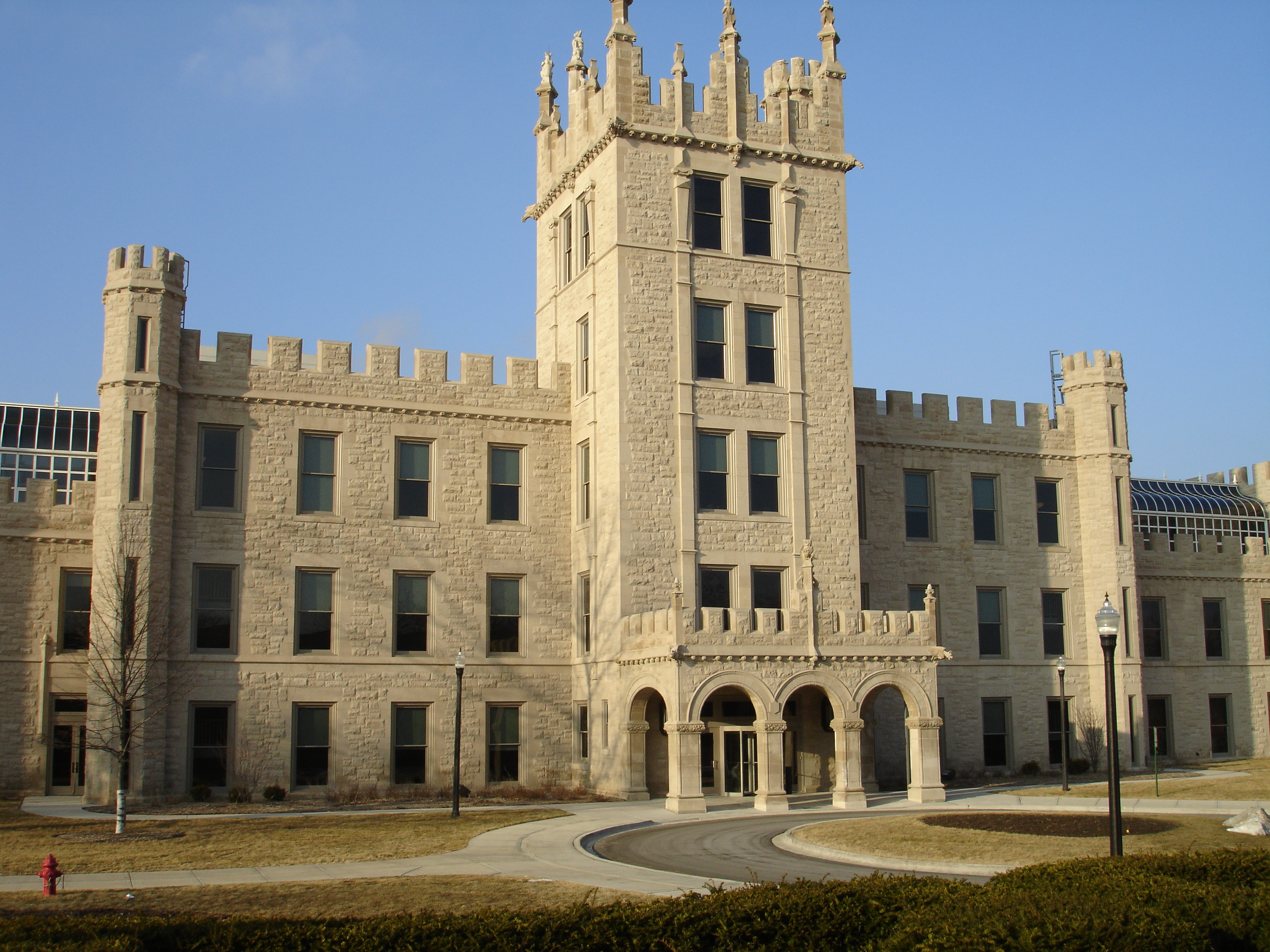
Altgeld Hall is the oldest building on the campus of Northern Illinois University.

There are 11 public schools, one private school, one university and one public library.

=== Primary and secondary ===
DeKalb is served by both public and private school systems. DeKalb Community Unit School District 428 operates eight elementary schools (Grades K–5), Clinton Rosette and Huntley Middle Schools (Grades 6–8), and DeKalb High School (Grades 9–12), which is the home of the Barbs.

=== Colleges and universities ===
Northern Illinois University (NIU) was founded in DeKalb as the Northern Illinois State Normal School in 1895. NIU is a comprehensive teaching and research institution with total enrollment around 20,000, which makes NIU the third largest campus in Illinois.

== Transportation ==
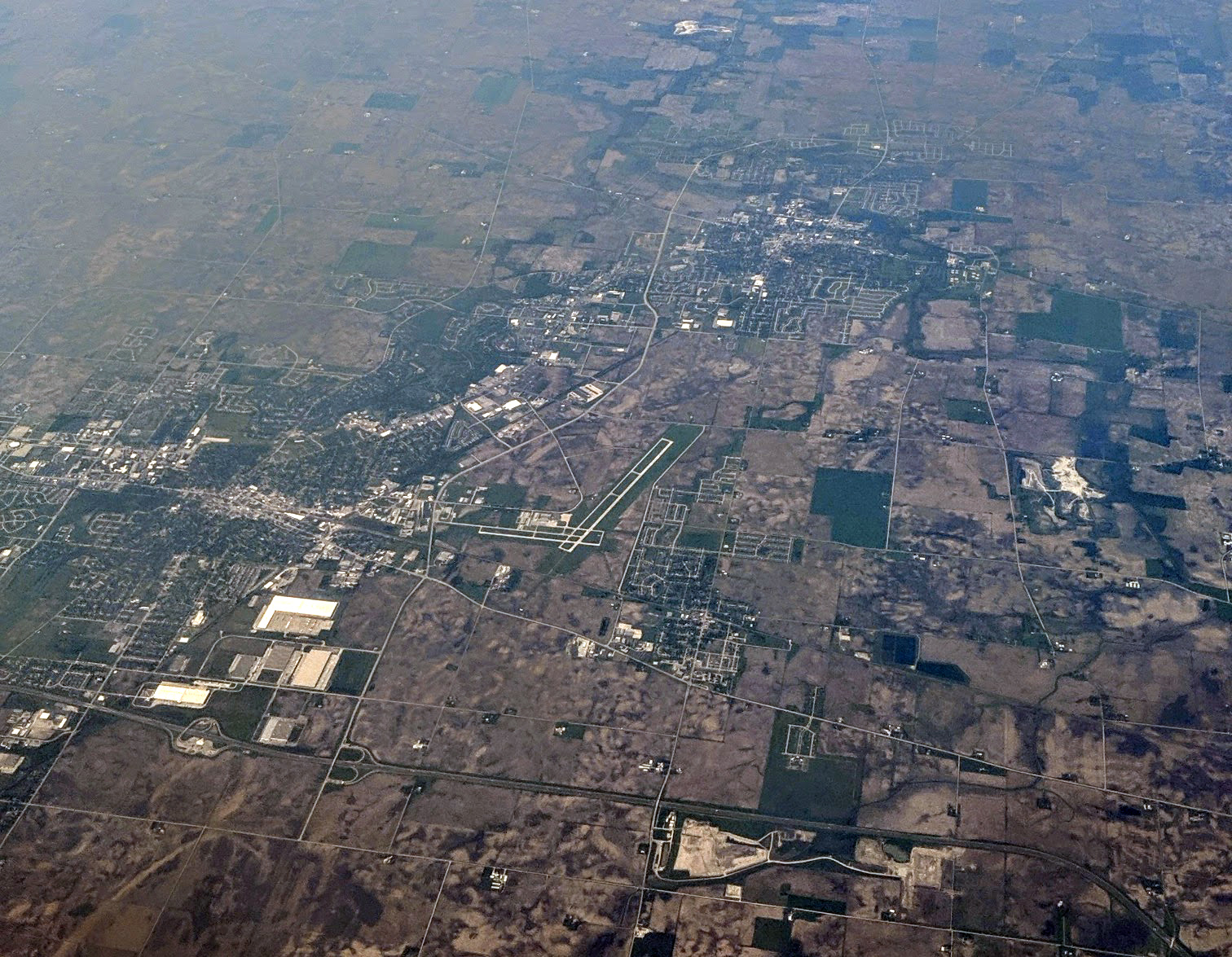
Aerial view of DeKalb, with airport (center)

=== Railway ===
The first railroad entered DeKalb on August 22, 1853. In 1864, the line became part of the Chicago and North Western Railway main line from Chicago to Omaha, which carried passengers until 1971. A depot between 6th and 7th Streets was built in 1891. The Union Pacific Railroad took control of the line in 1995. Since 2006, the nearest passenger rail service is at the Metra commuter system station in Elburn, 15 miles (24 km) east of DeKalb, which is accessible by bus. In January 2023, the Dekalb City Council voted to fund a transportation study aimed at determining feasibility of extending Metra Union Pacific West Line commuter rail service from Elburn to the city. In May 2023, the initial key facts of the feasibility study were published, which showed that an extension to Dekalb was feasible based on commuter and daily ridership estimates. In 2024, Dekalb backed a regional feasibility study by federal officials to revive Amtrak service that ran as the Twin Cities Zephyr, the service was discontinued in the 1970s.

=== Road ===
The transcontinental Lincoln Highway was established through DeKalb in 1913. The first "seedling mile" of concrete pavement was built in 1914 at Malta, six miles west of DeKalb. The rest of Lincoln Highway across DeKalb County was paved in 1920. The highway is now part of Illinois Route 38. The main north–south highway through DeKalb is Illinois Route 23, which forms an unusual intersection of two state highways and a major railroad at the corner of Fourth and Lincoln. Interstate Highway 88, part of the Illinois Tollway system, was completed to DeKalb in the 1970s and passes just south of town, where there are two toll plazas and a service oasis that includes restaurants and a gas station. Via the tollway, DeKalb is 30 miles (48 km) west of Aurora and 65 miles (105 km) west of downtown Chicago.

=== Bus ===
Scheduled local bus service throughout the DeKalb area is provided by DeKalb Public Transit, a joint effort by the city in partnership with Northern Illinois University. Routes extend through the university, the city, and Sycamore with extensions west to Kishwaukee College and east to the passenger rail station at Elburn. Schedules on the main routes vary depending on whether the university is in session. The system began in 1971 as the Huskie Bus Line under contract to the NIU Student Association. By 1982 the system served 3 million riders per year, second only in Illinois to the Chicago Transit Authority. In 2018, it merged with a smaller City of DeKalb bus system, which had been operated by the local Voluntary Action Center (VAC). Paratransit operations were added in 2021, also by transfer from VAC. VAC continues to serve a wider surrounding area with on-demand transportation for people with special needs and to out-of-town medical appointments.

=== Airport ===
DeKalb Taylor Municipal Airport (DTMA) (ICAO: KDKB, FAA LID: DKB), serving the general aviation community, is on the east side of the city at 3232 Pleasant Street. The airport opened in 1944 in association with a factory making Interstate TDR assault drone aircraft. The city took ownership in 1948. There is no commercial service directly to DeKalb, but the city center is 43 miles from O'Hare International Airport in Chicago, making commercial air access relatively easy.

== Notable people ==
- George Franklin Barber, architect; born in DeKalb
- A. J. Bramlett, basketball player for the Cleveland Cavaliers from 1999 to 2000
- Dennis J. Collins, Illinois lawyer and state legislator
- Cindy Crawford, model and actress; born and raised in DeKalb
- Joseph B. Ebbesen, Illinois state legislator
- Isaac L. Ellwood, rancher, businessman and barbed wire entrepreneur
- Philip Ewell, American professor of music theory
- Fred Eychaner, media mogul and philanthropist; raised in DeKalb
- Joseph Glidden, farmer who patented barbed wire in 1874
- Jacob Haish, one of the inventors of barbed wire
- Barbara Hale, Emmy Award-winning co-star of the Perry Mason television series
- Mike Heimerdinger, assistant coach for several NFL teams; born and raised in DeKalb
- Richard Jenkins, Academy Award-nominated and Emmy Award-winning actor; born and raised in DeKalb
- Mel Kenyon, racing driver and 2003 Motorsports Hall of Fame of America inductee
- Alan and Dale Klapmeier, co-founders of the Cirrus Design Corporation and 2014 National Aviation Hall of Fame inductees
- Doug Mallory, former coach of the Atlanta Falcons from 2017 to 2020
- Karl Nelson, offensive tackle for the New York Giants from 1983 to 1988
- Mel Owens, linebacker for the Los Angeles Rams from 1981 to 1989
- Richard Powers, National Book Award and Pulitzer Prize-winning author of The Echo Maker and The Overstory respectively
- Hellah Sidibe, former professional soccer player
- Jeffrey Trail, U.S. Navy lieutenant and murder victim; born in DeKalb
- Weekend Nachos, powerviolence punk band; formed in DeKalb
- Sue Vicory, writer, film producer and filmmaker
- W. Willard Wirtz, United States Secretary of Labor from 1962 to 1969; born and raised in DeKalb

== See also ==
- Haish Memorial Library
- Kishwaukee River
- Northern Illinois University
- Northern Illinois University shooting
