= Joseph F. Glidden House =

Historic house in Illinois, United States

- U.S. National Register of Historic Places
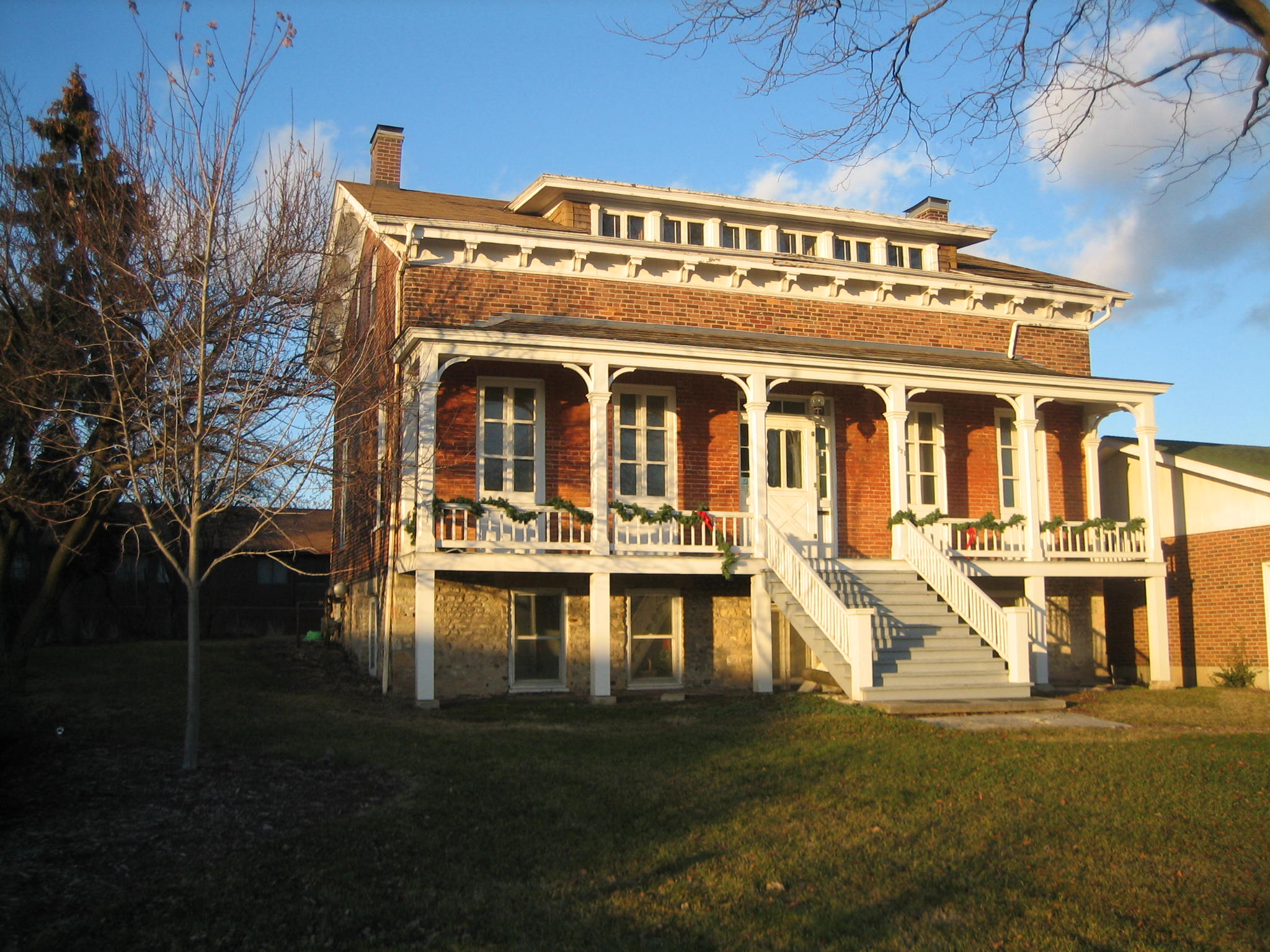
- The home of the most famous barbed wire inventor, Joseph F. Glidden.

- Location within Illinois Location within the United States
- Interactive map showing the location of Joseph F. Glidden House
- Location: DeKalb, Illinois, United States
- Coordinates: 41°55′53″N 88°46′13″W
- Area: less than one acre
- Built: 1861; 165 years ago
- Architect: Jacob Haish
- Architectural style: French Colonial
- NRHP reference No.: 73002159
- Added to NRHP: October 25, 1973

The Joseph F. Glidden Homestead is located in DeKalb, a city in DeKalb County, Illinois, United States. It was the home to the famed inventor of barbed wire Joseph Glidden. The barn, still located on the property near several commercial buildings, is said to be where Glidden perfected his improved version of barbed wire which would eventually transform him into a successful entrepreneur. The Glidden House was added to the National Register of Historic Places in 1973. The home was designed by another barbed wire patent holder in DeKalb, Jacob Haish.

The property contains the house and two outbuildings; the barn and the remains of an old millhouse, which has been repurposed into a living-history blacksmith shop. Constructed in 1861, the Glidden House adheres mostly to a French Colonial style of architecture. The raised basement and full-length porch are two of the architectural elements found on the Glidden House that are consistently found in French Colonial homes. The barn, a building of high historical significance, was not included as part of the National Register listing for the property until 2002, nearly 30 years after the original nomination was approved.

== House ==
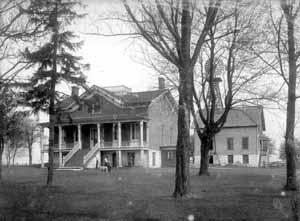
The Glidden House as it looked around 1900.

The land that the Glidden Homestead stands on is what remains of Joseph Glidden's once large DeKalb County farm. His holdings stretched along Lincoln Highway, both the north and south sides, from the Kishwaukee River in the east to present-day Annie Glidden Road on the west. The Glidden Farm went as far north as today's Lucinda Avenue. The farm's south border, near where Glidden would grant the Galena and Chicago Union Railroad right-of-way through DeKalb in the early 1890s was near present-day Taylor Street.

The two-story Joseph F. Glidden house is constructed from locally fired brick, which is relatively soft. The softness of the brick has caused it to weather in a non-uniform fashion. The brick is said to have been fired at a small brickyard which once existed on the Kishwaukee River in DeKalb, near the present-day Lincoln Highway bridge. The home stands on a stone foundation and was designed by local carpenter and eventual barbed wire competitor to Glidden, Jacob Haish. Construction was completed in 1861 and the home is a prominent example of Illinois French Colonial architecture.

=== History ===
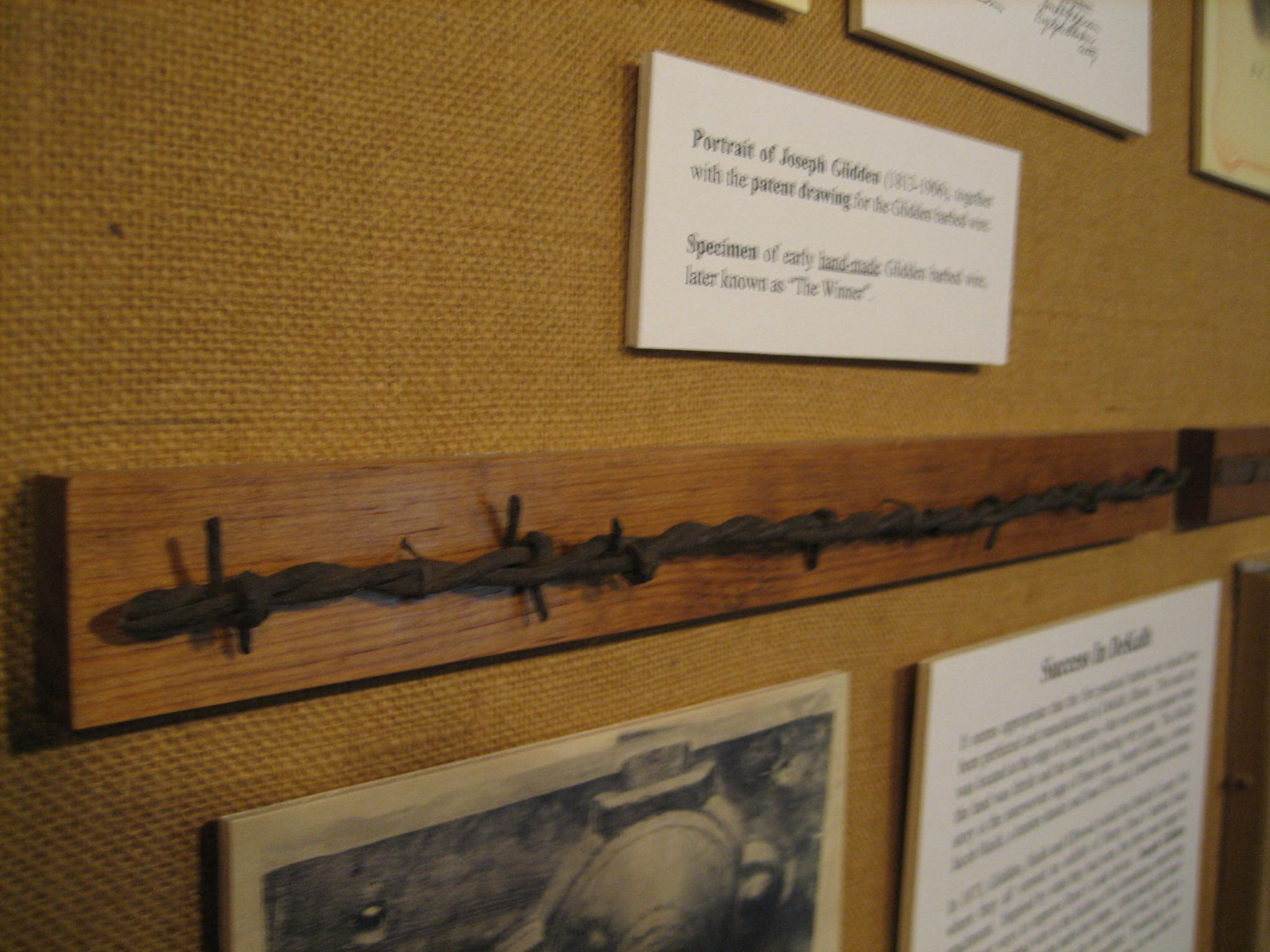
An early handmade specimen of Glidden's "The Winner" on display at the Barbed Wire History Museum in DeKalb, Illinois.

The land where the Glidden Homestead stands once held a log structure, which Glidden lived in when he first came to DeKalb at the beckoning of his cousin Russell Huntley. The house was built in 1861 for barbed wire entrepreneur Joseph Farwell Glidden. As his personal residence, the house, and its accompanying barn, were closely associated with his invention, really just an improvement, of barbed wire. Glidden's improvement upon a wire board fence developed by Henry Rose was of vast importance in the settlement of the United States west of the Mississippi. It was after Glidden saw Rose exhibit his wire at a fair in 1873 that he was struck with the idea of attaching barbs to wire strand fencing. Glidden is said to have experimented with some of his ideas in the basement kitchen of the Glidden House. He noticed that whenever he tried to attach barbs directly to strands of wire they slid along the length of the wire; Glidden realized he needed a way to crimp the barbs. He began tinkering around the home's kitchen. Glidden fit two hair pins to the shaft of a coffee mill, one centered and the other off-center. He found that by placing the wire between the pins and turning the crank a uniform barb resulted. How to crimp the barbs to the wire was solved, in the barn, by tying one end of the wire and another length of wire to a poplar tree on the grounds of the Glidden House and the other ends of the wires to a grindstone. The grindstone was used to twist the wires together and prevent the barbs from slipping.

Day-to-day life at the Glidden House was mostly carried out in the home's basement which contained a full kitchen, dining room, and living room. The upper floors were used for guests and for sleeping quarters. In 1877 Glidden's daughter, Elva, married William H. Bush in the homestead.

As of 2006 extensive restoration work had been completed on the home. The front porch was repaired and restored and inside, the hardwood floors have been replaced and refinished. In addition, the front parlors have been repainted and restored.

=== Architecture ===
The home was mostly designed in a French Colonial style, though it contains some elements of Greek Revival architecture. French Colonial architecture was more popular in the American South than it ever was in the northern tier of states.

==== Exterior ====
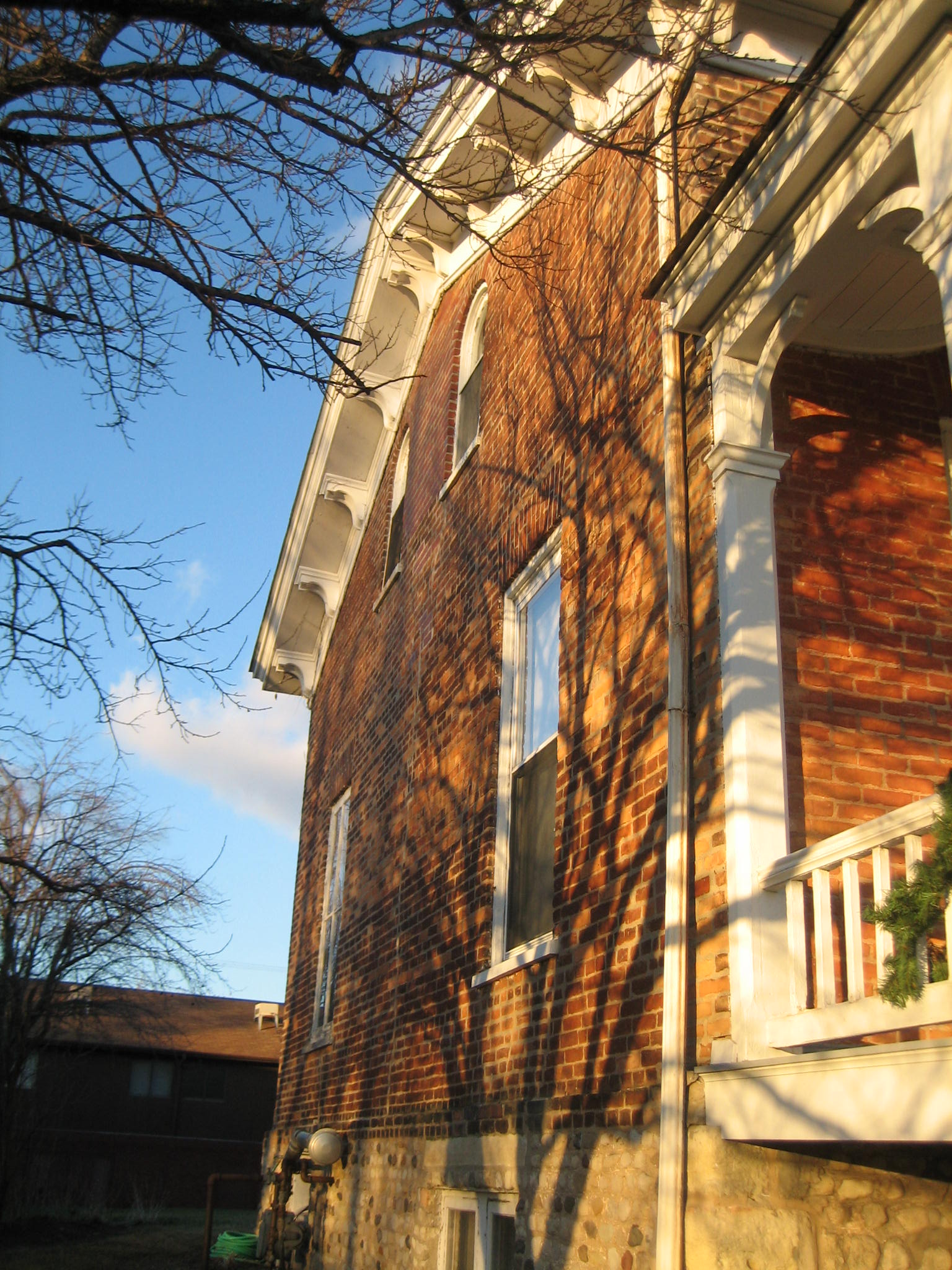
The west facade of the house, note the cornice.

The two-story brick structure is supported by a fieldstone foundation and still features its original front porch. The porch spans the length of the building's front (south) facade, at a height of about 6 ft (2 m). The porch is supported by four wooden pillars, which rest on stone bases. The stairs leading to the front porch are supported by two similar wooden posts, which, like the house, are set into fieldstone bases. The first step on the stairs was originally a limestone block embedded in the ground. The porch roof is supported by six wooden, bracketed pillars. The pillars are simple, with the brackets coming from the boxed capitals. At the rear of the porch wooden pilasters set at each end help to support the roof. Differentiating the home from the traditional French Colonial design is the porch roof, which is separate from the main roof.

The house stands mostly as it did in 1861 save a few alterations. The front porch was screened in at the time the building was added to the National Register of Historic Places, the screens have since been removed. At the rear of the house a small porch was enclosed. In 1909 or 1910 there were major subtractions and replacements. Removed were a cast-iron widow's walk along the roof ridge and a large gable dormer, decorated in the same manner as the cornice decorating the roof trim. The present dormer replaced the larger one and is more of a low-shed type.

The roof itself is a low gable and dominated by single stack, straddle ridge chimneys at its east and west ends. The boxed roof trim is a decorated cornice. The low-shed dormer is covered with green asphalt. The old widow's walk, which a neighbor dubbed Glidden's "obscuratory", was balustraded and set just above the dormer.

==== Interior ====
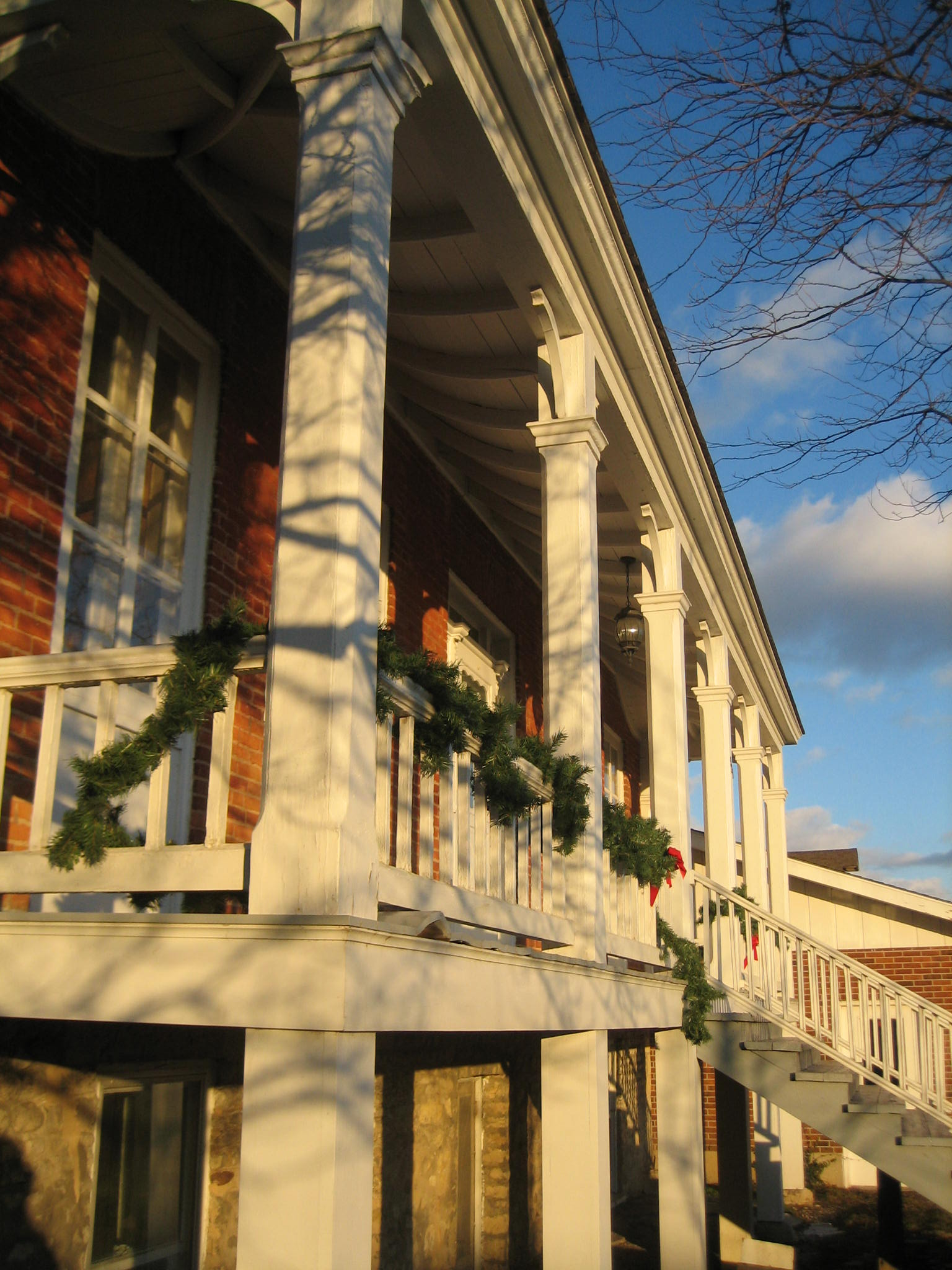
The distinctive porch is an 1861 original.

The interior of the building is also similar to how it appeared when the house was constructed. However, a few changes have been made. In 1910 the two marble fireplaces were replaced by brick. The flooring has been replaced as needed. The home's basement, once the main living area, has since been converted several times for other uses.

On the first floor of the home the rooms remain much the same as they were when Glidden lived in the house. An original multi-paneled wooden door remains at the entry from the porch to the central hall. The door, however, was altered, having glass panels installed to admit more light. The staircase is also original and its newel posts resemble those found in the Isaac and Harriet Ellwood House, another Haish designed home, and the Gurler House, whose architect is unknown though it was quite possibly Haish, both in DeKalb.

On the house's east side are three rooms, whose original presence is open to debate. The three rooms are interconnected, another common French colonial element. The room adjacent the porch was used as the Glidden's dining room and is where the large brick fireplace, which replaced the marble one in 1909, is located. The 1909 fireplace is of the American Craftsman style. At the end of the hall, near the kitchen, there is a full bathroom.

The western part of the first floor is dominated by a large formal living room. The room has two entrances, one at the front of the hall, near the front door and the other at the back end of the hall. This was the room in which Elva Glidden married in the late 19th century. After 1941 the rear part of the living room, or "west" room, was walled off and a second kitchen added. When Jessie Glidden, the last Glidden to occupy the old homestead, moved in 1998, the west room was restored to its original size and the second kitchen removed.

The basement, and for part of the home's history, the main living area, is accessed via a staircase at the back of the first-floor hall. The steep stairs still show years of wear. One of the rooms off the main basement is the kitchen where Glidden is said to have experimented with the coffee grinder and his wife's hair pins, eventually leading to his brand of barbed wire.

The second-floor served as the main sleeping quarters. It consists of a few simple bedrooms, all historically without closets. The upstairs hall contains a door which once accessed a staircase to the widow's walk, what remains of the space has been used as a closet for over a century.

== Outbuildings ==
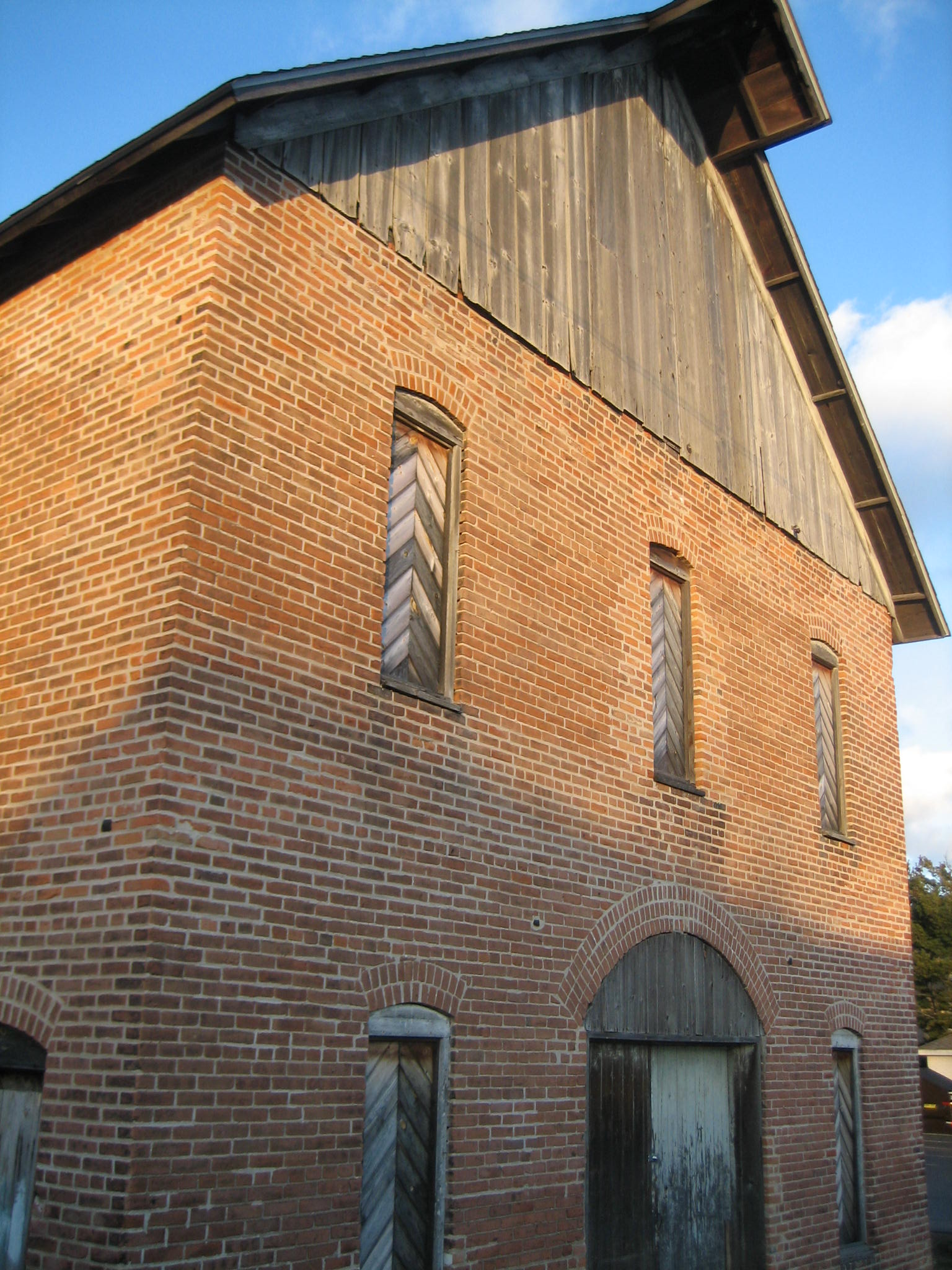
The Glidden Barn, added to the Register in 2002, where Glidden's famed barbed wire was invented.

The property has two remaining outbuildings. The barn is where Glidden invented his famous improvement on barbed wire. Dubbed "The Winner", his barbed wire became the most popular version of the invention. Barbed wire is considered to be one of the most important factors in American progress and settlement.

The other outbuilding on the property along historic Lincoln Highway are the remnants of a once dominating windmill. Though only the foundation remains, it gives a glimpse of how impressive the structure must have once been.

=== Barn ===
The Glidden Barn, located to the rear and east of the home, was thought to have been added to the National Register of Historic Places when the original nomination for the house was approved in 1973. However, in the late 1990s, the Illinois Historic Preservation Agency revealed that the nomination included only the house. The Glidden Historical Center initiated the process of adding the barn to the Register. Those moves were approved by the Illinois Historic Sites Advisory Council in 2002 and the barn officially became part of the National Register.

The barn was built sometime around 1871, possibly even before, and is constructed of the same soft brick that makes up the exterior of the home. Tradition in the Glidden family holds that the barn, like the house itself, was designed and built by prominent local carpenter Jacob Haish. The famous barn, one of DeKalb County's oldest remaining, stands a full two-stories high, measuring around 50 feet (15 m) tall, with a width of 30 feet (9 m).

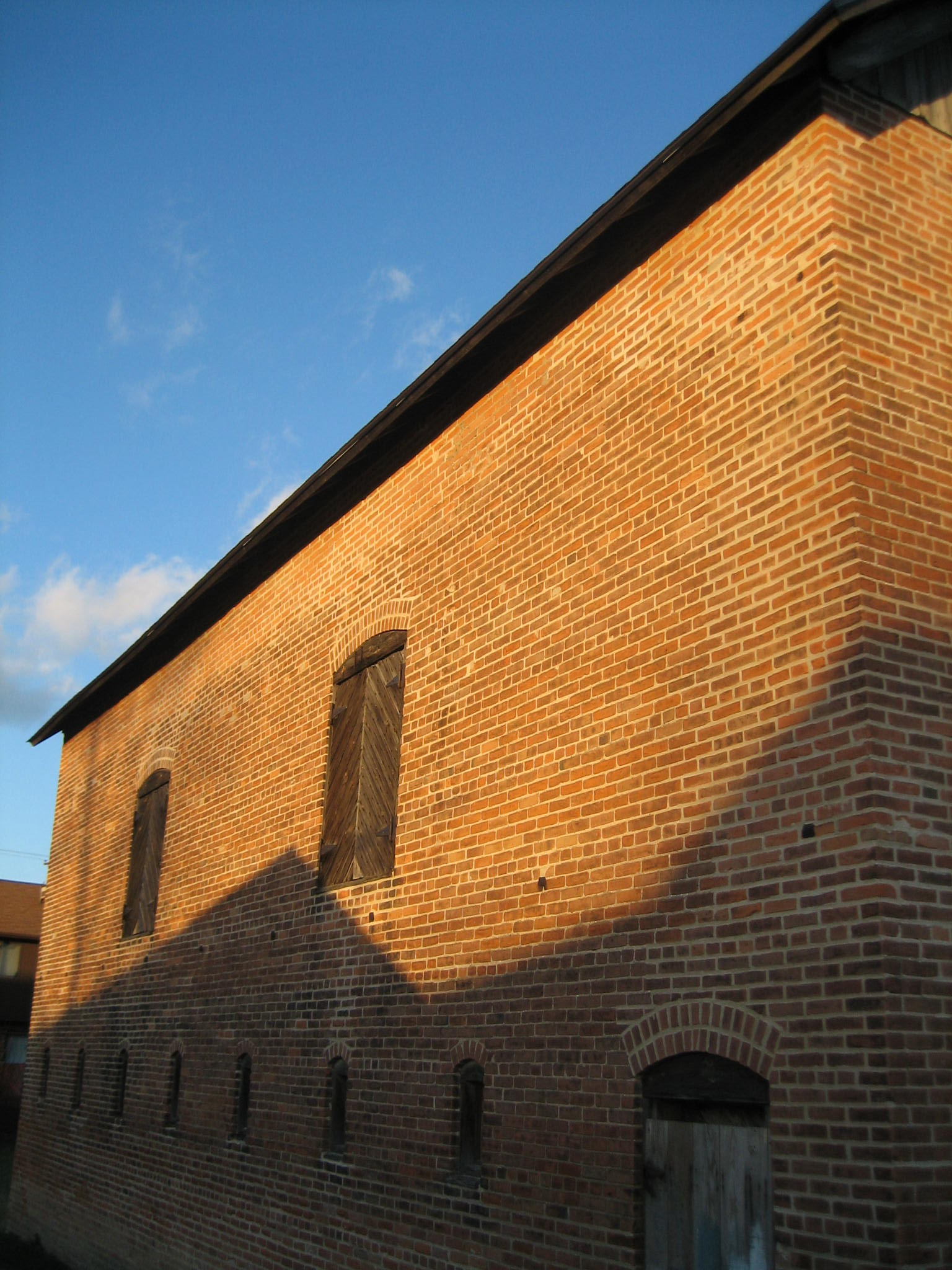
The small, single-pane windows are visible in the shadows.

In February 2007 the Glidden Homestead and Historical Center kicked off a fundraising drive. The drive is aimed at raising US$2 million to expand the Joseph F. Glidden House site to include museum space and a media center. Some of the funds will be used to help restore the barn and expand historical center museum space into the building.

==== Architecture ====
The Glidden barn is of pole and beam construction. The second-floor interior is dominated by two large transverse wooden beams. It is of the three-bay, English tradition, the west bay containing a space for a stairwell leading to a hayloft and seven stalls. It is constructed of red brick and stands on a foundation of limestone. Glidden's barn took full advantage of the term vernacular; the brick was locally manufactured and the limestone locally quarried.

The east bay of the barn contains an animal stall in its northeast corner and a fully enclosed office in its opposite corner. The second-floor hayloft is supported by the two massive transverse beams. The full-sized loft is accessible via an enclosed staircase against the south wall. The building's exterior roof is fully supported by the brick walls. The result is a loft which is an entirely open space save for some pole and beam construction supporting the laminated beams, which act as tie rods at the base of the roof. The barn roof is a common gable roof pitched at a 45 degree angle, it was originally covered with wooden shingles, those have been replaced over the years with asphalt.

The barn features extensive windows, somewhat unusual outside of dairy barns, with a total of 14 eight-paned, double-hung windows dispersed over three sides of the rectangular structure, north, south and east. On the west side, facing the house, are seven smaller single-pane windows. The double-hung windows are topped with segmented arches constructed from a double row of bricks; the north and south main entrances are also topped with segmented brick arches, each of three rows of bricks.

=== Windmill building ===
Only the foundation remains of the property's windmill. What is left, ten rows of stone above the ground, is completely invisible when the home is viewed by passers-by on Lincoln Highway. The windmill started to fall into disrepair around the 1930s or 40s. The original, specific use of the windmill is unknown.

== See also ==
- Isaac Ellwood
- List of Registered Historic Places in Illinois
