= Voluntary Action Center =

Voluntary Action Center (VAC) is an American local non-profit organization based in DeKalb County, Illinois that seeks to help people meet their basic transportation and nutrition needs through the efforts of volunteers. VAC was incorporated in 1974 and provides services in DeKalb, Bureau, LaSalle, Kendall, and Putnam Counties.
