= Joseph Glidden =

American inventor (1813–1906)

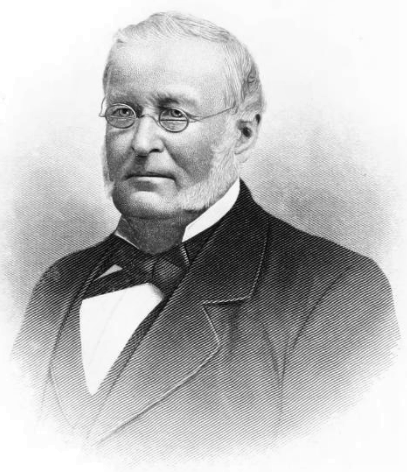
- Born: January 18, 1813; Charlestown, New Hampshire, U.S.
- Died: October 9, 1906 (aged 93); DeKalb, Illinois, U.S.
- Resting place: Fairview Cemetery, DeKalb, Illinois
- Occupations: Teacher, farmer, inventor, businessman
- Spouse: Clarissa Foster (1837–1843) Lucinda Warne (1850–1895)
- Children: 3

Signature
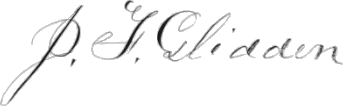

Joseph Farwell Glidden (January 18, 1813 – October 9, 1906) was an American businessman and farmer. He was the inventor of the modern barbed wire. In 1874, he donated land for the Northern Illinois State Normal School in DeKalb, Illinois, which was renamed as Northern Illinois University in 1957.

== Early life ==
Glidden was born in Charlestown, New Hampshire, of English descent. His family later moved to Clarendon, New York. Glidden was a teacher there for about 8 years, during which years he married Clarissa Foster in 1837. In 1843, he moved to Illinois with his wife and children, first to Ogle County and then to DeKalb where they had purchased a farm. His wife died in 1846, in childbirth of their daughter in Ogle County, Illinois. Their three children, including the infant daughter Clara (Clarissa) died in an epidemic in 1847. Their two sons died after the move. Glidden married Lucinda Warne in 1851, with whom he had one daughter, Elva Frances.

== Invention and patent for barbed wire ==
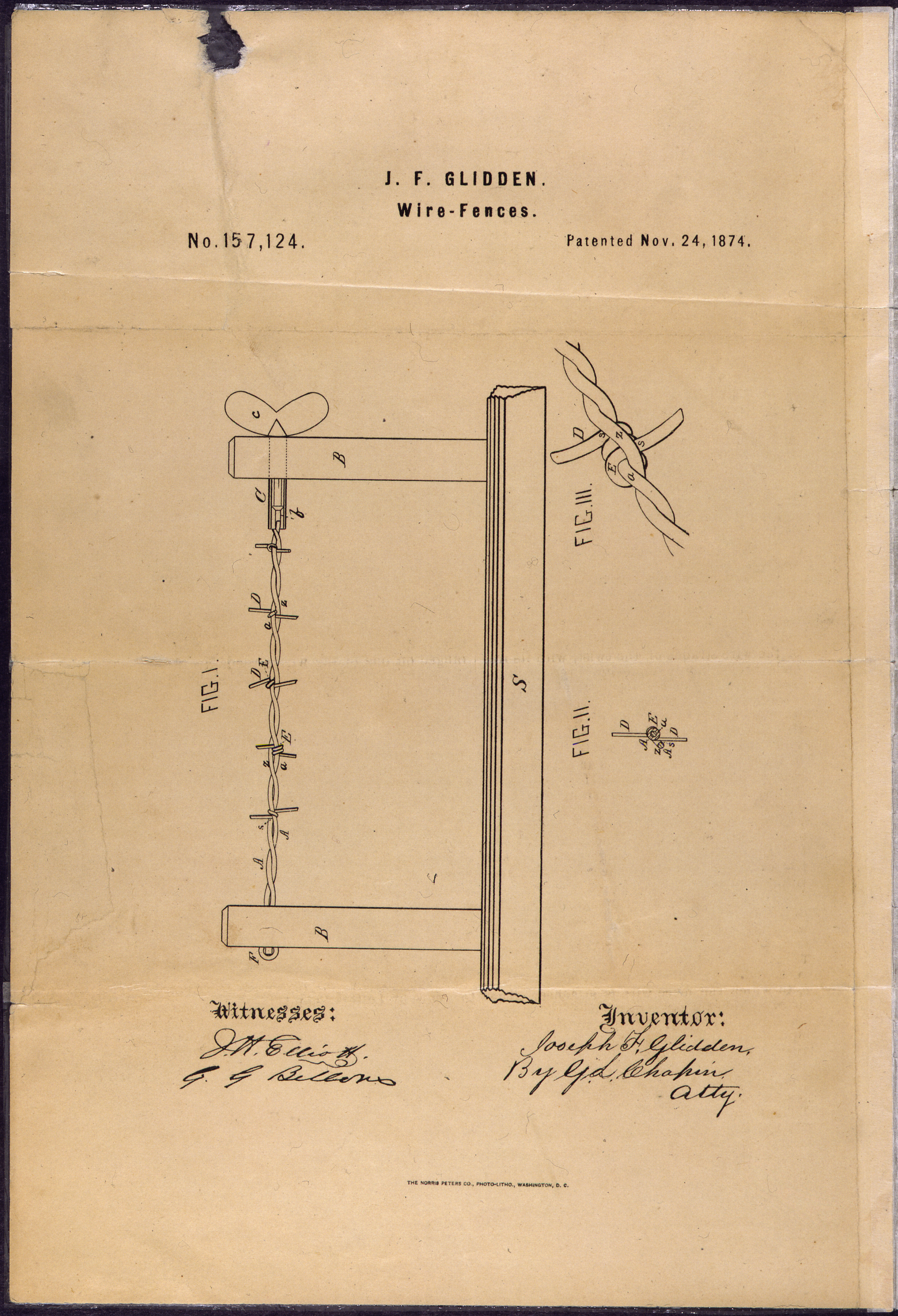
Patent drawing for Joseph F. Glidden's Improvement to barbed wire

Glidden began work on ways to make a useful barbed wire to fence cattle in 1873. He made his best design of barbed wire by using a coffee mill to create the barbs. Glidden placed the barbs along a wire and then twisted another wire around it to keep the barbs in place, in a design that he called "The Winner", being his best design. He received the patent for that barbed wire design on November 24, 1874, when he was 61 years old. He and local hardware dealer Isaac L. Ellwood began manufacturing and selling the barbed wire with his patent, as the Barb Fence Company in DeKalb, Illinois. In 1876, Glidden exited the manufacturing aspect, though retaining royalties, by selling his half of the manufacturing business to Washburn and Moen, who had a wire manufacturing plant in Worcester, Massachusetts and from whom Glidden and Ellwood had been purchasing steel wire. Ellwood stayed in DeKalb and renamed the company I. L. Ellwood & Company of DeKalb. That company evolved into American Steel and Wire, and eventually was bought by U. S. Steel Manufacturing Company.

Glidden was embroiled in a legal battle initiated by fellow DeKalb resident Jacob Haish over whether the design for holding the barbs in place with an extra strand of wire was novel, an improved design. An earlier patent for barbed wire had been issued to a man in Ohio, among other patents related to barbed wire. Glidden eventually won at the US Supreme Court in an 1892 case, his patent protection expired the same year. The legal fees were estimated to have cost Glidden $100,000.

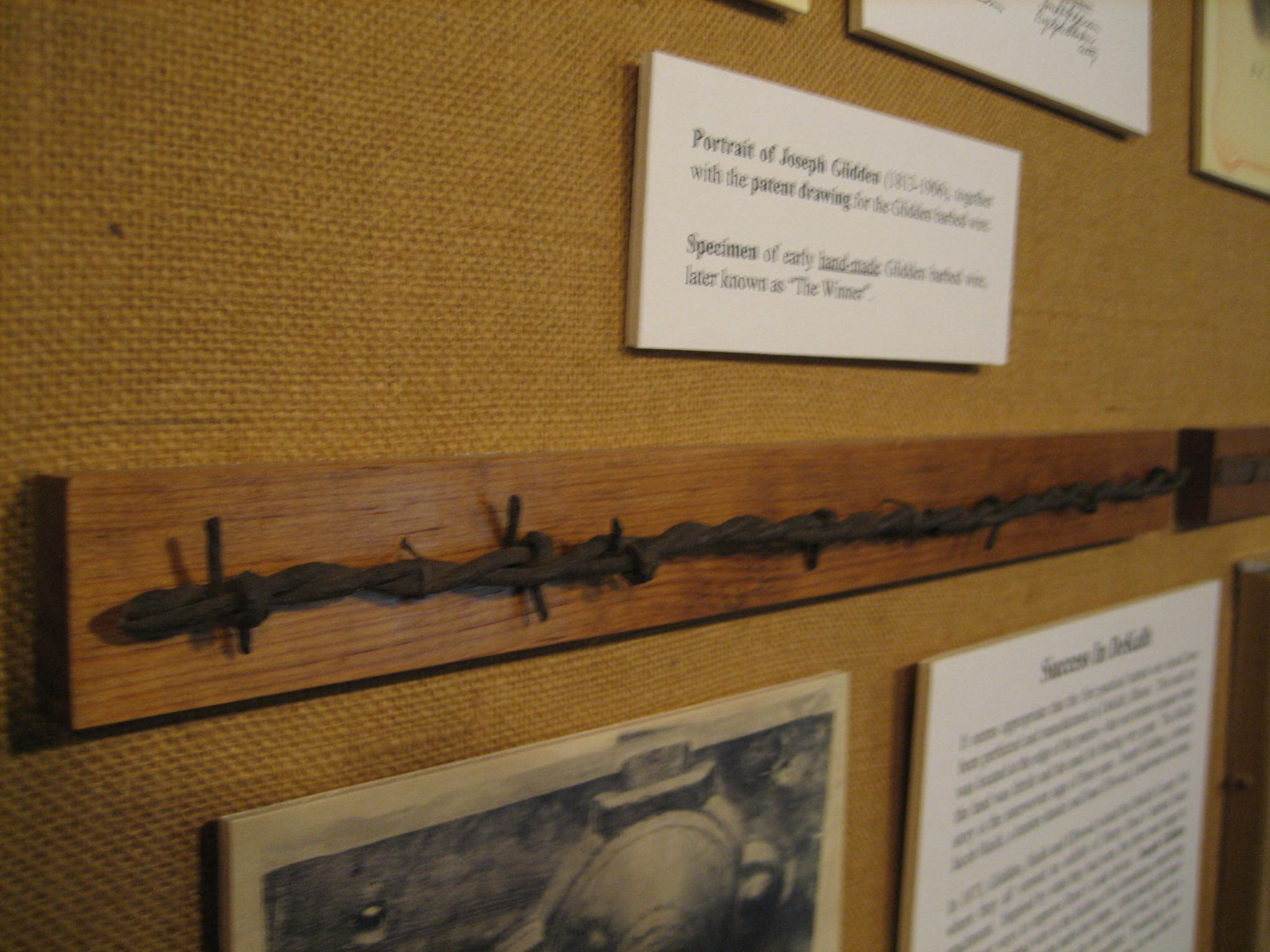
An early handmade specimen of Glidden's "The Winner" on display in the "Fencing Frontiers" exhibit at the Ellwood House Museum in DeKalb, Illinois

This invention made him extremely rich. It was estimated that Glidden earned $1,000,000 in royalties until his patent expired in 1892. Companies manufacturing the barbed wire under his license ranged from New York state to Kansas by 1884. At the time of his death in 1906, he was a wealthy man. The Dun & Bradstreet Collection, 1840–1895, MSS 791, LXIII, 130, Baker Library, Harvard, recorded his assets at one million dollars. This included the Glidden House Hotel; the DeKalb Chronicle; 3,000 acres (12 km^{2}) of farmland in Illinois; 35,000 acres (1,360 km^{2}) in Texas; and the Glidden Felt Pad Industry.

=== Local political activity and other businesses ===
From 1852 to 1854, he served as sheriff of DeKalb County. In 1851, 1861, 1862, 1869, 1870, 1871, 1872, and 1876 he served on the county's board of supervisors. In 1867, he served on the executive committee of DeKalb County Agriculture and Mechanical Society's Seventh Annual Fall Fair, held September 25–28. In 1876, he was the Democratic nominee for Illinois State Senator. From 1861 to 1874, he served as a member of the board of school directors, and for 20 years paid the largest school tax of any citizen of the county. He was also one of the largest contributors to the erection of one of the churches. He was also vice-president of the DeKalb National Bank, director of the North Western Railroad, and owner of the DeKalb Rolling Mill.

=== Demonstration of use in Texas changes ranching ===
To demonstrate the effectiveness of barbed wire, Glidden and his sales agent for the State of Texas, Marques Fortner, in 1881 developed the "Frying Pan Ranch" in Bushland in Potter County near Amarillo, Texas. The wire was brought in by wagon from the railhead at Dodge City, Kansas, and the timbers were cut from Palo Duro Canyon and along the Canadian River Valley. A herd of 12,000 head of cattle was branded with the "Panhandle Brand", which the cowboys called " frying pan". The ranch proved the success of the wire and changed ranching.

Henry B. Sanborn, a sales representative for Glidden's company, owned a ranch in Grayson County north of Dallas and wished to advertise barbed wire there. In 1881, Sanborn purchased ninety-five sections of land in southwestern Potter County from near the Canadian River extending into Randall County south of Amarillo. Included in the purchase was Tecovas Spring, once a watering site and a trading post for Indians and Comancheros. John Summerfield, a surveyor from Sherman, Texas, reported a constant flow of freshwater from the spring. Sanborn chose this site for his ranch headquarters and enclosed 120 miles of land in barbed wire for $39,000 ($1.3 million in 2025 dollars). Warren W. Wetzel, also of Sherman, used cedar posts brought from both the Palo Duro Canyon and the breaks of the Sierrita de la Cruz in the northwestern portion of the ranch to hold up the wire.

Besides ranchers, railroads were large purchasers of barbed wire, so that cattle did not stray onto their tracks.

The Frying Pan Ranch soon had 15,000 head of cattle, and 125,000 more acres were added. Later the ranch was divided. In 1898, Glidden deeded Frying Pan Ranch to his son-in-law William Henry Bush. Between 1908 and 1920, William Henry Bush and his second wife Ruth Bush built a larger ranch house near Tecovas Spring, which later became the residence of Stanley Marsh 3 and his wife, Wendy. Gwendolyn "Wendy" Bush O'Brien was the daughter of Emeline Bush and her husband Frank O'Brien; Emeline was a daughter of William Henry and Ruth Bush. Stanley Marsh called the estate "Toad Hall".

== Land for the Northern Illinois State Normal School ==
Glidden, a former teacher, gave 63 acres (255,000 m^{2}) of his homestead as a site for the Northern Illinois State Normal School. The school opened on September 12, 1898, with 139 students and 16 members of the faculty. The school's name was changed to Northern Illinois University in 1957.

The town of Glidden, Iowa, is named in his honor. Along with Rowen Glidden a relative that now resides in Seattle, Washington.

== Personal life ==
He and his wife Lucinda had one daughter, Elva Frances, in 1851. She married William Henry Bush in DeKalb on February 1, 1877. His wife Lucinda died on October 28, 1895. Elva died in 1906 not long before her father died, and is buried in the Glidden family plot in a cemetery in DeKalb.

In 1898, Glidden deeded his Frying Pan ranch in Texas to his son-in-law, W. H. Bush. Bush married again in 1908, after being widowed, to Ruth Russell Gentry. He is buried in Graceland Cemetery in Chicago.

== In popular culture ==
The "barbed wire salesman" in Back to the Future Part III is either based on Joseph F. Glidden or John Warne Gates who was a pioneer promoter of barbed wire. He is played by Richard Dysart.

== See also ==
- Joseph F. Glidden House
- The Barbed Wire Patent

== Patents ==
- U.S. patent 157,124 – Wire fences
