= Jacob Haish =

German-born American inventor

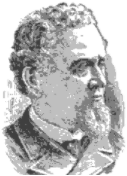
- Born: March 9, 1826; Grand Duchy of Baden
- Died: February 19, 1926 (aged 99); DeKalb, Illinois
- Occupations: Carpenter, architect
- Spouse: Sophie Ann Brown (m. 1847)

Jacob Haish (March 9, 1826 – February 19, 1926) was one of the first inventors of barbed wire. His type of barbed wire was in direct competition with the other barbed wire manufacturers in DeKalb, Illinois. He was a known carpenter and architect in DeKalb County and designed several prominent DeKalb homes.

== Early life ==
Haish was born in Baden, Germany on March 9, 1826, and immigrated with his family to the United States in 1835. He came to Illinois in 1845, married Sophie Ann Brown in 1847, and moved to DeKalb in 1853, where he was a carpenter. He cultivated osage orange hedges whose thorns made them effective as cattle fencing.

== Invention of barbed wire ==
In late 1872, Henry Rose developed a wire fence with an attached wooden strip containing projecting wire points to dissuade encroaching livestock. He patented his fence in May 1873 and exhibited it at the DeKalb County Fair that summer. This prompted Haish and other DeKalb residents Isaac Ellwood and Joseph Glidden to work on improving the concept. Haish had patented three styles of barbed fencing by June 1874. When Haish's patent for an "S-barb" design was granted in August 1875, he launched a drawn out legal battle to stymie his rivals. It failed at the US Supreme Court in 1895.

== Philanthropy ==
Jacob and Sophia Haish had no children, so they chose to let their wealth benefit the community, including large gifts from his estate. Notable gifts established the original library at Northern Illinois University in 1895 and a permanent home for the DeKalb Public Library in 1928. In 1893, the city council of DeKalb, Illinois, decreed the establishment of a public library. The impetus for this ordinance was requests from the Ladies of the Library Association, a group that had conducted a reading room for several years. The library moved twice before the Haish gift came along; it was first located on the second floor of the city hall and then, in 1923, moved to the second floor of the DeKalb Daily Chronicle building on Lincoln Highway.

When Jacob Haish died at his home in DeKalb on February 19, 1926, his will also provided funds to establish a hospital in his name, but two modern hospitals had opened recently in DeKalb, the DeKalb Public Hospital and the Catholic St. Mary's Hospital, both in October 1922. Decades later in 1961, a new wing named after Haish was added to DeKalb Public Hospital, funded in part by his estate. That hospital closed in 1975, replaced by Kishwaukee Community Hospital. In 1979, the old hospital re-opened as Barb City Manor, a nonprofit retirement home. Kishwaukee Community Hospital in turn was replaced by a new building on their same site in 2007, funded in part by the final $450,000 of Haish's estate.

== See also ==
- George H. Gurler House
- Joseph F. Glidden House
