= Civil War Memorial =

Civil War Memorial may refer to:

- African American Civil War Memorial, Washington, D.C.
  - U Street (WMATA station), which contains "African-American Civil War Memorial/Cardozo" in its subtitle.
- Civil War Memorial (Adrian, Michigan)
- Civil War Memorial (Savannah, Georgia)
- Civil War Memorial (Sycamore, Illinois)
- Civil War Memorial (Webster, Massachusetts)
- Jewish Civil War Memorial (Cincinnati, Ohio)

== See also ==
- List of Union Civil War monuments and memorials
- List of Confederate monuments and memorials
