= Webster Municipal Buildings Historic District =

Historic district in Massachusetts, United States

- U.S. National Register of Historic Places
- U.S. Historic district
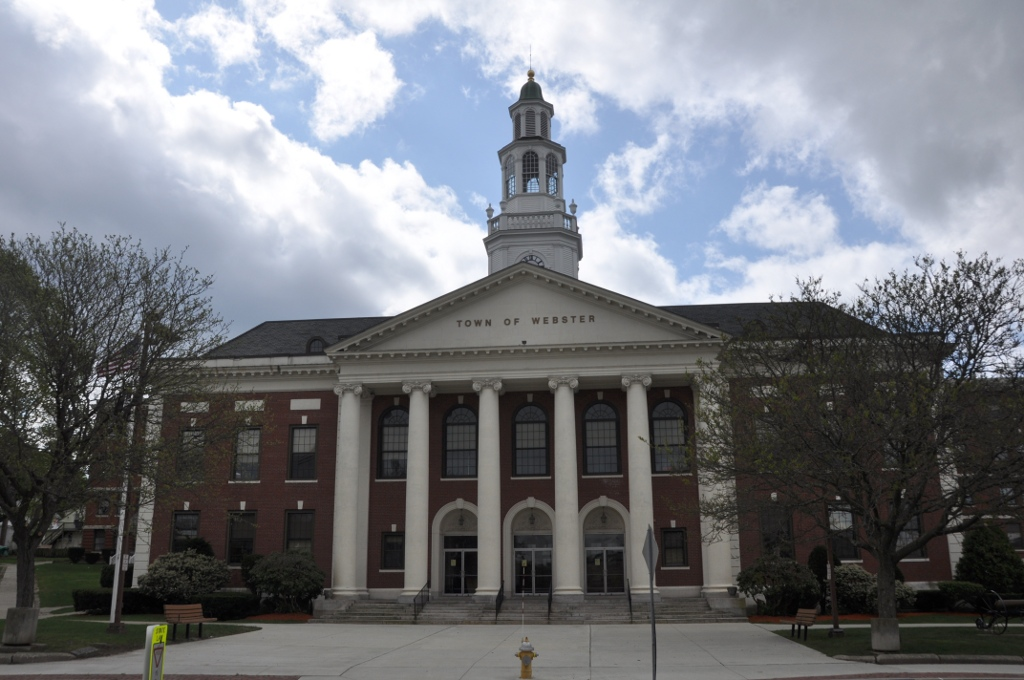
- Town Hall

- Location within Massachusetts Location within the United States
- Location: 350 Main, 29 Negus, & 2 Lake Sts., Webster, Massachusetts
- Coordinates: 42.04939°N 71.88037°W
- Area: 3.39 acres (1.37 ha)
- Built: 1903
- Architectural style: Classical Revival
- NRHP reference No.: 12000152
- Added to NRHP: March 27, 2012

The Webster Municipal Buildings Historic District encompasses a collection of Colonial Revival municipal buildings in the center of Webster, Massachusetts, along with a collection of military memorials on the grounds of the town hall. The historic district was listed on the National Register of Historic Places in 2012.

== Description ==
The district includes three buildings, the most prominent of which are the town hall and the Chester C. Corbin Public Library. The first building to be built, however, is the school building located on Negus Street behind town hall. Originally named Bartlett High School, the two-story Colonial Revival brick building was built 1903-5, and significantly renovated and extended in 1927–28, at the time of the town hall's construction. The building has features of both Colonial and Classical Revival, including a hip roof with gable dormers, a denticulated cornice with a wide frieze, and originally had a cupola on top. The school was renamed the Anthony J. Sitkowski School in 1979, and closed in 2005. It has since been converted to provide senior housing.

The town hall was built in 1927-28 to a design by Michael Dyer and Company, whose later work included several other notable municipal buildings in Massachusetts. The 2 1/2-story brick building is laid in Flemish bond, with paneled concrete corner quoins. Like the school, it has a hip roof, denticulated cornice, and wide frieze. The school's cupola was moved to top the town hall at this time, and the work done at this time included construction of an auditorium that joined the town hall and school together.

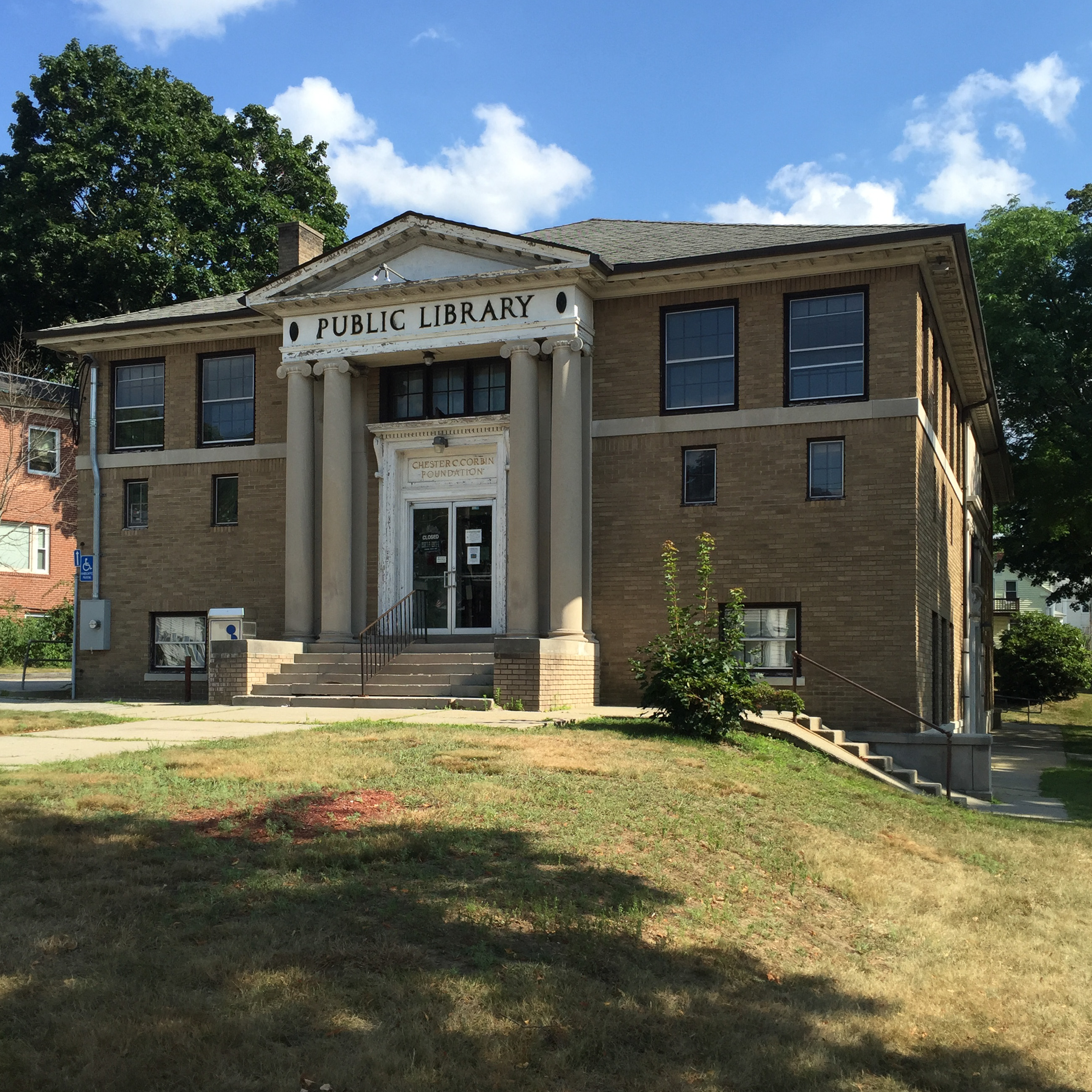
The library

The Chester C. Corbin Public Library building was built in 1920. It is predominantly Craftsman in its styling, although it includes Classical Revival details, particular in its entrances, which have columns and pilastered porticos framing them. The building has a low hip roof with extended eaves, in typical Craftsman style, as is its masonry-and-brick exterior. Construction of the library was made possible by a bequest from Mrs. Chester C. Corbin in 1918; it was designed by New York architect Edward Lippincott Tilton, who was already noted nationwide for is design work on other municipal libraries.

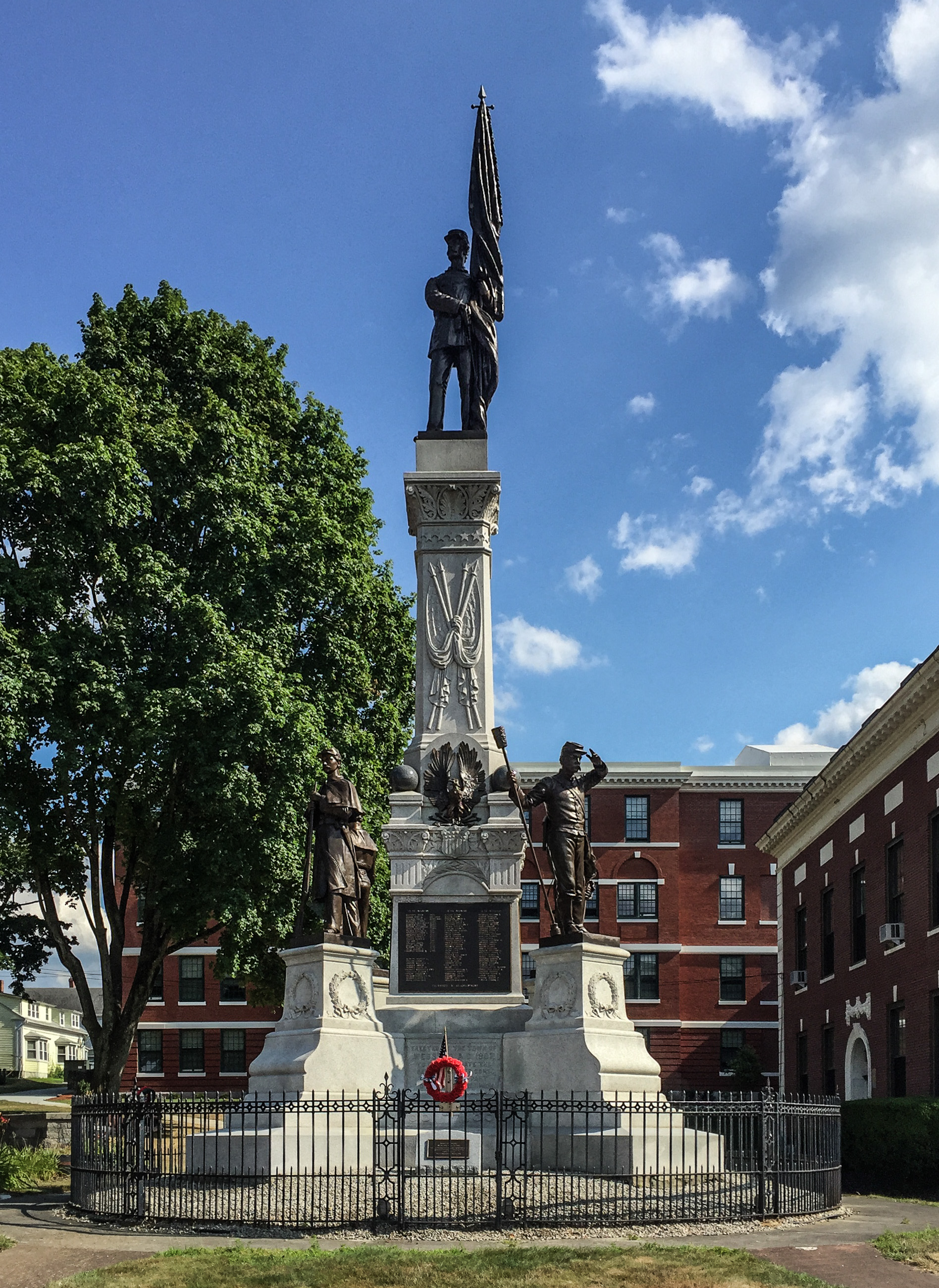
Webster Soldiers' Monument

In addition to the three buildings, the historic district includes several war memorials, most notably the 1907 Soldiers' Monument, dedicated to the town's Civil War soldiers. Near the memorial stand two Civil War-era howitzers. A second memorial, begun in 1953, commemorates the town's Korean and Vietnam War veterans.

== See also ==
- National Register of Historic Places listings in Worcester County, Massachusetts
