= Civil War Memorial (Sycamore, Illinois) =

- U.S. Historic district – Contributing property
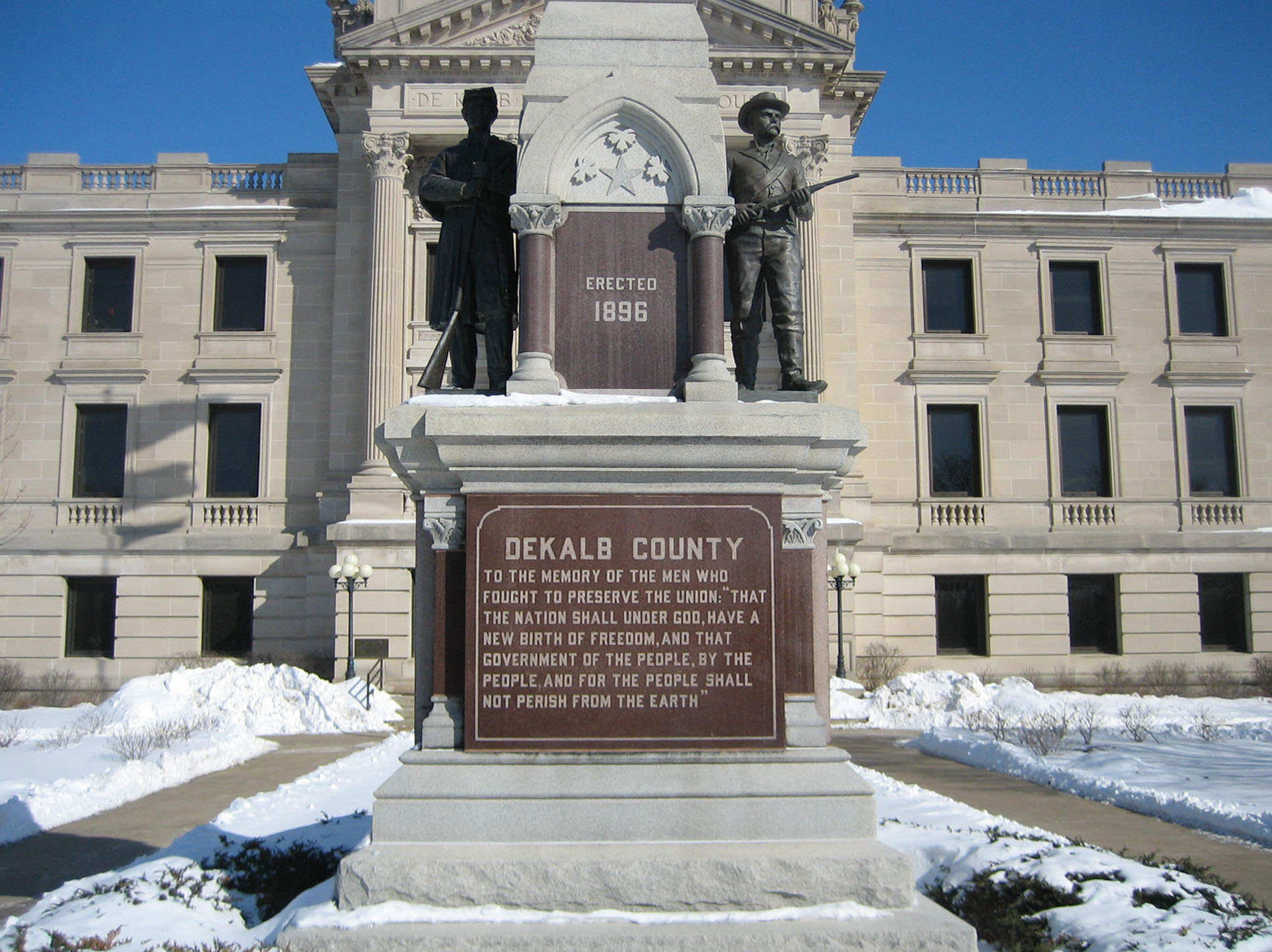
- Location: Sycamore, DeKalb County, Illinois, USA
- Coordinates: 41°59′2″N 88°41′39″W
- Built: 1896
- Part of: Sycamore Historic District (ID78003104)

The Civil War Memorial, in the DeKalb County county seat of Sycamore, Illinois, United States, is located in front of the DeKalb County Courthouse on a public square. The memorial was erected in 1896 and dedicated in 1897. The structure is a memorial to the thousands of DeKalb County residents who served in the American Civil War. It incorporates an obelisk which rises to 50 feet (15.2 m) in height. The base is adorned with copper sculpture, completed by an unknown sculptor. On the east facade of the memorial the word "Antietam", denoting the Battle of Antietam, is misspelled. This work of public art underwent its first restoration work in 2005–2006.

The memorial is included among the 187 buildings and structures considered contributing properties to the Sycamore Historic District. The historic district was added to the U.S. National Register of Historic Places in 1978. The structure also has artistic significance as it is listed by the Smithsonian American Art Museum in their research database. It is one of the few sculptures in DeKalb County found within that database. The Civil War Memorial is owned by DeKalb County.

== History ==
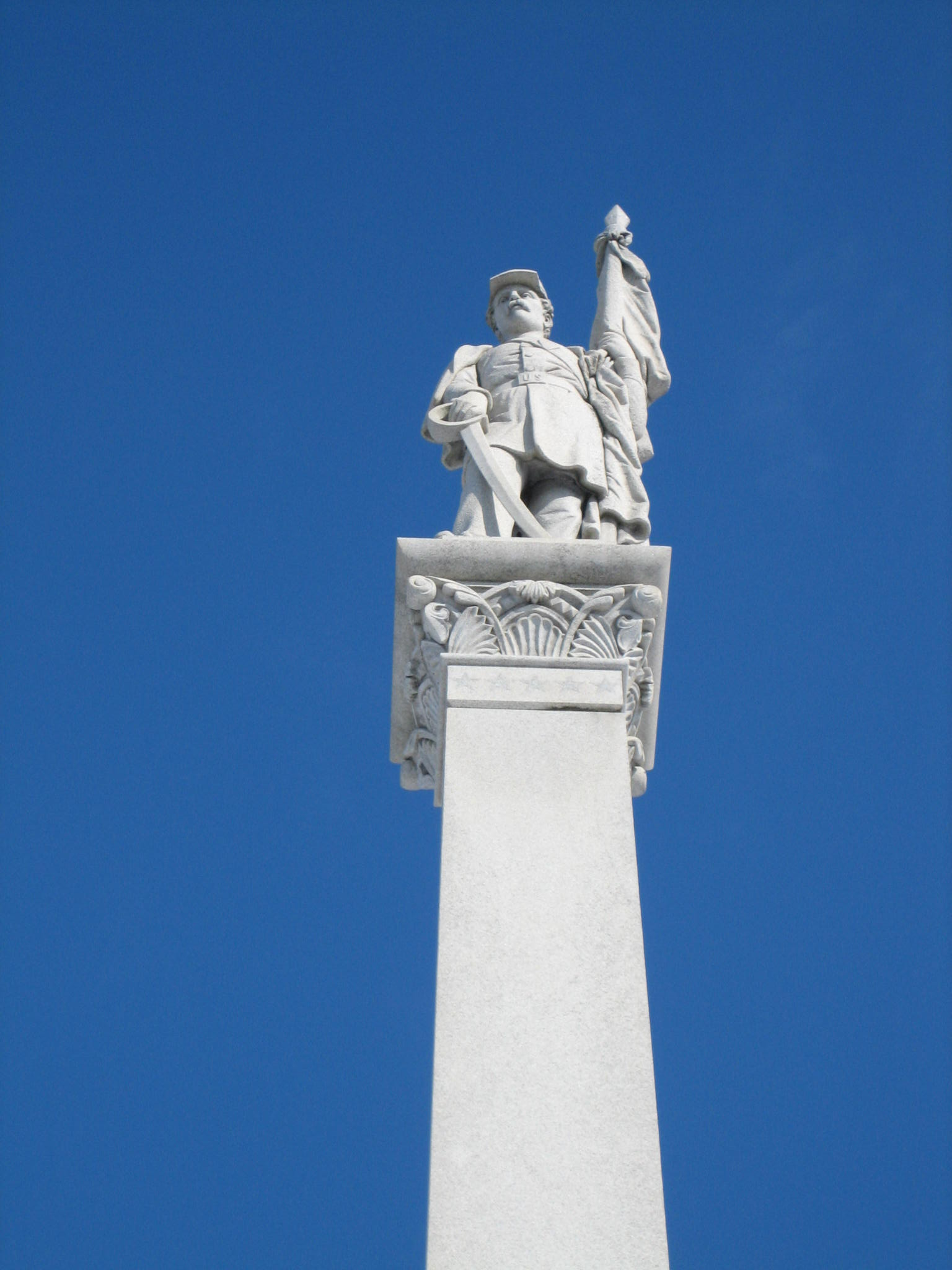
The soldier figure atop the monument's obelisk.

The DeKalb County Civil War Memorial and the sculpture that adorns it was created by an unknown sculptor and installed in front of the DeKalb County Courthouse in 1896. The county-owned memorial stands on the public square in Sycamore, the county seat and is 50 feet (15.2 m) tall. The structure was dedicated on June 24, 1897 as a memorial to the 2,388 people from DeKalb County who served in the military during the American Civil War.

In July 2005 the statues adorning the monument underwent a restoration. DeKalb County appropriated US$15,000 for the project which, among other tasks, repaired a split seam in one of the soldier statues and a crack in the other sculpture's base. The project took approximately six months; the statues were removed for the duration of the restoration work and reinstalled in March 2006. During the restoration it was revealed that the statues, thought to be bronze, were actually copper. The work, the first in the 110-year history of the memorial, was completed at a cost of $16,500. Three months after the work was completed one of the statues was removed for a second time because the metal began to oxidize.

== Design ==
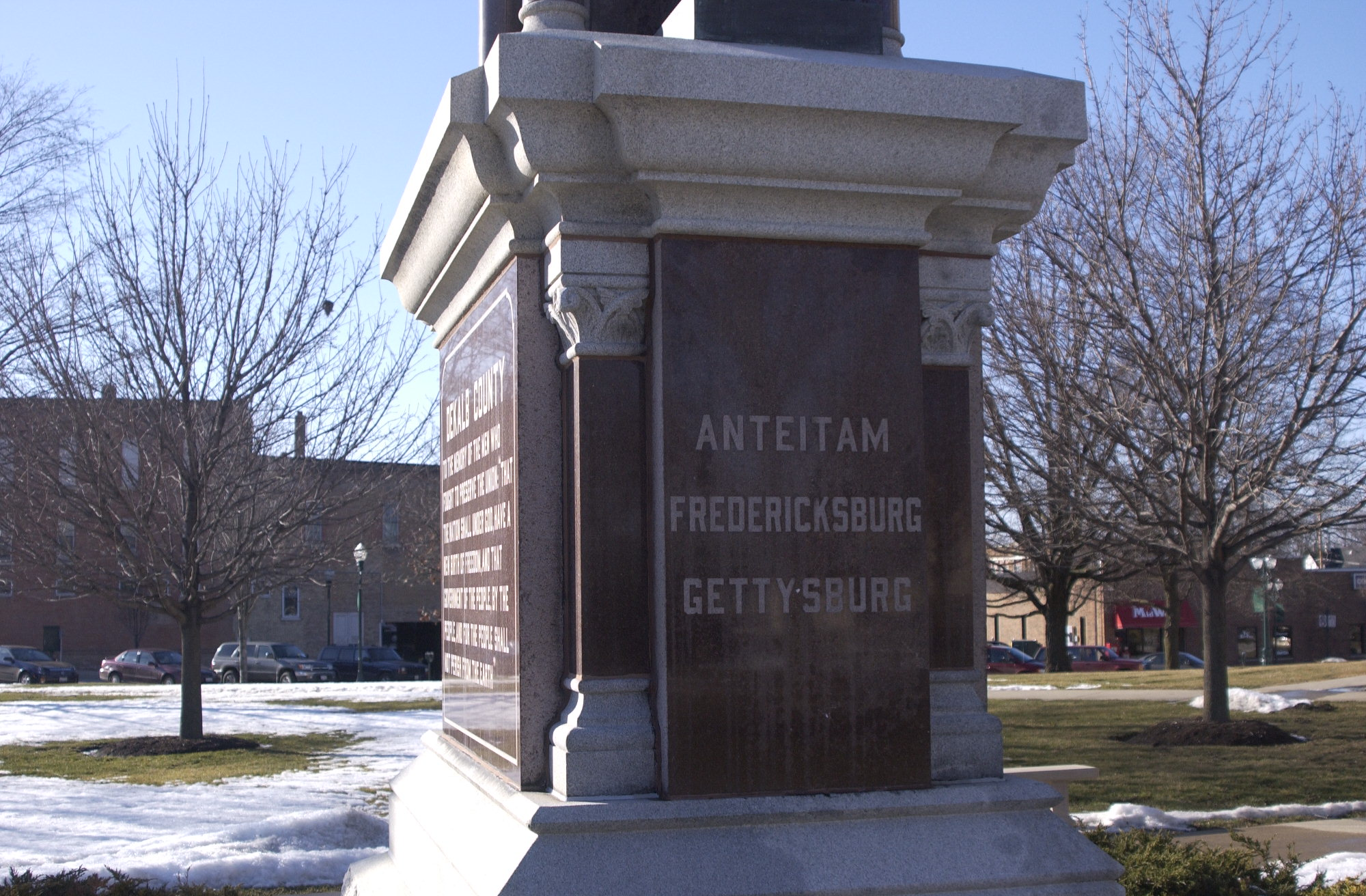
"Antietam" is misspelled on the east side of the memorial.

The 50-foot (15.2-m) tall memorial has base dimensions of 10 feet (3 m) by 6 feet (1.8 m). The monument is constructed from a combination of marble, masonry, and the metal used for the sculpted copper and masonry soldiers. The structure also incorporated wood into its design. The rifles the figures on the base hold and the bases that they stand on are made of wood. The front facade is adorned with a marble plate engraved with an excerpt from U.S. President Abraham Lincoln's Gettysburg Address. Each of the other facades, also marble faced, are emblazoned with the names of major battles and campaigns of the war. The word "Antietam," representing the Battle of Antietam, is misspelled on the east, marble facade of the memorial as "Anteitam."

The two copper statues, each standing 6 feet (1.8 m) tall, flank the obelisk which rises to a masonry soldier statue, instead of the typical apex of an obelisk. The figure atop the granite obelisk is a mustached American Civil War soldier dressed in a long coat, a cape, and a cap. In the figure's right hand he holds the handle of his sword and the sword's tip rests in front of his right foot. In the soldier's left hand is a flag. Below the apex of the obelisk, on the memorial's base, are two additional sculpted figures, a Union infantry soldier and a Union cavalry soldier. The Union infantryman is dressed in a cap, long coat, and a cape, much like the figure atop the obelisk. The Union cavalryman, standing on the east side of the base, is dressed in a brimmed hat and short jacket.

== Significance ==
The 1974 Illinois Historic Sites Survey Inventory found the DeKalb County Civil War Memorial significant in the areas of military and sculpture. At the time of the 1974 survey, the memorial was considered in "excellent" and "not altered" condition. It is also one of the few sculptures in DeKalb County that is listed in the Smithsonian American Art Museum's Smithsonian Institution Research Information System (SIRIS). The Civil War Memorial is listed as a contributing property to the Sycamore Historic District. The historic district joined the U.S. National Register of Historic Places on May 2, 1978. As a part of the Sycamore Historic District, the National Register classifies the DeKalb County Civil War Memorial as an "object."

== See also ==
- DeKalb County Courthouse
