= Civil War Memorial (Webster, Massachusetts) =

Webster Civil War Memorial
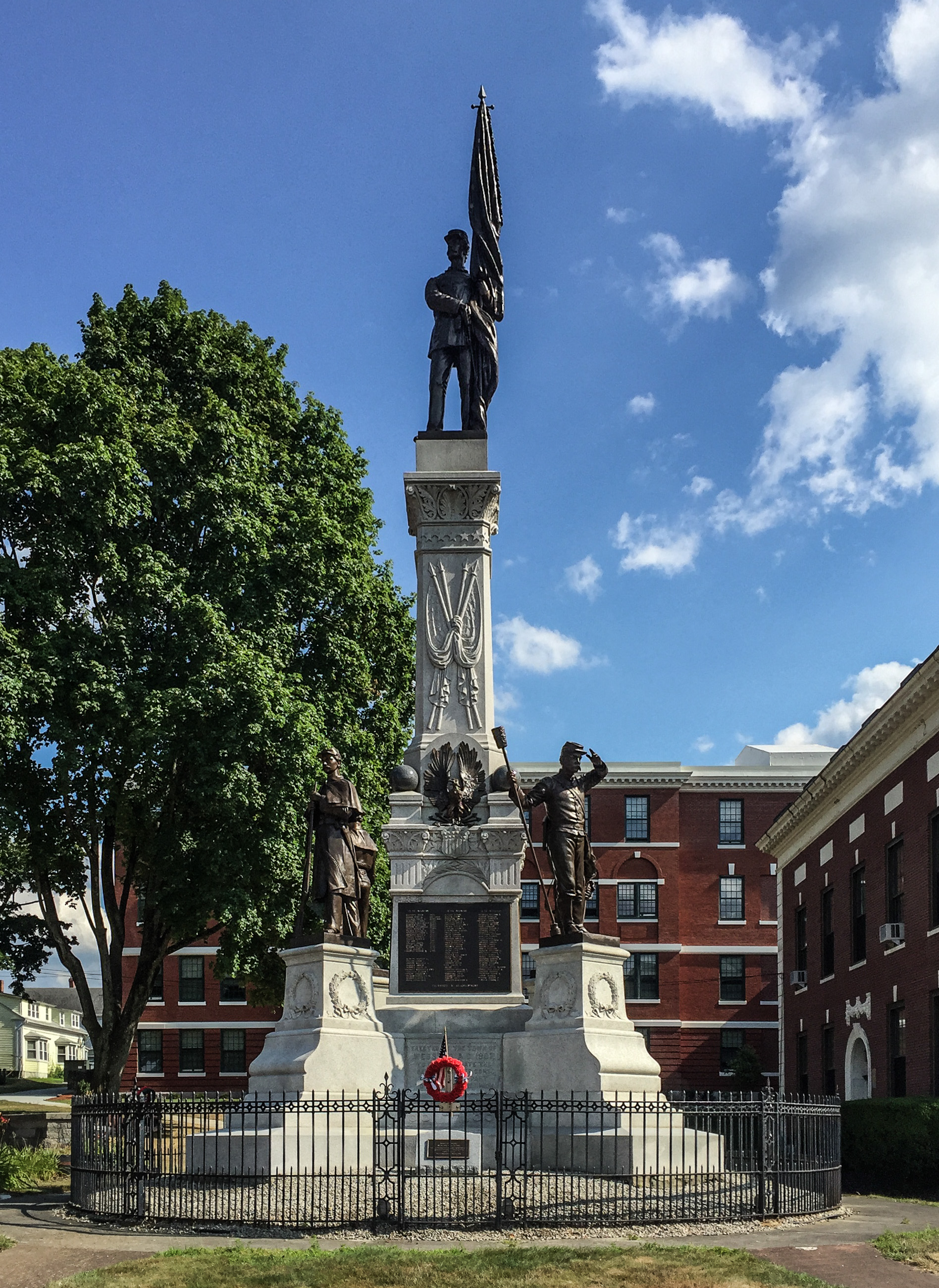
- Interactive map of Webster Civil War Memorial
- Location: Webster, Massachusetts
- Coordinates: 42.04981°N 71.88021°W
- Inauguration date: Unveiled in 1907
- Dedicated to: American Civil War

A Civil War Memorial stands in downtown Webster, Massachusetts, in front of the town hall as one part of a series of war monuments called Honor Court. This memorial was dedicated in 1907 and consists of a central tower with a bronze statue of a soldier on top. Four other bronze statues of soldiers stand at each of the four corners: an infantryman, artilleryman, cavalryman, and sailor.

Each bronze soldier statue was created in 125% scale from real life.

On October 11, 1906, the contract for this memorial was awarded to J.W. White & Sons of Quincy.

== Gallery ==
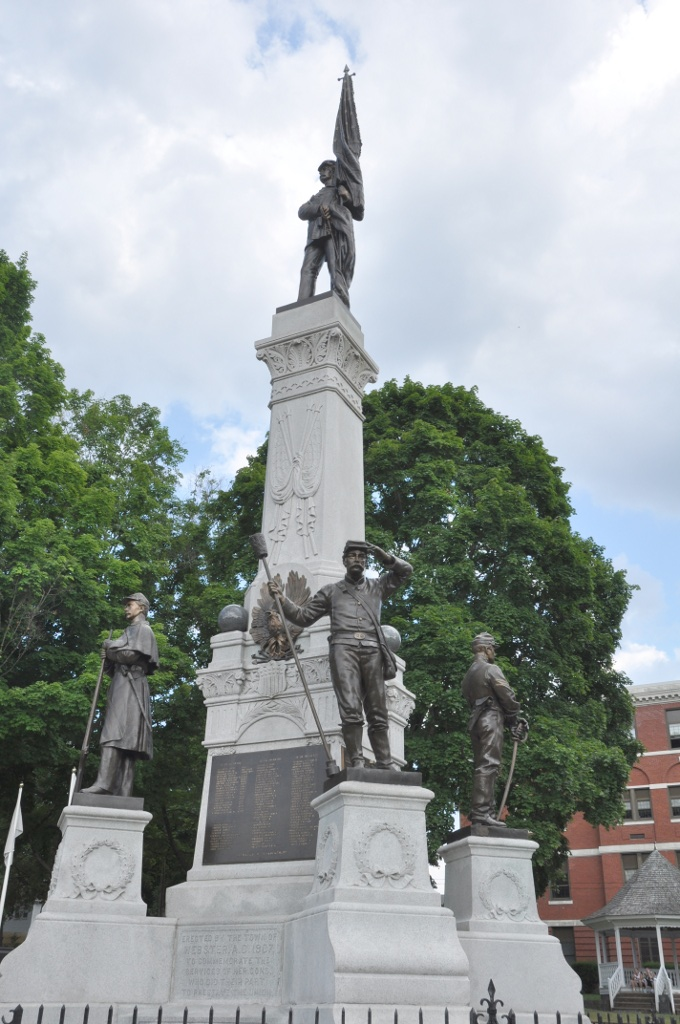

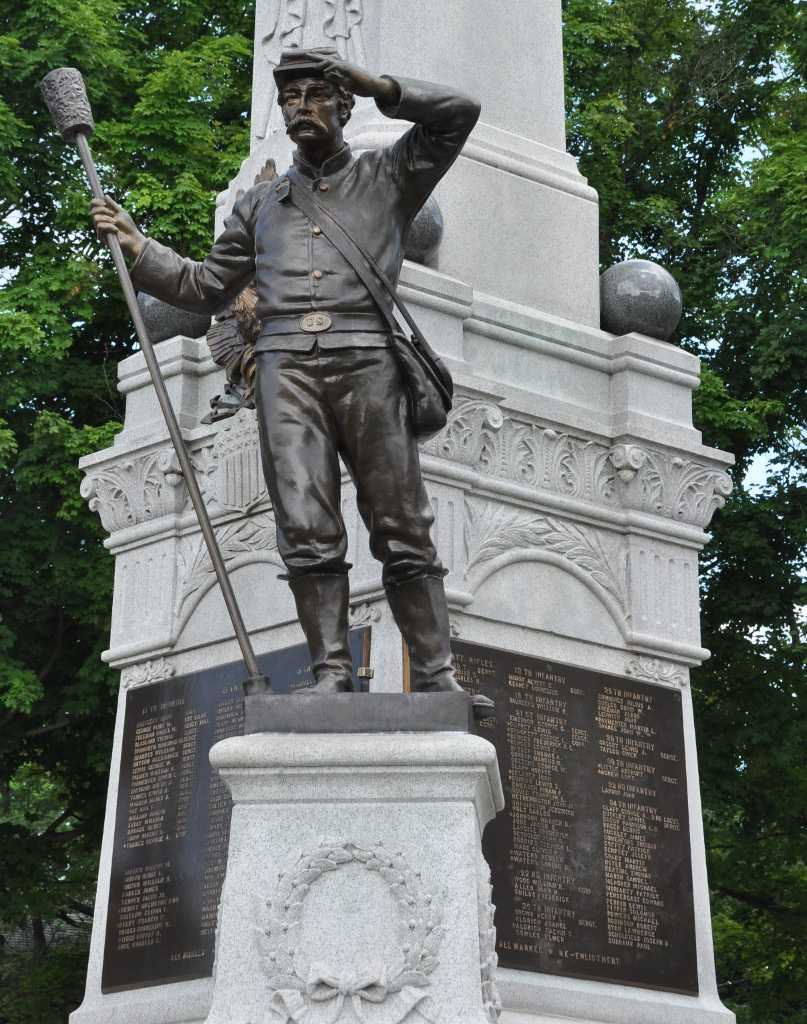
Detail of an artilleryman

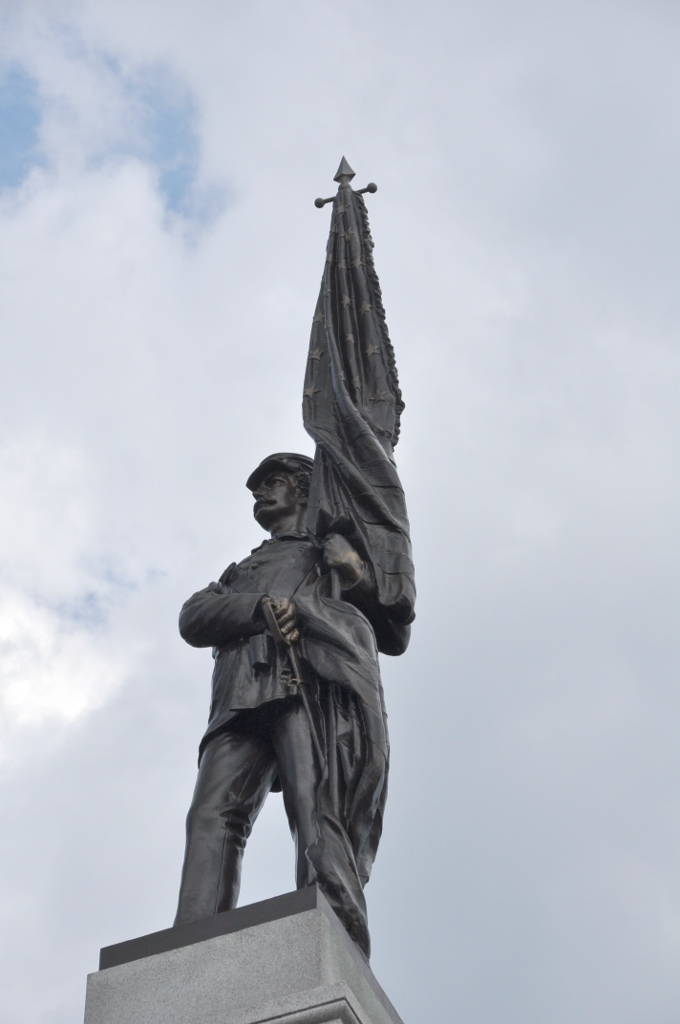
Detail of the standard bearer at the top
